= Berliner Handels-Gesellschaft =

Former German bank

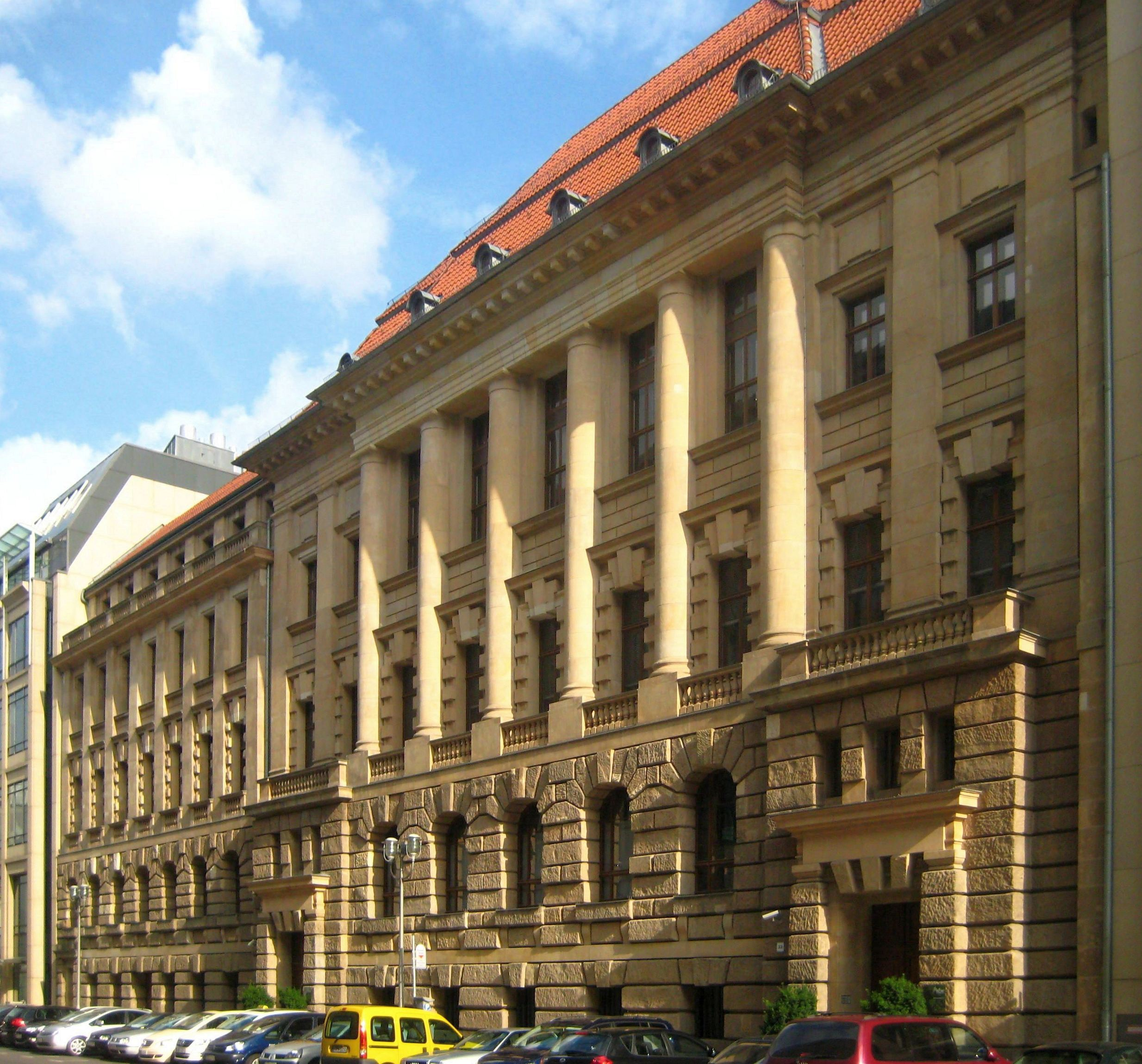
Former Berliner Handels-Gesellschaft head office complex, façade on Behrensstrasse

The Berliner Handels-Gesellschaft (BHG, lit. 'Trade Company of Berlin') was a significant German joint-stock bank, founded in 1856 in Berlin. It relocated to Frankfurt following World War II.

On 1 September 1970 (with retroactive effect at 1 January 1970), BHG merged with Frankfurter Bank to form Berliner Handels-Gesellschaft - Frankfurter Bank, referred to as BHF Bank from 1975 to 2017 and since then as ODDO BHF.

== Overview ==
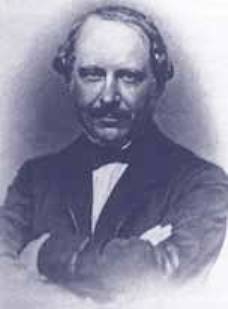
Gustav Mevissen (1815-1899) organized the consortium that established the BHG

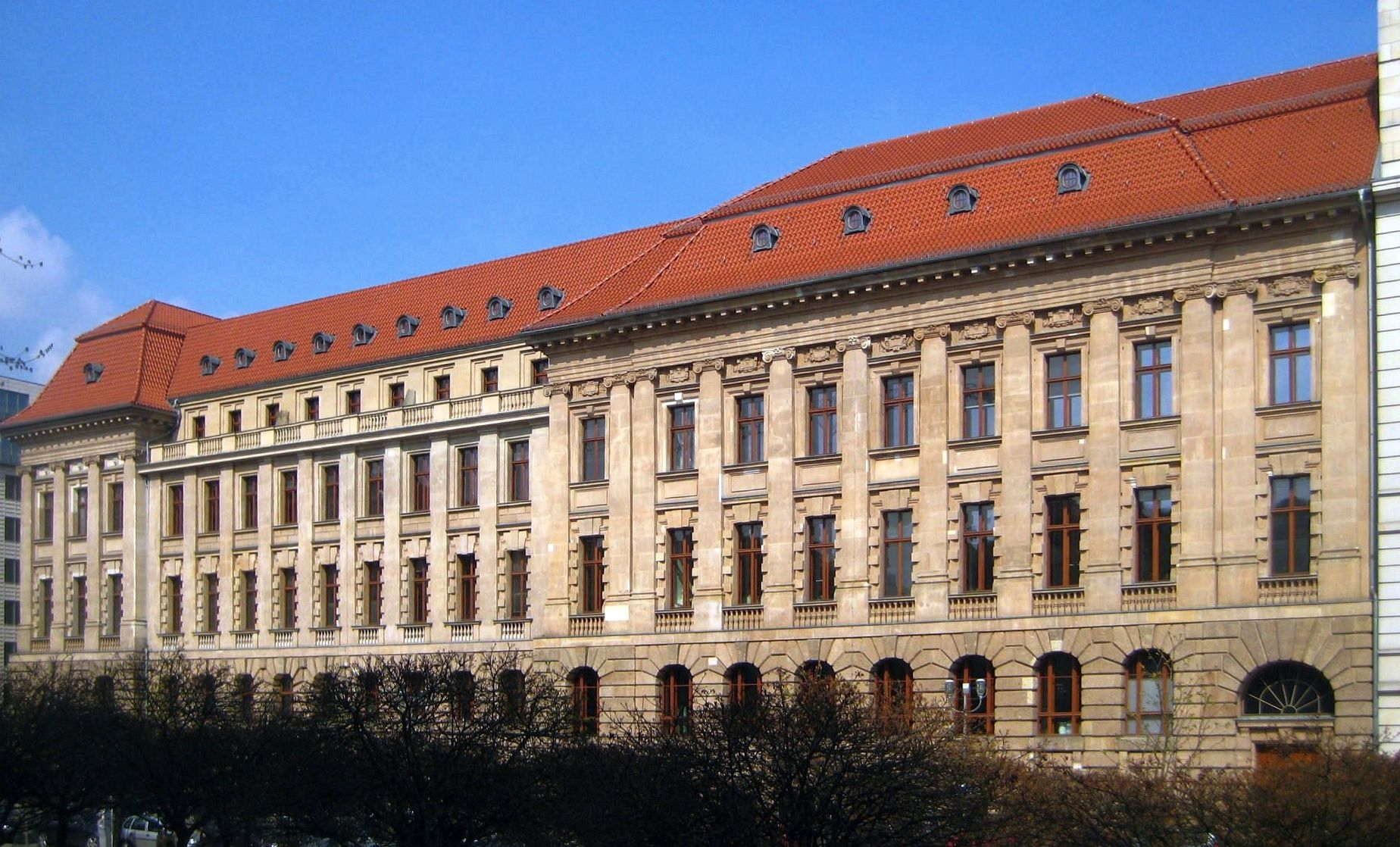
Former Berliner Handels-Gesellschaft head office complex, Französische Strasse 42-44

The foundation of the BHG in 1856 was inspired by the experience of the Crédit Mobilier in France (est. 1852) and its German emulator the Bank für Handel und Industrie in Darmstadt, or Darmstädter Bank (est. 1853). Initially organized by Darmstädter Bank veteran Gustav Mevissen, its founding sponsors included S. Bleichröder, Breest & Gelpcke, Bankhaus F. Mart. Magnus, Mendelssohn & Co., and Robert Warschauer senior. It was one of the first five large commercial banks in Germany, following the A. Schaaffhausen'scher Bankverein in Cologne (1848), the Disconto-Gesellschaft in Berlin (1851-1856), the Darmstädter Bank (1853), and the Mitteldeutsche Creditbank in Meiningen (1856). Like the Disconto-Gesellschaft, and unlike Schaaffhausen and the Darmstädter Bank, the BHG was formed as a limited stock company (German: Kommanditgesellschaft auf Aktien) rather than a joint-stock company (Aktiengesellschaft) because of the restrictive stance of the Prussian authorities about the latter. The BHG was involved early on in securities issuances, particularly by German railway companies.

In 1872, the BHG participated in the creation of the Dresdner Bank, as part of a consortium together with Allgemeine Deutsche Credit-Anstalt (Leipzig), Deutsche Vereinsbank (Frankfurt), Deutsche Effecten- und Wechselbank (Frankfurt) and Anglo-Deutsche Bank (Hamburg). That same year it was involved in the creation of Basler Bankverein in Basel.

In 1883, Carl Fürstenberg took over the bank's leadership and developed it successfully. Under Fürstenberg's leadership, the bank became increasingly associated with Emil Rathenau and his industrial concern AEG. In 1894, it partnered with other German banks to create the Banca Commerciale Italiana in Milan, and in 1898, the Banque Internationale de Bruxelles. After World War I, Emil's son Walther Rathenau became the BHG's board chairman.

By 1930, the BHG was Germany's sixth-largest joint-stock bank by total deposits with 412 million Reichsmarks, behind Deutsche Bank & Disconto-Gesellschaft (4.8 billion), Danat-Bank (2.4 billion), Dresdner Bank (2.3 billion), Commerz- und Privatbank (1.5 billion), and Reichs-Kredit-Gesellschaft (619 million). The BHG weathered the European banking crisis of 1931 comparatively unscathed, and was alone among the larger private-sector banks not to receive any capital injection from the government. It was severely affected, however, by the takeover of the Nazi Party and by the death of Carl Fürstenberg on 9 February 1933.

After World War II, the bank's Berlin seat found itself in the Soviet occupation zone, but the bank was able to maintain legal continuity through a Thuringian office it had created in 1943, which was relocated to Erlangen in 1945 and eventually to Frankfurt in 1948, then allowed by special legislation in 1954 to assume the full BHG legacy. It was hosted by the Frankfurter Bank for two years until moving to its own location in 1950.

== Berlin head office complex ==
The BHG's head office in Berlin was mostly built in 1897–1900 on a design by architect Alfred Messel, with two main façades respectively on Französische Strasse (south) and Behrensstrasse (north). In 1909–1911, this was complemented by a westward extension on Charlottenstrasse, designed by Messel's former associate Heinrich Schweitzer. After 1945, the BHG building became part of the head office complex of the Staatsbank der DDR, together with its neighbor on the eastern side, the former head office of Dresdner Bank. Following German reunification, the former BHG building was repurposed to become the Berlin office of KfW, on a design by Frankfurt-based ABB Architects. The renovated complex was inaugurated in June 2001 in the presence of German Chancellor Gerhard Schröder.

== See also ==
- Reichs-Kredit-Gesellschaft
- List of banks in Germany
