= Frankfurter Bank =

Former German bank

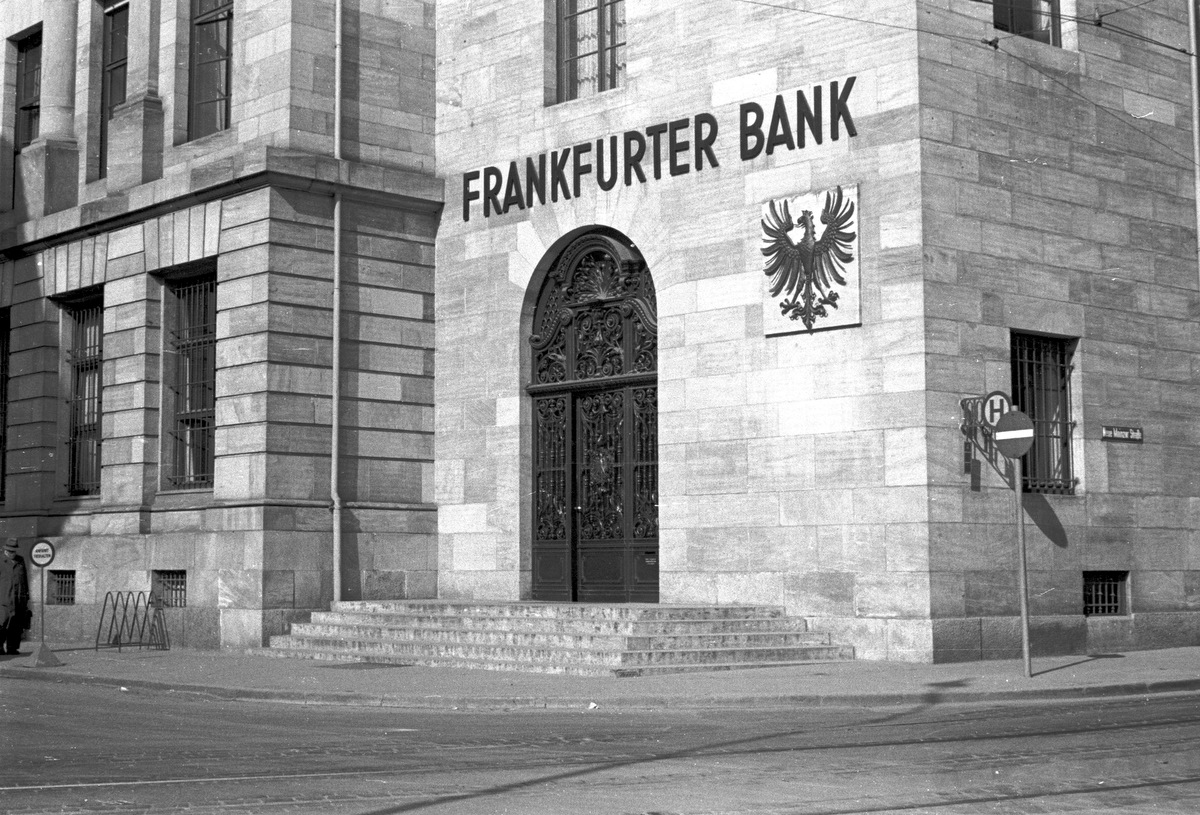
- Entrance of the Frankfurter Bank in the 1950s on Neue Mainzer Strasse 69
- Company type: Private company
- Industry: Financial services
- Founded: 1854
- Defunct: January 1, 1970
- Fate: Merged
- Successor: BHF Bank and then ODDO BHF
- Headquarters: Frankfurt, Germany
- Area served: Frankfurt area
- Products: Bank note issuing, loans

The Frankfurter Bank was a German bank founded in 1854 in Frankfurt, which issued its own banknotes until 1901. On 1 January 1970, it merged with the Berliner Handels-Gesellschaft to form Berliner Handels- und Frankfurter Bank, generally referred to as BHF Bank until 2017 and since then as ODDO BHF.

== History ==
The Frankfurter Bank was founded in 1854 to serve as a bank of issue for the then-autonomous Free City of Frankfurt, realizing a project that had long been under discussion but was accelerated by the nearby establishment of the Darmstädter Bank the previous year.

The bank was sponsored by local banking houses including M. A. Rothschild & Söhne, Bethmann Bank, and Grunelius & Co., and authorized by the Frankfurt municipal council; the initial share subscription was oversubscribed 16 times, above all expectations. Its first general manager was Wilhelm Isaac Gillé. The bank issued banknotes denominated in Guilders (German: Gulde), by then the monetary standard in the South German area of which Frankfurt was part. Together with the Bank of Bremen, it was viewed as more independent than most other banks of issue in Germany, which were generally under direct government control even when they were not government-owned.

The Frankfurter Bank's notes did not have legal tender status but enjoyed solid reputation and were accepted beyond the boundaries of the city-state, even after the latter came to an end in 1866. In 1885, the sentence "The Frankfurter Bank in Frankfurt-am-Main has always had a particularly respected position in the commercial world" (German: "Eine besonders geachtete Stellung nahm in der kaufmännischen Welt von jeher die Frankfurter Bank in Frankfurt a. M. ein") was included in the Meyers Konversations-Lexikon phrasebook. The Frankfurter Bank was allowed to keep issuing banknotes until 1901, even though that activity had become marginal following the establishment of the Reichsbank in 1875; its banknotes were finally withdrawn on 31 December 1901.

The Frankfurter Bank was originally located at Münzgasse 2 in Frankfurt's historic city center. In the late 19th century, it erected a palatial head office at Neue Mainzerstrasse 69, designed by architect Hermann Ritter. That building was destroyed during World War II, then rebuilt in the 1950s on a streamlined monumental design. It was eventually demolished to make way for the Bürohaus an der Alten Oper skyscraper, erected in the early 1980s.

In 1925, the State Bank of Prussia took a 10 percent equity stake in the Frankfurter Bank. In 1946, on the joint initiative of surviving board member Hans Heinrich Hauck and former Reichs-Kredit-Gesellschaft (RKG) board member Hermann Jannsen, the bank was reorganized as a credit institution, and in the following years the Frankfurter Bank's management increasingly included former executives of the defunct RKG. In 1962, the bank opened its first branch outside of Frankfurt. It eventually merged with Berliner Handels-Gesellschaft, which after 1945 had also relocated to Frankfurt.

== See also ==
- Hamburger Bank
- Bank of Bremen
- Bank of Baden
- List of banks in Germany
