= Landesbank der Rheinprovinz =

Former public bank in Germany

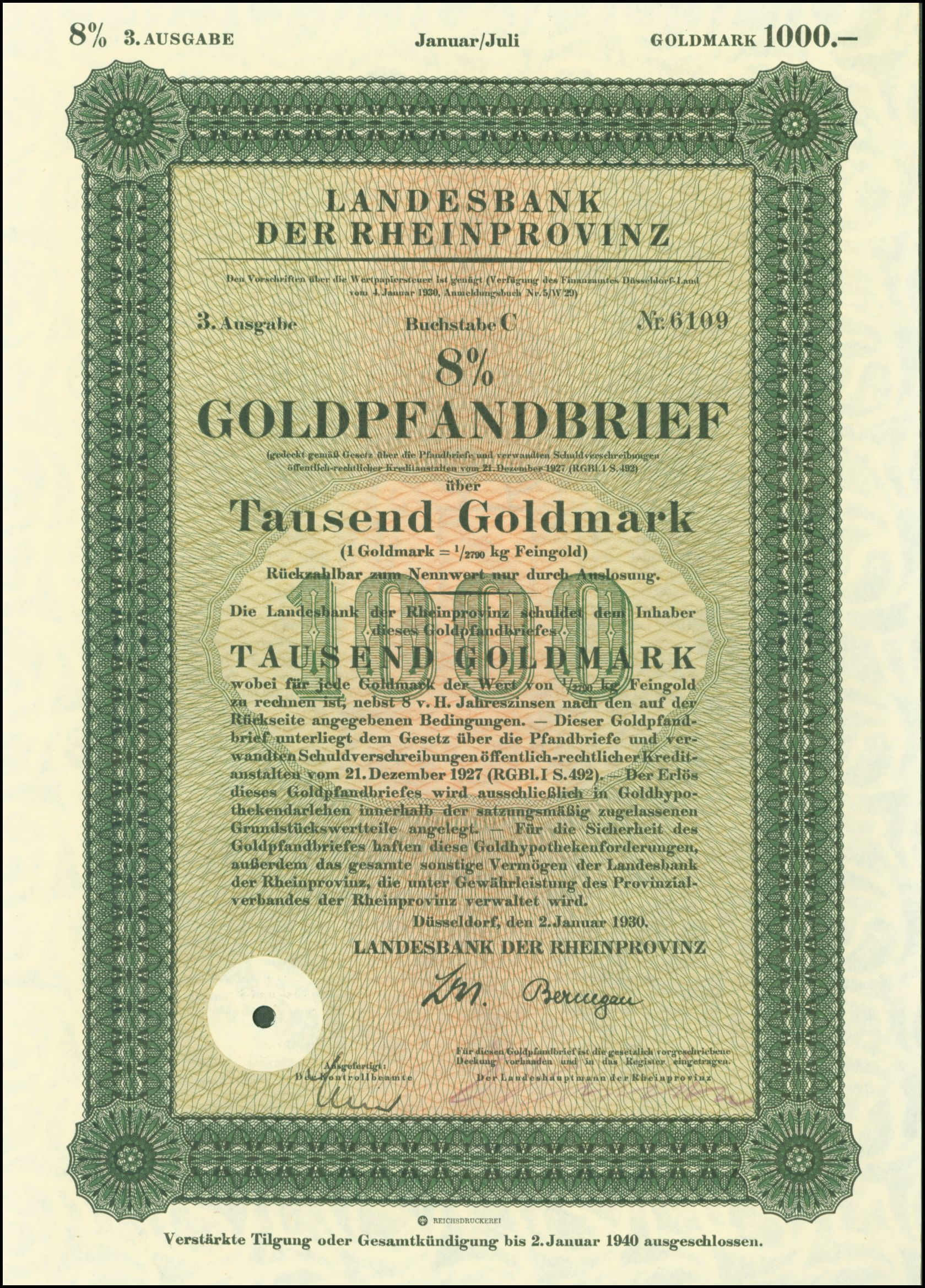
Covered bond of the Landesbank der Rheinprovinz, January 1930

The Landesbank der Rheinprovinz or Rheinische Landesbank was a German provincial public bank or Landesbank, whose origins go back to the Rheinische Provinzial-Hülfskasse (lit. 'Assistance Fund of the Rhine Province') established 1854 in the Rhine Province of Prussia. Following uncontrolled expansion in the 1920s, it collapsed in 1931, shortly after Austria's Creditanstalt and before Danatbank, thus contributing materially to the European banking crisis of 1931.

The Landesbank der Rheinprovinz was a direct predecessor entity of Westdeutsche Landesbank (WestLB), which had its head office in Düsseldorf on the same grounds where the Rheinische Landesbank had been established. WestLB in turn collapsed in 2007–2008 after uncontrolled balance sheet expansion, in an echo of the previous episode of 1931.

== Rheinische Provinzial-Hülfskasse ==
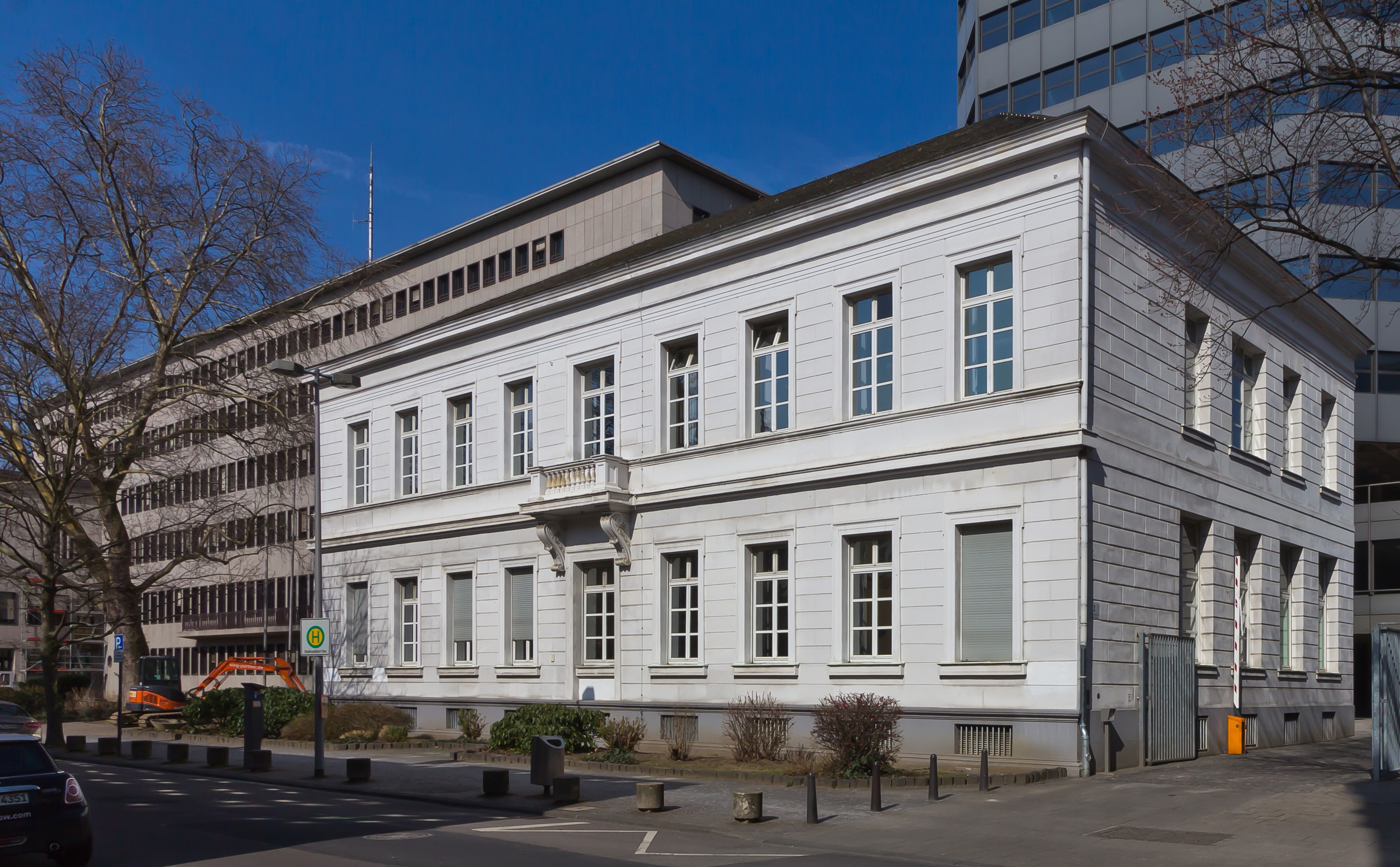
Altes Regierungsgebäude in Cologne's Zeughausstraße, original seat of the Rheinische Provinzial-Hülfskasse

The Rheinische Provinzial-Hülfskasse was established in Cologne on 7 February 1854 with capital of 400,000 thalers, on a statutory basis of 24 November 1853. Its mandate was not about making profits but "supporting institutions, municipal buildings or commercial companies with loans, paying off municipal debts, and promoting the savings bank system through centralized management of savings."

The Provincial Parliament of the Rhine Province took charge of oversight of the Rheinische Provinzial-Hülfskasse in September 1871. As a consequence, on 10 July 1877 the fund's head office was relocated from Cologne to the parliament's seat in Düsseldorf, against the will of the fund's directors who preferred Cologne as a more vibrant financial center at the time.

== Landesbank der Rheinprovinz ==
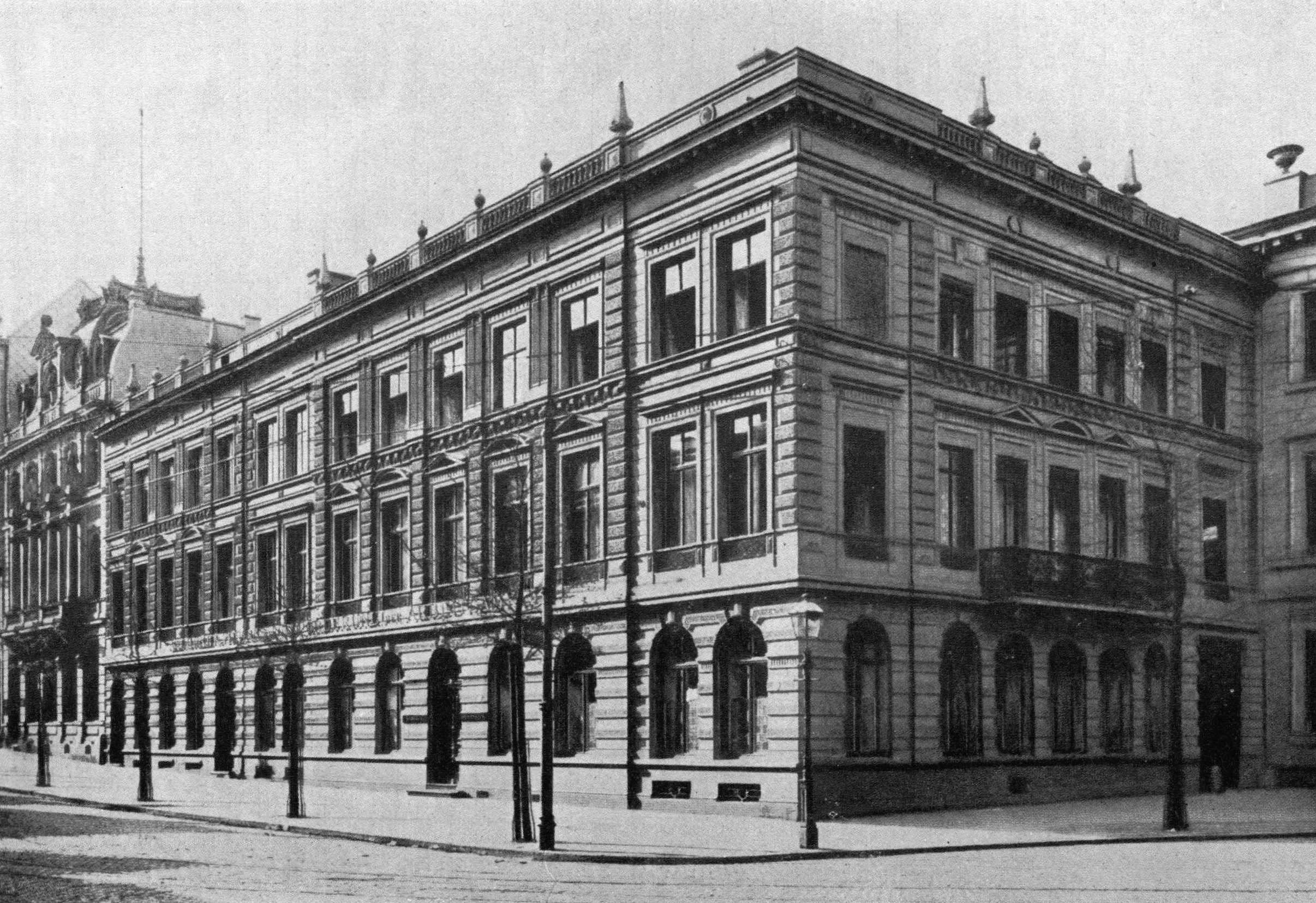
Branch building of the Landesbank in Aachen, photographed before 1925

In February 1888, the Rheinische Provinzial-Hülfskasse was renamed the Landesbank der Rheinprovinz. On 1 November 1919, the Landesbank opened a branch in Cologne.

In the 1920s, the Landesbank, led by Hubert Bel and August Bernegau, expanded dramatically by aggressively lending to municipalities with few internal controls and insufficient capital. As a consequence, it collapse in mid-1931 when the financial environment became unfavorable. German interior ministry official Simon Abramowitz identified the Landesbank's alarming financial position during an on-site inspection in mid-June 1931, but that was too late to prevent disaster. The Landesbank der Rheinprovinz suspended payments on 11 July 1931.

== Aftermath ==
The function of payments clearing house (German: Girozentrale) was taken over in August 1931 by Deutsche Girozentrale, a national institution established in 1918, through its Cologne branch which from October 1931 was led by Fritz Butschkau. That branch took over staff of the former Landesbank and received liquidity support of 100 million Reichsmarks from the Reichsbank, which it largely passed on to savings banks. In April 1935, the business was in turn transferred to the newly formed Rheinische Girozentrale und Provinzialbank, of which Butschkau would become chairman in 1945. In 1969, Rheinische Girozentrale und Provinzialbank merged with Landesbank für Westfalen (Girozentrale) to form Westdeutsche Landesbank.

== See also ==
- Landesbank
- German public banking sector
- List of banks in Germany
