= European banking crisis of 1931 =

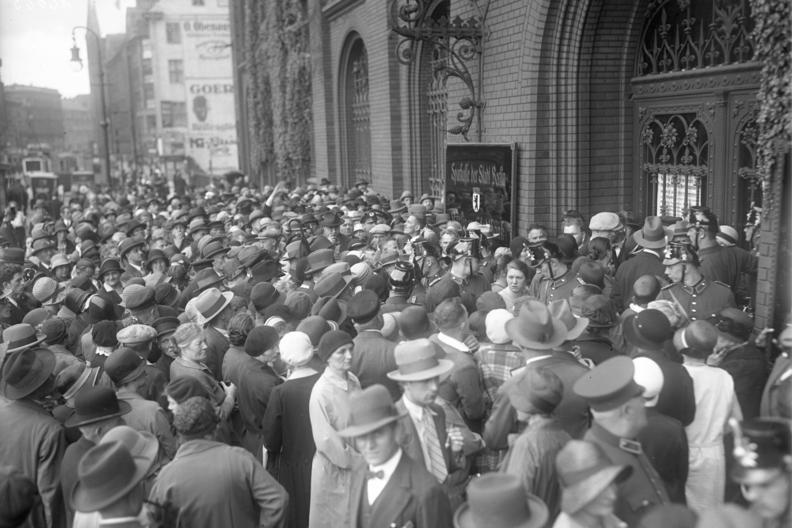
Bank run at the Sparkasse on Mühlendamm, Berlin, 13 July 1931

The European banking crisis of 1931 was a major episode of financial instability that peaked with the collapse of several major banks in Austria and Germany, including Creditanstalt on 11 May 1931, Landesbank der Rheinprovinz on 11 July 1931, and Danat-Bank on 13 July 1931. It triggered Germany's exit from the gold standard on 15 July 1931, followed by the UK on 19 September 1931, and extensive losses in the U.S. financial system that contributed to the Great Depression.

The causes of the crisis included a complex mix of financial, fiscal, macroeconomic, political, and international imbalances that have sparked a lively debate in historiography.

== Background ==
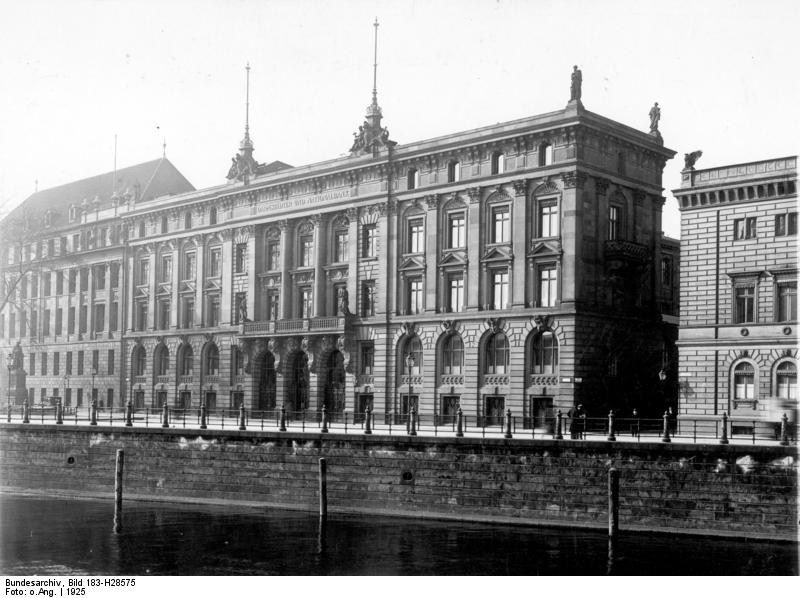
Head office of Danat-Bank at Schinkelplatz, Berlin, in 1925

Germany's banking sector shrank dramatically from 1913 to 1924. However, it expanded rapidly again in the late 1920s, with aggregate bank assets growing fivefold between 1924 and 1930. The banks were generally undercapitalized and overstretched following rapid balance sheet expansion in the late 1920s, with a preponderance of short-term debt, much of it foreign. Germany was the world's largest capital importer between 1924 and 1929, with U.S. banks lending massively to German counterparts and U.S. investors buying German bonds in large volumes. By mid-1928, 42 percent of deposits at joint-stock banks were foreign, and the share was 18 percent of all deposits in the German banking sector in 1929. This unusual feature of the German financial system was a direct legacy of the hyperinflation of 1921–1923, which durably impaired the role of capital markets and made the country abnormally dependent on short-term foreign lending. Many German companies routinely parked their money in foreign subsidiaries that, in turn, lent to their German parent. Similar patterns could be observed in other Central European countries that had suffered from hyperinflation, particularly Austria, Hungary, and Poland, to a lesser extent Romania, and much less so Czechoslovakia.

The large Berlin-based branch banks also made numerous acquisitions of smaller competitors. This trend contributed to the rapid increase of their market share from 12.6 to 23.3 percent of total assets between 1913 and 1928, and culminated in 1929 with two large-scale transactions, Commerzbank's acquisition of Mitteldeutsche Creditbank and Deutsche Bank's acquisition of Disconto-Gesellschaft. The long-standing practice of self-regulation in the German banking sector, except for local savings banks (German: Sparkassen), implied that this increase in leverage was not kept in check by public supervision. Even at the time, self-regulation was not obviously effective to keep risks in check: for example, Deutsche Bank was impacted by a series of scandals related to poor credit risk controls in the mid-1920s.

By the late 1920s, public banks (Staatsbanken, Landesbanken, Girozentralen, Kommunalbanken, and Sparkassen) represented more than one-third of the German banking sector measured by total assets; large Berlin-based universal banks (German: Grossbanken), another 20 percent; cooperative banks, about 10 percent; private banks, about 6 percent; the rest being mainly provincial (e.g. Bayerische Vereinsbank and Hypo-Bank in Bavaria, Barmer Bankverein in the Ruhr, Allgemeine Deutsche Credit-Anstalt in Saxony) and other joint-stock banks. Of the Grossbanken, the four largest (Deutsche Bank, Danat-Bank, Dresdner Bank, and Commerzbank) maintained extensive branch networks. In contrast, others (e.g., Berliner Handels-Gesellschaft and Reichs-Kredit-Gesellschaft) had no branch network and were comparatively more active lending to other banks than to industry. There was no simple correlation between bank type and risk profiles; for example, the Landesbank der Rheinprovinz had expanded its lending to municipalities without proper risk management, whereas its peer, the Mitteldeutsche Landesbank, had behaved more prudently.

Harbingers of crisis started to accumulate at the end of the decade. German stock prices started declining with the "Black Friday" of 13 May 1927, and GDP growth slowed substantially in 1928 and turned negative in 1929. Industrial production started to decline from mid-1929. A cyclical credit crunch started in May 1930 and resulted in the German money supply, defined as currency and bank deposits, contracting by 17 percent from June 1930 to June 1931.

German policymakers displayed excessive confidence in market discipline as a sufficient mechanism to ensure the soundness of the banking sector, not least as German banks published balance sheet data every month, and also confidentially reported foreign debt data to the Reichsbank. By contrast, the Bank of France only gathered balance sheet information from the largest four commercial banks (Comptoir National d'Escompte de Paris, Crédit Industriel et Commercial, Crédit Lyonnais, and Société Générale) before a supervisory regime was first introduced in 1941. In June 1931, Reichsbank President Hans Luther assured his American counterpart George L. Harrison that "periodical publication of German banks' statements provides a safe means for judging their situation, which is safe despite large foreign withdrawals." Despite the apparent abundance of data, however, German public authorities' knowledge about the true state of banks' financial condition was systematically deficient. Conversely, the issue of foreign lending was heavily politicized in Germany and its importance correspondingly overestimated, not least because much of the "foreign capital" invested in Germany was actually round-tripping by German investors, e.g., via the Netherlands and Switzerland for tax avoidance.

Incipient financial instability occurred in Spring 1929, due to frictions in the reparations negotiations; July 1930, due to governmental crisis; and September 1930, due to the Nazi Party's strong showing in the 14 September 1930 Reichstag election. These episodes, however, were kept under control by the Reichsbank. Similarly, the collapse in August 1929 of insurer Frankfurter Allgemeine Versicherungs-AG (FAVAG) due to fraudulent management, known in Germany as the FAVAG scandal, turned out to be an idiosyncratic event and was perceived as such by depositors.

In France, an early wave of deposit flight occurred from October 1930 to February 1931, during which retail savers transferred their holdings on a large scale from small and mid-sized banks, for which no deposit guarantee existed, to cash, direct deposits at the Banque de France, and accounts at the de facto state-guaranteed savings banks. Several joint-stock and private banks failed as a consequence, such as Banque Oustric in October 1930 and Banque Adam in November 1930, and a severe credit crunch ensued.

In Austria, Creditanstalt was widely viewed as a pillar of financial stability given its history of market dominance and prudent management led by the Rothschild family. Its traditional strength, however, ironically became a vulnerability as the government leaned on it to absorb struggling banks, including Allgemeine Bodencreditanstalt and Union-Bank. Its governance was also disrupted by the emergence of the Bank of England as a major shareholder through the Anglo-International Bank, the former Anglo-Austrian Bank which had sold its Austrian operations to Creditanstalt in 1926 in an all-shares transaction. In 1930 and early 1931, the project of an Austro-German Customs Union generated additional friction, restricting the willingness of Austria's international creditors and especially France to support the country in moments of turmoil.

== Crisis ==
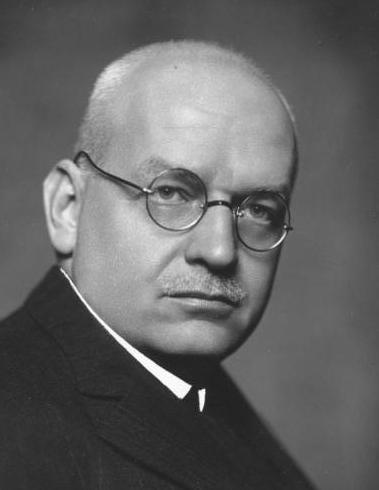
Hans Luther (1879–1962) was President of the Reichsbank during the events of July 1931

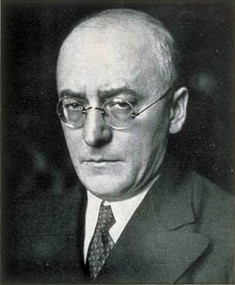
German Chancellor Heinrich Brüning (1885–1970) was ultimately responsible for the country's crisis management strategy

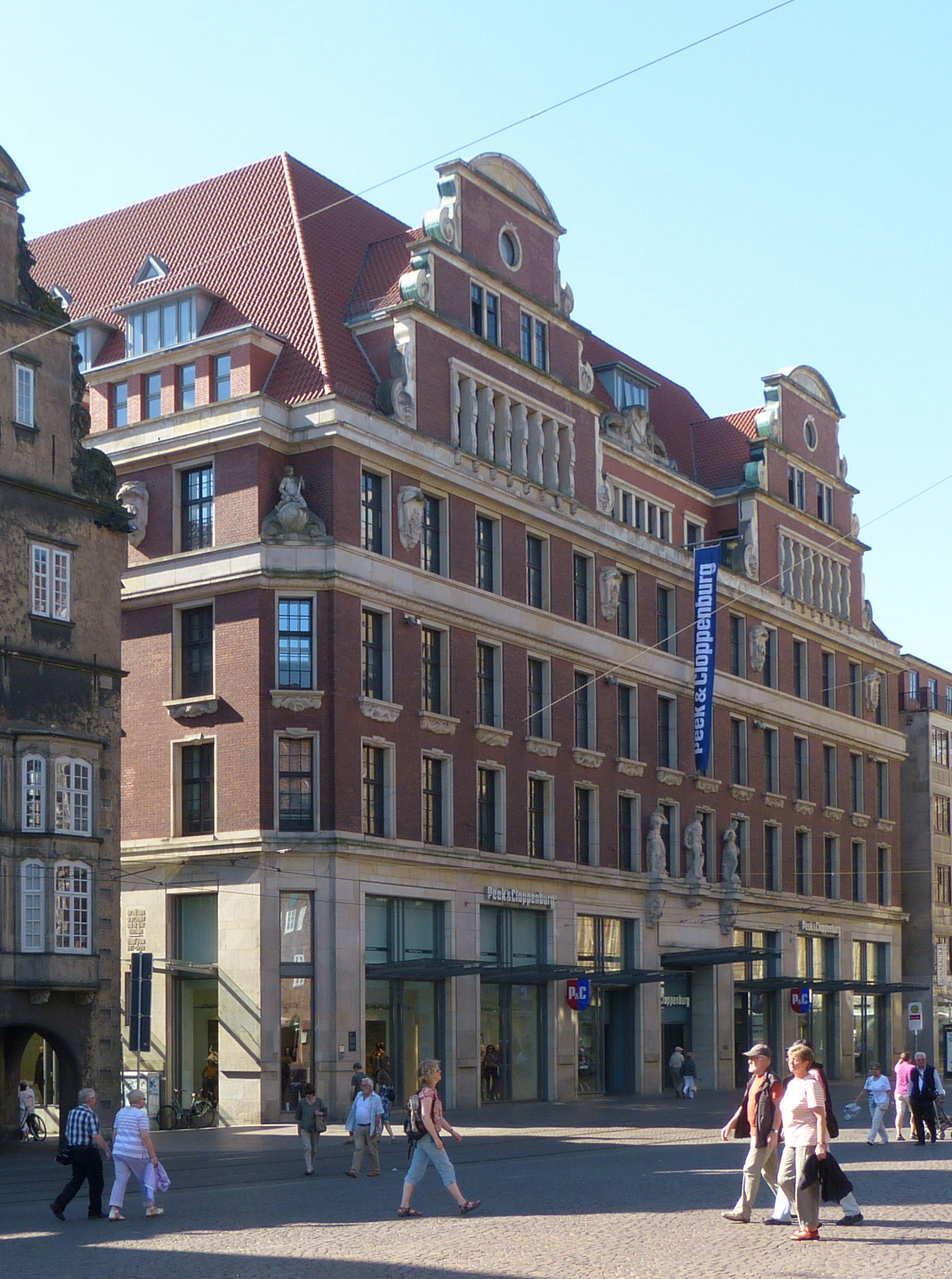
Bank- und Kaufhaus Obernstraße 2–12 in Bremen, head office in 1931 of the troubled Schröder-Bank

On 11 May 1931, Creditanstalt publicly announced that it would not be able to publish a financial statement. On 6 June 1931, the German government announced it would be unable to pay reparations as previously planned, triggering a parliamentary crisis. On 20 June 1931, U.S. President Herbert Hoover announced a one-year "holiday" or moratorium on the payment of political debts, known as the Hoover Moratorium, which brought some relief even though France initially opposed it. On 22 June 1931, the Reichsbank introduced restrictions on its domestic bill discounts, with the aim of disincentivizing transfers of money abroad by German firms – but this had a catastrophic effect, creating financial squeezes even for essentially sound firms.

From mid-June, concerns arose around a loan of 48 million Reichsmark that Danat-Bank had granted to struggling textile company Nordwolle, corresponding to 40 percent of its equity. On 4 July 1931, Danat-Bank ran out of discountable bills. The Reichsbank had to discontinue its liquidity assistance on 10 July 1931. On 13 July 1931, Danat publicly disclosed its inability to meet commitments, triggering a general panic as the public feared the Reichsbank was reaching the limits of its liquidity assistance capacity. The government declared a general bank holiday, starting on 14 July 1931. On 15 July 1931, the Reichsbank suspended the convertibility of the Reichsmark, effectively taking Germany out of the gold standard, and imposed capital controls. From 16 July 1931, some banking transactions were again authorized but with severe limits and restrictions, partly loosened on 20 July.

Meanwhile, the Reichsbank sponsored several mechanisms to facilitate the revival of interbank transactions. On 18 July 1931, it established a temporary Transfer Association (German: Überweisungsverband) to allow the system's core banks to transact among themselves without being bound by the general restrictions on payments: this started with 11 institutions, and expanded to 44 by 4 August 1931, after which the bank holiday restrictions were fully lifted and the Überweisungsverband was disbanded. Then, on 28 July 1931, the Akzept- und Garantiebank AG (later known as Akzeptbank) was set up to make interbank bills acceptable as collateral by the Reichsbank through credit enhancement. Its capital of 200 million Reichsmark was subscribed (albeit at 25 percent) by the government (40 percent), the Deutsche Golddiskontbank (a Reichsbank subsidiary, 10 percent), Deutsche Bank und Disconto-Gesellschaft (10 percent), Deutsche Zentralgenossenschaftskasse, Bank für Industrie-Obligationen, Deutsche Rentenbank-Kreditanstalt, Prussian State Bank, and Dresdner Bank (6 percent each), and other Berlin-based joint-stock banks (10 percent). The Akzeptbank's early activity was mainly focused on the largest problem banks, namely Danat-Bank, Dresdner Bank, Landesbank der Rheinprovinz as well as Bremen's Schröder-Bank, and lent to the Deutsche Girozentrale to support the network of savings banks.

The Reichsbank's subsidiary Deutsche Golddiskontbank acquired equity in the ailing joint-stock banks, and consequently became the owner of a 91-percent stake in Dresdner Bank (in which Danat-Bank had been forcibly merged), a 69-percent stake in Commerzbank (into which Barmer Bankverein was similarly merged), and a 35-percent stake in Deutsche Bank und Disconto-Gesellschaft. By contrast, the non-branch banks, Berliner Handels-Gesellschaft and Reichs-Kredit-Gesellschaft, neither requested nor received public financial assistance, although the latter was state-owned.

The unraveling of the gold standard continued after Germany's exit in mid-July, immediately followed by Hungary. The UK abandoned gold parity on 19 September 1931, and Austria did so on 8 October 1931. France remained on the gold standard until 1936, with a severe deflationary effect.

Significant banks collapsed in other countries as well. In Hungary, in addition to high foreign indebtedness, several banks had significant exposures to Austrian banks and were thus directly impacted by the Austrian banking turmoil. In the Kingdom of Yugoslavia, several banks became insolvent and were liquidated, acquired, or nationalized. In France, a new wave of deposit withdrawals from small and mid-sized banks occurred between July 1931 and January 1932, albeit on a slightly smaller scale than the previous one in late 1930,, and triggered the collapse of a significant bank, the Banque Nationale de Crédit which was restructured in early 1932 as the Banque Nationale pour le Commerce et l'Industrie. In Spain, Banco de Cataluña failed on 7 July 1931 together with two subsidiaries, Banco de Reus de Descuentos y Préstamos and Banco de Tortosa, causing a credit contraction in the whole of Catalonia.

Germany made "standstill agreements" with major creditor countries in August and September, following a conference in London on 20–23 July. The general bank holiday was lifted after three weeks on 5 August 1931. The Hoover moratorium, which aimed to protect longer-term exposures by imposing a standstill on short-term repayments, disproportionately impacted British merchant banks involved in trade finance to German counterparts, but also triggered a collapse in the value of German bonds, many of which had been underwritten by American institutions.

Political constraints linked to the controversies over war reparations, implying that the "appearance of prosperity" and visible public investment should be avoided, weighed negatively on key economic sectors such as the automobile market and infrastructure works. Economic historian Peter Temin concludes that Brüning "ruined the German economy — and destroyed German democracy — in the effort to show once and for all that Germany could not pay reparations." It remains debated, however, to what extent an alternative expansion strategy would have been viable. Harold James notes that the legacy of the hyperinflation episode of the early 1920s implied that public borrowing and spending could not be an appropriate strategy for crisis resolution, in Germany as in other Central European Countries, including Austria, Hungary, and Poland.

== Aftermath and legacy ==
The financial crisis sharply exacerbated the economic downturn that had started before mid-1931. The German turmoil of July 1931 generated powerful spillover effects on other countries, particularly the United States, which was uniquely exposed due to the structure of German post-WWI reparations. At the Lausanne Conference of July 1932, an agreement was outlined on a three-year suspension of German reparations, but that was rejected by the U.S. Congress in December 1932, triggering defaults by France and the UK on interallied war debts. Ultimately, losses of U.S. investors in German debt amounted to 13 to 16 percent of U.S. 1931 GDP, and the German debt problem would only be settled in 1953 with the London Agreement on German External Debts.

At its low point in 1932, German economic output had fallen 39 percent from its 1929 level. The large joint-stock banks were fully reprivatized in 1937. Capital controls were kept for an extended time period.

The crisis had major consequences for the development of prudential banking supervision in Germany, which had been essentially nonexistent (except for savings banks) before 1931. On 19 September 1931, a decree established the office of Reichskommissar für das Bankgewerbe (lit. 'Imperial Commissioner for Banking'), for which Chancellor Heinrich Brüning appointed Friedrich Ernst. In 1934, this was transformed into the Aufsichtsamt für das Kreditwesen, by new comprehensive banking legislation (German: Kreditwesengesetz of 5 December 1931). Initially, the Reichsbank was associated with the supervisory process through a newly established Supervisory Office. However, that role was transferred to the Economics Minister (German: Reichswirtschaftsminister) upon a legislative revision in 1939, and the Aufsichtsamt für das Kreditwesen itself was dissolved in 1944 with its duties taken over by the economics ministry. After World War II, banking supervision was devolved in West Germany to the Länder, until a national banking supervisor was re-established in 1962 as the Bundesaufsichtsamt für das Kreditwesen, which again cooperated closely with the Deutsche Bundesbank. Another decree on 6 October 1931 granted legal personality to the Sparkassen and reinforced their public supervision.

== Historiography ==
The financial crisis of 1931 has long been identified as a major contributor to the global economic depression of the early 1930s. In the early decades following the crisis, it was often described as a somewhat serendipitous crisis of confidence, in which the key mechanism was the withdrawal of short-term foreign deposits, or "hot money". Joseph Schumpeter described the crisis as triggered by "... vicissitudes [that] would have to be explained primarily in terms of accidents and external factors". This narrative was echoed in reference works such as those by Karl Erich Born or Gerd Hardach, and more recently by Thomas Ferguson and Peter Temin.

By contrast, historian Harold James has argued in 1984 that a domestic crisis of public finances was at the core of the German sequence, noting that domestic deposit flight predated the exodus of foreign investors by several critical weeks. In 2004, Isabel Schnabel identified it as twin crises in currency and banking markets, respectively, namely a "run on the Reichsmark" and a run on the banks viewed as "two independent causes". Schnabel thus similarly de-emphasized the centrality of foreign-currency aspects and noted the absence of currency mismatch in large banks' balance sheets despite high shares of foreign deposits. Schnabel also argued that the large Berlin-based universal banks were made to feel too big to fail by the Reichsbank's liquidity policy stance, contributing to moral hazard and uncontrolled balance sheet expansion in a context of increasing competition among banks. In 2014, economists Albrecht Ritschl and Samad Sarferaz found empirical evidence "consistent with the claim of Schnabel (2004) that Germany's 1931 crisis was causally a banking crisis, whereas monetary transmission under the Gold Standard played only a limited role."

The long-accepted causal link between the Creditanstalt collapse and the events in Germany has likewise been questioned in more recent historiography. Separately, recent research has demonstrated that France also experienced a major banking crisis, against a long-established view that the country had been spared. That view was distorted by the lack of accessible data beyond the country's four largest banks, which were comparatively unscathed. It was corrected by the rediscovery of a unique collection of balance-sheet data for most French banks, gathered by Crédit Lyonnais between 1901 and 1939, known as the Album.

== See also ==
- Panic of 1930
- Emergency Banking Act
