= A. Schaaffhausen'scher Bankverein =

Former German bank

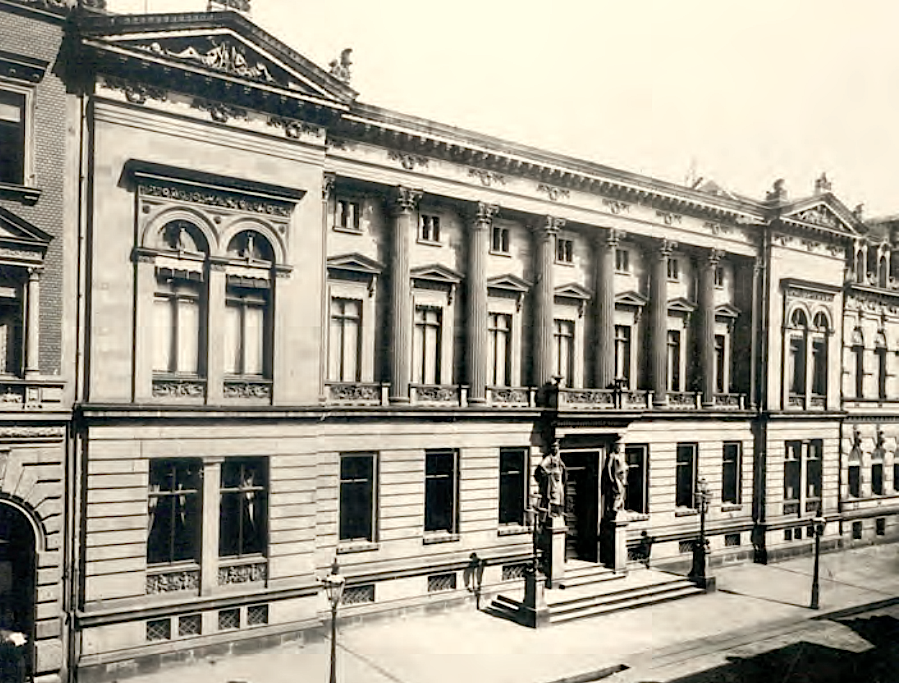
Former head office from 1863 to 1929, Unter Sachsenhausen 2 in Cologne, known as A. Schaaffhausen'sches Bankpalais; destroyed during World War II

The A. Schaaffhausen'scher Bankverein (lit. 'A. Schaaffhausen's bank union', sometimes simply referred to as Schaaffhausen) was a bank in Cologne, initially founded in 1791. In 1848 it was reorganized as a joint stock company; purchased in 1914 by the Berlin-based Disconto-Gesellschaft, and its brand finally disappeared in 1929 as the latter was in turn merged with Deutsche Bank.

== History ==
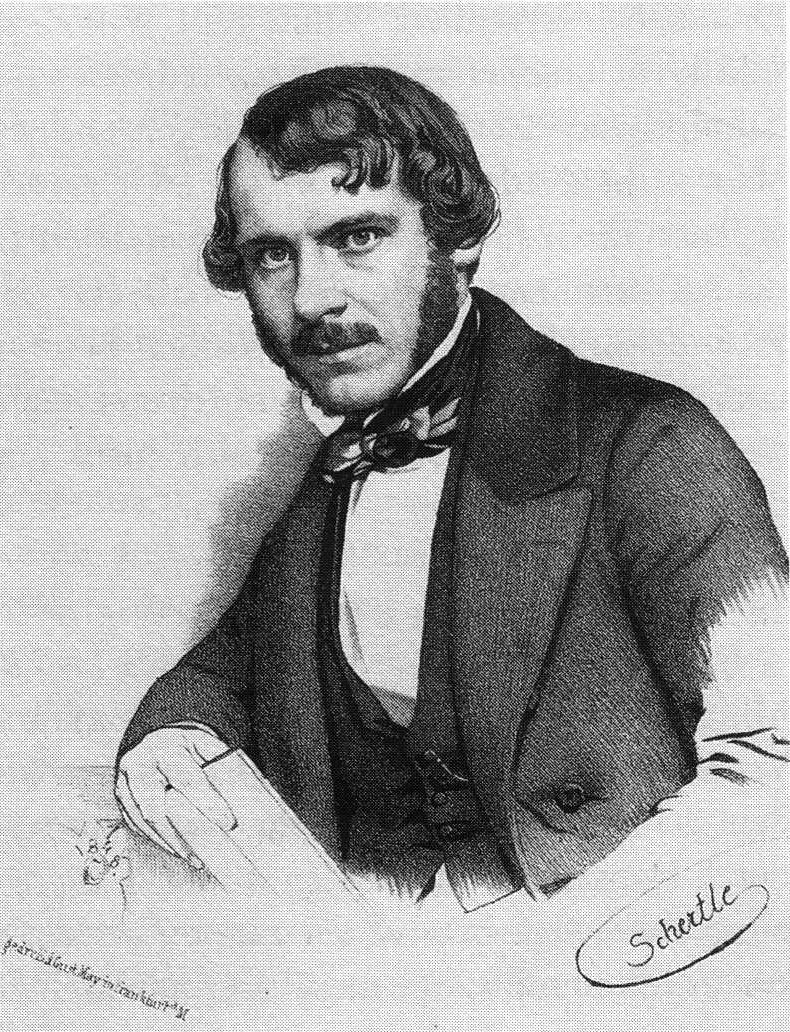
Gustav Mevissen (1815-1899) led the A. Schaaffhausen'scher Bankverein's creation and early development

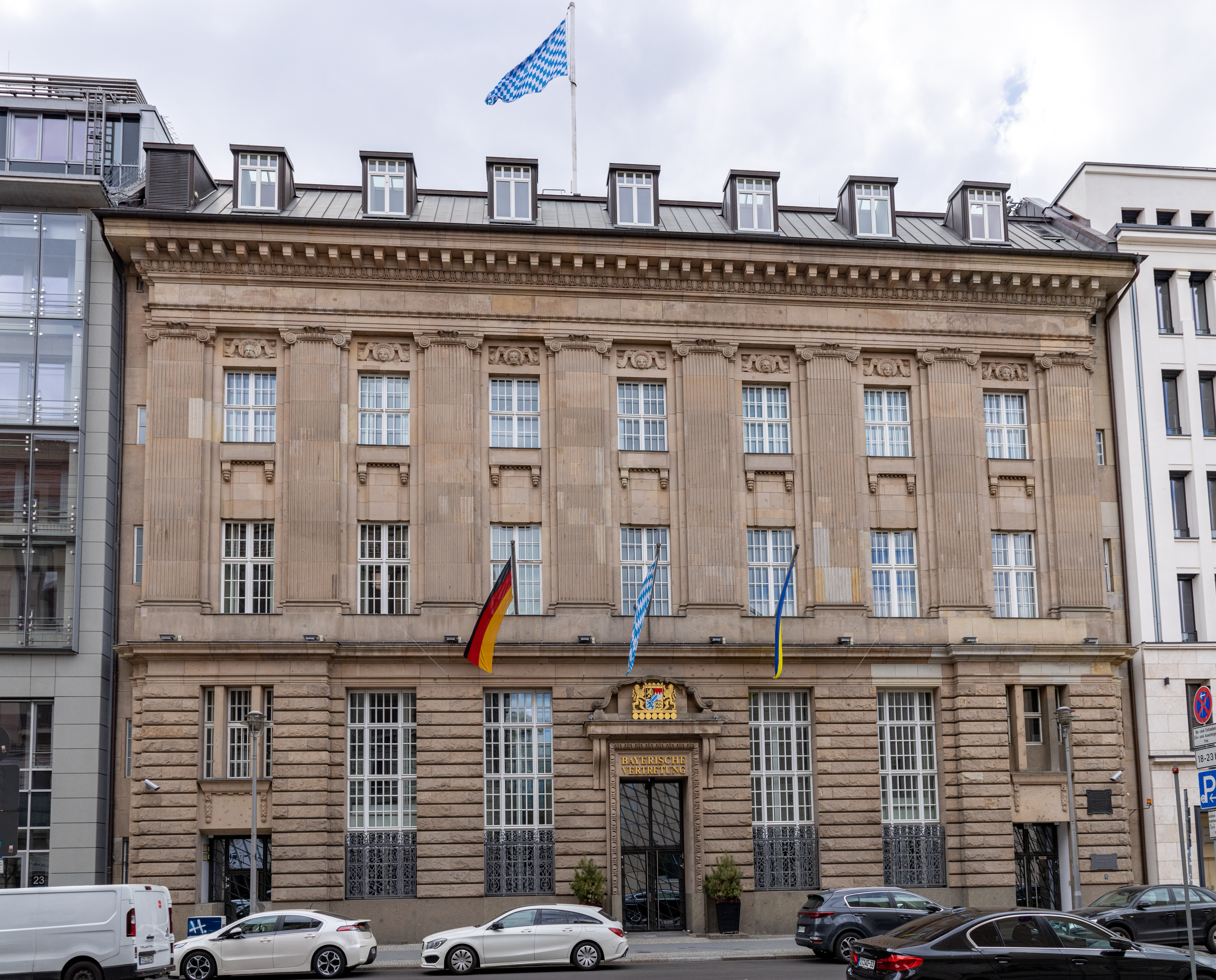
Building at Behrensstrasse 21-22 in Berlin, erected in 1896 by Schaaffhausen for its branch in the capital; later head office of the Reichs-Kredit-Gesellschaft, and lately Berlin representative office of Bavaria

In 1791, Abraham Schaaffhausen founded a private bank, one of the first and most important financial resources for the growing local economy and its incipient industrialization. In 1848, however, the bank was negatively affected by the Revolutions of 1848 and found itself facing bankruptcy. On 29 March 1848, as the bank became unable to honor its payment obligations, Prussian just-appointed Premier Ludolf Camphausen and his chosen finance minister David Hansemann started consultations to rescue the bank, together with their friend Gustav Mevissen who had just arrived in Berlin. The financial package was approved by the Prussian parliament (German: Landtag) on 10 April 1848 and prevented a financial collapse. The situation accelerated a debate about the creation of joint-stock companies, on which the Prussian authorities had until then been very reluctant. The transformation of the Schaaffhausen bank into an Aktiengesellschaft was thus voted by a creditors' meeting on 3 June 1848, and ratified by King Frederick William IV on 28 August 1848. The name "Bankverein" was chosen instead as plain "Bank", because the latter was associated at the time in Germany with note-issuing institutions. In October 1848, Mevissen was appointed to the new entity's management body ("Direktorium"), together with Schaaffhausen's son-in-law Wilhelm Ludwig Deichmann and former employee Victor Wendelstadt.

A few weeks after the Bankverein's establishment Camphausen and Hansemann were replaced by a conservative Prussian government led by Rudolf von Auerswald. As a consequence, Schaaffhausen remained as Prussia's only joint-stock bank for more than two decades, until the creation of Deutsche Bank in a radically different environment. The Disconto-Gesellschaft (est. 1851) became a Kommanditgesellschaft auf Aktien, a more restrictive legal form, in 1856, and the same option was retained for the creation of the Berliner Handels-Gesellschaft, also in 1856. Conversely, the Bank für Handel und Industrie was established as an Aktiengesellschaft in 1853, but for that it had to locate itself in the comparatively more liberal Grand Duchy of Hesse, in Darmstadt.

Its banking philosophy may be inferred from an excerpt from the annual report for 1852 — “the function of a great banking institution is not so much to start new branches of industry . . ., as to induce the capitalists of the country, by recommendations based on exhaustive investigations, to turn idle capital toward such enterprises, which, when properly launched in response to existing requirements, and offering the guarantee of expert management, bid fair to yield reasonable profits.” Industrial in purpose, current account business was secondary, and deposits were received only on condition of three, six and 12 months' notice being given for their withdrawal, and then only at a low rate of interest. The close identification from the first with the prosperous and flourishing Rhineland-Westphalia industry, and the strict adherence to its original purpose, lent strength to the Bankverein to weather the financial crisis of 1857 without the necessity of canceling any of its outstanding credits — a strong factor in extending its influence during succeeding years. One after another it nurtured industrial enterprises within its banking zone, each becoming an added source of strength for Schaaffhausen. By 1852, Schaaffhausen was able to pay back the aid it had received from the state.. In 1857, the government guarantee was lifted.

In 1891 a branch was opened at Berlin, the parent institution remaining the only one of the large German banks having its headquarters outside of Berlin. Its managing director Carl Klönne tried to convince the bank's supervisory board to move the head office to the capital but his plan was rejected, leading to his resignation and departure to the rival Deutsche Bank, which subsequently took over some of the Bankverein's previous customer base. On its core turf of the Rhineland and Ruhr area, Schaaffhausen now had to compete with other banks such as the Essener Credit-Anstalt and the Bergisch-Märkische Bank. It thus expanded with branches in western Germany, and in 1904 took over the Bonn-based Westdeutsche Bank with its own network of branches. By 1912 it was established in 11 locations in the Rhineland.

In March 1870, Schaaffhausen participated in the creation of Deutsche Bank, with a 3 percent share, and Victor Wendelstadt became a board member there. It was also involved, together with other German banks, in the creation of foreign-oriented ventures such as the Deutsch-Asiatische Bank in Shanghai (1889), Banca Commerciale Italiana in Milan (1894), Banque Internationale de Bruxelles (1898), and Deutsche Orientbank in Berlin (1905). Even so, its overseas activity remained limited. In its pursuit of growth, in 1903 Schaaffhausen initiated a strategic partnership with Dresdner Bank that entailed an equal sharing of profits, which however fell apart in 1908.

In 1908, Schaaffhausen maintained representation on the boards of 94 other industrial and financial institutions. The capital of the Bankverein that year was 145,000,000 marks, and it made a profit of 34,157,125 marks. The total capital power of the A. Schaaffhausen'scher Bankverein group was (1908) 278,538,001 marks, of which 231,000,000 marks constituted the capital, and 47,538,001 marks the surplus. In 1913 the A. Schaaffhausen'scher Bankverein was the largest German regional bank (i.e. joint-stock bank not headquartered in Berlin).

In 1914, faced with a failure to grow fast enough on a stand-alone basis, Schaaffhausen agreed to be taken over by the Disconto-Gesellschaft. The terms of the acquisition allowed the Bankverein to retain autonomous operations in the Rhineland, while its activity in Berlin was discontinued. That arrangement lasted until 1929, when the Disconto-Gesellschaft merged with the Deutsche Bank, and A. Schaaffhausen'scher Bankverein was fully absorbed in the new combined entity.

== Leadership ==
- Gustav von Mevissen, General manager 1848–1857 and board chair 1857-1875
- Karl Mathy, Director 1854–1855
- Carl Klönne, General manager 1879–1900
- Hermann Fischer, Manager 1912–1919
- Georg Solmssen, General manager 1914-1924
- Robert Pferdmenges, General Manager 1924-1929

== See also ==
- Disconto-Gesellschaft
- Darmstädter Bank
- List of banks in Germany
