= BHF Bank =

Former German bank

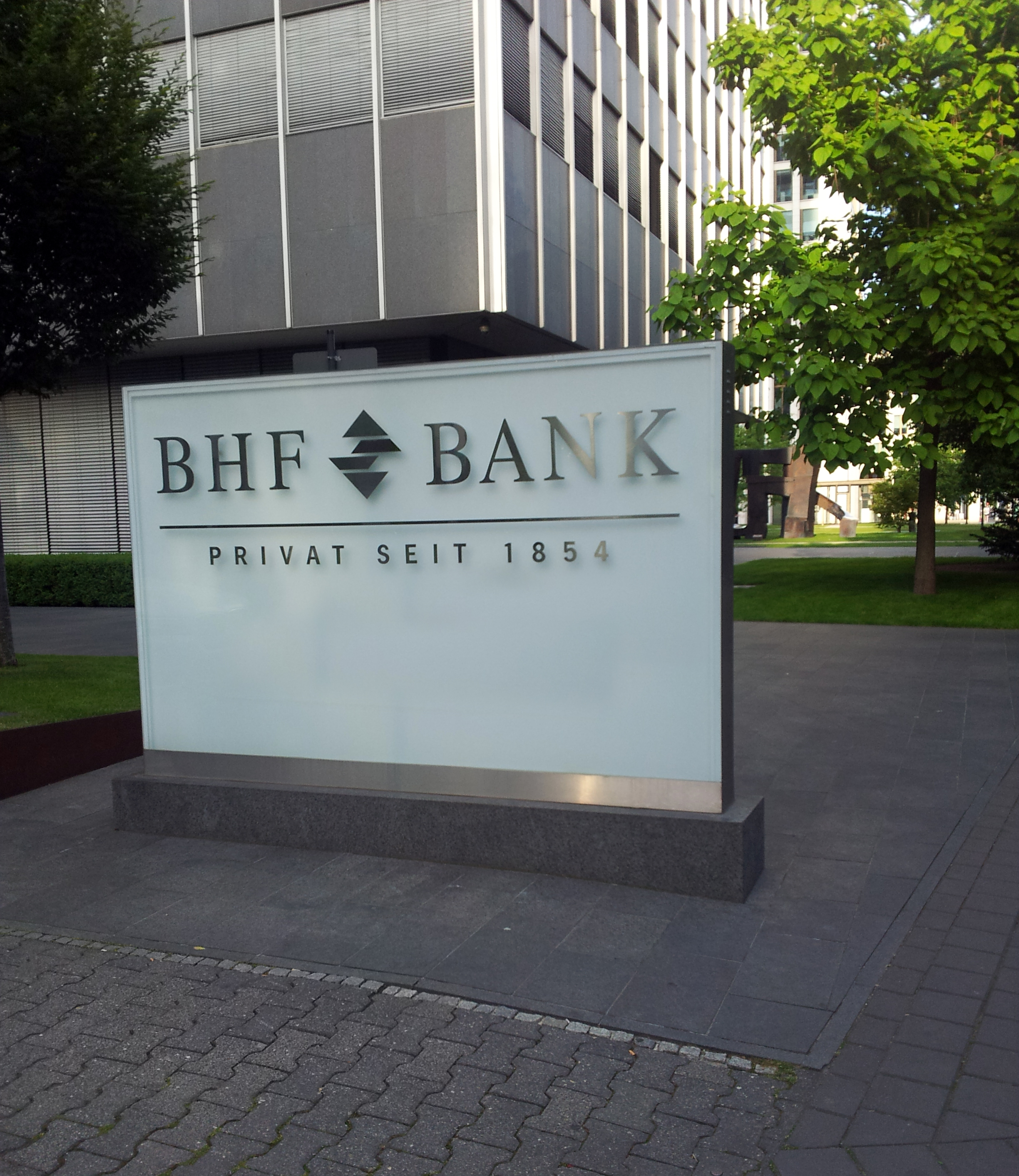
- Sign at the headquarters in 2014

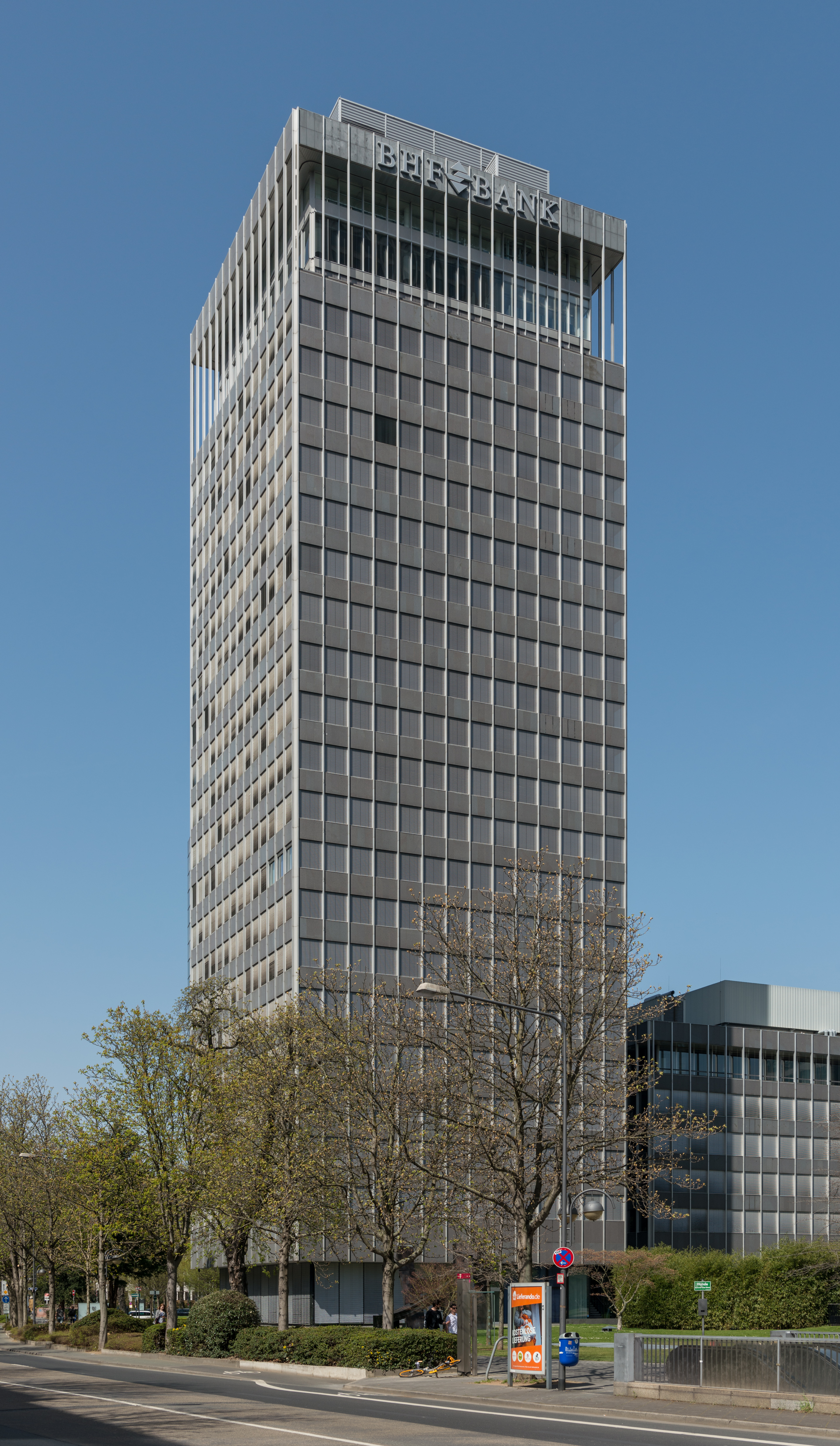
- BHF Bank Tower in Frankfurt, photographed in 2018
- Company type: Corporation (Aktiengesellschaft)
- Industry: Financial services
- Predecessors: Berliner Handels-Gesellschaft and Frankfurter Bank
- Founded: 1970
- Defunct: 2014
- Fate: Acquired by Oddo & Cie
- Successor: ODDO BHF
- Headquarters: Frankfurt, Germany
- Area served: Germany
- Products: Banking services, private banking
- Owner: ING Group followed by Sal. Oppenheim and followed by Kleinwort Benson
- Website: www.bhf-bank.com Archived December 31, 2010, at the Wayback Machine

BHF Bank, full name Berliner Handels- und Frankfurter Bank was a German bank formed in 1970 by merger between the Berliner Handels-Gesellschaft and Frankfurter Bank, both founded in the 1850s. It was initially named Berliner Handels-Gesellschaft – Frankfurter Bank (lit. 'Trade Company of Berlin – Bank of Frankfurt') and was rebranded BHF Bank in 1975.

BHF Bank was among the largest commercial banks in Germany, but experienced relative decline under successive ownership of ING Group and Sal. Oppenheim. It was eventually acquired by Paris-based Oddo & Cie which subsequently renamed itself ODDO BHF.

== History ==
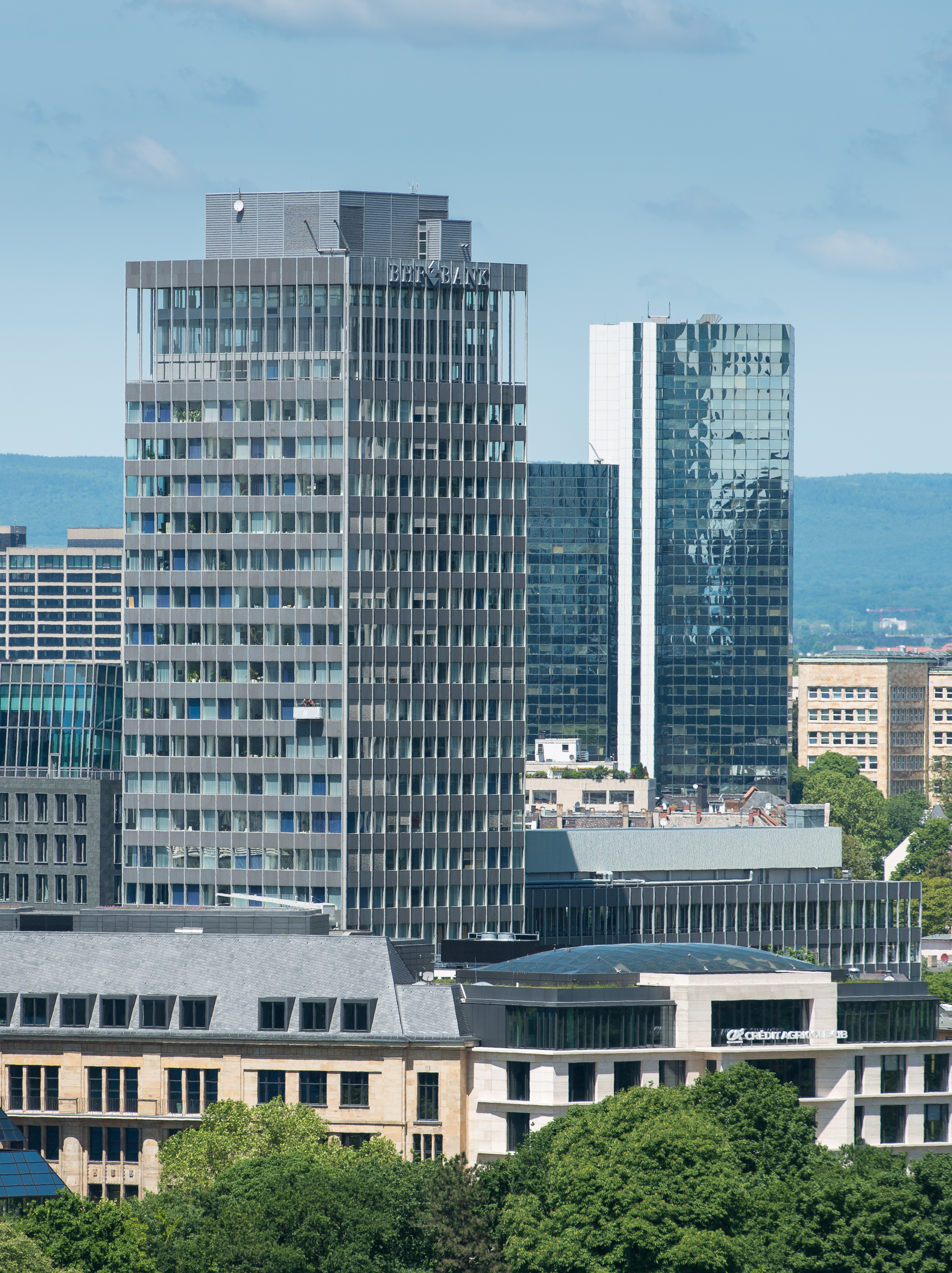
Headquarters of BHF-Bank in Frankfurt am Main

BHF Bank was formed on 1 September 1970 (with retroactive effect at 1 January 1970) from the merger of the Frankfurter Bank, founded in 1854, and the Berliner Handels-Gesellschaft; founded in 1856. Also in 1970, the bank's high-rise head office, initially commissioned by Berliner Handels-Gesellschaft and designed by architect Sep Ruf, was inaugurated, by then the highest building in Frankfurt. In 1975, the bank was renamed to BHF Bank. Throughout the 1970s and 1980s, it was in the top three to five investment banks in West Germany and had a top position in the foreign exchange market.

In 1995, the bank went public, changing from a partnership to a corporation. From 1999 to 2004, it was bought by the Dutch ING Group and renamed, in 2002, the ING BHF-Bank. In the same year, it was delisted; its remaining shareholders were squeezed out.

In 2004, ING BHF-Bank was split. The majority of the bank's business operations, offices, and equity shareholdings were integrated into the newly founded BHF-BANK Aktiengesellschaft, which was then acquired by the private bank Sal. Oppenheim as its sole shareholder. Sal. Oppenheim was taken over by the Deutsche Bank in 2010; BHF-BANK, which has always operated on a stand-alone basis, was put up for sale.

In 2014, the bank pertained to BHF Kleinwort Benson Group, which was taken over by the French private bank Oddo et Cie. By mid-March 2016, Oddo et Cie acquired 100% of the Group's shares and has thus become BHF-BANK's indirect sole shareholder. In April 2017, the company was renamed ODDO BHF.

== See also ==
- Deutsche Hypothekenbank
- BHF Kleinwort Benson Group
- List of banks in Germany
