= Westdeutsche Landesbank =

Former German public bank

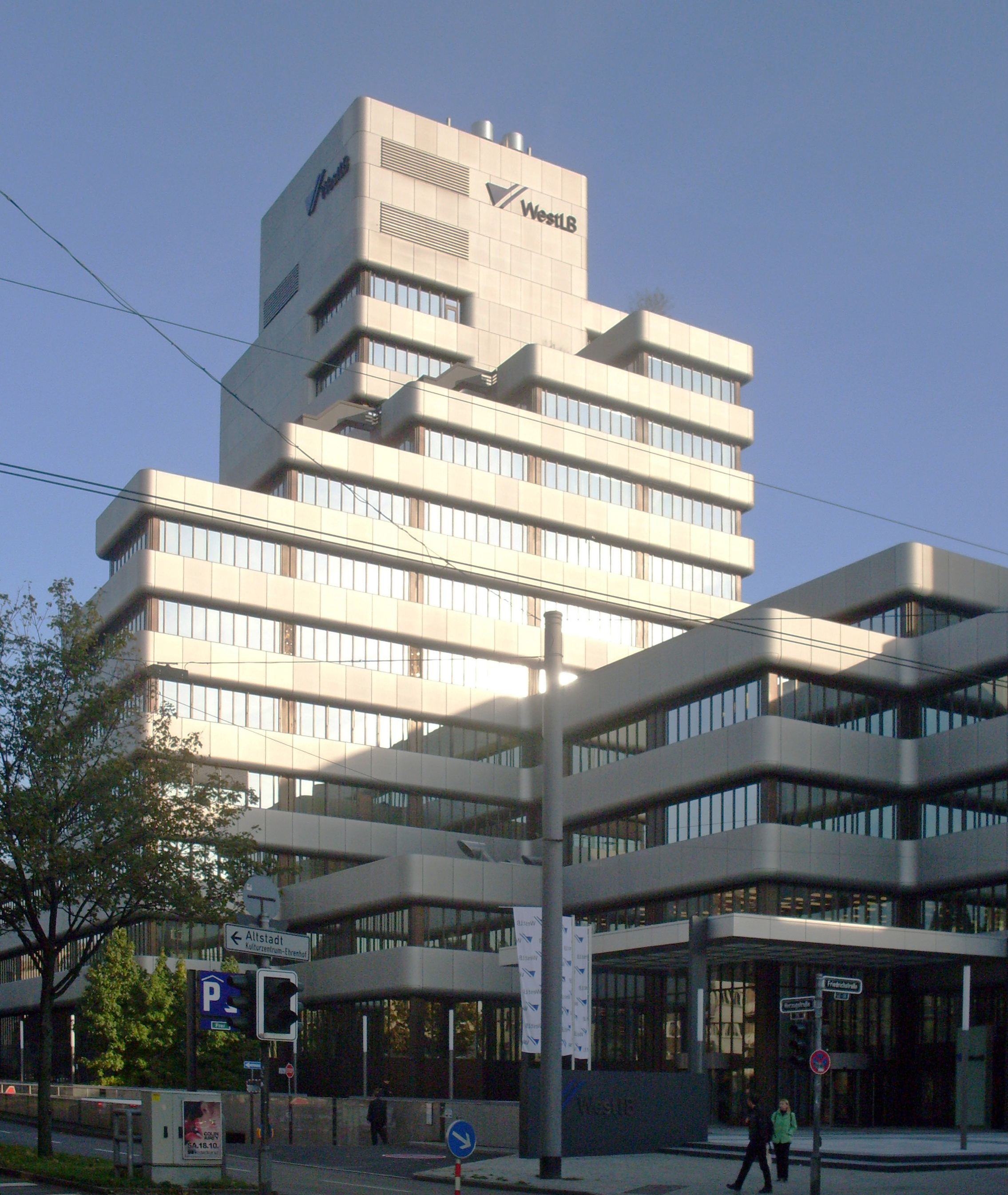

Westdeutsche Landesbank (lit. 'Western German Provincial Bank', abbreviated as WestLB) was a major German bank based in Düsseldorf, mainly controlled by the German state of North Rhine-Westphalia. It was created in 1969 by the merger of two predecessor entities respectively for the Rhineland and Westphalia. As a Landesbank, WestLB's core business was wholesale banking on behalf of the region's Sparkassen, but it expanded into numerous risky activities that ultimately led to its restructuring and dismantlement in the late 2000s. As of 30 June 2012, the residual operations of WestLB were transferred to a legacy non-bank entity, Portigon Financial Services AG.

== Background ==
WestLB's origins go back to an unusual initiative of the Swedish government, which in 1818 offered 160,000 taler to the Prussian province of Westphalia as reparation for damages inflicted by Swedish and Dutch forces during the Napoleonic Wars. Prussian statesman Karl von Vincke declared that sum the property of all Westphalia to be used for economic development and infrastructure. The Westphalian Provinzialbank-Hülfskasse (lit. 'Westphalian Provincial Bank and Support Fund') was established for that purpose in Münster in 1832, sometimes referred to as the first-ever Landesbank. This in turn inspired the creation of a similar institution in the neighboring Prussian Rhine Province, the Rheinische Provinzial-Hülfskasse founded in Cologne in 1854 and relocated in Düsseldorf in 1877. The two provincial banks played a significant role in the dynamic industrial development of the Rhineland and Westphalia until World War I. They were renamed Landesbank der Provinz Westfalen and Landesbank der Rheinprovinz in 1890 and 1888 respectively.

The Landesbank der Rheinprovinz engaged in aggressive risk-taking during the 1920s and failed spectacularly in the European banking crisis of 1931. Its operations were restructured and transferred in 1935 to the newly formed Rheinische Girozentrale und Provinzialbank. In 1969, the latter merged with Landesbank für Westfalen to form Westdeutsche Landesbank.

== Creation and development ==
The new merged bank was incorporated on January 1, 1969, with seat in Düsseldorf on the same location as the defunct Landesbank der Rheinprovinz. It ambitioned to challenge the domination of the German financial landscape by the "big three" commercial banks (Deutsche Bank, Dresdner Bank, and Commerzbank). In narrow terms, this ambition succeeded when WestLB became Germany's third-largest lending institution in 1976. That same year, it attempted but failed to take over the ailing Hessische Landesbank.

The new heavyweight soon had to face controversy, however. In 1973 it posted more than US$150 million in foreign-exchange losses, the result of unauthorized speculative trading by employees who were subsequently fired. In December 1977, Ludwig Poullain, who had become WestLB's CEO at its creation in 1969, announced intent to resign, but was instead fired by the Supervisory Board for gross neglect. In 1978 he was charged with bribery, fraud, and malfeasance regarding a US$465,000 consulting fee he received from controversial financier Josef Schmidt. Poullain had allegedly not properly disclosed to the Supervisory Board items that included the terms of his consulting engagement, a loan he had simultaneously granted to Schmidt for the same sum, and Schmidt's legal issues at the time. He later claimed that the charges were politically motivated, and in 1981 was cleared of them all.

Profits again dropped by two-thirds in the fiscal year 1980, leading to calls for the departure of Poullain's successor Johannes Völling, who eventually resigned in July 1981. He was succeeded by Friedel Neuber, the head of the Rhineland Federation of Savings Banks, who had no professional banking experience. In mid-1982, WestLB raised DM1.12 billion in new capital, mostly from the North Rhine-Westphalia state government. By the mid-1980s, WestLB expanded its international operations, including through a 1986 arrangement to sell securities on the Tokyo exchange. In May 1988, together with other major German banks, it provided large-scale loans to the Soviet Union, and (through a Swiss subsidiary) purchased Moscow's first foreign bond issuance since the 1917 revolution. A renewed attempt to acquire Hessische Landesbank failed again in late 1988.

In January 2001 after WestLB had notified banking investigators about very large sums moving between offshore vehicles and Trans World Group accounts at WestLB, Düsseldorf prosecutors uncovered DM15 billion ($7 billion) had passed through WestLB, Commerzbank, Dresdner Bank, and Deutsche Bank.

On August 30, 2002, WestLB was converted into an Aktiengesellschaft (joint stock company), and its promotional banking operations were transferred to NRW.BANK. On July 19, 2005, public guarantees provided by the local government, including the so-called institutional liability (German: Anstaltslast) and guarantor liability (German: Gewährträgerhaftung) were abolished. These changes implemented an agreement with the European Commission known in Germany as the Brüsseler Konkordanz, under which WestLB and the other Landesbanks would concentrate on competitive commercial operations.

Total assets of the group were €288.1 bn as of December 31, 2008 (€292.1bn as of September 30, 2006) with operations spread over eleven countries in Europe, six countries in The Americas, six countries in Asia, Australia and South Africa, including significant investment banking operations in New York City, London, Luxembourg, Tokyo and Hong Kong.

== Downfall ==
In February 2008, as the global credit crisis evolved, WestLB was allocated a 5bn Euros guarantee by North Rhine Westphalia and a group of local banks. The bank was reported to have suffered from exposure to investments in structured credits.

In November 2008, the board of WestLB announced that it intended to obtain state loan guarantees and look at raising additional capital from the government of Germany specially set up bailout fund. There are also any ideas to merge the WestLB with other state owned banks or to rearrange segments of the WestLB in the German system of state owned banks.

As of May 10, 2009, WestLB's shareholders were:

- 30.862% NRW.BANK (also partly owned by North Rhine-Westphalia)
- 25.032% Rheinischer Sparkassen- und Giroverband
- 25.032% Sparkassenverband Westfalen-Lippe
- 17.766% State of North Rhine-Westphalia

In November 2009, 85 billion in problem assets were transferred from WestLB to a winding up agency called Erste Abwicklungsanstalt (EAA), colloquially also called 'bad bank'.

As per 30 June 2012, the brand WestLB was given up and the remaining company continued to operate under the name of Portigon Financial Services AG. Besides, EAA and another organisation under the roof of Hessian and Thuringian Landesbank Helaba are dealing with the aftermath of the quasi bankruptcy and carrying on with core functions of the former WestLB.

== Leadership ==
- 1969–1978: Ludwig Poullain
- 1978–1981: Johannes Völling
- 1981–2001: Friedel Neuber
- 2001–2003: Jürgen Sengera
- 2003–2004: Johannes Ringel
- 2004–2007: Thomas R. Fischer
- 2007–2008: Alexander Stuhlmann
- 2008–2009: Heinz Hilgert
- 2009–2012: Dietrich Voigtländer

== See also ==
- Landesbank
- German public banking sector
- List of banks in Germany
