= Deutsche Golddiskontbank =

The Deutsche Golddiskontbank (also Golddiskontbank, and abbreviated Dego) was a state-owned special bank founded in 1924 to promote German export industry by financing raw material imports. It was liquidated in 1945.

== The purpose of the Deutsche Golddiskontbank ==
Reichsbank President Hjalmar Schacht founded the Goldnotenbank, the first name of the later Deutsche Golddiskontbank, on 19 March 1924 to draw foreign exchange to Germany by issuing shares to foreign banks. The Golddiskontbank also was given the right to issue notes, but it never used it. The bank saw itself not as a currency bank, but as a discount and credit bank. The primary tasks and goals of the Golddiskontbank were to aid the restarting of the German economy by lending to support export trade and the purchase of raw materials and other goods; to generate the necessary funds for the Reich to pay for Treaty of Versailles reparations; and to ensure the stability of the German currency.

The bank's main mission was to grant loans to German exporters. The loans were made available at interest rates that were far below the usual rates. The Dego raised the necessary funds by conducting rediscount agreements abroad, and by lending its own share capital.

In the run-up to its founding there were many discussions regarding the payment of reparations. There were fears that a gold central bank would only be a reparation bank. The bank's mission to provide itself with gold and foreign exchange from abroad aroused, among other things, the fear of becoming dependent on foreign countries and thus giving them a greater say in financial and economic matters.

== Establishment and development of the Golddiskontbank ==
The share capital of the bank was 10 million pounds, which corresponded to 200 million gold marks. The Golddiskontbank's share capital was issued in pounds sterling, since the pound was a strong currency, respected in the banking world, and that ultimately the German economy was dependent on the British financial markets. In addition, this made it more attractive for foreign banks to invest in the Golddiskontbank. The shares were issued at £10 each, divided into two groups, A and B. Group A subscribed for half of the share capital. This part was purchased exclusively by the Reichsbank. The £5 million comprising the shares of Group B were bought by a banking consortium consisting exclusively of German banks, who offered the shares at home and abroad for public subscription. In order not to lose majority voting control, Reichsbank also acquired part of the B share package. In order to raise those £5 million, Reichsbank took out a long-term loan from the Bank of England.

In theory, the bank also had the right to issue banknotes for a total amount of £5 million (100 million gold marks), a right that the bank never made use of. The right to issue banknotes could be withdrawn by the Reichsbank, and only a few months after the foundation of the bank the Reichsbank Act revoked the right to issue banknotes.

The Dego was exempt from any Reich, state and municipal taxes. It claimed independence from political influence, and its business was to be subject to strict separation from public finances. No loans were allowed to be granted to the Reich, the states or the municipalities. However, after the efforts of Reichsbank President Schacht, the business of the Golddiscount Bank was expanded, so that it was used to manage public money from the spring of 1927.

The organization of the Golddiskontbank consisted of the Executive Board, Supervisory Board, and the Advisory Board, all subject to the shareholders' Annual General Meeting. The Reichsbank provided its organization and administration. The legal requirements were the same as for the other German central banks. When the bank was founded, there was a fear that foreign bank shareholders would demand representation on the supervisory board or in the administration of the bank and thus indirectly or directly influence German financial policy. Although this was actually intended at the beginning by the Allied powers, which saw the Golddiskontbank only as a temporary solution pending creation of a currency bank, this did not happen. All positions and positions in the administration as well as on the supervisory board were filled by employees of Reichsbank.

The Golddiskontbank received the additional task of currency stabilization. In 1926, for example, the Golddiskontbank purchased medium-term Pfandbriefe (3–5 years) from the Rentenbankkreditanstalt at a very low interest rate. However, the main field of activity was still the granting of credit to German exporters of industrial products. The funds for this were generated by the Golddiskontbank by concluding rediscount agreements. From the end of that year, the Golddiskontbank also issued so-called sola bills to relieve the crowded short-term money market. In the law of 1 December 1930, the Golddiskontbank was reorganized.

The European banking crisis of 1931 increased credit demand. Disproportionately many loans were called in from abroad, creating a crisis of confidence in the domestic financial world, which led to a credit shortage, which in turn led to an increased demand for low-interest loans from the Golddiskontbank. Its annual report of the year speaks of an "unprecedented crisis". In order for the Golddiskontbank to be able to inject more capital for this task, shares of Group C were issued, which increased the share capital by 200 million Reichsmark and which were completely bought up by Reichsbank. This money was used to rehabilitate banks in difficulty. Golddiskontbank drew on standby loans, e.g. a loan of 50 million dollars from the International Acceptance Bank (New York), which was then made available to the Reichsbank via the Golddiskontbank.

In this crisis year, a standstill agreement was concluded with foreign banks with the participation of the Golddiskontbank. The contractual partners on the German side were the Reichsbank and a standstill committee of the German economy. The agreement guaranteed that foreign banks would not call in German banks' loans. The Golddiskontbank guaranteed part of the loans, which in turn were covered by guarantees from the German government. The standstill agreement was supplemented by a further credit agreement in 1932 and renewed annually until 1954.

== The Golddiskontbank in the Nazi years, 1933-1945 ==
After the National Socialists took power, the Golddiskontbank also played a role in arms financing. The Mefo exchanges specially created for this purpose were not financed directly on the money market, but indirectly placed in the form of block and sola exchanges of the Golddiskontbank.

The Dego also became associated with implementing the foreign exchange regulations imposed by the Nazis on Jewish refugees. Jews who intended to emigrate had to transfer their securities holdings to the Prussian State Bank, either directly or via their own bank. These banks in turn transferred the securities to a blocked custody account in favor of the Prussian State Bank. The emigrants lost all rights to the securities once they had been transferred to the special custody account "Reich Ministry of Economics - Export Promotion Fund - Capital Transfer" at the Prussian State Bank. The Prussian State Bank, acting as trustee of the Reich Ministry of Economics, sold the securities and transferred the proceeds to an account with the Golddiskontbank in favor of the Reich Ministry of Economics. The Golddiskontbank, working on behalf of the Reich Ministry of Economics, reduced the foreign exchange raised from the sale by a discount specified by the Reich Ministry of Economics. The funds reduced by this amount were then transferred in foreign currency to the emigrant's personal bank.

The Golddiskontbank was also involved in transactions concerning cash and other goods of Jewish emigrants. For example, if cash amounts were to be transferred, the Jewish emigrant's bank had to transfer the amounts to the Golddiskontbank, which then credited it to an account of the Reich Ministry of Economics. The Golddiskontbank, in turn, then exchanged the cash into foreign currency at a considerable discount to market prices.

Movable goods and other assets were only allowed to be brought abroad with the permission of the responsible foreign exchange office. The authorization was only granted if a so-called Dego levy was paid to the Reich Ministry of Economics, which maintained an account with the Golddiskontbank for this purpose.

During the war, the Golddiskontbank continued to trade in solas, and it also increasingly took over price hedging transactions. To this end, the Golddiskontbank granted loans to secure claims that were unlikely to be paid because of the war.

== Liquidation ==
Both the Deutsche Reichsbank and Deutsche Golddiskontbank were shut down in 1945 and their functions were transferred to successor institutions. The draft law on the liquidation of Deutsche Reichsbank and Deutsche Golddiskontbank provided for the dissolution of the institutions and compensation of shareholders under the currency reform of 1948. The Dego, which had been dormant since 1945, was dissolved on 1 October 1961. The private shareholders who were compensated were mostly foreign institutional shareholders who held 1/7th of the shares. Liquidation deadline was on 30 September 1969. The shares became the property of the Bundesbank; the Oberfinanzdirektion Berlin was appointed to manage the remaining accounts of the former Golddiskontbank.

== Personnel ==
- Rudolf Löb, Member of the Supervisory Board and Working Committee of the Supervisory Board from 1924
- Georg von Simson, Member of the Supervisory Board and Working Committee of the Supervisory Board from 1924
- Hermann Kissler, Member of the Supervisory Board from 1924
- Hermann Junne, CEO 1939 to 1945

== Other Literature ==
- Haus, Rudolf: Die Deutsche Golddiskontbank. [The Deutsche Golddiskontbank]. Cologne 1959.
- Whale, Philip Barrett: Joint Stock Banking in Germany. A Study of the German Creditbanks Before and After the War. (1930 edition reprint) London 1968 ([ online]).
- Gabler Bank Dictionary: Handwörterbuch für das Banken- und Sparkassenwesen mit Bankenverzeichnis. [Handbook of Banks and savings banks with banking directory.] (9th Edition) Wiesbaden 1983.
- Handbuch der deutschen Aktiengesellschaften. [Handbook of German stock corporations]. 48th year (1943). Volume 4. Verlag Hoppenstedt.
