= Philippe Oddo =

French financier

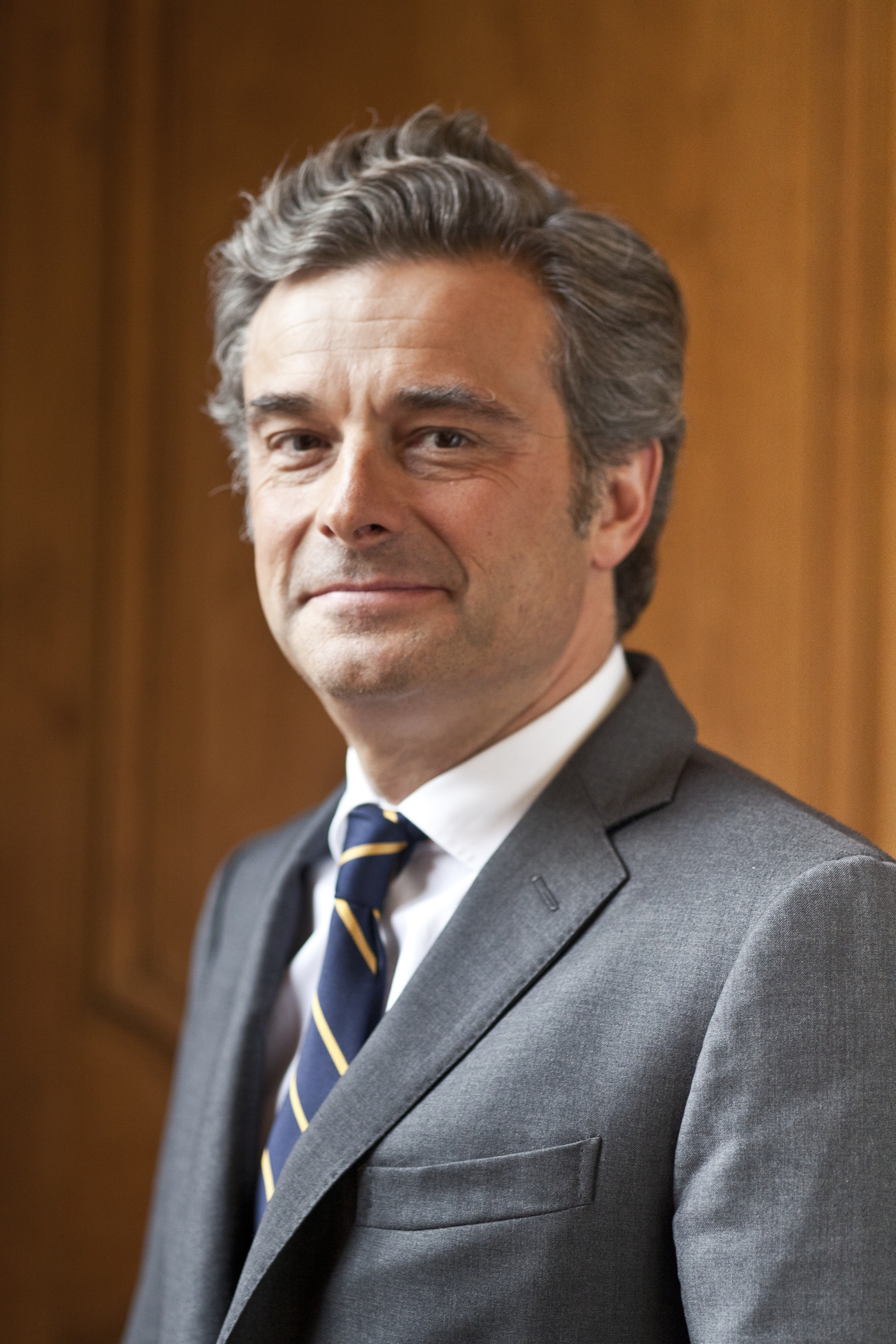
- Born: September 26, 1959 (age 67); 8th arrondissement of Paris, France
- Education: Paris Dauphine University; University of Cologne; New York University; HEC Paris
- Occupation: Banker

Philippe Oddo (born 26 September 1959, in the 8th arrondissement of Paris) is a French financier and a managing partner of the ODDO BHF group.

== Early life and education ==
Oddo is the son of Bernard Oddo, a foreign exchange broker, and Colette Rathery. General Paul Oddo was his uncle. He graduated from HEC Paris in 1984. He also studied at Paris Dauphine University, New York University, and the University of Cologne in Germany.

== Career ==
Oddo joined Oddo & Cie in 1984 and became a managing partner in 1987.

At the head of the group, Oddo diversified the bank's activities, particularly in the private banking and corporate banking sectors. Several acquisitions were carried out, such as the purchase of Delahaye Finance (1997), Pinatton, Crédit Lyonnais Securities Europe, Banque d’Orsay, and Banque Robeco.

ODDO BHF is one of the banks that allocates the most resources to research and financial analysis relative to its income.

In 2017, Oddo and his family were ranked 101st in the French Fortune list by the magazine Challenges, with €800 million.

== Other activities ==
=== Corporate boards ===
- Euronext, Member of supervisory board (2007–2015)

=== Non-profit organizations ===
- European School of Management and Technology (ESMT), Member of the International Advisory Council
- Bettencourt-Schueller Foundation, Member of the Board of Directors (since December 2011).
- Fondation pour la Recherche sur Alzheimer (IFRAD), Member of the Board of Directors
- Mouvement des entreprises de taille intermédiaire (METI), Vice-chairman
- Le Siècle, Member
- Senckenberg Nature Research Society, Member of the Board of Trustees
