= Carl Klönne =

German banker

- Born: 26 May 1850; Solingen, Rhine Province, Prussia
- Died: 20 May 1915 (aged 64); Berlin, Germany
- Occupation: Banker
- Spouse: Ida Andreae (1856–1932)
- Parent(s): Carl Klönne (1824–1883); Emilie Kölker (1829–1878)

Carl Klönne (26 May 1850 – 20 May 1915) was a German banker. He was a director of a number of banks and was finally a director of Deutsche Bank between 1900 and 1914 where he brought a new approach to bank lending.

== Early life and education ==
Carl Klönne was born in Solingen, a city famous for centuries as a centre for sword and knife making which during the nineteenth century grew to become an important industrial centre on the edge of the Ruhr District. His father, also called Carl, was a businessman: his grandfather had worked as a miner. The family was not particularly wealthy.

Klönne underwent a training in banking in Cologne, after which he worked in a succession of banks in Cologne, Berlin, Amsterdam, London and, briefly, in Russia. By 1875 he was director of the Westphalia Bank in Bielefeld. The bank was in a troubled state partly on account of the recession which hit Europe in the early 1870s, triggered initially by a disruption following the Franco-Prussian War and a collapse in farm prices. Helped by his friend and colleague, Albert Müller (who later became a director at the Essener Credit-Anstalt Bank), and applying sound judgement combined with due prudence, Klönne was able to restore the Bielfeld bank to robust health within a few years, enhancing his own reputation in the process.

== Career ==
In 1879 he joined the board of the Cologne based Schaaffhausen'scher Bank. The Schaaffhausen'scher Bank was also suffering from the after effects of the 1870s recession. With Klönne on the board the bank was restored to health. His own focus was on financing industrial investment: during his time on the board the Schaaffhausen'scher made a significant contribution to the booming regional economy during the final decades of the nineteenth century. A particularly important client, and one with whom he would retain and build his friendship long after he had moved on from the Schaaffhausen'scher Bank, was August Thyssen. Klönne nevertheless identified a continuing mismatch between the level of the investment opportunities available in the Rhineland/Ruhr region, and the amount of investment capital that the banks locally were able to provide. He therefore urged his fellow board members to open a branch in Berlin which was developing rapidly as an international financial centre. The new branch opened in 1890 and for a year Klönne relocated to Berlin in order to set it up and run it. The bank's capital base increased dramatically, reaching 100 Million Marks in 1899. At this point Klönne believed that in order to grow further the bank should relocate its headquarters to Berlin. His fellow directors believed they were running a regional bank, however, and were not persuaded of the desirability of moving to Berlin. Relations became more strained and eventually it was Klönne who resigned from the board of the Schaaffhausen'scher Bank.

In 1900 Klönne joined the board of Deutsche Bank, remaining a member till 1914, although towards the end he became increasingly deaf. During this period he was instrumental in fostering closer ties with the Essener Credit-Anstalt Bank in which Deutsche Bank took a small stake in 1903 (and eventually, in 1925, took over completely). His colleague from his time in Bielefeld during the 1870s, Albert Müller, had become a director with the Essen bank and now, at Klönne's instigation, in 1901 became in addition a board member with Deutsche Bank, increasing board-level links between the two institutions. At Deutsche Bank he brought a new approach to bank lending, which he had pioneered more than twenty years earlier at the Westphalia Bank. Instead of subscribing for shares in new businesses and staying with them as they grew, there was a move to a less hands-on partnership with investee companies, investing in company bonds while (under most circumstances) leaving the companies to be managed by their managers. During a period of continuing rapid growth in the manufacturing and mining sectors, the overall level of bank lending in Germany continued to surge, the new approach enabled the bank to lend to a wider range of companies. A particular growth area involved heavy engineering and electrical firms. It had been Georg von Siemens, himself a founding director of Deutsche Bank, who had choreographed Klönne's own accession to that company, and the continuing friendship with August Thyssen was also important as a business relationship. Other important clients among the growing industrial conglomerates locally included Rheinisch-Westfälisches Elektrizitätswerk AG, Gelsenkirchener Bergwerks (mining company) -AG and the Deutsch-Luxemburgische Bergwerks- und Hütten-AG.

Carl Klönne resigned from Deutsche Bank on health grounds in 1914, his place on the executive board being taken over by Oscar Schlitter. Schlitter had already worked closely with Klönne since first joining the Deutsche Bank board in 1906, and their cooperation had continued between 1908 and 1912 when Schlitter had switched to become General Director of the Bergisch-Märkische Bank, which had been merged into Deutsche Bank in 1912.

== Death ==
Carl Klönne died in Berlin during the summer of 1915.
