= Reichs-Kredit-Gesellschaft =

Former German bank

Reichs-Kredit-Gesellschaft (RKG)
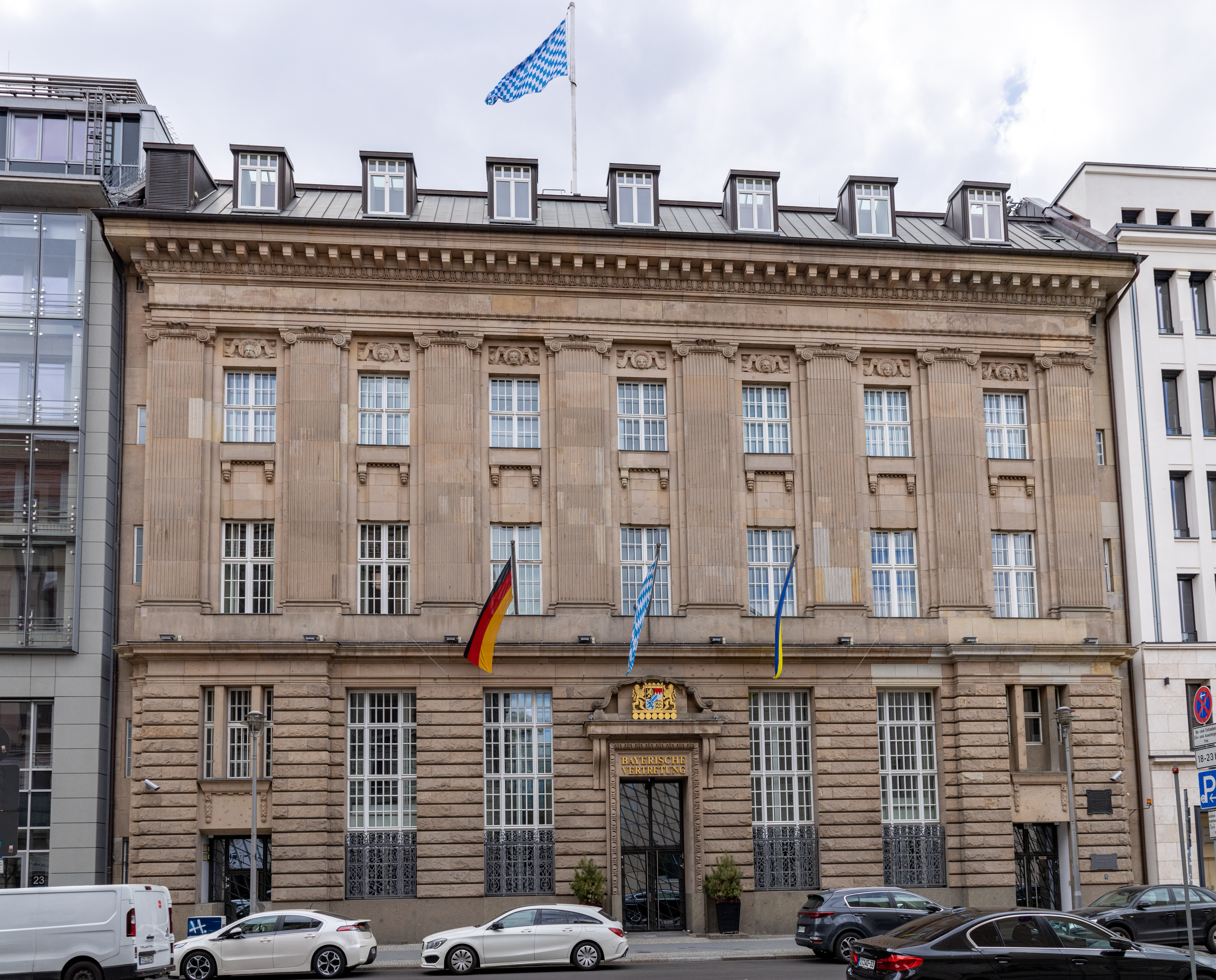
- Building at Behrensstrasse 21–22 in Berlin, former head office of the RKG, erected 1896 as Berlin branch of the A. Schaaffhausen'scher Bankverein; lately the Berlin representative office of Bavaria
- Type: State-owned bank
- Industry: Financial services
- Founded: 1923
- Founder: VIAG (on behalf of German government)
- Defunct: 1945
- Fate: Closed due to Soviet occupation
- Headquarters: Berlin, Germany
- Area served: Germany
- Key people: Samuel Ritscher (General Manager)
- Products: Banking services, industrial and commercial credit, securities, asset management, trade finance
- Owner: German government

The Reichs-Kredit-Gesellschaft (RKG, lit. 'Credit Company of the Reich') was a significant state-owned German bank, located in Berlin.

== History ==
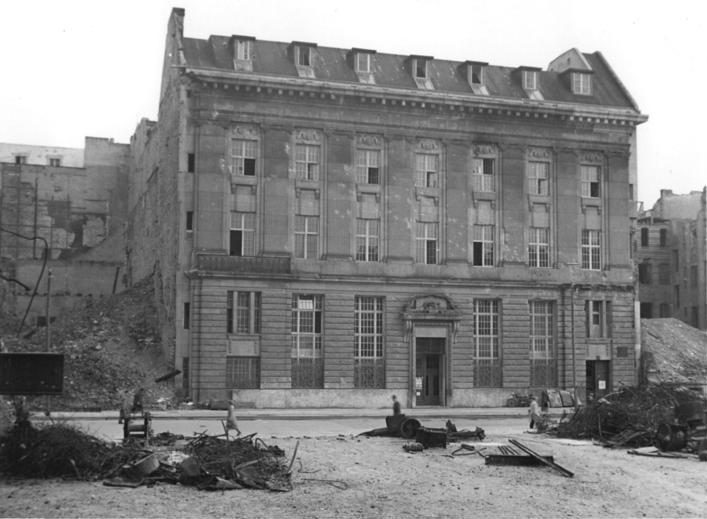
The former RKG building in 1950

The RKG originated in the war economy of Germany during World War I. In 1917, the Reich Treasury established a Statistical Office for War Companies (German: Statistisches Büro für Kriegsgesellschaften) for the purpose of financing companies that had been set up to support the war effort to balance the surplus and need for money in the war societies. After the war's end, the corresponding assets and liabilities were transferred to a "credit and control entity" (German: Reichs-Kredit- und Kontrollstelle GmbH), a limited-liability company owned by the German government.

On 7 March 1923, the government-owned VIAG company founded the Reichs-Kredit-Gesellschaft mbH (private limited company) to take over the Reichs-Kredit- und Kontrollstelle GmbH, and transformed it the next year into a joint-stock company, with Samuel Ritscher as its general manager. The RKG was principally active in the areas of industrial and commercial credit, securities, asset management, and trade finance.

By 1930, the RKG had become Germany's fifth-largest joint-stock bank by total deposits with 619 million Reichsmarks, behind Deutsche Bank & Disconto-Gesellschaft (4.8 billion), Danat-Bank (2.4 billion), Dresdner Bank (2.3 billion), and Commerz- und Privatbank (1.5 billion). This was achieved despite having no branches outside of Berlin.

The existence of the RKG came to an abrupt end in 1945, as the Soviet occupation forces closed it and appropriated its assets, as with all banks in their occupation zone. A number of former RKG employees subsequently took leadership roles at the Frankfurter Bank.

== See also ==
- Berliner Handels-Gesellschaft
- List of banks in Germany
