= Gustav von Mevissen =

German businessman and politician

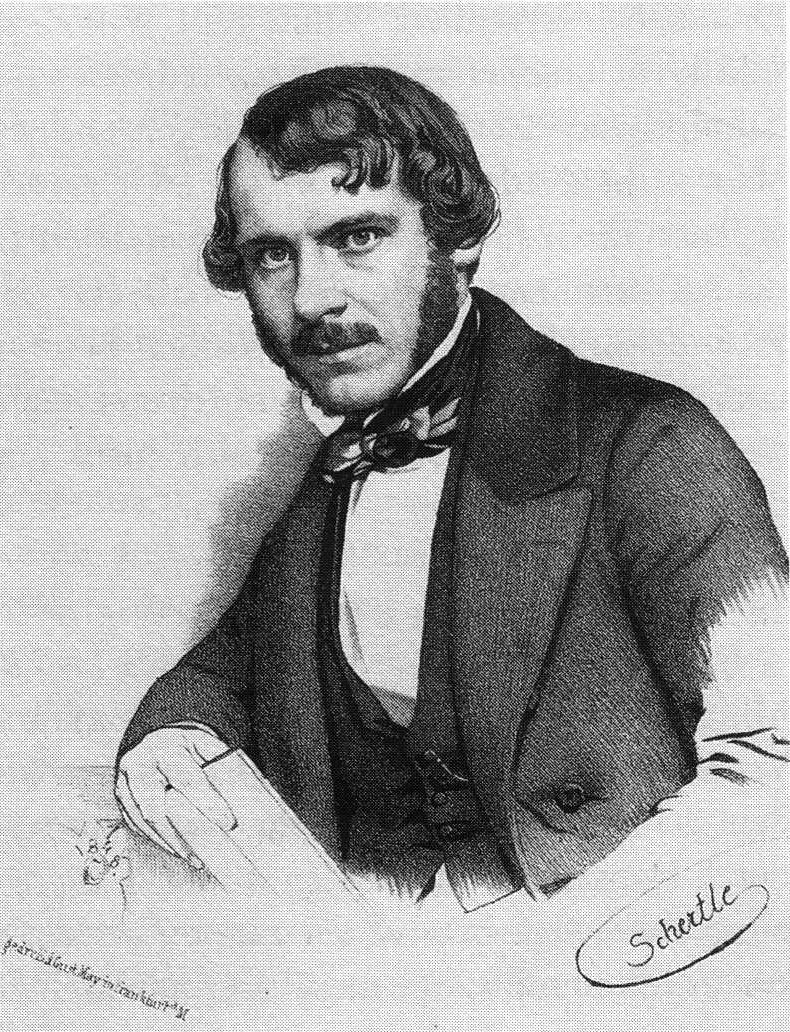
Mevissen in 1848.

Gustav Mevissen, after 1884 known as Gustav von Mevissen, (20 May 1815 – 13 August 1899), was a German businessman and politician.

Mevissen was born in Dülken, Rhine Province to a Catholic merchant family. He started by investing in textile industry and later in railway construction and heavy industry. He founded numerous banks, including the Darmstädter Bank, and insurance companies. He is considered a pioneer of the German credit and insurance industry.

As a politician he was a leading representative of Rhineland liberalism and he was a member of the Provincial Assembly of the Rhine Province, the Vereinigter Landtag, the Frankfurt Parliament. From 1866 he was a member of the Prussian House of Lords. He died in Bad Godesberg.

In 1879, on the golden wedding anniversary of the Kaiser, Mevissen set aside railway shares worth approximately 200,000 marks to establish a commercial college in Cologne.

== See also ==
- A. Schaaffhausen'scher Bankverein

== Bibliography ==
- Quarg, Gunter (1999). Gustav von Mevissen (1815-1899) und seine Bibliothek: Katalog der Ausstellung in der Universitäts- und Stadtbibliothek Köln (in German). Univ.-u.-Stadtbibl. ISBN 978-3-931596-13-2.
- Mevissen, Gustav von (1906-12-31). Hansen, Joseph (ed.). Gustav von Mevissen Band 1. De Gruyter. doi:10.1515/9783111449593. ISBN 978-3-11-144959-3.
