= Darmstädter Bank =

Former German bank

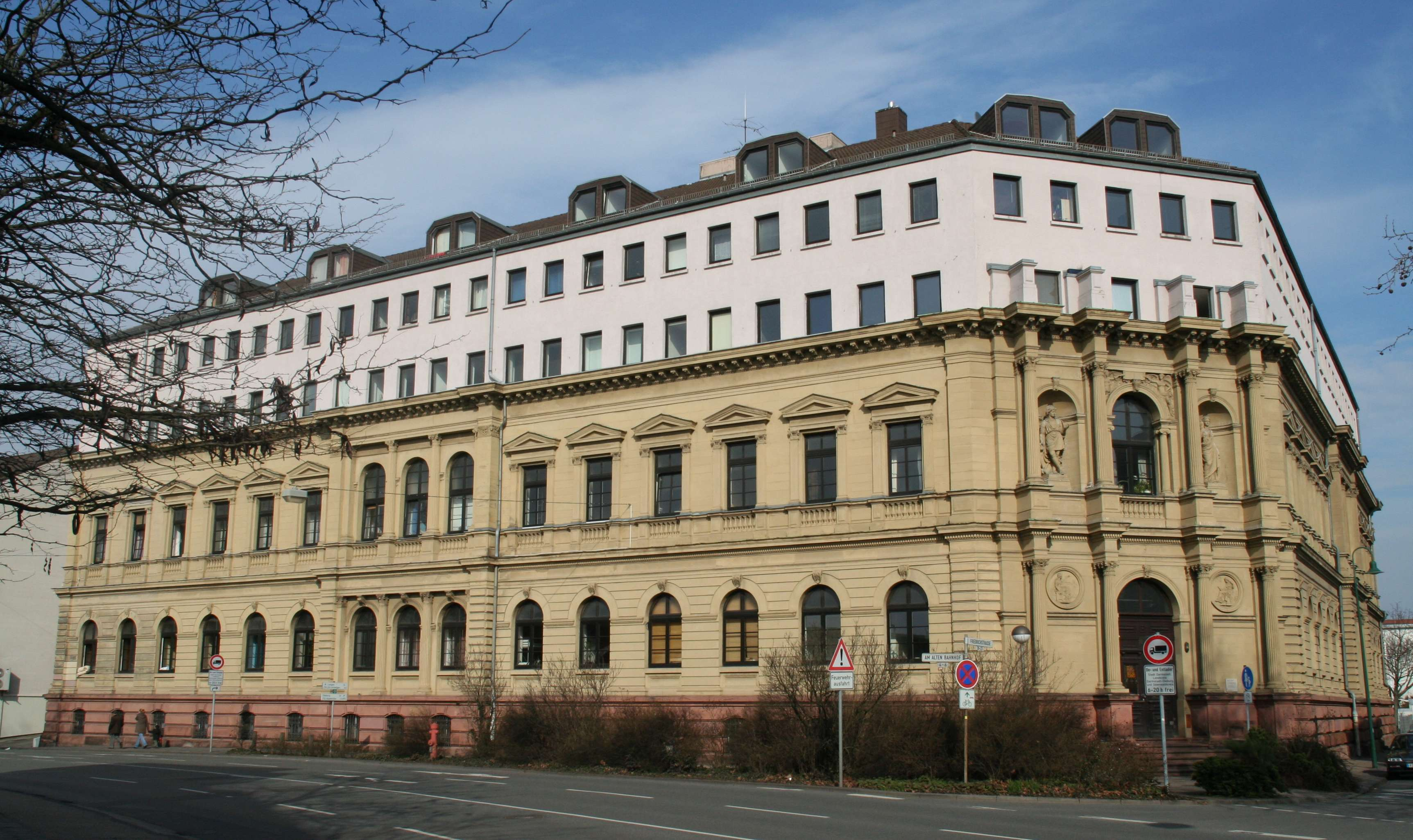
Former main building of the Darmstädter Bank in Darmstadt, erected 1873–1875 on a design by architect Philipp Johann Berdellé, used by the bank until 1932

The Bank für Handel und Industrie in Darmstadt, often referred to as Darmstädter Bank, was a significant joint-stock bank in Germany, active from 1853 until its merger with Nationalbank für Deutschland to form Danat-Bank in 1922.

== Overview ==
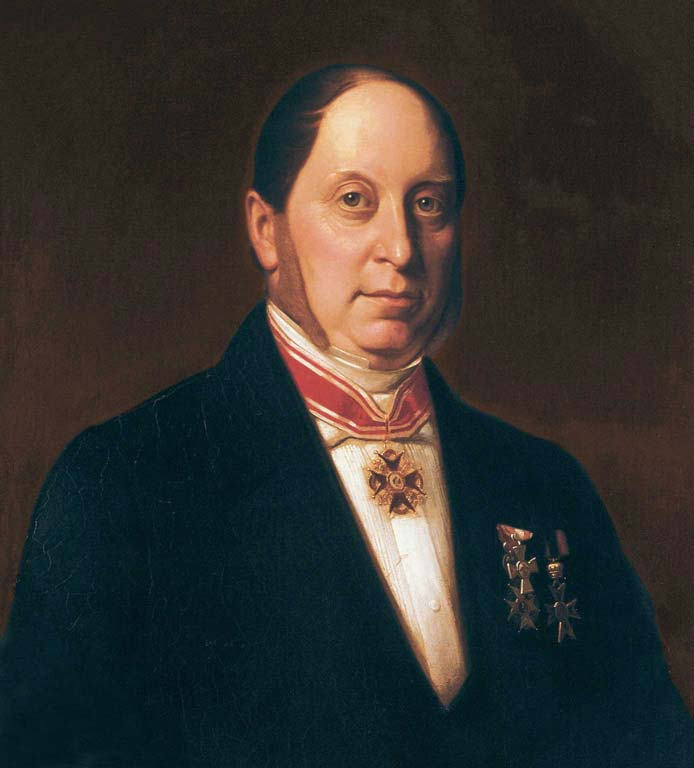
Abraham Oppenheim (1804–1878) was instrumental in the creation of the Darmstädter Bank

The Bank für Handel und Industrie was founded by Cologne bankers Wilhelm Ludwig Deichmann, Gustav Mevissen, Abraham Oppenheim and Victor Wendelstadt. It was established with a capital of 25 million guilders and modelled after the French bank Crédit Mobilier, in whose creation in 1852 Oppenheim had been involved and from which it secured backing for the new venture. The Darmstädter Bank received its banking concession on 2 April 1853, and started operations shortly afterwards. It was thus the second universal bank in Germany founded as a joint-stock company (Aktiengesellschaft), after the A. Schaaffhausen'scher Bankverein in 1848. (The Disconto-Gesellschaft had been established in Berlin in 1851, but only became a joint-stock company in 1856.) The choice of Darmstadt was motivated by regulatory arbitrage, since no concession for a joint-stock bank could be obtained in either the Free City of Frankfurt or the Kingdom of Prussia, while the Grand Duchy of Hesse allowed for easier arrangements. Despite the inspiration from Crédit Mobilier, the model for the new bank's statutory documents was the A. Schaaffhausen'scher Bankverein, restructured five years earlier with the critical involvement of Deichmann, Mevissen and Wendelstadt.

The bank soon opened an agency in Frankfurt in 1854 (transformed into a branch in 1864), and branches and affiliates in Berlin, Breslau, Heilbronn, Leipzig, Mainz, and Mannheim as well as New York City in the 1850s and in Hamburg, Stuttgart and Vienna in the 1860s.

In 1871, the Darmstädter Bank led the creation of Amsterdamsche Bank in the Netherlands, and partnered with Anglo-Austrian Bank and Wiener Bankverein to create the Austro-Ottomanische Bank, a joint-stock bank in Constantinople; but that venture soon faltered and was acquired by the Imperial Ottoman Bank in 1874.

In 1873, the bank moved its headquarters to Berlin, having opened a branch there in 1871, but remained colloquially referred to as the Darmstädter Bank. It was one of the four so-called "D-Banks" that dominated German commercial banking at the time (all of which had names starting with a D), together with Deutsche Bank, Dresdner Bank, and Disconto-Gesellschaft. In 1889, it participated in the creation of the Deutsch-Asiatische Bank in Shanghai, and in 1898, in that of the Banque Internationale de Bruxelles. Around 1900 it became a shareholder of Belgium-based Crédit Anversois. Further German branches were opened in Stettin (1900), Hanover (1901), Düsseldorf, Munich, and Nuremberg (1910).

By end-1908, the Darmstädter Bank was the fourth-largest German joint-stock bank by total deposits, with a total of 109 million Marks, behind Deutsche Bank (489 million), Dresdner Bank (225 million), and Disconto-Gesellschaft (219 million). In 1913, it took over the Breslauer Disconto-Bank based in Breslau. Between 1918 and 1921, it opened many more branches across Germany, and acquired majority ownership of Vienna-based Mercurbank, before merging with the Nationalbank für Deutschland in 1922.

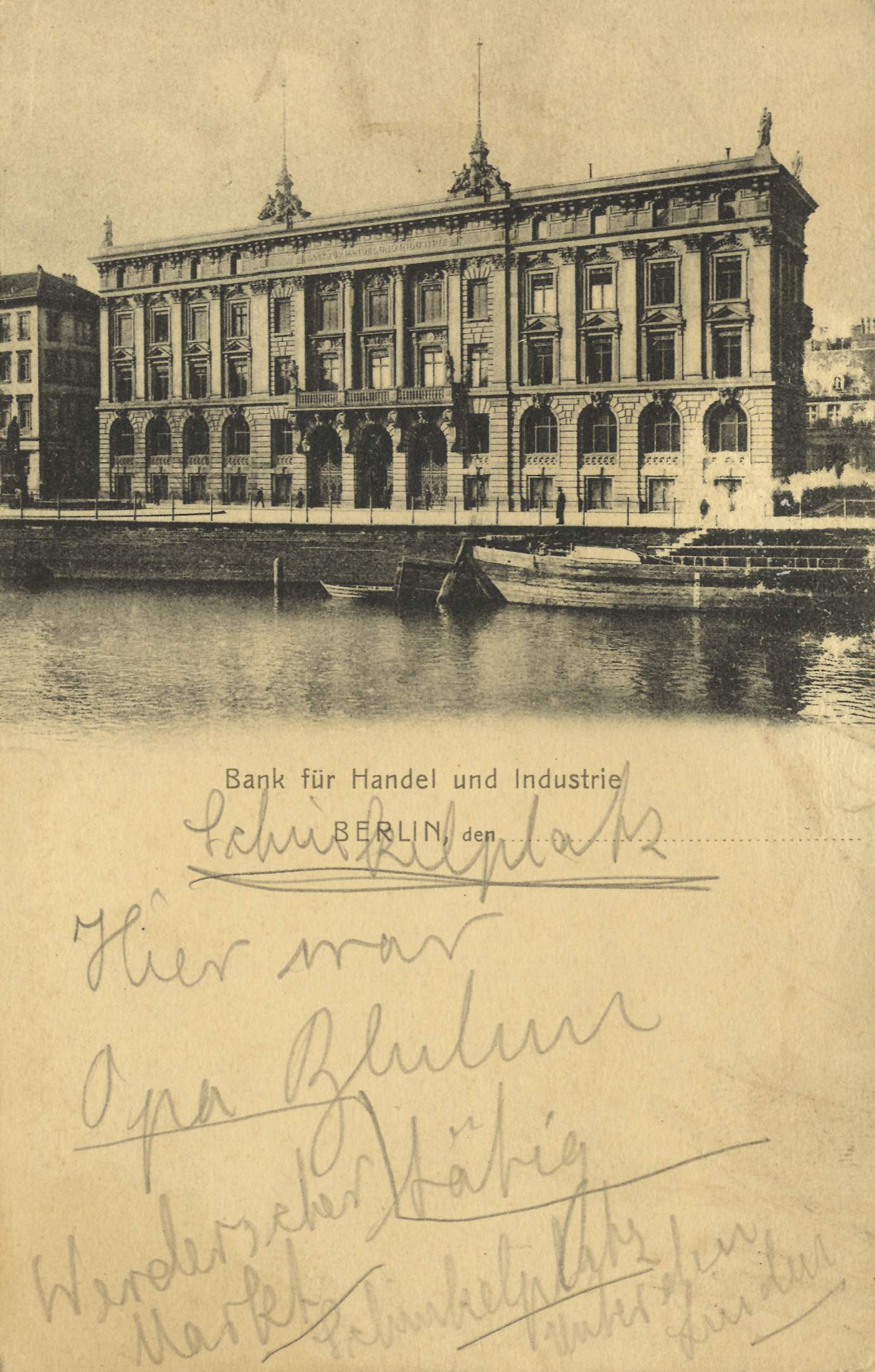
Postcard of the head office of the Darmstädter Bank in Berlin, Schinkelplatz 1–4, ca. 1900

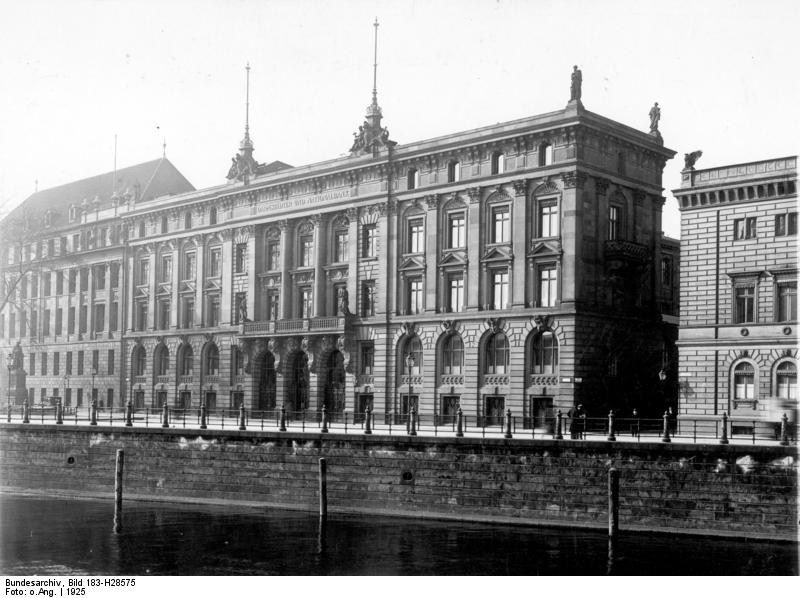
The same building in 1925, showing southward expansion (left); the building was destroyed during World War II

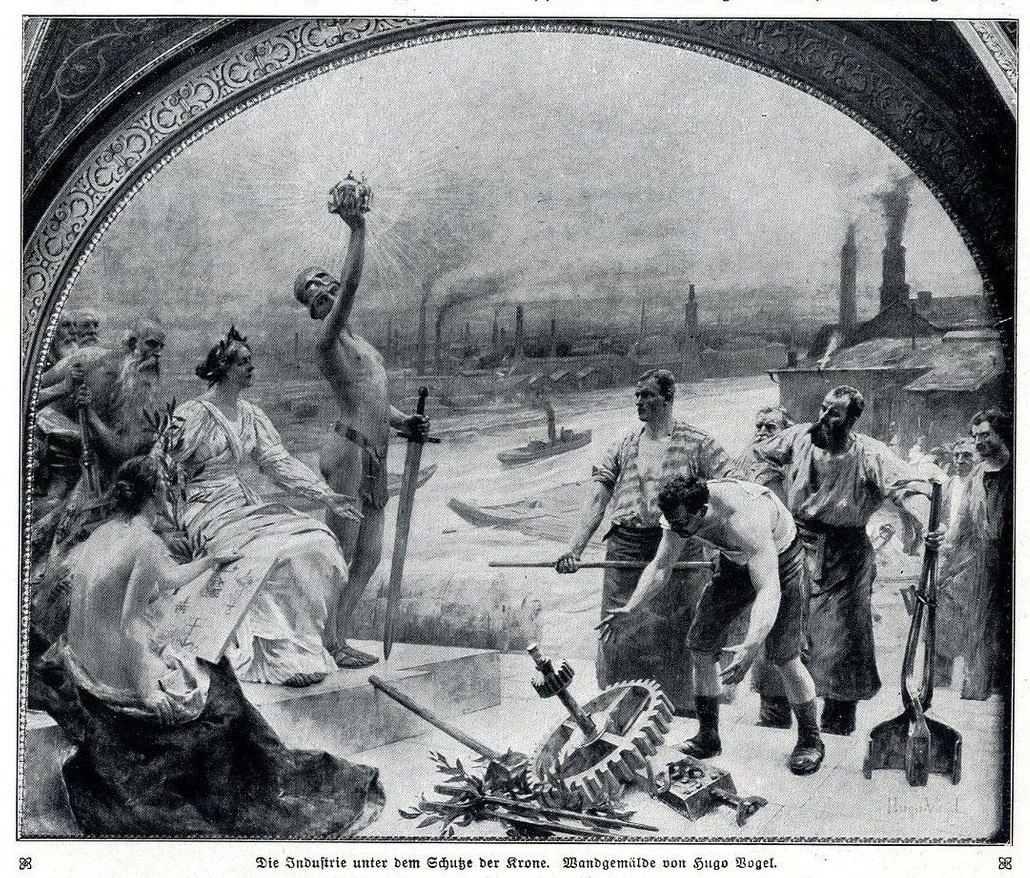
Industry under the protection of the [German] Crown (1894), mural painting by Hugo Vogel in the Berlin head office (destroyed during World War II)

== See also ==
- A. Schaaffhausen'scher Bankverein
- Disconto-Gesellschaft
- List of banks in Germany
