= Oddo BHF =

Franco-German financial services group

Coordinates: 50.116258°N 8.66846°E

ODDO BHF
- Native name: ODDO BHF SCA
- Industry: Financial services
- Founded: 1967
- Headquarters: Paris, France
- Key people: Philippe Oddo (managing partner)
- AUM: ~€128 billion
- Website: www.oddo-bhf.com

ODDO BHF is a financial services group headquartered in Paris, France. It was created in 1967 as Oddo & Cie, a French family-owned stockbroker. In 2016, Oddo purchased BHF Bank, a German bank specialising in Mittelstand companies, and in 2017 renamed itself ODDO BHF.

ODDO BHF operates mainly in private banking, asset management, and investment banking.

== History ==
Oddo & Cie was founded in 1967 by Bernard Oddo, a stockbroker in Marseille.

In 1987, Philippe Oddo became the managing partner. In 1988, insurer AGF became a minority shareholder. In 1991, Oddo & Cie opened Oddo DV, its subsidiary in Madrid.

In 1997, the company acquired Delahaye Finance, a private management specialist firm. In 1998, it expanded to the United States through Oddo Securities Corporation in New York City. In the same year, Oddo Options started operations, bringing under a single firm options trading activities previously divided between Paris, Madrid, and Milan. In 1999, Oddo Asset Management was created.

In 2000, Oddo acquired Pinatton, a company specialized in intermediation, corporate finance, and private banking. In 2003, it acquired NFMDA (private management) and in 2004, the European credit intermediation activities of Crédit Lyonnais. In 2005, Oddo & Cie purchased Cyril Finance Asset Management, and KilbraXE in 2007.

In 2006, the Group launched its new branch Oddo Metals for commodities trading. In 2007, it was granted a French banking license.

Concurrently with these acquisitions, Oddo built a number of partnerships, including Génération Vie, a joint venture with Allianz in 2003, and La Banque Postale Private Banking, a partnership with La Banque Postale in 2007 which expanded Oddo's private clientele. In 2009, Oddo also established its own research institute in Tunis.

In 2010, Oddo signed a commercial agreement with the securities services arm of Société Générale to develop a joint offering of securities services. That same year, it acquired Banque d'Orsay from Westdeutsche Landesbank AG, and Banque Robeco from Robeco. It also rose to 65 percent equity ownership in Patrimoine Consultant. It also acquired German market activities from Close Brothers Group in 2014, which it subsequently renamed ODDO SEYDLER BANK AG then ODDO BHF Corporates & Markets AG; and asset manager Meriten IM from BNY Mellon in 2015.

In 2016, Oddo & Cie acquired BHF Bank, and rebranded to ODDO BHF the following year.

== See also ==
- List of banks in the euro area
- List of banks in France
