= Danat-Bank =

Former German bank

Coordinates: 49.8739°N 8.6419°E

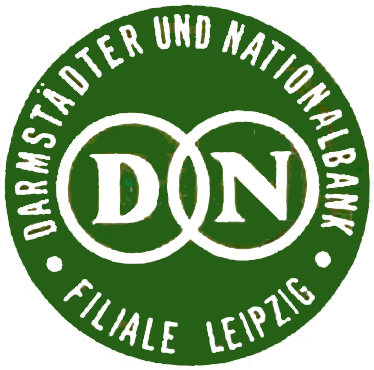

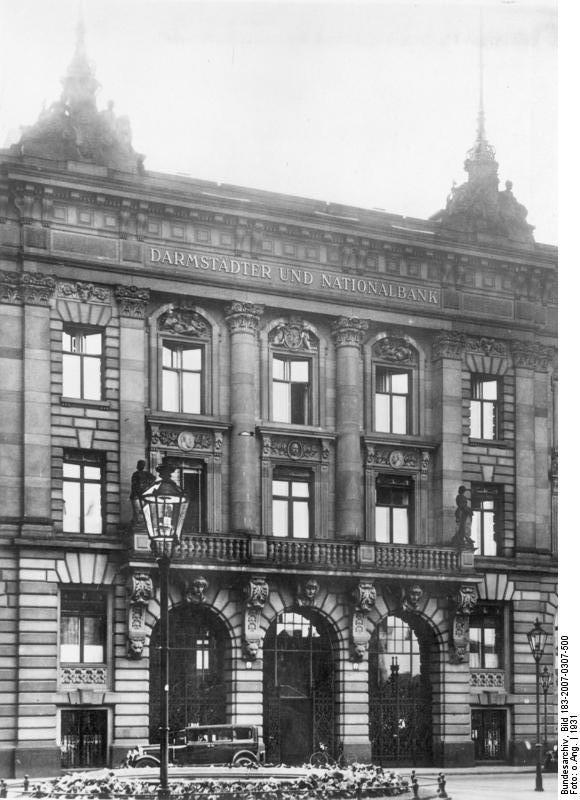
- Head office at Schinkelplatz 1–4 in Berlin, photographed in 1931 (destroyed in World War II)
- Type: Aktiengesellschaft
- Industry: Banking
- Predecessor: Bank für Handel und Industrie
- Founded: 1922
- Defunct: 1931
- Successor: Dresdner Bank
- Headquarters: Darmstadt

The Darmstädter und Nationalbank, in shorthand Danat-Bank or Danatbank, was a large German joint-stock bank. It was formed in 1922 from the merger of the Bank für Handel und Industrie (Darmstadt), known as Darmstädter Bank, and the Nationalbank für Deutschland. Its failure in July 1931 was a significant episode of the European banking crisis of 1931.

== Overview ==
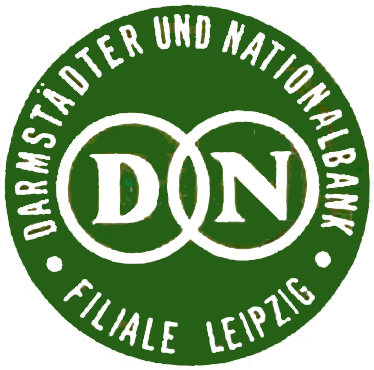
Seal of Danat-Bank's branch in Leipzig

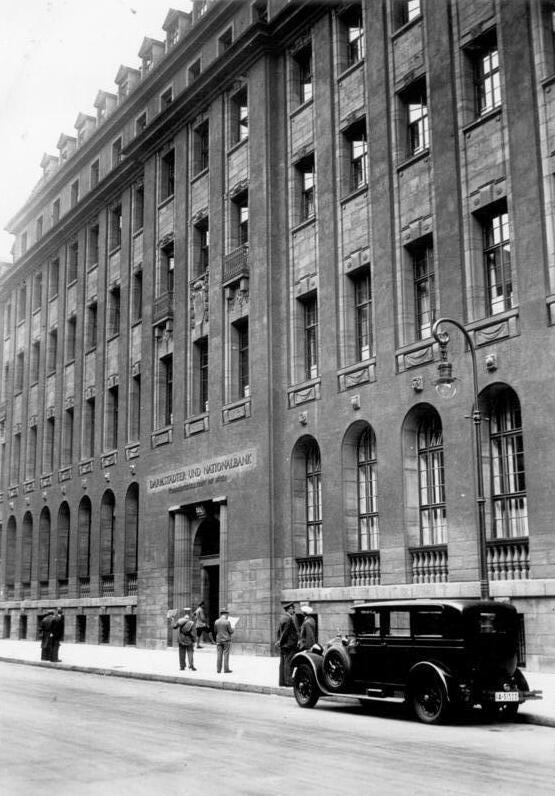
Danat-Bank building at Behrenstrasse 5 in 1931

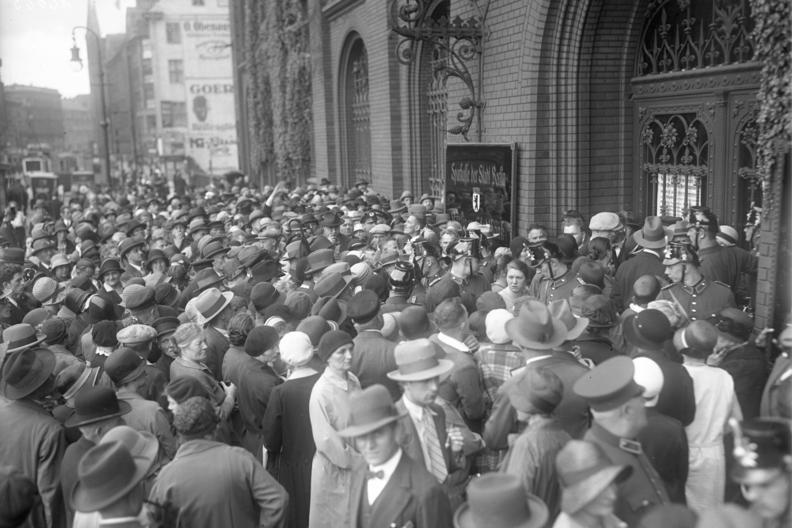
Rush of savers from the Sparkasse of Berlin at Mühlendamm after the collapse of the Danatbank on 13 July 1931

In 1920/1921, the Darmstädter Bank für Handel und Industrie and the Nationalbank für Deutschland formed the bank union Darmstädter-Nationalbank Berlin. Both banks assumed a joint guarantee of capital and reserves of over 1 billion marks. The merger was fully completed in 1922, resulting in one of the largest commercial banks in Germany.

By 1930, Danat-Bank had become Germany's second-largest joint-stock bank, with total deposits of 2.4 billion Reichsmarks ahead of Dresdner Bank (2.3 billion), Commerz- und Privatbank (1.5 billion), Reichs-Kredit-Gesellschaft (619 million), and Berliner Handels-Gesellschaft (412 million), and only behind Deutsche Bank & Disconto-Gesellschaft (4.8 billion). In the European banking crisis of 1931, however, Danat-Bank suffered a run which started around 17 June due to rumours of the insolvency of the Norddeutsche Wollkämmerei & Kammgarnspinnerei (North German Wool and Worsted Yarn Spinning Works), finally going bankrupt on 13 July 1931. It was thus one of the most prominent victims of deflation in Germany during the Great Depression. Hjalmar Schacht recalls in his memoirs that one of the causes of the crack was that the Danat had little liquidity but lots of German stock; this was due to the activity of Goldschmidt, who bought equity of German firms to capture them as clients and organise mergers.

The collapse of Danatbank triggered a loss of confidence in the German banking system, and let loose a wave of withdrawals from all other banks beginning the German Banking Crisis. In reaction, the government announced a Bank Holiday starting on 13 July, imposed further capital controls and forced the merger of Danatbank with Dresdner Bank.

== Key individuals ==
Well-known bankers of the Danat-Bank and its predecessors are (in alphabetical order):

- Siegmund Bodenheimer, Manager of Darmstädter Bank 1910–1922, shareholder 1922–1931
- Bernhard Dernburg, Manager of Darmstädter Bank 1901–1906
- Jakob Goldschmidt, Shareholder Nationalbank 1918-1922; Shareholder 1922–1931
- Johannes Kaempf, Branch director of the Bank für Handel und Industrie in Berlin and Reichstags-President
- Hjalmar Schacht, Shareholder Nationalbank 1917-1922; Shareholder Danat-Bank 1922–1923
- Georg von Simson, Shareholder bis 1929
- Richard Witting, Director (1902–1910) and board member (1911–1922) of the Nationalbank, board member of Danat-Bank 1922-1923

== See also ==
- List of banks in Germany
