= Schmittmann =

Schmittmann is a German surname. Notable people with this name include:

- Beate Schmittmann, German-American physicist
- Benedikt Schmittmann (1872–1939), German social scientist
- Ella Schmittmann (1880–1970), German political activist
- Heinrich Schmittmann (1878–1956), German jurist, first president of the German Federal Fiscal Court
- Stefan Schmittmann (born 1956), German bank manager
