= Commerzbank =

European commercial bank

Commerzbank AG

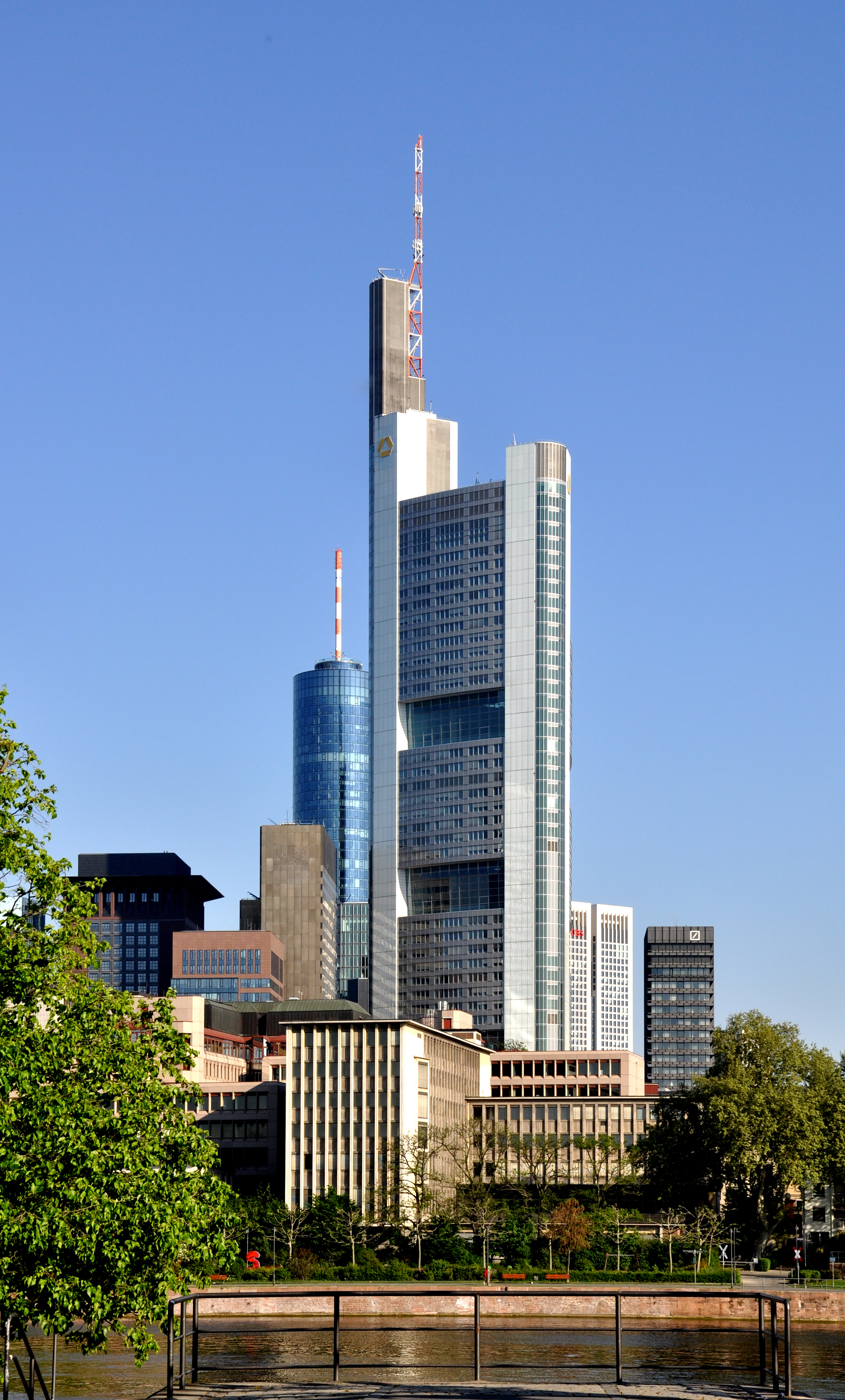
- Commerzbank Tower, the headquarters of Commerzbank in Innenstadt, Frankfurt
- Type: Public company
- Traded as: FWB: CBK; DAX
- ISIN: DE000CBK1001
- Industry: Financial services
- Founded: 26 February 1870; 156 years ago in Hamburg
- Founders: Theodor Wille et al.
- Headquarters: Commerzbank Tower, Frankfurt am Main, Germany
- Number of locations: 15 operational foreign branches and 27 representative offices in over 40 countries (2023)
- Area served: Worldwide
- Key people: Bettina Orlopp (chairwoman of the Board of Managing Directors); Jens Weidmann (chairman of the Supervisory Board)
- Products: Asset management; Banking; Commodities; Credit cards; Equities trading; Insurance; Investment management; Mortgage loans; Private equity; Wealth management
- Brands: Comdirect Bank; mBank
- Revenue: ▲€11.1 billion (2024)
- Operating income: ▲€3.8 billion (2024)
- Net income: ▲€2.7 billion (2024)
- Total assets: €603.3 billion (Q1 2026)
- Total equity: ▼€33.829 billion (2025)
- Number of employees: 40,812 (2025)
- Capital ratio: 15.1% (2024)
- Rating: BBB (S&P Global); Baa2 (Moody's)
- Website: www.commerzbank.com

The Commerzbank Aktiengesellschaft (typically referred to as Commerzbank AG or simply Commerzbank [kɔˈmɛʁtsˌbaŋk]) is a European banking institution headquartered in Frankfurt am Main, Hesse, Germany. It offers services to private, business and corporate customers. The Commerzbank Group also includes the Polish subsidiary mBank.

One of the oldest banks in Germany, Commerzbank plays a significant role in the country's economy. It is the largest financier of German foreign trade, with strong ties to the German Mittelstand. It also has a presence in all major economic and financial centers worldwide. Since its establishment in 1870, Commerzbank has undergone several changes. In 1971, it became was the first German banking institution to open a branch in New York City.

Another milestone was the acquisition of Dresdner Bank in 2009. During the 2008 financial crisis, the Federal Republic of Germany became a major shareholder in the bank. The government remains a significant shareholder, though Commerzbank is listed on the DAX. In the 2020s, the bank returned to profitability, thanks in part to substantial cost reductions and changes to its business model.

== History ==
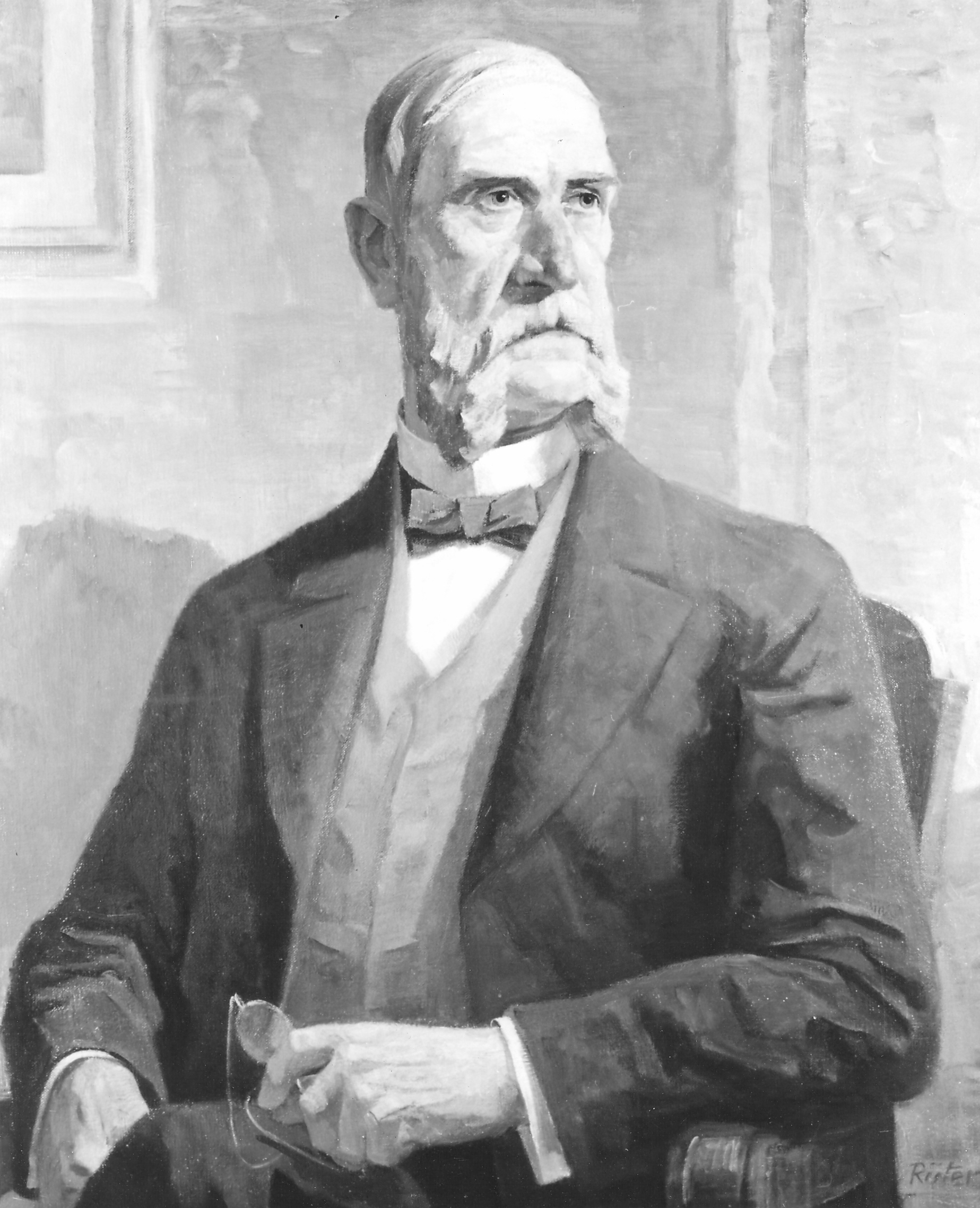
Theodor Wille, founder of Hamburger Commerz- und Diskonto-Bank

=== 1870–1918 ===
Commerz- und Diskonto-Bank was founded on 26 February 1870 by Theodor Wille, a merchant successful in South American trade, along with other trading houses and private bankers in Hamburg. The goal was to provide financial resources to Hamburg's trade and facilitate international commerce. The banking houses of Mendelssohn & Co., M. M. Warburg & Co., Hesse Newman, and B.H. Goldschmidt were among the founding investors. In 1873 the bank sponsored the creation of an affiliate in London, the London and Hanseatic Bank, of which it subscribed about half of the shares.

In 1881, Commerz- und Diskonto-Bank was among the founders of Nationalbank für Deutschland in Berlin, along with Anglo-Austrian Bank, Vienna's newly established Länderbank, the latter's affiliate Ungarische Landesbank, and Breslauer Disconto-Bank Friedenthal & Co. By 1891, it had become the largest bank in Hamburg by total lending. It participated in the rapid industrial and commercial development of the German Empire by providing trade finance, credit to small businesses, and investments in various industries that included shipping, electricity generation, mining, chemistry, and manufacturing. In 1897 it acquired Jacques Dreyfus & Co., a bank established 1868 as Dreyfus-Jeidels in Frankfurt, which also had a branch in Berlin. The bank shortened its name to Commerz- und Disconto-Bank in 1898.

In 1901 the bank joined the Reichsanleihe-Konsortium, a group of several dozen banks that placed loans for the German imperial government. In 1905 it acquired Berliner Bank (est. 1889 following the liquidation of the cooperative Berliner Handelsbank e.G., est. 1878) and from then until 1931 maintained two head offices: in Hamburg and Berlin, the latter at Behrensstrasse 46 / Charlottenstrasse 47. It acquired a number of regional and private banks, including B. Magnus (est. 1826 in Hanover) in 1897 and Altonaer Bank (Altona) in 1910.

During World War I, the London and Hanseatic Bank, the subsidiary established in 1873, was seized by the British authorities. Other German-owned banks were also seized. In 1917, Commerz began making acquisitions in Germany. By 1923 it had acquired 40 local banks.

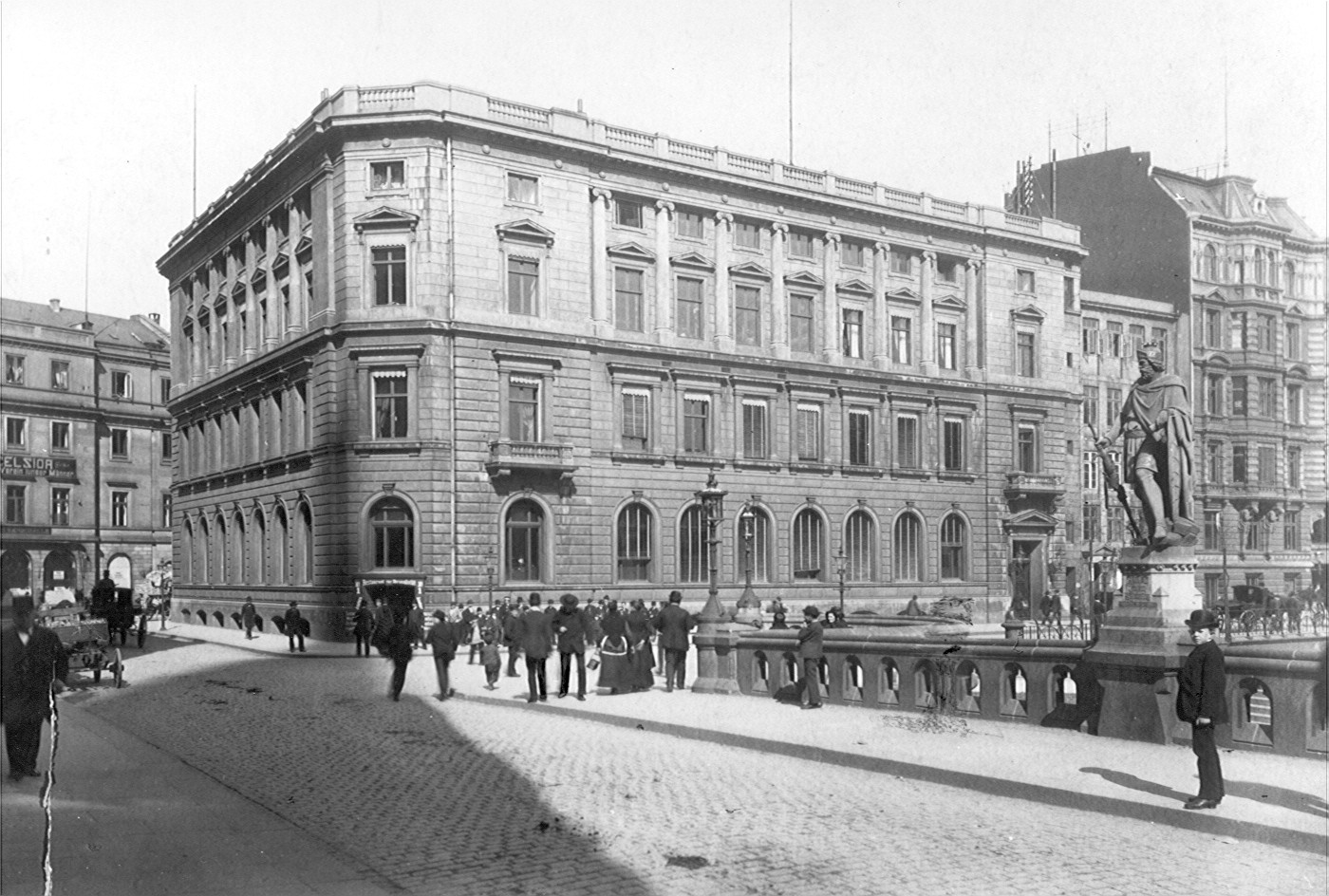
First head office building on the Nikolaifleet in Hamburg, completed in 1874 on a design by architect Martin Haller, photographed in 1886

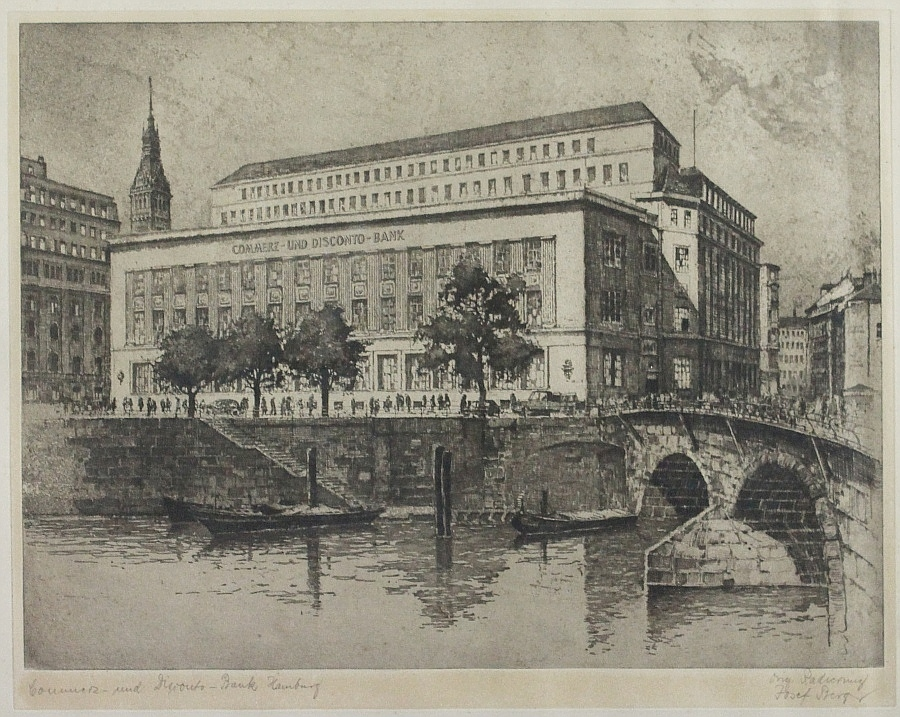
Undated engraving of the Hamburg head office following early-20C reconstruction

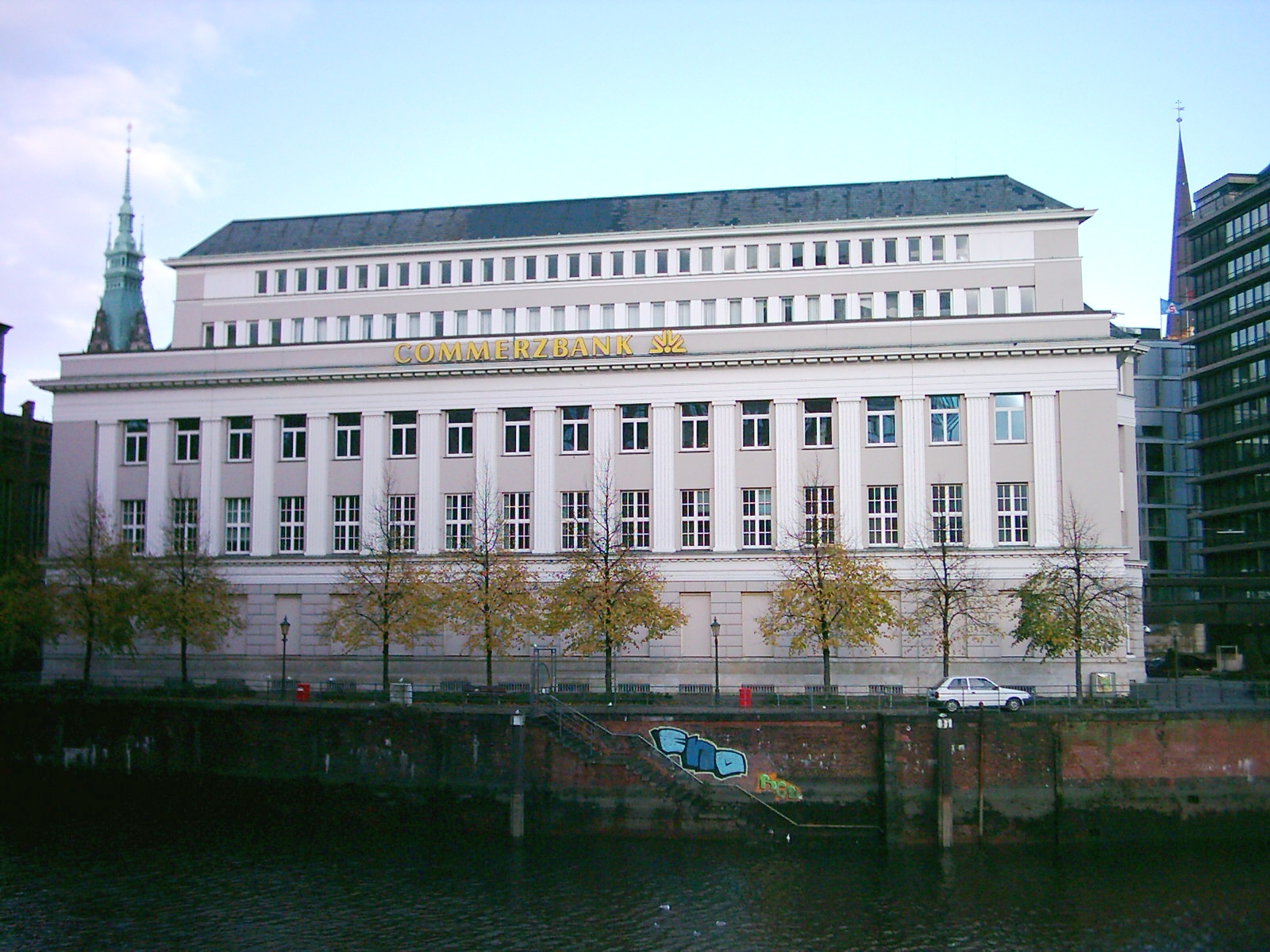
The same building in 2006

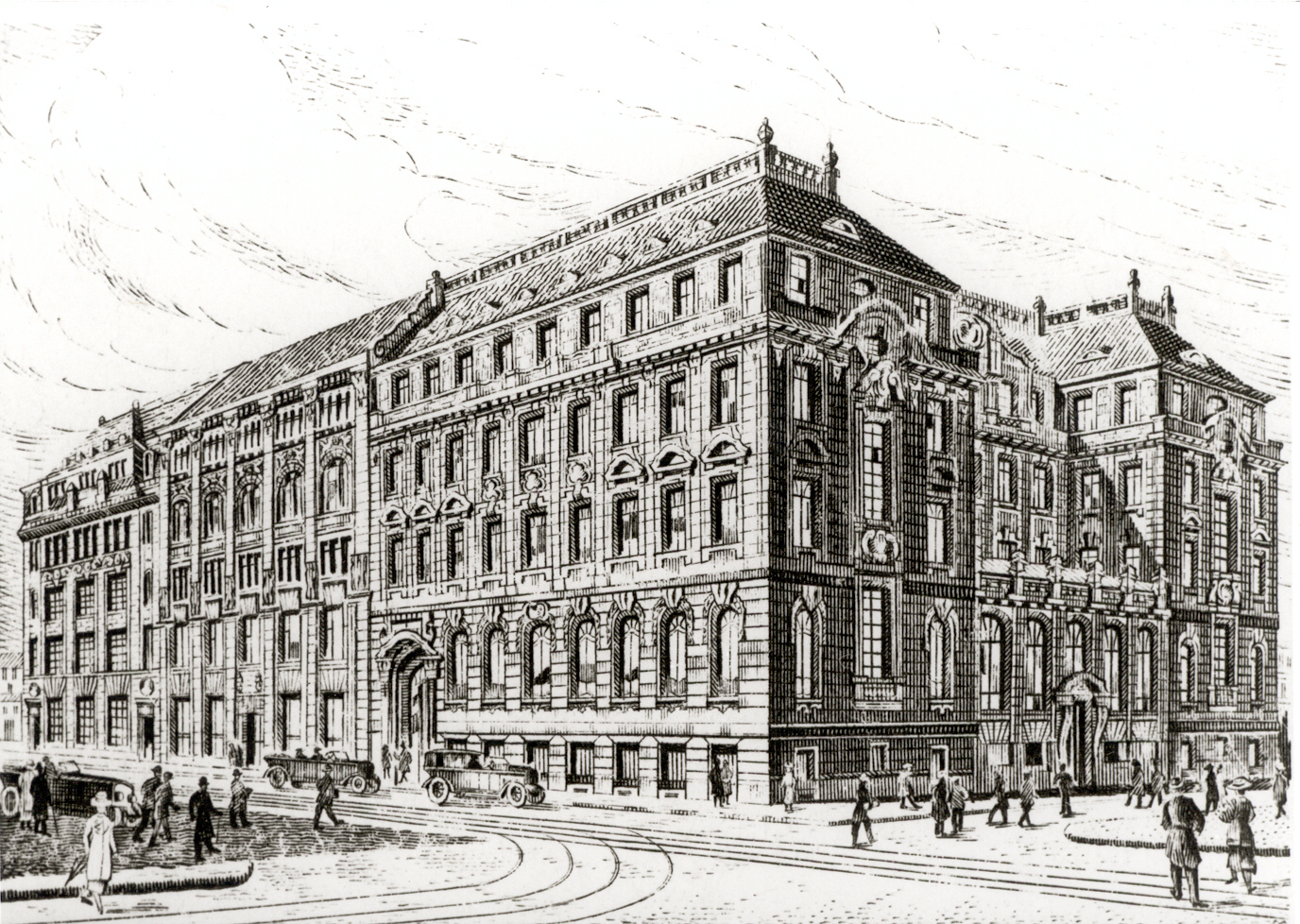
Former head office of Berliner Bank in Berlin, as remodeled in 1923 with addition of upper floors

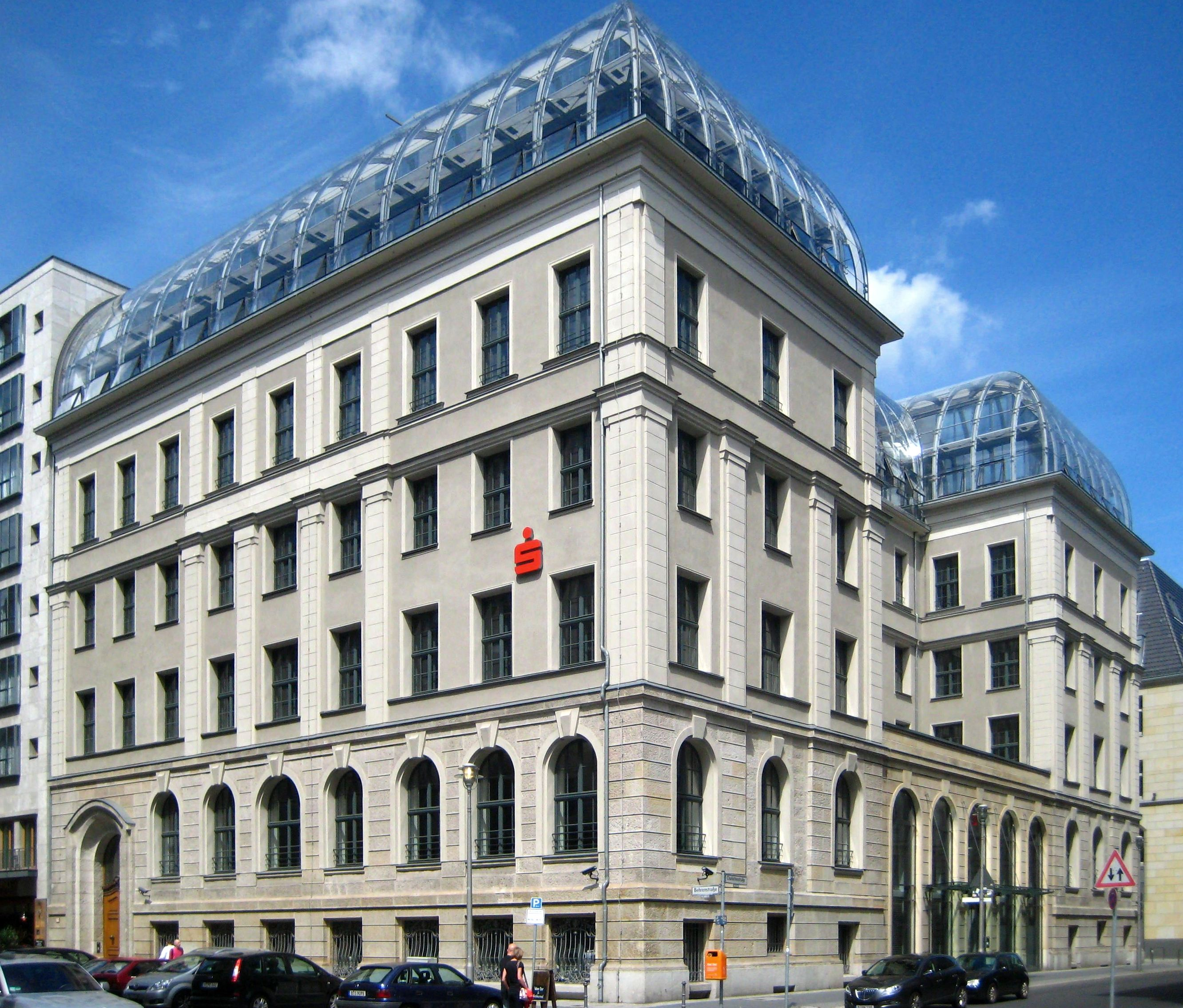
The same building in 2009, heavily remodeled and repurposed as head office of DSGV

=== 1918–1933 ===
In 1920 the bank acquired Mitteldeutsche Privat-Bank, a significant institution established 1856 in Magdeburg with a dense branch network in Saxony and Thuringia. The newly-enlarged group was renamed Commerz- und Privat-Bank AG. In 1923, it acquired 25% of Rigaer Internationale Bank in Riga, which was liquidated in 1933. In 1933, to cope with hyperinflation, it employed a total of 26,000 staff in 319 locations, the densest branch network among German banks; by the end of 1923, following the end of hyperinflation, the headcount fell to 10,200. In 1927, Commerzbank increased business in the US by establishing an office in New York City In 1928, co-founded General Mortgage and Credit Corporation, a long-term lender to small businesses, with Chase Securities Corp. and Halsey, Stuart & Co., . In 1929 it merged with the Mitteldeutsche Creditbank (established 1856 in Meiningen, relocated to Frankfurt in 1886), another transformative acquisition.

By 1930 Commerz- und Privatbank had deposits of 1.5 billion Reichsmarks and was Germany's fourth-largest joint-stock bank by total deposits, behind Deutsche Bank & Disconto-Gesellschaft (4.8 billion), Danat-Bank (2.4 billion), and Dresdner Bank (2.3 billion) and ahead of Reichs-Kredit-Gesellschaft (619 million) and Berliner Handels-Gesellschaft (412 million).

Following the European banking crisis of 1931 the bank consolidated all head office functions in Berlin, then in February 1932 it was prompted by the Reichsbank to absorb the distressed Barmer Bankverein (established 1867 in Wuppertal, relocated to Düsseldorf in 1924). As a consequence, the government held 71 percent of the merged entity's capital, mainly through the Reichsbank subsidiary Deutsche Golddiskontbank. In November 1932 the Commerz- und Privatbank chief executive Friedrich Reinhart and chairman Franz Heinrich Witthoefft were among the signatories of the Industrielleneingabe petition of business leaders that advised President Paul von Hindenburg to appoint Adolf Hitler as chancellor.

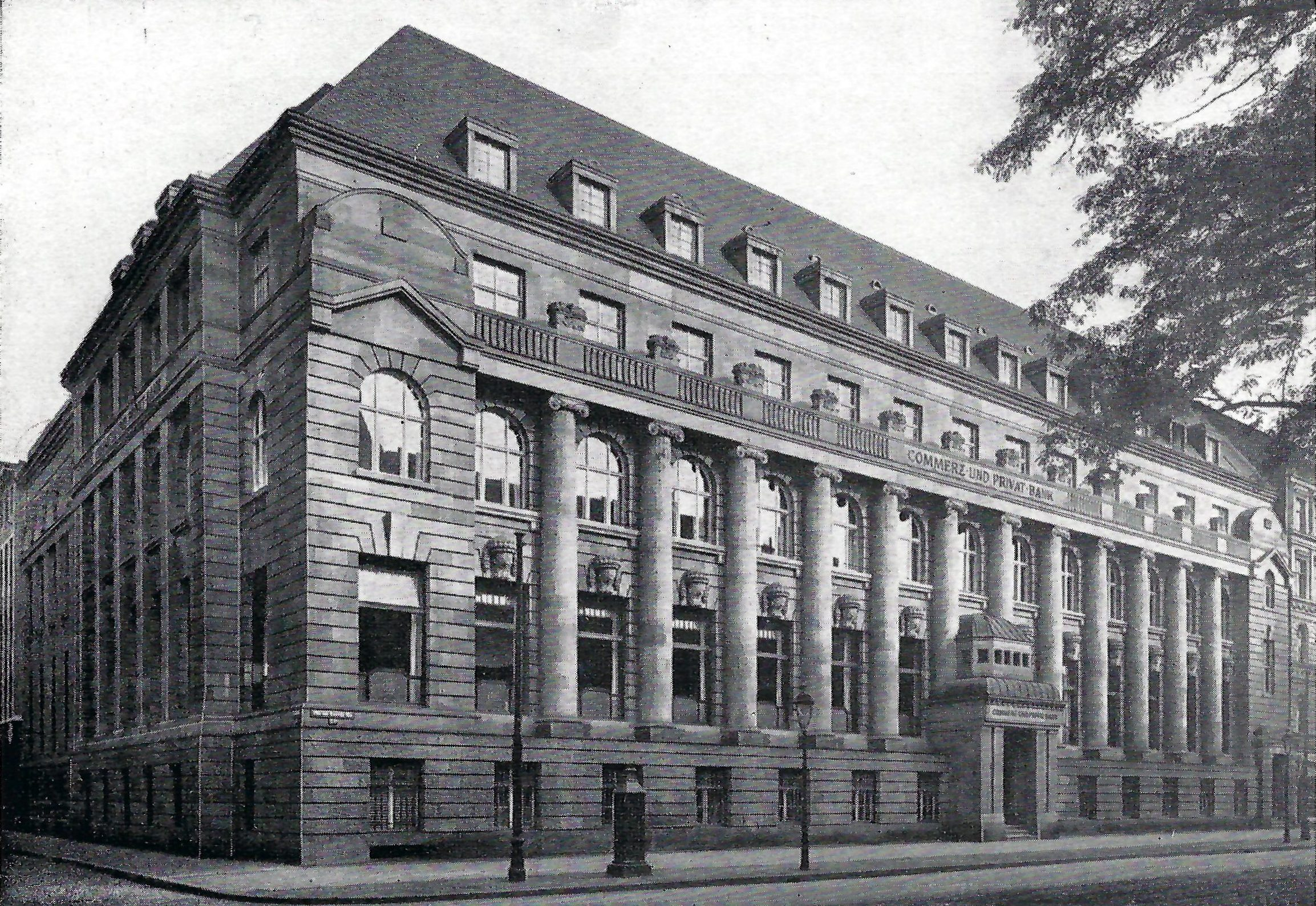
Former head office building of Mitteldeutsche Privat-Bank in Magdeburg, Commerz branch in the mid-1920s

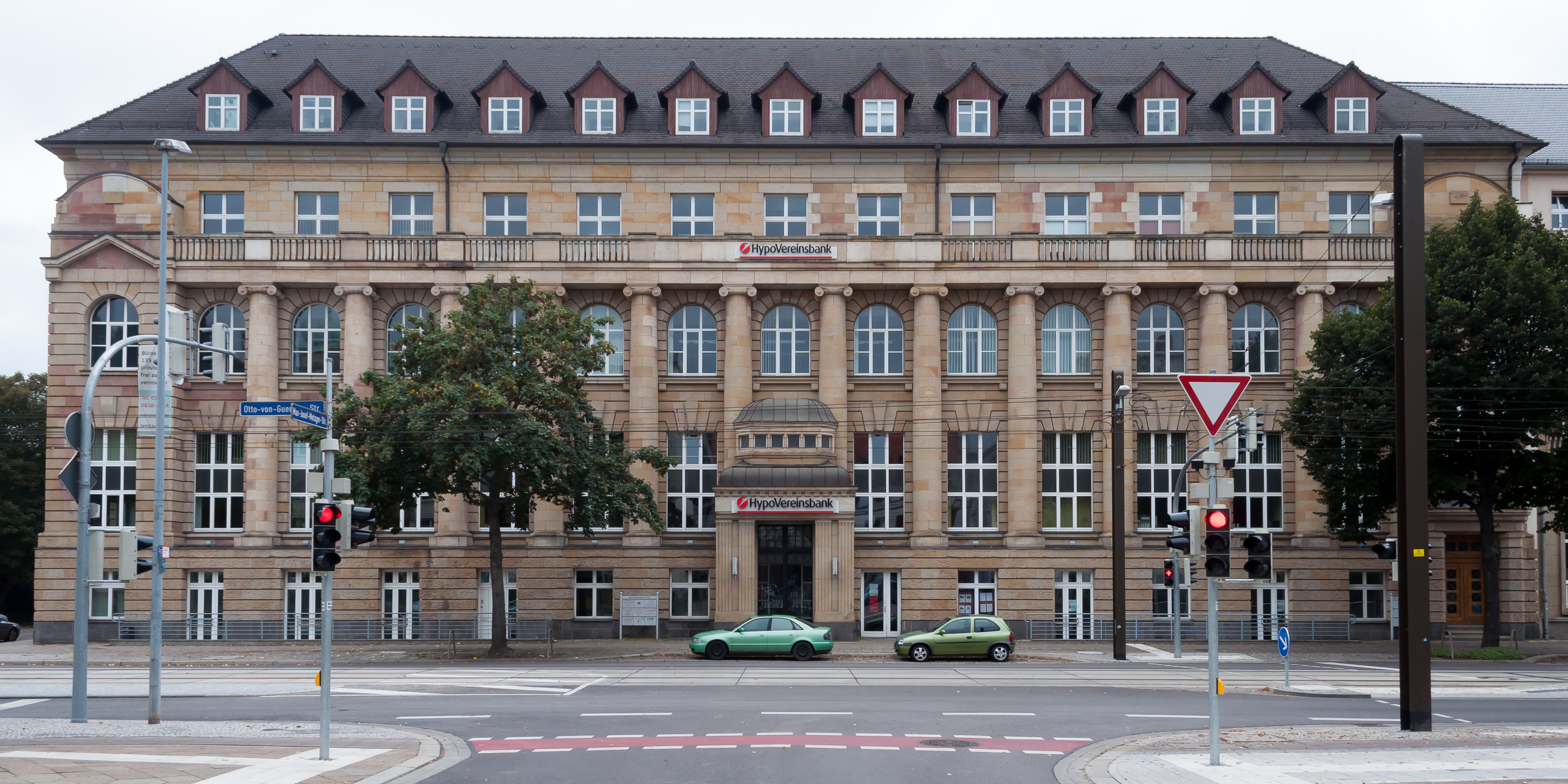
The same building in 2014, by then a branch of HypoVereinsbank

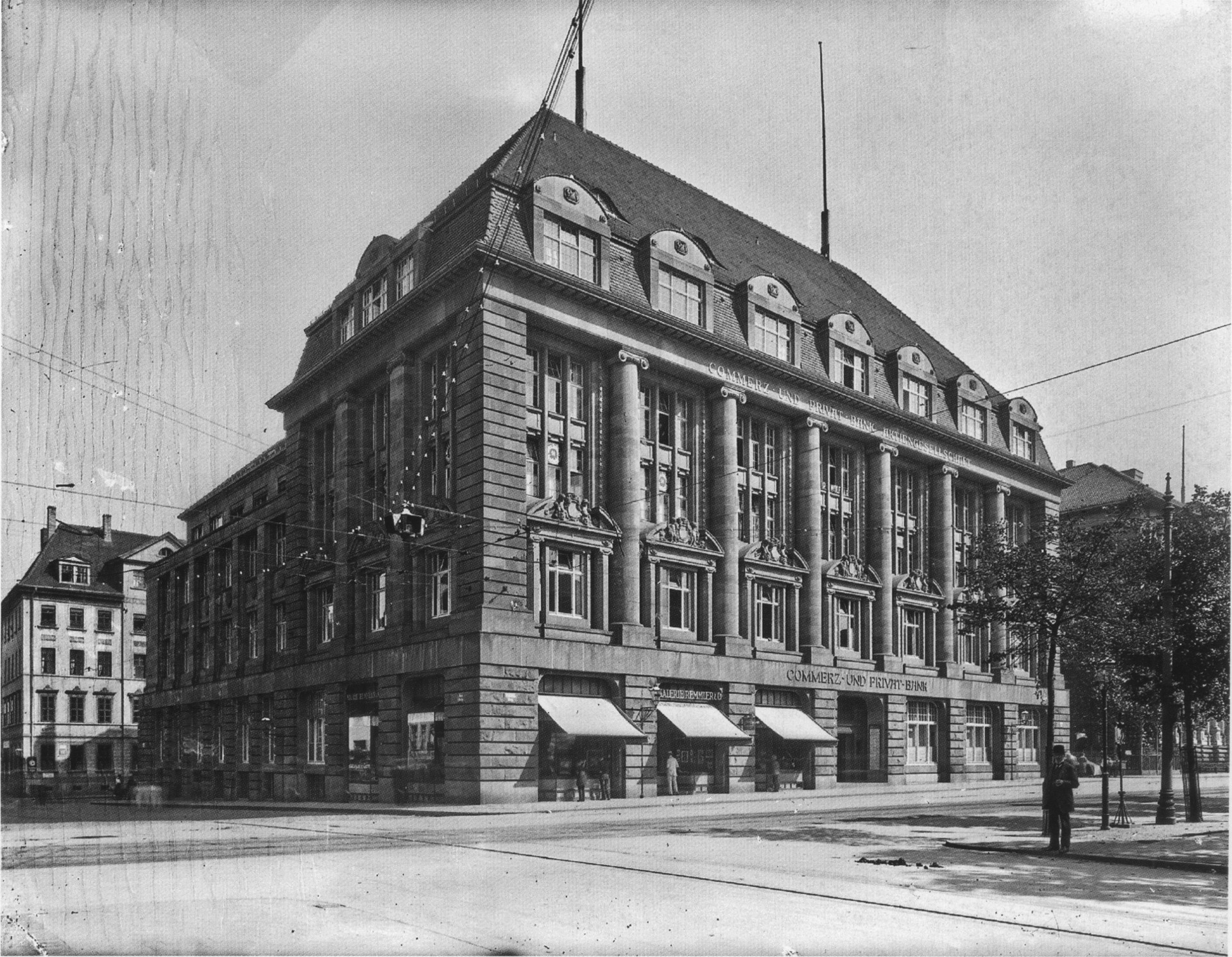
Commerz- und Privatbank in Leipzig, 1920

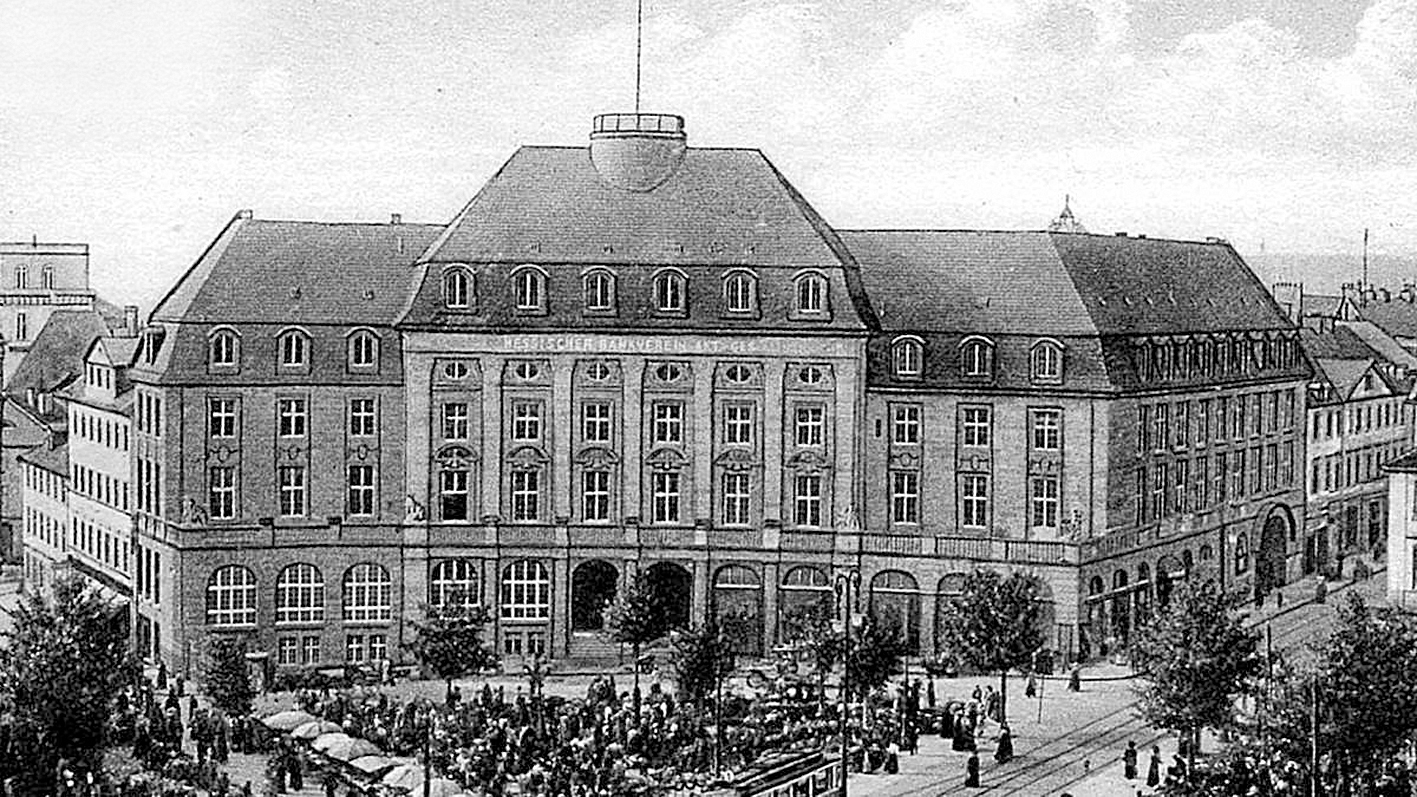
Former head office of Hessischer Bankverein in Kassel, taken over by Commerzbank in 1922

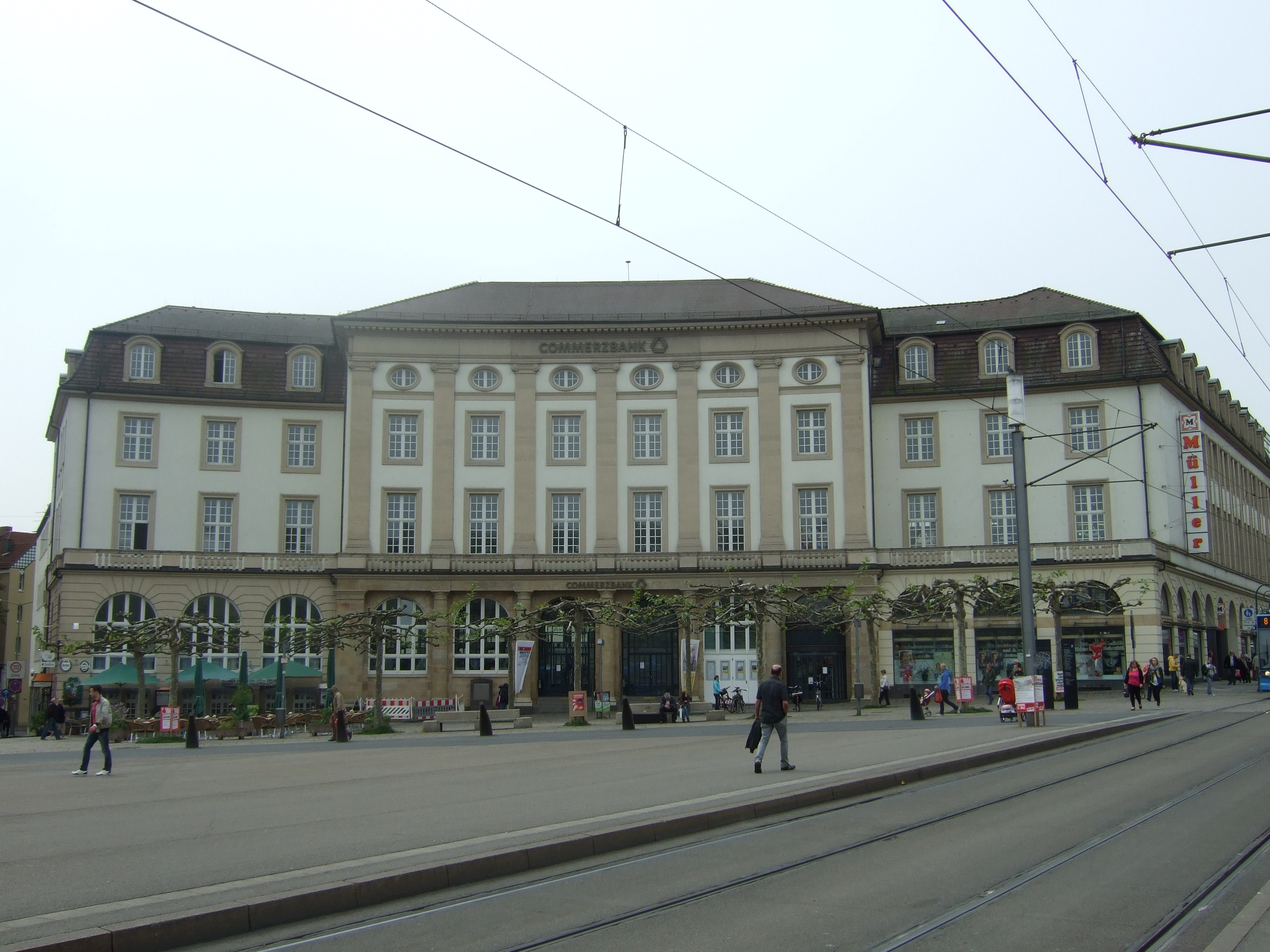
The same building in 2014

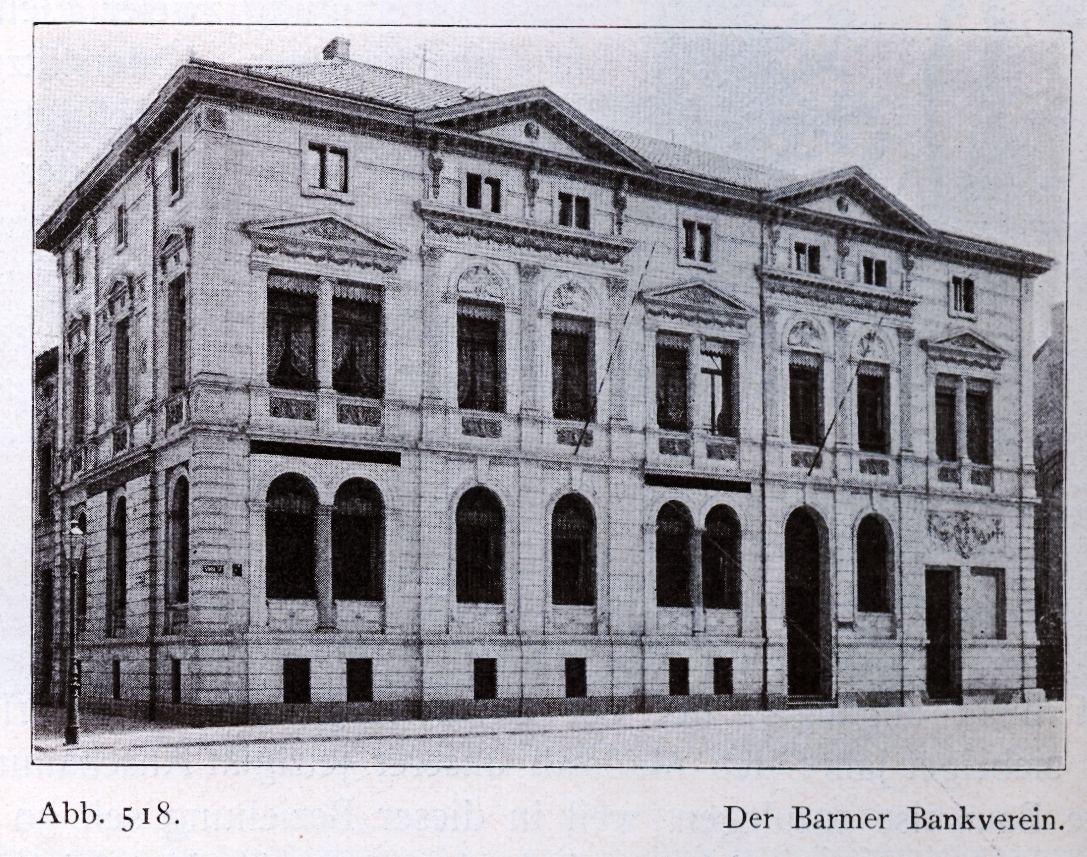
Hatzfeld'sches Palais in Düsseldorf, later Barmer Bankverein building

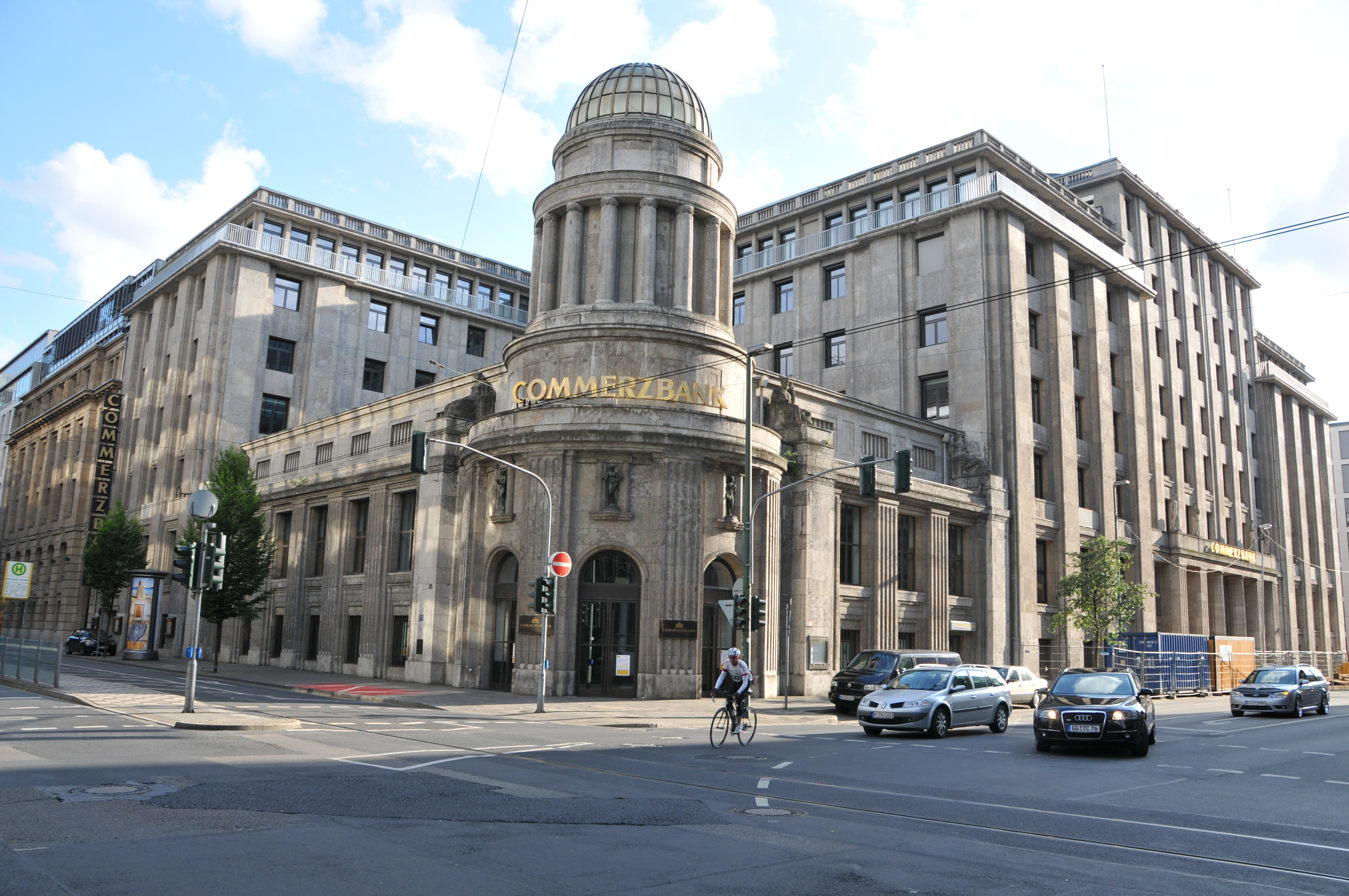
Former head office of Barmer Bankverein in Düsseldorf

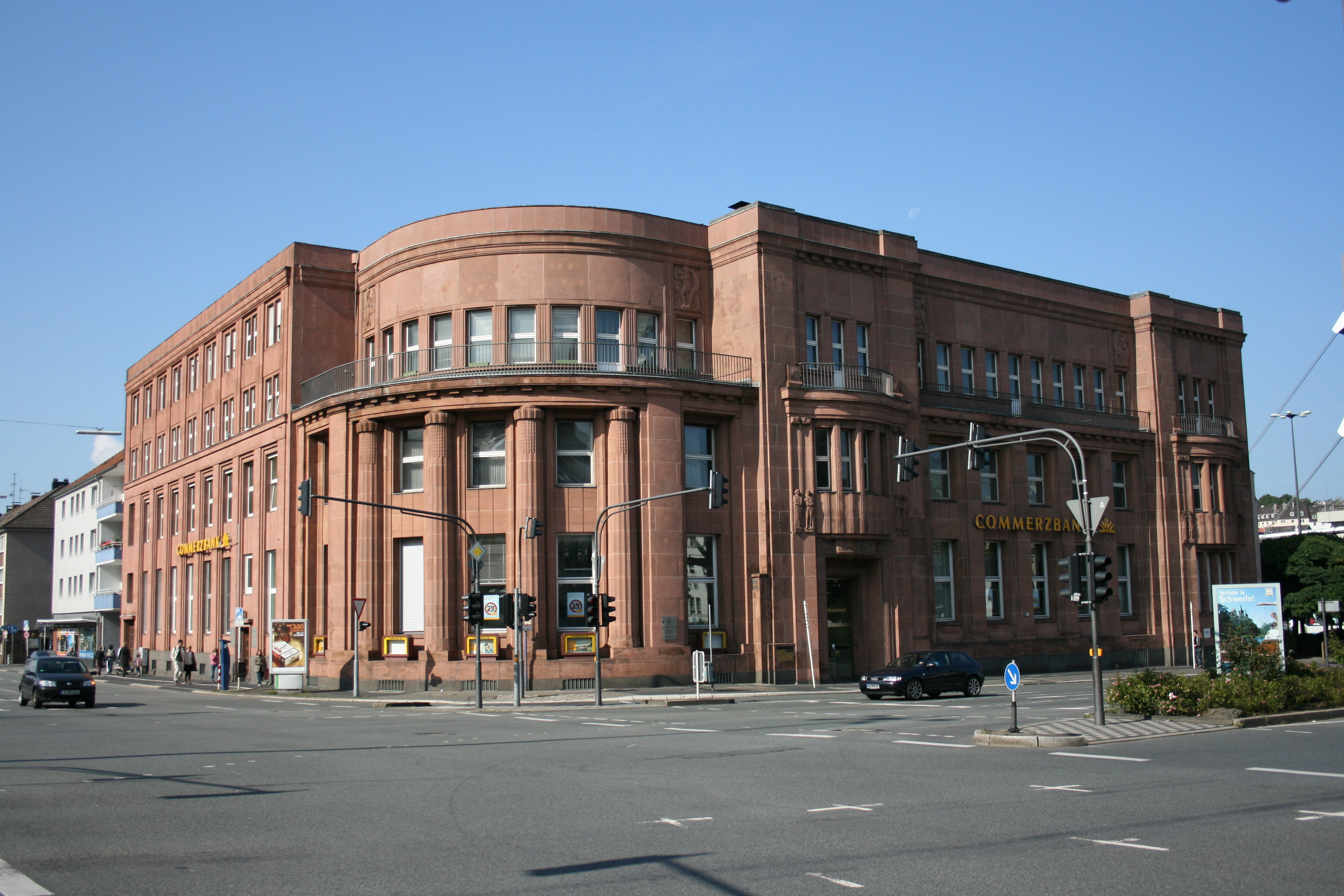
Former Barmer Bankverein building in Wuppertal

=== 1933–1945 ===
In 1935, Commerz- und Privat-Bank paid its first dividend in five years, and returned to private ownership in 1936–1937. In line with the Nazi policy of aryanization, the bank dismissed its Jewish staff, which by 1933 represented around 14 percent of its senior executives and 1.6 percent of employees overall. Supervisory board members Curt Sobernheim and Albert Katzenellenbogen left in 1933 and 1937 respectively, as did management board member Ludwig Berliner in 1933. All three would be murdered in the early 1940s under the Final Solution policy. Commerzbank had no Jewish employees by 1938. By September 1939 it had 6,900 employees, of which 16 percent were conscripted into the Wehrmacht. In 1940, the bank formally adopted the name Commerzbank AG, the name by which it had generally been referred to for a long time.

Through the 1938 Anschluss, the annexation of the Sudetenland, and during World War II, the bank opened branches and subsidiaries in the expanded German-controlled territory and also benefited from the expropriation or sale under duress of Jewish-owned banks. (Conversely, it closed its office in New York in 1939.) In 1940 it opened a branch in Strasbourg. In 1941 it took over the former Hugo Kaufmann & Co.'s Bank in Amsterdam and in 1942 renamed it the Rijnsche Handelsbank. In November 1941 it established Hansabank AG in Riga, with operations in Reval (December 1941) and Dorpat (December 1942), and in 1942, Hansabank NV / Banque Hanséatique SA in Brussels. In the former Yugoslavia, it took minority stakes of 6 and 10 percent respectively in Bankverein AG Belgrad and Bankverein für Kroatien AG in 1941, both carved out from the former Allgemeiner Jugoslawischer Bankverein which itself had been a product of dismantling Wiener Bankverein in the 1920s. In 1942 it also took a 10 percent stake in Böhmische Industriebank in Prague, and 10 percent in the newly established Deutsche Bank für Ostasien intended to develop trade with Imperial Japan. By late 1944, the bank's balance sheet size had tripled from its 1938 level, with two-thirds of the assets being German government debt. In comparative terms, however, it had been less expansionist and ideologically aligned than other large German banks, particularly Deutsche Bank and Dresdner Bank, and in 1942 fell from third to fourth place among German joint-stock banks. In early 1945, it relocated its head office from Berlin to Hamburg as a precautionary measure.

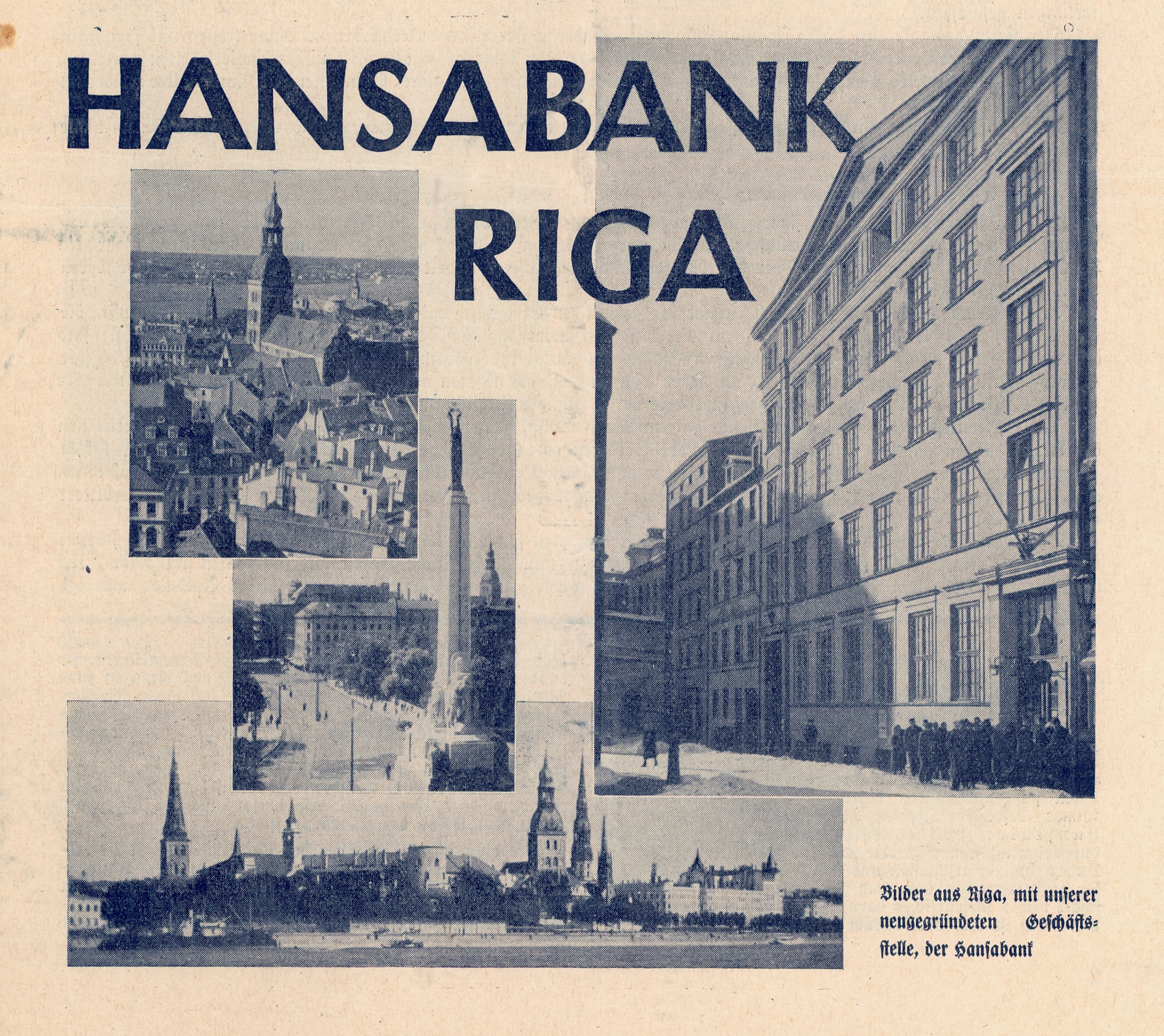
Advert for Hansabank Riga, 1942

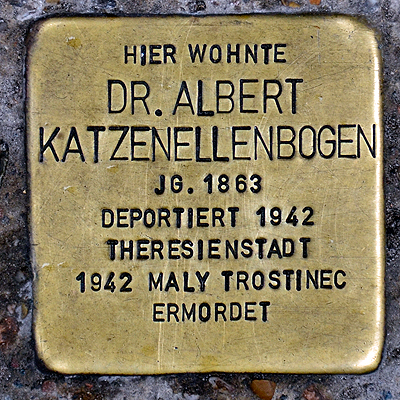
Stolperstein in memory of Albert Katzenellenbogen in front of the location of the former Frankfurt branch (and former head office of Mitteldeutsche Creditbank) at Neue Mainzer Strasse 32

=== 1945–1967 ===
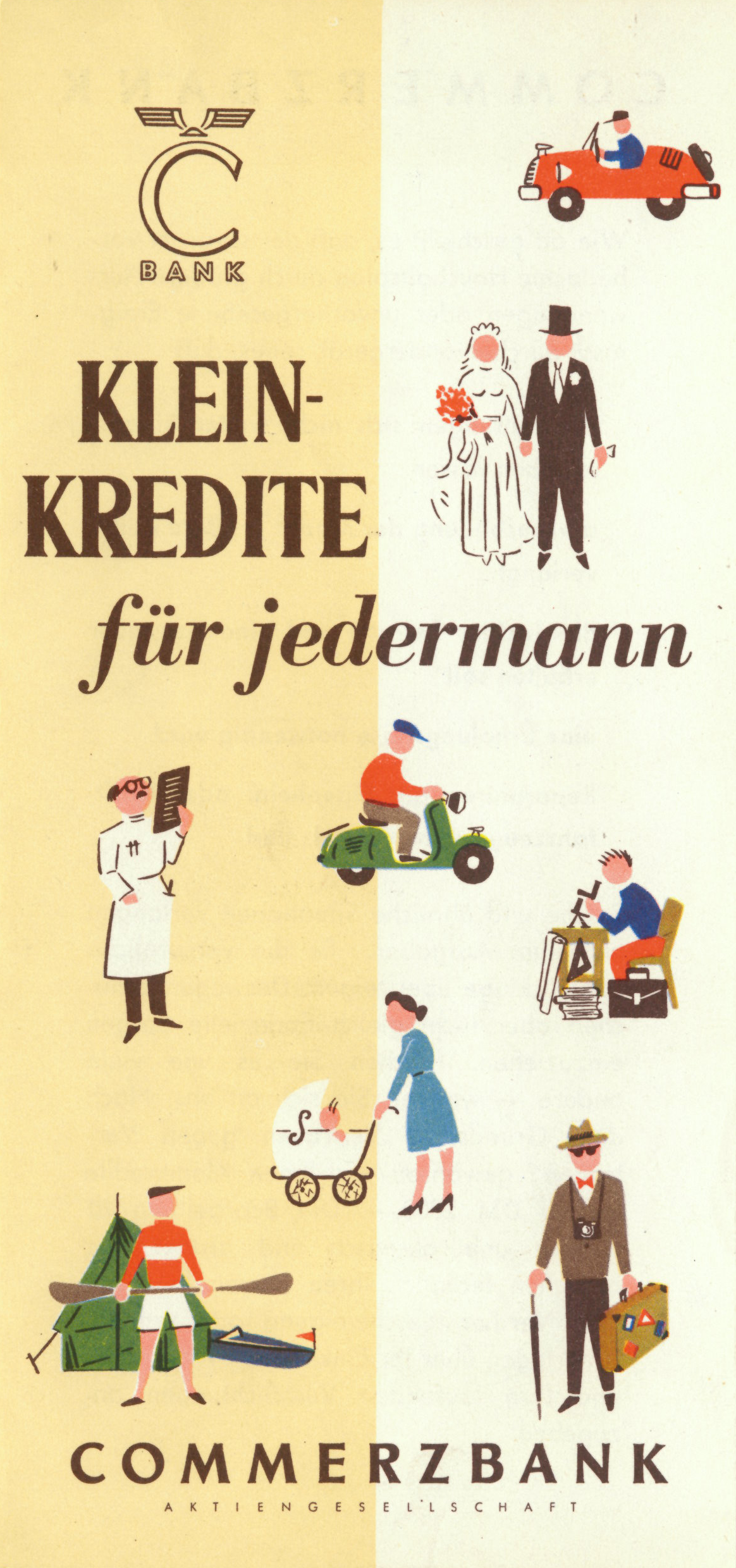
Commerzbank advertising poster (small loans for everyone) (1959)

By the end of the war the former head office and close to half of the bank's branches were in the Soviet occupation zone, where they were promptly nationalized and liquidated. Of the 119 locations in West Germany, 42 were fully destroyed, 35 severely damaged, and 42 in working condition. In 1947–1948, these were first reorganized into nine groups of branches, intended to be operationally independent: Bankverein Westdeutschland (Düsseldorf), Hansa-Bank (Hamburg), Merkur-Bank (Hanover), and Holsten-Bank (Kiel) in the British occupation zone; Mittelrheinische Bank (Mainz) in the French zone; and Mitteldeutsche Creditbank (Frankfurt), Bankverein für Württemberg-Baden (Stuttgart), Bayerische Disconto-Bank (Nuremberg), and Bremer Handels-Bank (Bremen) in the American zone. In August 1949, the bank resterted operations in West Berlin, first as Bankhaus Holbeck, renamed Bankgesellschaft Berlin AG in October, and later Berliner Commerzbank AG. In order to expand credit provision to the German economy, the nine West German entities were consolidated by law in September 1952 into three: Bankverein Westdeutschland AG, renamed Commerzbank-Bankverein AG in 1956, in Düsseldorf; Commerz- und Disconto-Bank AG in Hamburg; and Commerz- und Credit-Bank AG in Frankfurt. On 1 July 1958, the Düsseldorf entity acquired the other two and changed its name back to Commerzbank AG. Berliner Commerzbank AG only merged into the parent Commerzbank on 1 October 1992.

In 1951 several of the groups of Commerzbank branches had taken stakes in ADIG Allgemeine Deutsche Investment-Gesellschaft, Germany's first investment fund management company founded in 1949 in Munich, thus establishing the basis for the group's asset management arm. By 1962, Commerzbank had surpassed its pre-war level with 372 branches. Meanwhile, the Commerzbank group restarted an international activity by opening a representative office in Rio de Janeiro in 1952, followed by Amsterdam and Madrid in 1953, Beirut in 1957, and Tokyo in 1961, the first German bank to open in postwar Japan. in 1967, Commerzbank established a representative office in New York City. That same year, it joined with Irving Trust, First National Bank of Chicago, Westminster Bank, and HSBC to form the International Commercial Bank in London. In 1969 Commerzbank opened a subsidiary in Luxembourg, Commerzbank International SA (CISAL), which for many years was its largest foreign subsidiary. In 1971 the New York office was converted into a branch, the first by a German bank in the postwar United States. Commerzbank opened further branches in London in 1973, in Paris in 1976, and in Hong Kong in 1979. It opened a representation in Beijing on 16 April 1982.

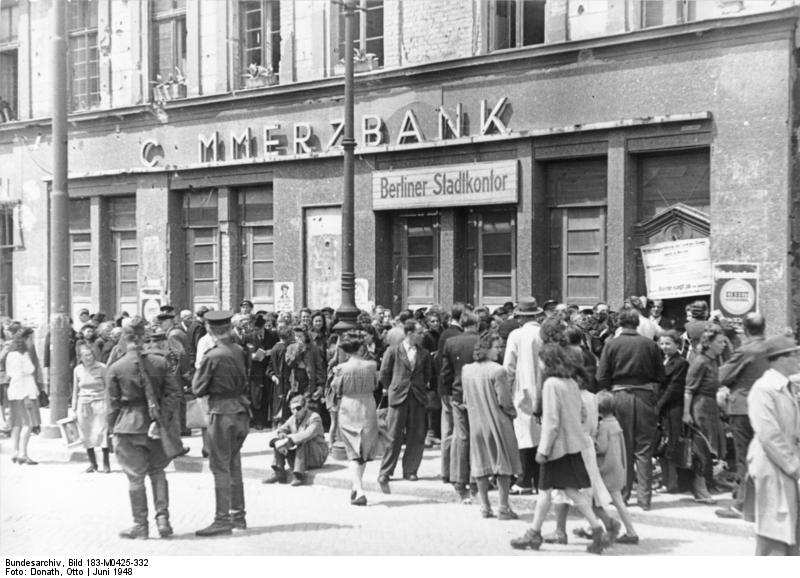
A former Commerzbank branch used as Stadtkontor during the currency exchange of June 1948 in East Berlin

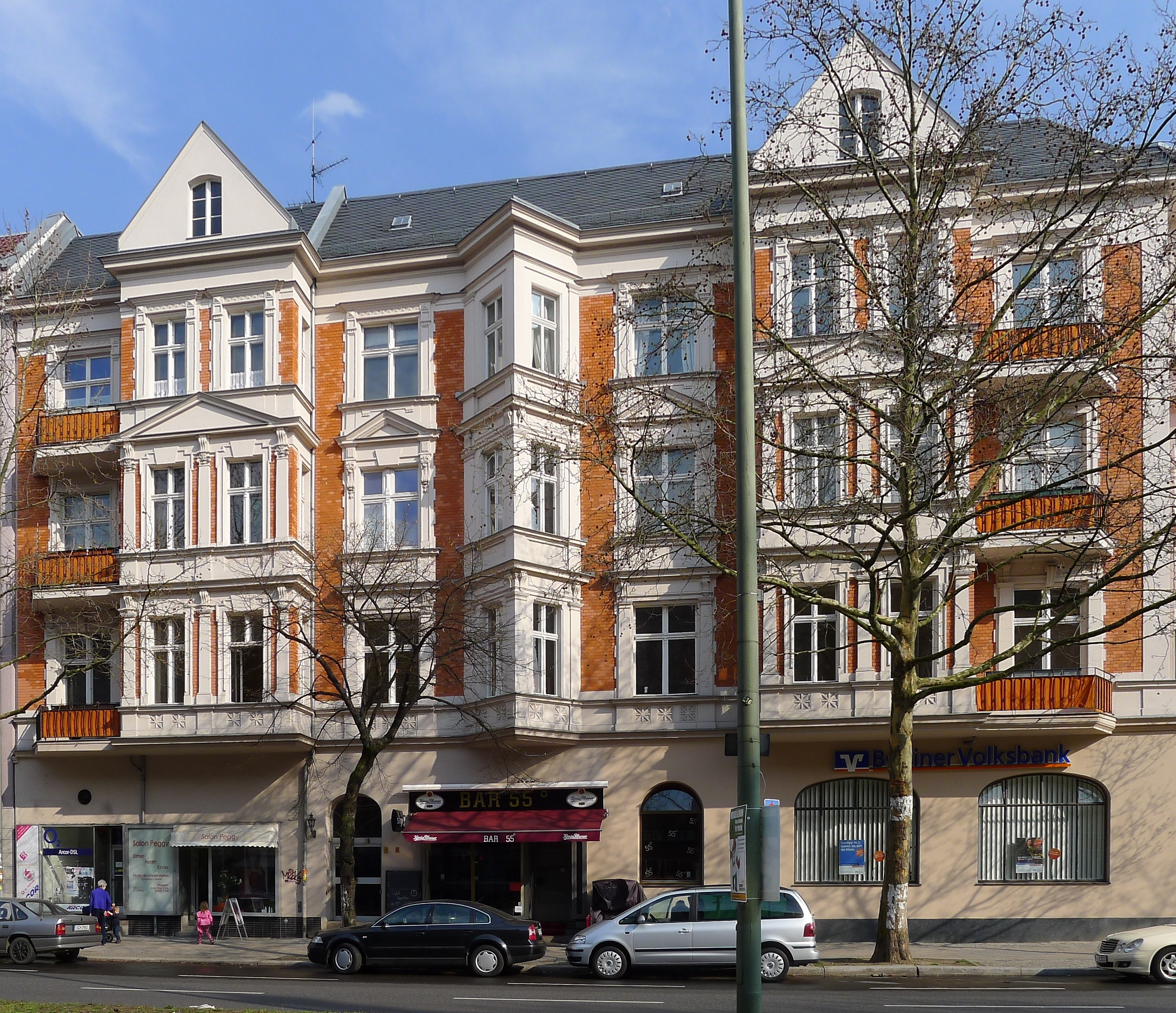
Rheinstrasse 55 in Berlin-Friedenau, where Commerzbank restarted its West Berlin activity in 1949

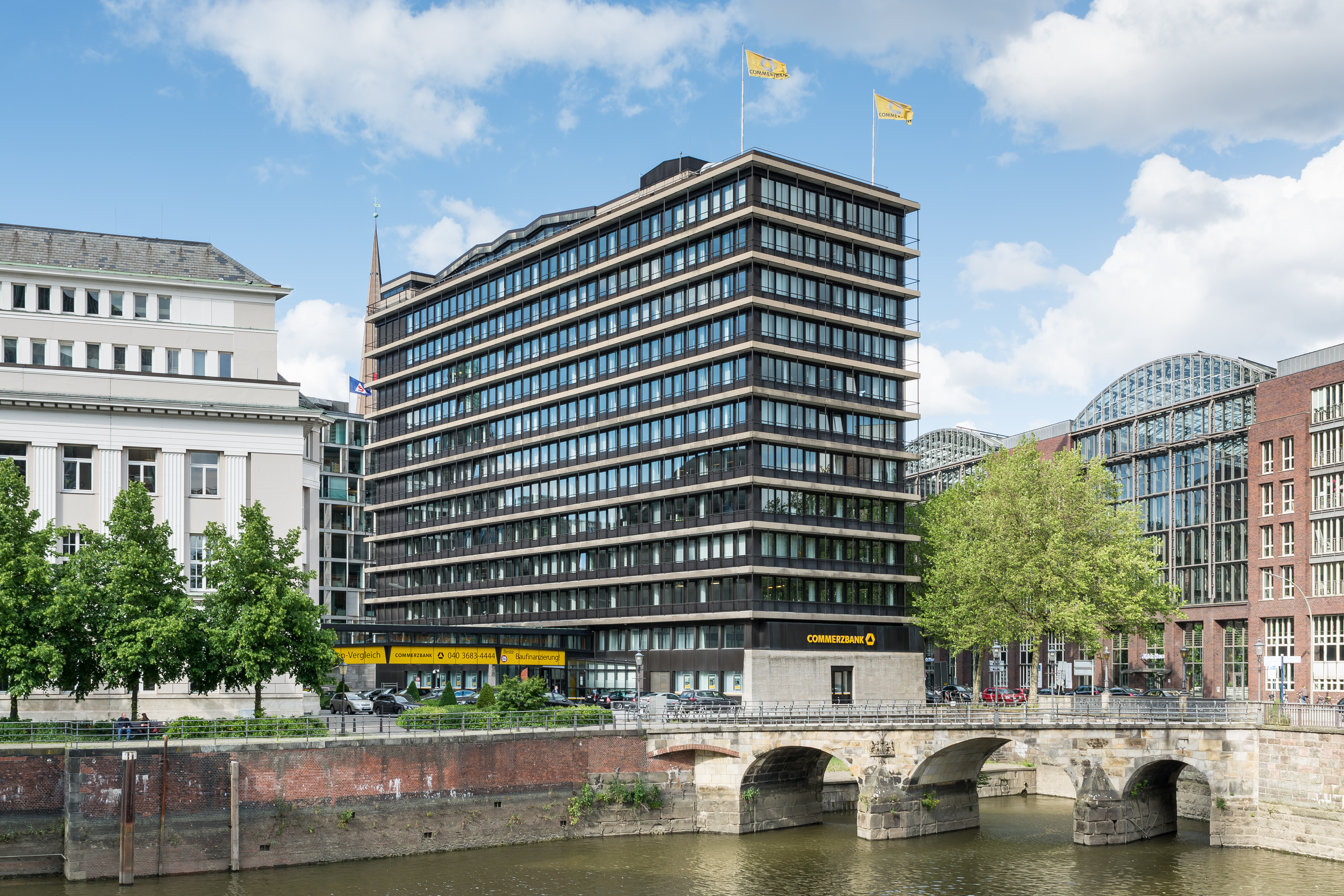
High-rise extension (center) of the historic head office building in Hamburg, erected in 1961–1964 on a design by architect Godber Nissen

=== 1970–1990 ===
Commerzbank and Crédit Lyonnais entered a strategic partnership, the "Europartners Group", on 14 October 1970, in order to achieve cross-border synergies despite public policies which at the time prevented outright cross-border mergers. They immediately formed a 50–50 joint venture for U.S. securities business, Europartners Securities Corporation, which absorbed Crédit Lyonnais's New York investment banking operation. The Europartners alliance was joined on 11 January 1971 by Banco di Roma, adopted a common logo (the "quatre vents") in 1972, and expanded to Madrid-based Banco Hispano Americano (BHA) in October 1973. In 1974 Commerzbank and Crédit Lyonnais merged their operations in Saarland into a joint venture majority owned by Commerzbank and called Commerz-Credit-Bank AG Europartner, with seat in Saarbrücken and small minority stakes by the other two Europartner banks. In 1984 Commerzbank acquired a 10 percent stake in BHA, and BHA in turn took a 5 percent stake in Commerzbank in 1989. In 1988 Commerzbank acquired full ownership of Europartners Securities Corporation in New York from Crédit Lyonnais, and subsequently renamed it Commerzbank Capital Markets Corporation. The Europartners alliance was eventually brought to an end in 1992.

In 1968, the Eurocheque system was introduced. Customers could now withdraw cash in 30 European countries using a cheque card. The Eurocheque card with a magnetic strip for ATMs was introduced in 1981. In 1970, Commerzbank founded the non-profit Commerzbank Foundation. As an independent foundation of civil law, it aims to promote and support the social commitment of Commerzbank. The focus areas are science, culture, and social welfare. The Commerzbank Foundation supports disadvantaged people, such as in their professional integration, and promotes contemporary art. In the early 1980s, Commerzbank faced a crisis due to mistakes in assessing interest rate developments. The good economic conditions later favored the restructuring under the leadership of Walter Seipp.

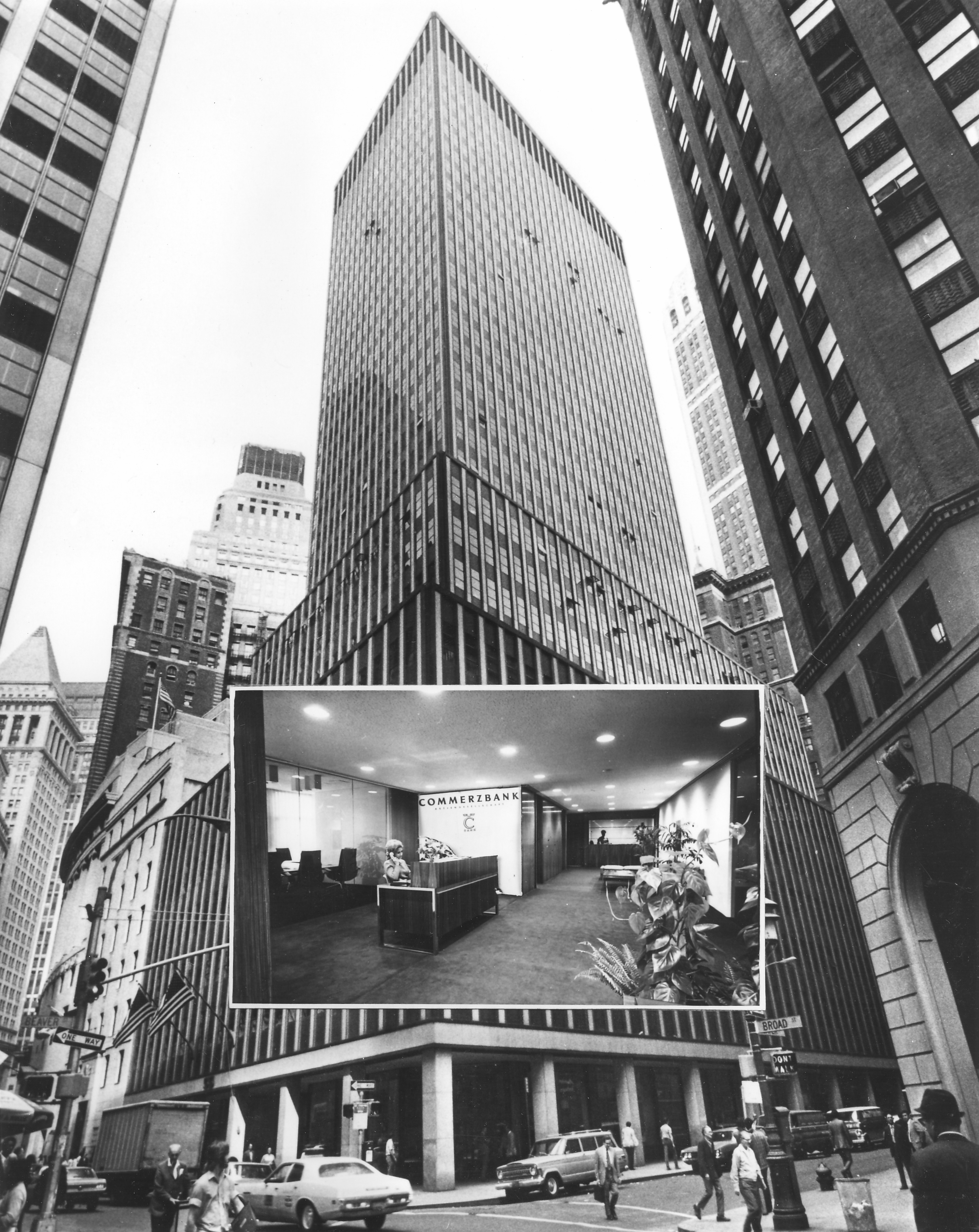
Opening of the first Commerzbank branch in New York City (1971)

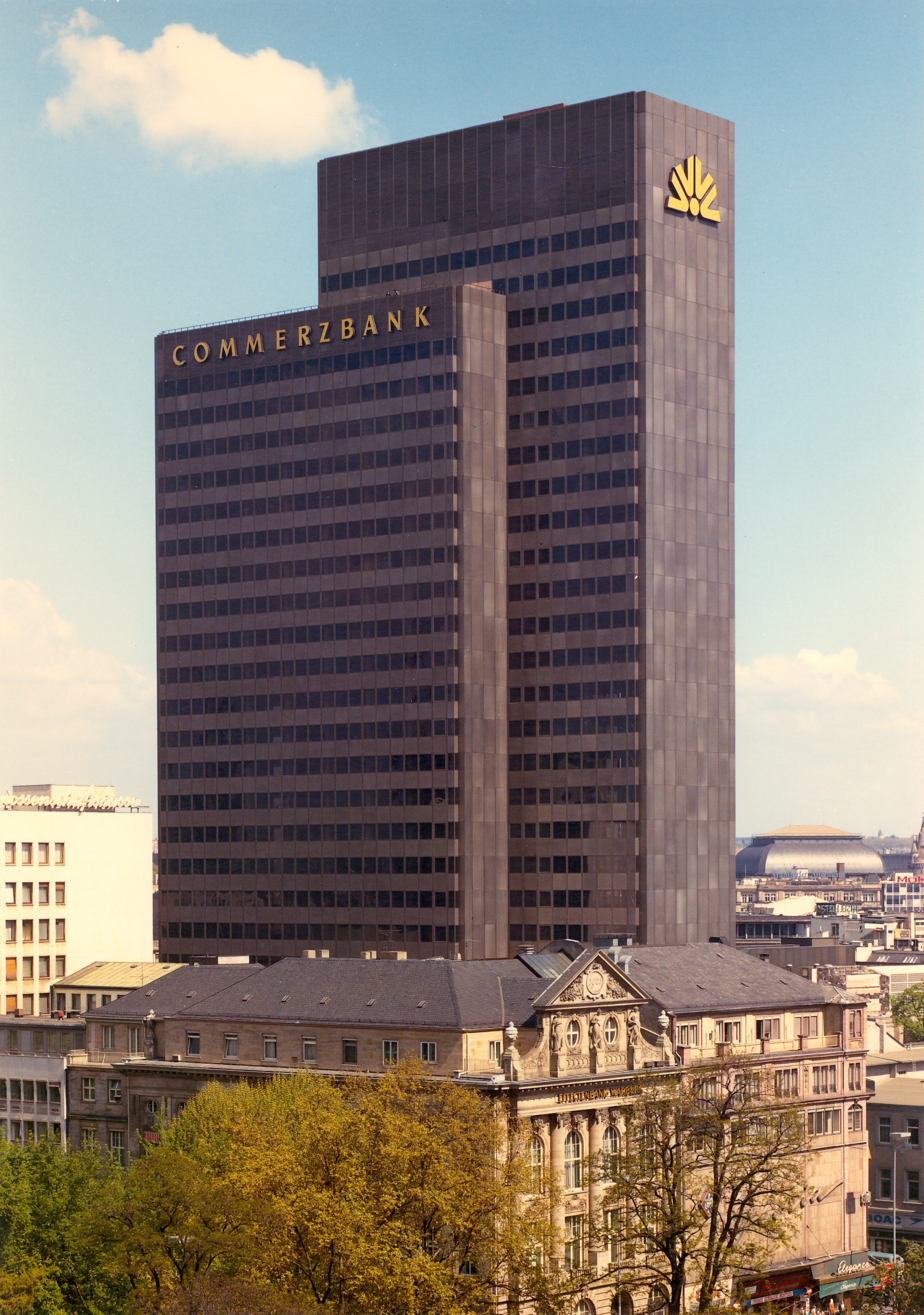
Neue Mainzer Straße 32–36 at Neue Mainzer Strasse 32–36 in Frankfurt, designed by architect Richard Heil, upon completion in 1974

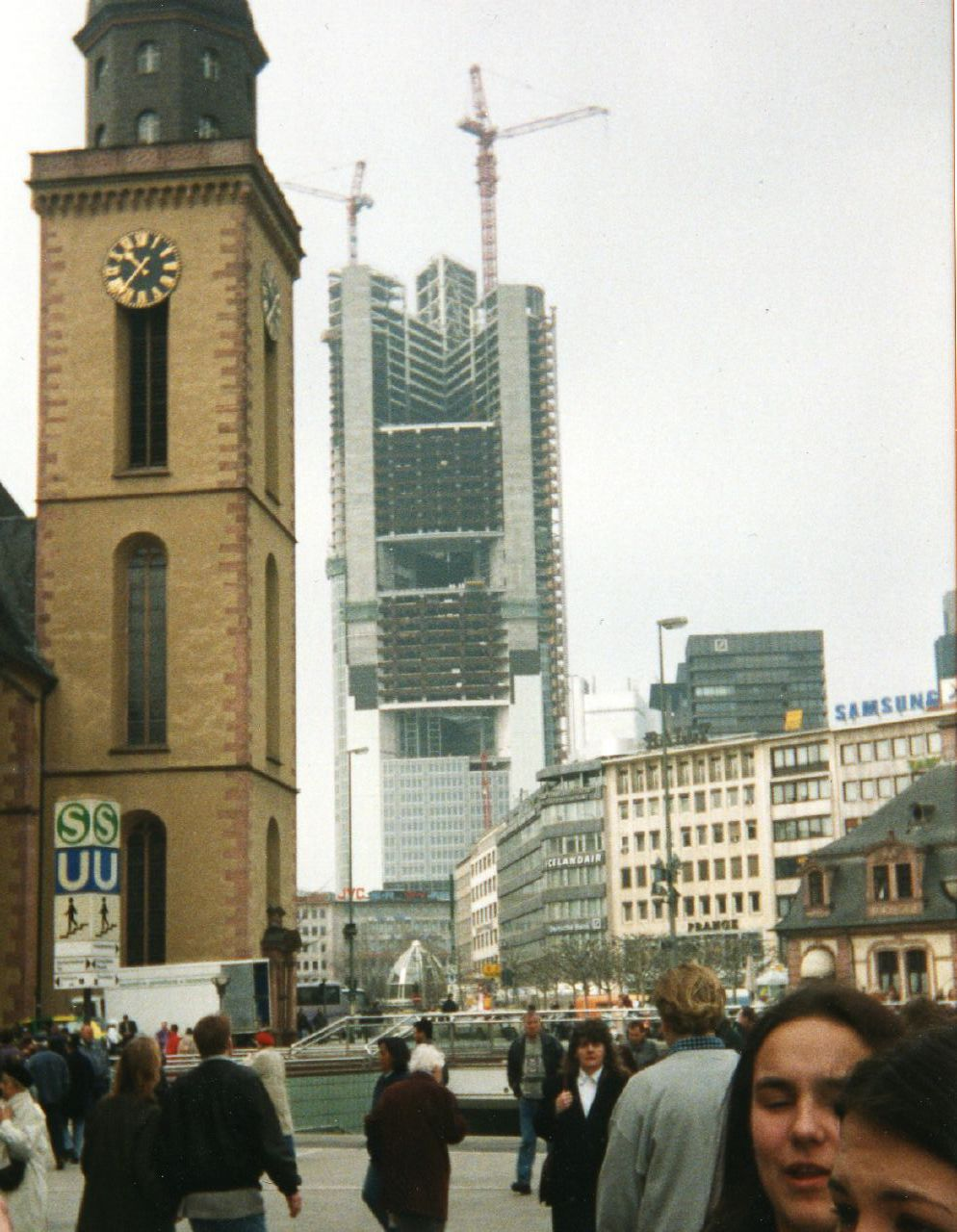
Commerzbank Tower under construction in Frankfurt, 1996

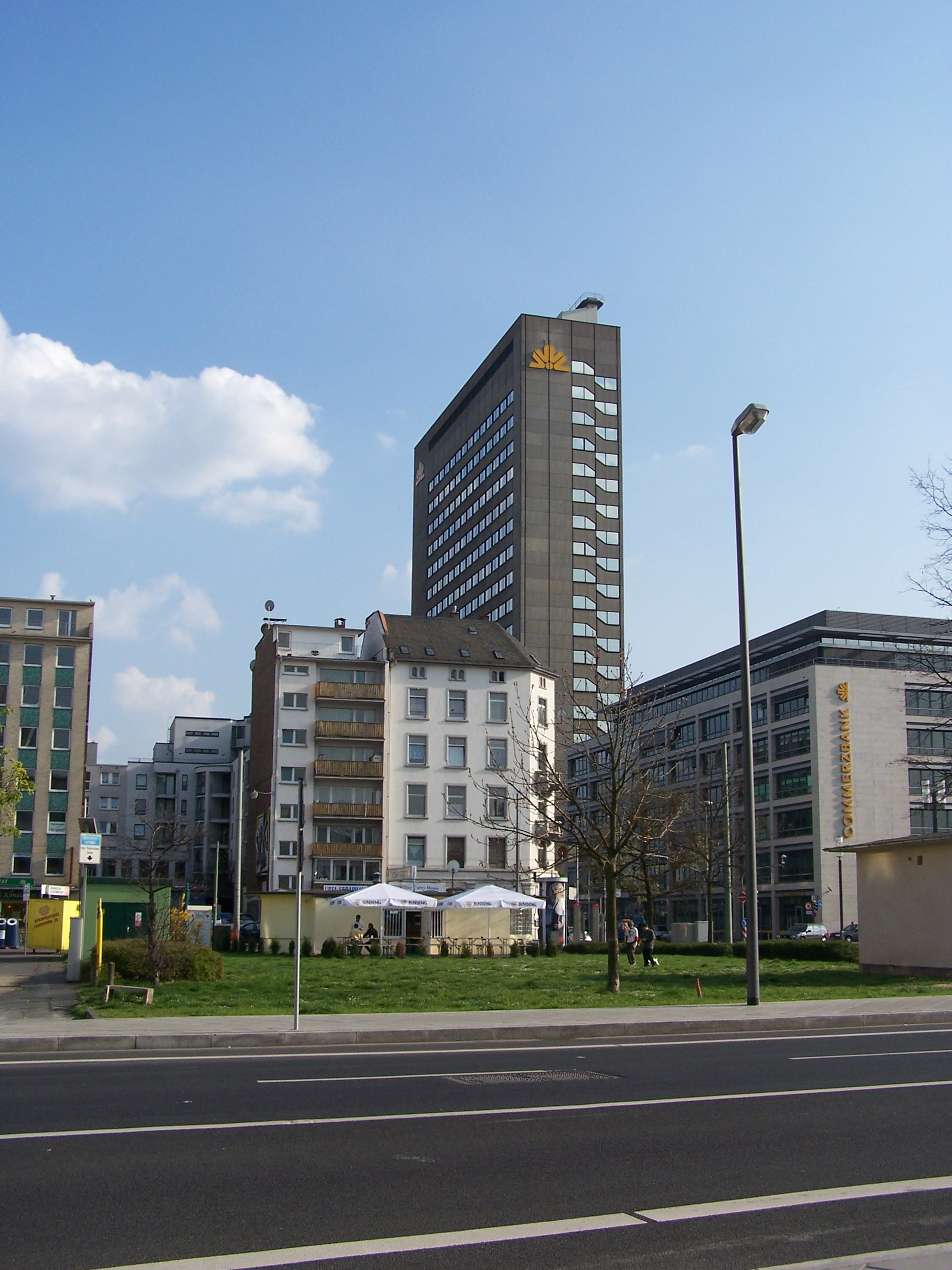
Commerzbank high-rise at Hafenstrasse 51, Frankfurt, in 2007

=== 1990–1998 ===
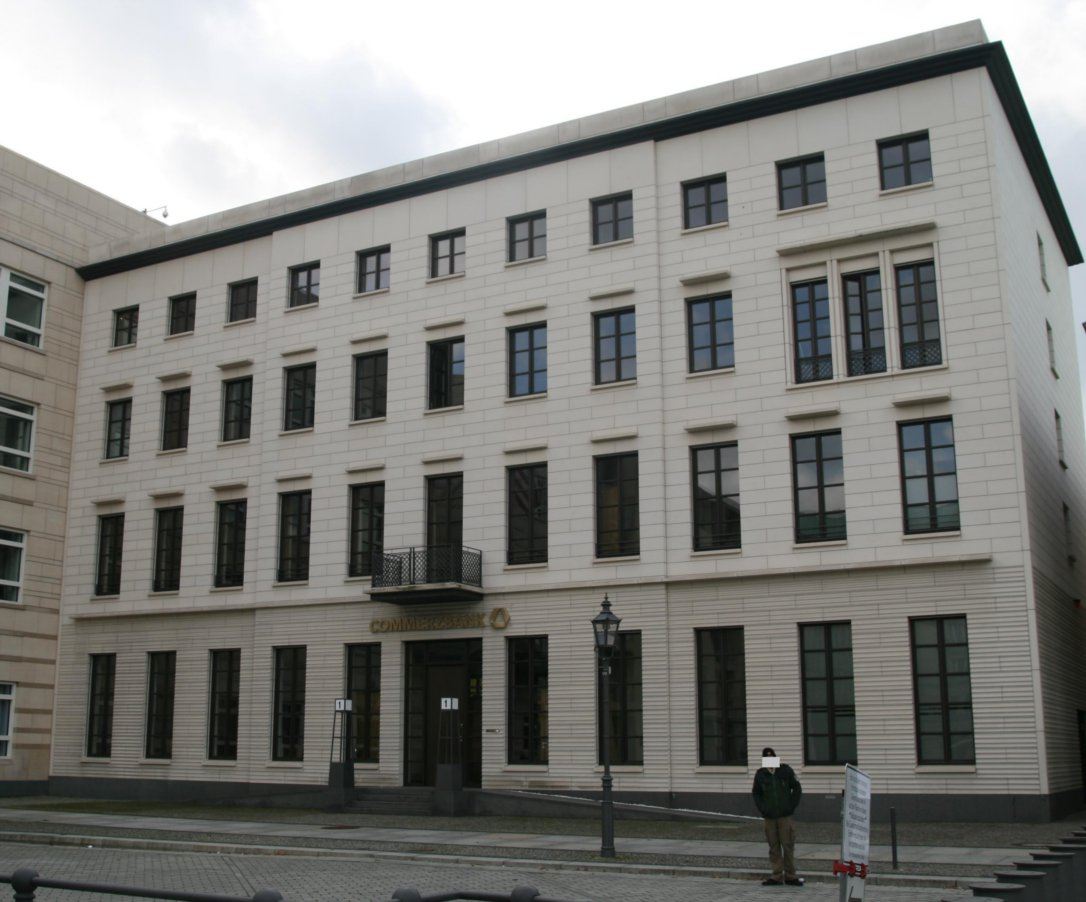
Haus Sommer on Pariser Platz in Berlin, reconstructed in 1998 as Haus der Commerzbank

In 1990, Commerzbank moved its registered office from Düsseldorf to Frankfurt am Main. The German reunification allowed Commerzbank to tap into new target groups; in the first three months after the Monetary, Economic and Social Union of Germany, around 80,000 customers and thousands of corporate clients chose the bank. Klaus-Peter Müller, appointed to the board in 1990, led the department responsible for preparing business in the new federal states.

The bank's engagement in the East developed into a crucial advantage. Alongside expansion in the domestic market, Commerzbank continued its internationalization, such as by opening an office in Bangkok. Later, Commerzbank became the first international financial institution to open a branch in South Africa. Commerzbank established its management consultancy to meet the demand for professional support.

In the early 1990s, Commerzbank significantly increased its earnings. However, the stock price remained comparatively low, leading to cost reductions and job cuts. This further improved the profit situation. Commerzbank then promised its shareholders a higher dividend. In 1991, a cross-border collaboration with the French Crédit Lyonnais was announced, seen as a signal for consolidation in the European financial industry. Two years later, a tri-national cooperation was established between the German Commerzbank, the British National Westminster Bank, and the French Société Générale.

In 1994, Commerzbank founded Comdirect Bank, becoming the first major German bank to enter the emerging direct banking market. 1999, Commerzbank also sold computers to facilitate customers' access to online banking. The branch network was also upgraded with digital technologies. At that time, the bank earned around two-thirds of its income abroad, for example, through its new representation in Taipei and expansions in Hungary and the Czech Republic. However, CEO Martin Kohlhaussen still demanded more performance, especially from the sales of domestic branches. Commerzbank aimed to significantly increase its return on equity in the second half of the 1990s to remain competitive internationally. Due to its comparatively low balance sheet total internationally, Commerzbank was seen as a takeover candidate in the 1990s. The board pursued an independent continuation of the business, interpreted as rejecting a merger with Deutsche Bank. Also, a potential acquisition of Postbank by Commerzbank, which was discussed at times and would have led to a financial conglomerate with a building society and insurance, ultimately did not materialize.

The bank managed to increase its customer base significantly. With fewer branches, it generated more profit. At the same time, innovative new services were created, such as cash withdrawal at gas stations and online banking for corporate customers. The public critically received the outsourcing of employees to a temporary employment agency. After acquiring stakes in numerous foreign banks and insurance companies during the 1990s, Commerzbank bought around 30 percent of the Korea Exchange Bank in 1998 to more actively participate in developing emerging Asian markets. Despite the continent's financial market problems, the bank saw opportunities for above-average growth. Alongside international expansion, Commerzbank focused on strengthening its European presence, mainly through alliances with other large banks.

=== 2001–2009 ===
Commerzbank suffered reversals in a disastrous foray into investment banking in the first half decade of the 2000s and eventually shut down its Commerzbank Securities investment banking unit run by Mehmet Dalman and Roman Schmidt after Chairman Klaus-Peter Müller labelled it a "problem child" and a review by consulting firm Mercer Oliver Wyman which concluded that Commerzbank Securities lacked a viable business model. What was left of Commerzbank Securities was folded into a division of the commercial bank called Corporates and Markets.

In 2001, Commerzbank restructured its domestic business. It created a bank for private customers and a separate unit for corporate and investment clients. Units were sometimes opened on Saturdays to remain competitive in the increasingly challenging private customer market. In 2004, it confirmed the acquisition of Schmidt Bank based in Hof, gaining 70 branches and 29 other locations in Bavaria, Thuringia, and Saxony, increasing its private customer base by 360,000 to 4.3 million. The transaction was seen as rejecting a merger with the Bavarian HypoVereinsbank. In addition to digital activities and growth in the domestic market, especially among corporate clients, Commerzbank explored various acquisitions in Central and Eastern Europe. With the majority takeover of Poland's BRE Bank (today's mBank) in 2003, it significantly expanded its regional engagement. Moreover, Commerzbank grew in smaller markets, such as in Romania. Revenues from Central and Eastern Europe were expected to grow significantly. Furthermore, Commerzbank relocated back-office activities, such as IT systems, to Poland and the Czech Republic.

In 2001, the three major Frankfurt banks, Deutsche Bank, Dresdner Bank, and Commerzbank, decided to establish a joint mortgage bank. Eurohypo commenced its business operations in the second half of 2002. Following the dot-com bubble's collapse and subsequent turmoil in financial markets, Commerzbank had to make significant write-downs on its stake as early as 2003. For a time, the major shareholders even waived their dividends to improve the financing of Eurohypo. Eurohypo distanced itself from Commerzbank. An initial public offering (IPO) was initially discussed to strengthen the company's independence. Despite initial challenges, Eurohypo became an important component in Commerzbank's earnings statement. Therefore, the bank stopped the IPO planned 2005 to prepare for its takeover of Eurohypo. The re-entry into public and real estate financing marked a significant change in the company's strategy. Eurohypo initially insisted on its independence.

In November 2005, Commerzbank finally announced the complete takeover of Eurohypo after agreeing on terms for acquiring shares from Deutsche Bank and Dresdner Bank. This step elevated Commerzbank to the second-largest bank in Germany. Observers described the surprising acquisition as a strategic coup, especially in competition with domestic rivals. To finance the acquisition, the bank conducted a capital increase. Even after the takeover, Eurohypo remained largely independent. The real estate business became an essential pillar of the group.

As early as the early 2000s, there were rumors about a merger of Commerzbank with another major European financial institution. After the failed merger of Deutsche Bank with Dresdner Bank, Commerzbank was considered the most likely candidate for acquiring Dresdner Bank. Such discussions started around June 2000. The possibilities discussed included the formation of a large financial conglomerate, possibly involving Allianz. Trade unions viewed the merger of Commerzbank and Dresdner Bank critically in light of potential job cuts, as did the investment company Cobra, which held stakes in both financial institutions. On the other hand, Generali, the Italian finance and insurance conglomerate and another major shareholder of Commerzbank, explicitly expressed positive views on the plans. Ultimately, the plans failed because it was impossible to bring together the different interests of all parties into a familiar concept. A critical factor was also the conflict over the valuation of Commerzbank and Dresdner Bank. Additionally, a cross-border merger was considered more sensible. Both banks emphasized their independence.

During the 2008 financial crisis, there were renewed speculations about the merger of Commerzbank with other banks. Initially, there was also talk of a large merger involving Commerzbank, Dresdner Bank, and Postbank. By mid-year, a merger of Commerzbank and Dresdner Bank was likely. In particular, Allianz, as the largest shareholder of Dresdner Bank, expected new momentum for its business from such a merger. After months of negotiations, the parties finally announced Commerzbank's takeover of Dresdner Bank. This was seen as a milestone in reorganizing the German financial industry. Allianz valued the purchase price at around 9.8 billion euros, assuming loss risks of up to 975 million euros. In the first step, Commerzbank was to acquire about 60 percent of Dresdner Bank, with plans to buy the remaining shares later. This was the largest merger of two financial institutions in years. Commerzbank and Dresdner Bank both expected to realize millions in synergies. Although Allianz initially rejected renegotiations, the parties agreed to reduce the purchase price to 5.5 billion euros. It was also decided to move the takeover from the second half of 2009 to the beginning of the year.

Analysts and investors criticized the merger of Commerzbank and Dresdner Bank during the 2008 financial crisis. The transaction significantly affected the stock prices of all involved companies. Due to the credit risks of Dresdner Bank that became apparent at the end of 2008, Commerzbank utilized the Special Fund for Financial Market Stabilization (SoFFin). After the German federal government and the European Commission agreed on the assistance details, Commerzbank received a silent participation of 8.2 billion euros. Initially, Commerzbank emphasized that the state's participation was necessary due to the devaluation of banks and not specifically because of the takeover of Dresdner Bank. By the end of 2009, this assessment had to be revised. Commerzbank sought additional state aid, leading to the Federal Republic of Germany acquiring over 25 percent of Commerzbank's shares, thereby securing a blocking minority. This was the first partial nationalization of a German financial institution. The silent participation of SoFFin increased to around 16.4 billion euros.

In January 2009, Commerzbank became the sole owner of Dresdner Bank, holding 100 percent of its shares. The merger of Dresdner Bank into Commerzbank was registered in the commercial register in May of the same year. An agreement on balancing interests and a social plan, including a new organizational structure for the headquarters, was reached with the employee representatives. Even after the takeover, the major bank maintained its lending to the struggling German economy to prevent a credit crunch in the mid-market sector. At the end of March 2009, Commerzbank formed its internal bad bank, called PRU (Portfolio Restructure Unit), into which non-strategically valuable securities worth 15.5 billion euros from Commerzbank and 39.9 billion euros from Dresdner Bank were outsourced. A joint bad bank with the nationalized Hypo Real Estate was sometimes discussed.

The following years were marked by the integration of Dresdner Bank into Commerzbank. The merging of IT platforms, in particular, became a challenge. The "Dresdner Bank" brand was gradually phased out, with the new Commerzbank adopting some aspects of Dresdner Bank's former corporate identity. The rebranding became visible at branches within three weeks. By May 2011, both financial institutions' strategic and operational integration was largely completed. Commerzbank evaluated the process as a success and highlighted the positive response from all relevant target groups.

=== 2011–2023 ===
In 2011, Commerzbank began repaying the silent participation of SoFFin. One of the most significant capital increases in German history partly financed this: a total volume of 14 billion euros, comprising 11 billion from investors and 3 billion from the bank's reserves. Despite criticism, the general meeting approved the measure. As a result of the 2008 financial crisis and partial nationalization, the bank lost public trust. At the end of 2012, the bank launched an advertising campaign in which it openly admitted past mistakes and positioned itself as a fair and competent financial service provider. This was met with criticism in the industry.

The Greek debt crisis and its global impact unexpectedly heavily affected Commerzbank's profitability. The bank responded with a radical austerity program, which included limiting credit outside Germany and Poland. By selling Cominvest to Allianz, Commerzbank no longer owned its own fund company. Additionally, Eurohypo was to be sold or split up. Write-downs on government bonds and real estate loans continuously led to losses, making the company no longer viable. Therefore, in 2012, the bank ultimately decided on a wind-down, accepting further losses in the accelerated reduction of its portfolio.

The decade following the takeover and integration of Dresdner Bank brought further profound changes for Commerzbank caused by the digitalization of all areas of public life. In response, Martin Zielke, who became CEO in 2016, announced a radical restructuring. Commerzbank mainly aimed to strengthen its private and corporate customer business in Germany further. The focus was now on a profitable multi-channel bank. To this end, the bank maintained its branch network while many other banks reduced their local presence. Additionally, the thriving business with medium-sized corporate customers was to continue unhindered.

In 2019, there were concrete talks between Commerzbank and Deutsche Bank about a merger. However, after a thorough examination, the boards of both banks needed more added value, so the merger ultimately did not happen. The cancellation led to further disagreements with major shareholders over Commerzbank's strategic direction. These were the reasons for the joint resignation of the Chairman of the Board of Managing Directors and the Chairman of the Supervisory Board in the summer of 2020.

In January 2021, Manfred Knof took over as chairman of the Board of Commerzbank. Under his leadership, the board focused on profitability, customer orientation, sustainability, and digitalization. Based on Commerzbank's advisory expertise and Comdirect's digital competence, the business model of a digital advisory bank was established. The concept of the multi-channel bank was further developed to create equal access for customers online and offline. An example of this is the newly introduced nationwide advisory centers.

Costs were massively reduced to maintain Commerzbank's independence and cushion risks from inflation and interest rate developments. By early 2023, around 10,000 full-time positions were cut, and about half of all branches in Germany were closed. In the financial year 2022, the bank reported its best result in over ten years and was pleased to rejoin the German leading index, DAX, in 2023. Observers attributed the good results partly to the increased central bank base rates. The development of the corporate customer business was also highlighted. German economic media spoke of a "turnaround" for Commerzbank after the 2008 financial crisis. The bank continued the positive development in the financial year 2023 and further increased its profit. It was the best result in 15 years.

For the financial year 2022, Commerzbank distributed 30 percent of its profit to shareholders. It was the first distribution since 2018. In addition to paying a dividend of 20 cents per share, the bank conducted the first share buyback in its history in June 2023, with a volume of 122 million euros. For the financial year 2023 the bank targets to distribute 50 percent of the profit to shareholders, consisting of another share buyback with a volume of 600 million euros and a planned dividend payment. Based on its capital return policy the bank aims to increase the pay-out ratio to at least 70 percent for the financial year 2024, but not more than the net result. This would also benefit the Federal Republic of Germany's Finance Agency as the largest single shareholder.

=== 2024–present ===
On 14 February 2024 Germany was reported to have declined to take part in Commerzbank's share buy-back programme. As a result, Germany would increase its stake in the institution to 16.5%. In September 2024 the Germany revealed plans to sell 4.5% of Commerzbank. It was revealed later that month that UniCredit under Andrea Orcel had been the buyer, and that he had informed the European Central Bank of his intention to increase his stake to more than 30%. Chancellor Olaf Scholz was affronted and angry and Florian Toncar,Parliamentary State Secretary in the Federal Ministry of Finance, counselled against the Italian's plan. In October 2024 Bettina Orlopp became chair of the board.

As of 2025 Commerzbank was Germany's second-largest retail bank and had around 20,000 full-time employees in its home market. CEO Bettina Orlopp announced in February 2025 that around 3,900 full-time positions will be cut by 2028. Around 3,300 of these will be in Germany. Also in 2025, the bank wanted to prevent a hostile takeover by the Italian institute UniCredit. In July 2025, UniCredit announced that it had increased its stake in Commerzbank to 20%. On 16 March 2026, UniCredit officially launched a €35bn takeover bid on Commerzbank, which consisted of a voluntary exchange offer valuing Commerzbank at around €35bn and with the stated aim of increasing its stake in the German lender beyond the 30% threshold. Investors representing 12.51% of shares tendered their shares which, along with derivative positions, took UniCredit's total position to 42.5%. Investors representing 12.51% of shares tendered their shares which, along with derivative positions, took UniCredit's total position to 42.5%. On 16 March 2026, UniCredit officially launched a €35bn takeover bid for Commerzbank, consisting of a voluntary exchange offer valuing Commerzbank at around €35bn and aiming to increase its stake to more than 30%. The Commerzbank board rejected this offer in May 2026. Investors representing 12.51% of shares tendered their shares which, along with derivative positions, took UniCredit's total position to 42.5% in June 2026. In early July, CEO Bettina Orlopp expressed concerns about UniCredit's proposed takeover of the bank.By July 2026, UniCredit had secured 47.6% of shares in Commerzbank. In November 2026, UniCredit CEO Andrea Orcel said the bank planned to cut €1.4 billion in costs at Commerzbank, with 40% of the savings coming from areas unrelated to jobs.

== Operations ==
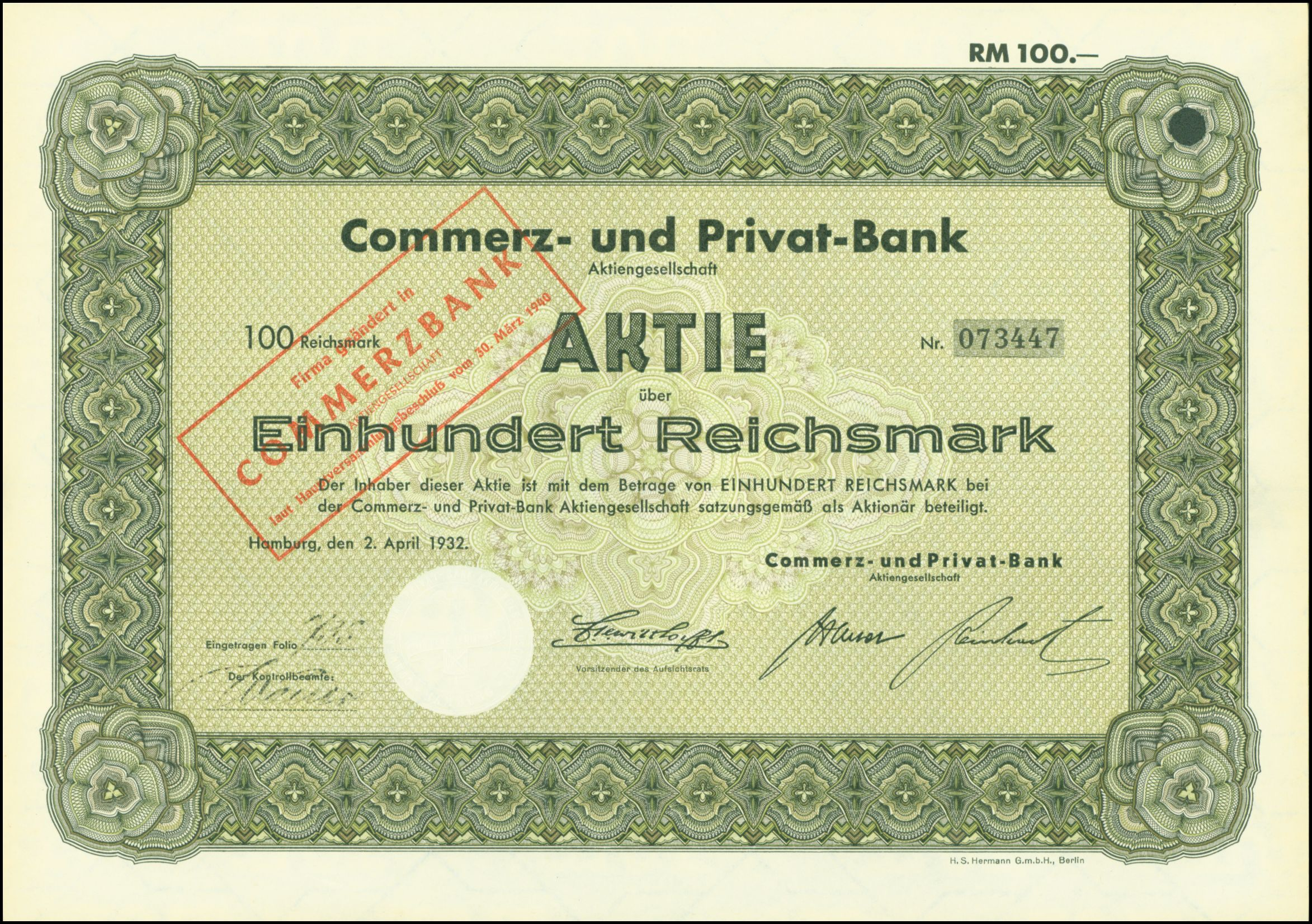
Historical share of Commerz- und Privat-Bank from 1932; stamp imprint from 1940 with the name of Commerzbank

=== Type ===
Commerzbank is a German public limited company (Aktiengesellschaft). Its business purpose includes the "operation of banking and financial services of all kinds". Commerzbank is listed by the Federal Financial Supervisory Authority (BaFin) as a CRR credit institution. Since the introduction of European banking supervision, it has been monitored by the European Central Bank (ECB). Commerzbank is currently not classified as a globally systemically important financial institution.

=== Listing ===
The bank's share capital is divided into approximately 1.25 billion bearer shares with a nominal value of one euro each. The shares are traded on the Frankfurt Stock Exchange and through the Xetra trading venue and are listed in the DAX. According to its articles of association, Commerzbank's annual general meeting takes place at the company's headquarters, at another German stock exchange location, or in a German city with more than 250,000 inhabitants. Due to the global coronavirus pandemic in 2020, the bank successfully held digital meetings, like many other companies.

The consolidated financial statements include all companies in which Commerzbank is directly or indirectly involved. The most important domestic subsidiary is the fully owned subsidiary Commerz Real. Internationally, there are four major subsidiaries, including the Polish mBank. Other participations include the advertising agency Neugelb Studios and the innovation unit Neosfer, which strategically invests in fintechs, among other things. Additionally, Commerzbank participates in young companies related to the financial sector through venture capital funds.

=== Management ===
==== Board of Managing Directors ====
- Bettina Orlopp (chairwoman and chief executive officer)
- Michael Kotzbauer (Deputy Chief Executive Officer, Corporate Clients)
- Sabine Mlnarsky (Group Human Resources, Group Organisation & Security)
- Thomas Schaufler (Private and Small-Business Customers)
- Carsten Schmitt (Chief Financial Officer)
- Bernhard Spalt (Risk Management)
- Christiane Vorspel (Chief Operating Officer)

Former chief executives include Klaus-Peter Müller, Martin Blessing, and Martin Zielke.

==== Supervisory Board ====
The supervisory board advises the management and supervises the conduct of its business. It is made up of equal numbers of representatives of the shareholders. The supervisory board has 20 members; its chairman is Jens Weidmann, his deputy is Sascha Uebel.

Former chairs include Klaus-Peter Müller and Stefan Schmittmann.

=== Shareholder structure ===
As of 23 May 2026

| Shareholder | % of voting rights (shares) | % of voting rights (instruments) |
|---|---|---|
| UniCredit | 26.77% | 12.10% |
| German government | 12.11% | 0.00% |
| BlackRock | 4.86% | 0.27% |
| Commerzbank (Buyback) | 4.14% | 0.00% |
| Nomura Holdings | 2.24% | 5.88% |
| Citigroup | 1.47% | 3.65% |
| Morgan Stanley | 0.11% | 5.20% |
| Jefferies Financial Group | 0.00% | 11.09% |

As of May 2026, UniCredit is the largest single shareholder in Commerzbank, holding a total stake of approximately 38.87% when combining shares and voting rights through instruments. The Federal Republic of Germany, through the Special Fund for Financial Market Stabilization (SoFFin), has significantly reduced its stake to 12.11% following a series of share sales since 2024. Other major institutional investors include BlackRock, Nomura Holdings, Citigroup, Morgan Stanley, and Jefferies Financial Group, each holding varying interests through shares and financial instruments. About 4.14% of Commerzbank shares are currently held as treasury shares following a share buyback program.

=== Finances ===
| Year | 2016 | 2017 | 2018 | 2019 | 2020 | 2021 | 2022 | 2023 | 2024 | 2025 |
|---|---|---|---|---|---|---|---|---|---|---|
| Operating profit (€ millions) | 1,399 | 1,303 | 1,245 | 1,258 | –233 | 1,183 | 2,099 | 3,421 | 3,837 | 4,509 |
| Consolidated profit (€ millions) | 279 | 156 | 865 | 644 | –2,918 | 291 | 1,245 | 2,030 | 2,465 | 2,625 |
| Total Assets (€ billions) | 480.5 | 452.5 | 462.4 | 463.6 | 506.9 | 473.0 | 477.4 | 517.2 | 554.6 | 590.1 |
| Employees | 49,941 | 49,417 | 49,410 | 48,512 | 47,718 | 40,181 | 37,852 | 38,565 | 39,040 | 39,867 |

=== Memberships ===
Commerzbank is a member of the Association of German Banks (BdB) and the Employers' Association of Private Banking (AGV Banken). It is also active in the Federal Association of Small and Medium-Sized Enterprises (BVMW), the American Chamber of Commerce in Germany (AmCham), the Arab-German Chamber of Commerce and Industry (Ghorfa), the Asia-Pacific Committee of German Business (APA), and the Africa Association of German Business (AV). Commerzbank is a member of the Economic Advisory Board of CDU/CSU and the Economic Forum of the SPD. It maintains contact with all democratic parties in Germany.

== Services ==
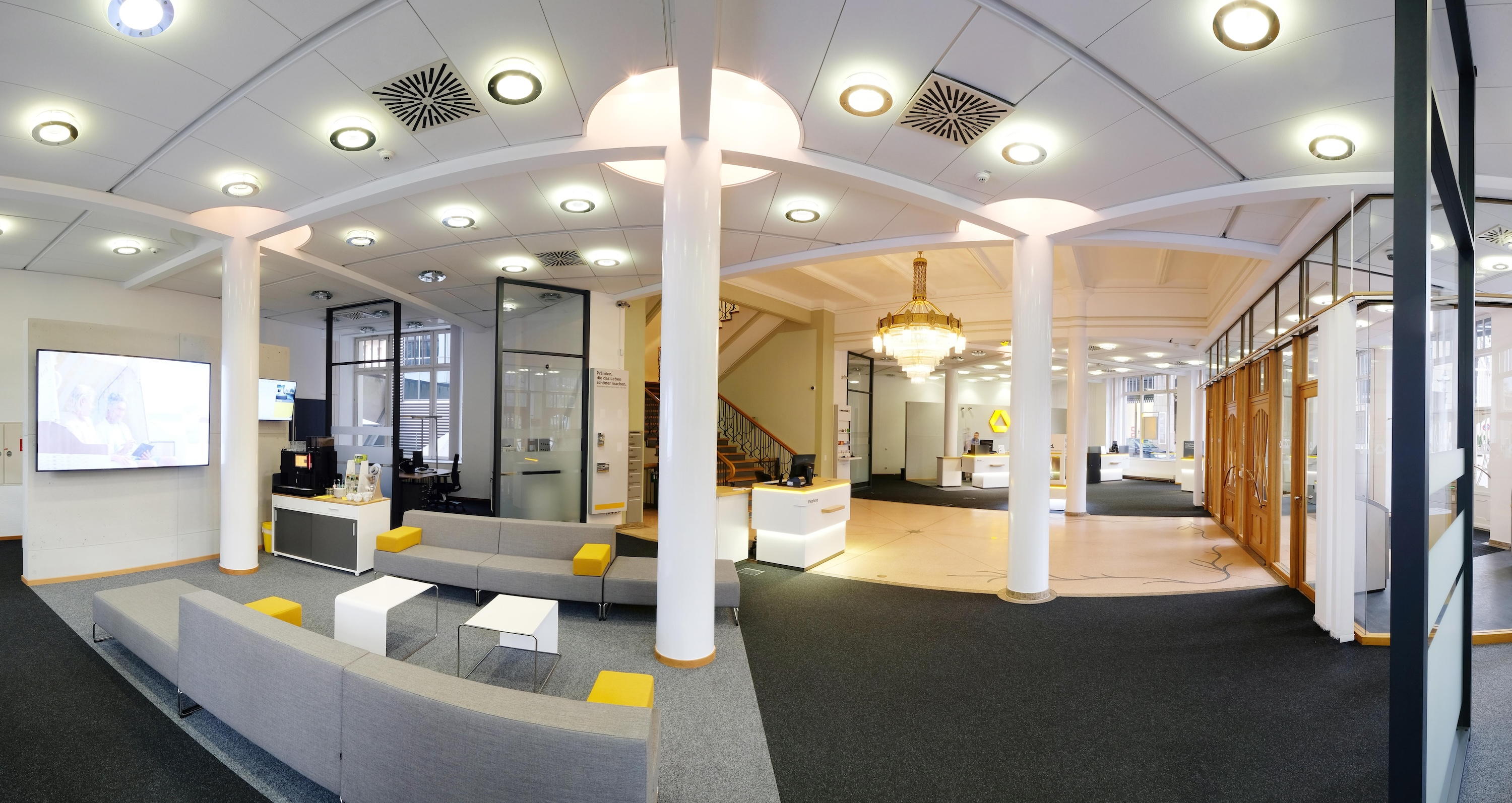
Interior view of the Commerzbank branch in Leipzig (2017)

=== Private and business customers ===
Commerzbank is one of the market leaders for private and entrepreneurial customers in Germany. It offers a wide range of products for payment transactions, securities trading, investment and financing, and corresponding advice through various channels (online and offline). With its 'free checking account', the bank secured many customers. This offer continues to this day. Real estate and corporate loans are realized in partnership with the Kreditanstalt für Wiederaufbau (KfW).

Commerzbank offers corporate clients a variety of financial products and services. These include traditional products such as accounts, loans, and payment transactions. In addition, the bank supports companies in structuring capital measures, such as issuing shares and bonds. Another crucial area is international business. The bank provides services for German and international companies. Examples include foreign exchange businesses and solutions for risk management. Commerzbank finances around one-third of German foreign trade, making it a leader among the major German banks.

=== Headquarters and locations ===
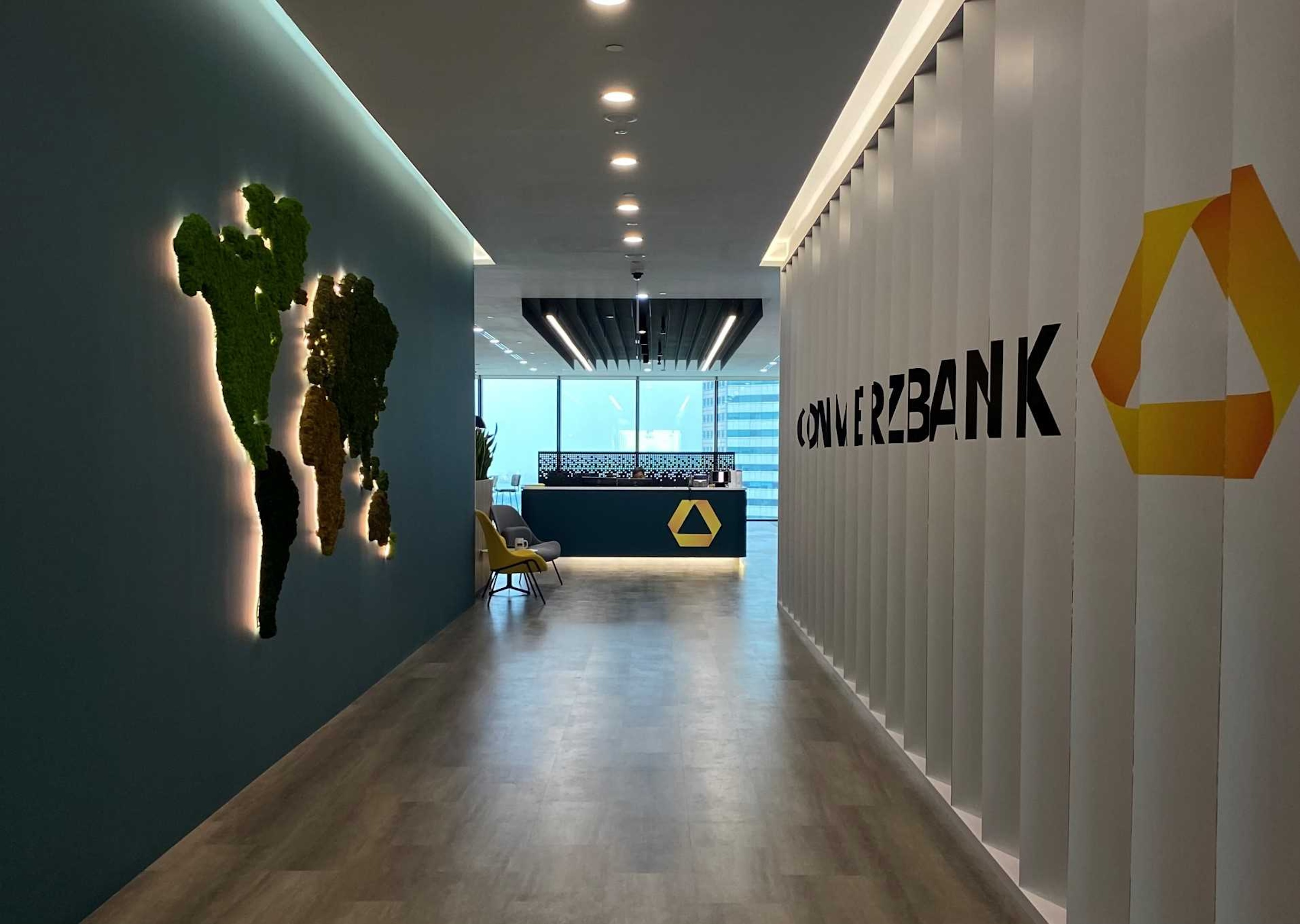
Entrance to Commerzbank in Singapore

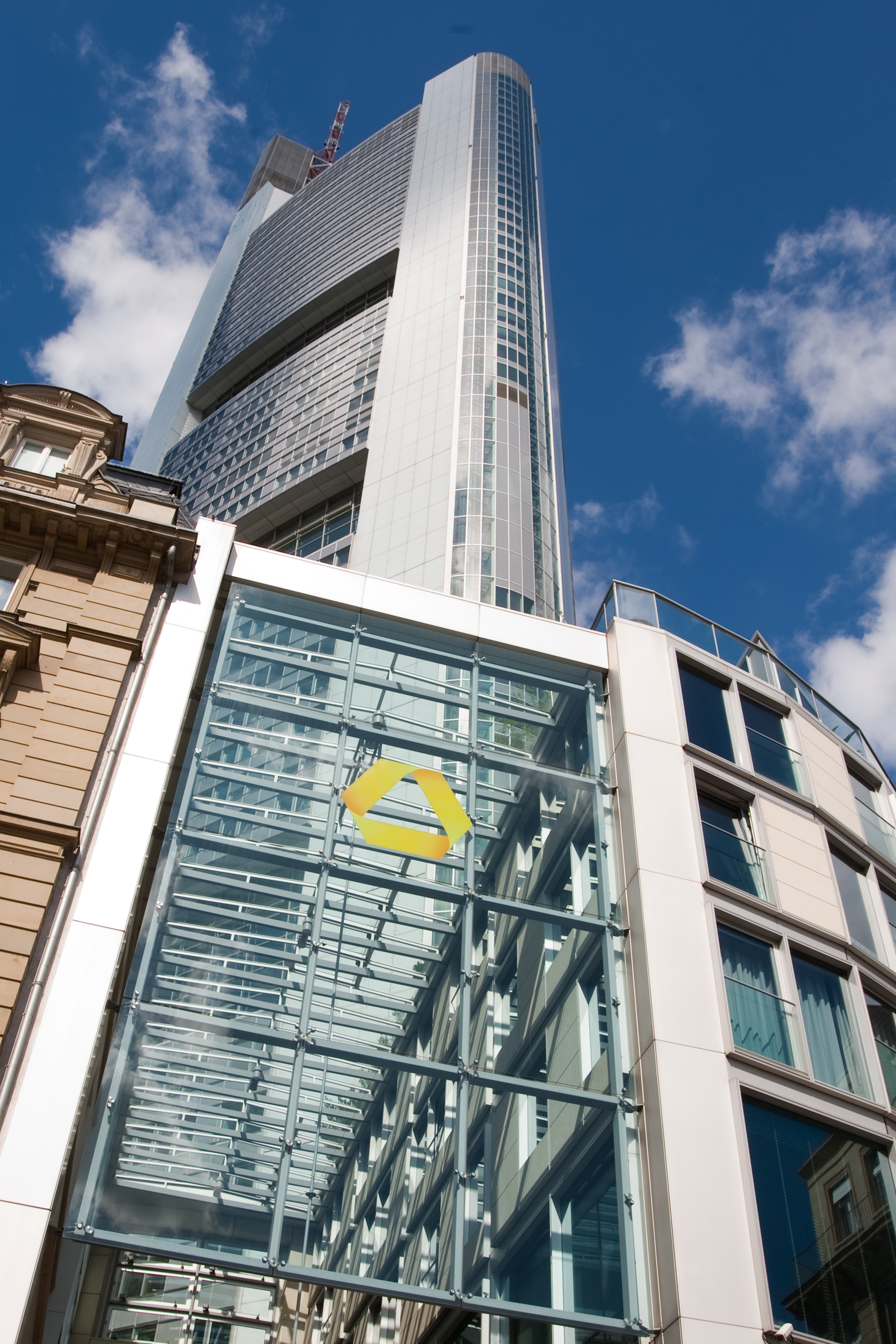
Commerzbank Tower, current headquarters of the Group (2010)

With around 400 branches, Commerzbank operates a nationwide branch network in Germany. It includes both larger and smaller locations, offering a diversified range of services. The headquarters and major staff departments of the group are located in the Commerzbank Tower, Frankfurt am Main. Additionally, there is a representative office at Pariser Platz in Berlin and a liaison office in Brussels. There are also other international locations, such as New York City and Singapore.

Commerzbank has Digital Technology Centres in Prague, Łódź and Sofia. Its Prague IT operations began in 2005 and were expanded in 2015 with the establishment of a local branch of Commerz Systems, the bank's IT subsidiary. The Czech centre also has an office in Brno, with around 600 IT specialists working across both locations.

== Commerzbank brand ==
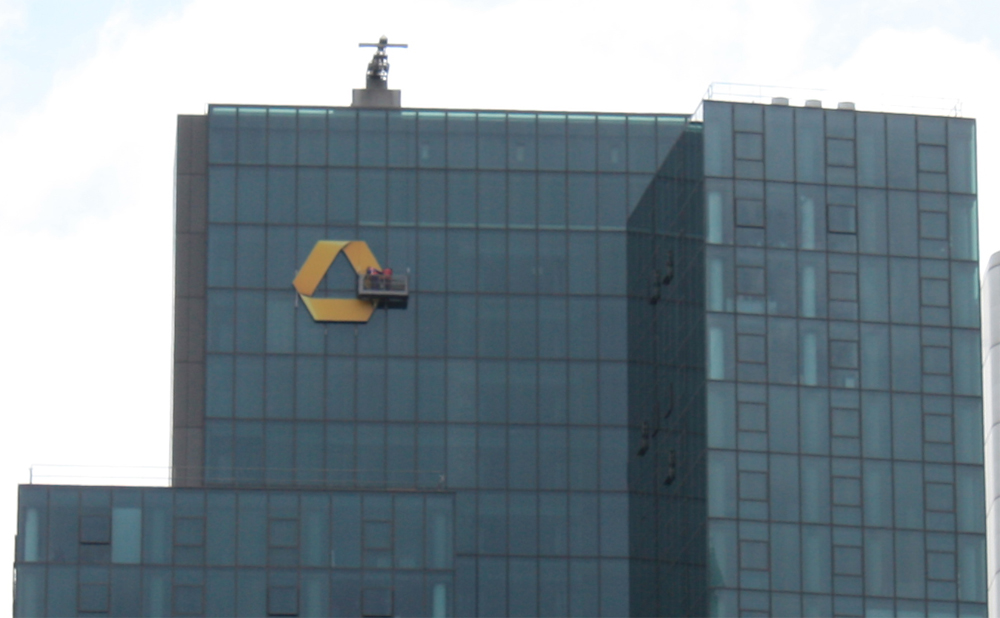
Renewal of the logo on the old 'Gallileo' high-rise building of Dresdner Bank in Frankfurt am Main (2010)

Early logos of Commerzbank featured the abbreviations CDB and CPB. From the 1920s, these were incorporated into the corporate image. In 1940, a logo with a 'C' and Mercury wings was introduced. This was followed in 1972 by the "Quatre Vents" logo, inspired by a wind rose. After the takeover of Dresdner Bank in 2009, Commerzbank presented a new logo with the name in a new font, the color yellow, and a three-dimensional ribbon.

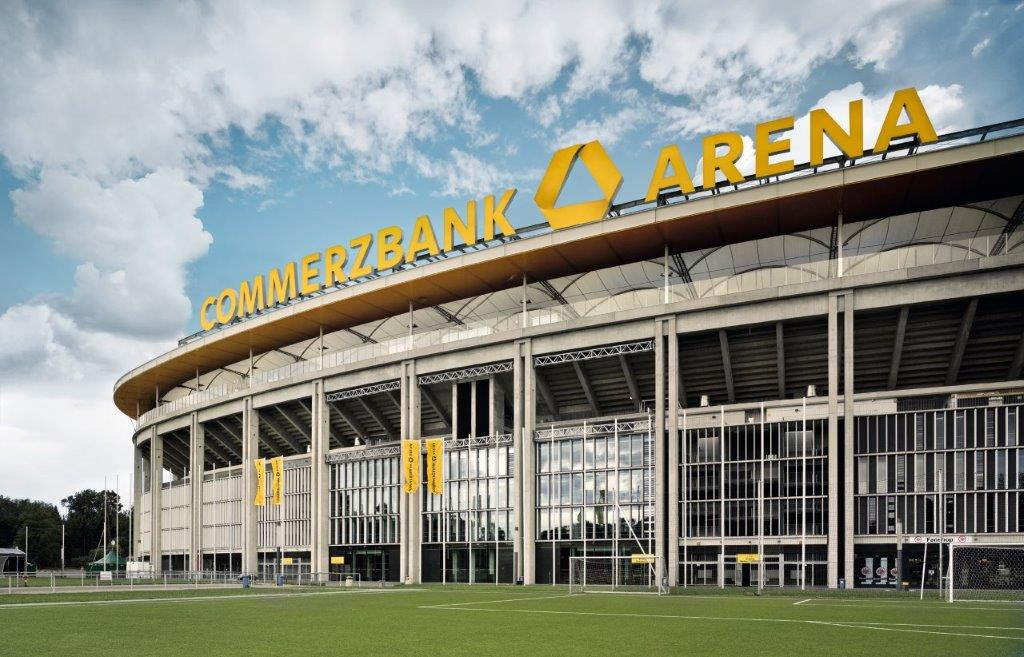
Exterior view of the former Commerzbank Arena (originally named Waldstadion, today known as the Deutsche Bank Park for sponsorship reasons)

The Waldstadion had been named "Commerzbank Arena". Since 2008, Commerzbank has been a partner of the German Football Association (DFB). Until 2021, the bank was a partner of the men's national team, but has focused on the women's national team since then. Commerzbank produced an advertising campaign for the 2019 Women's World Cup with the national team, which gained high attention nationally and internationally.

== Climate change ==
Commerzbank supports the goal defined in the Paris Agreement to limit global warming to less than two degrees Celsius compared to pre-industrial levels. The bank signed the United Nations Global Compact in 2006 and was among the first signatories of the Principles for Responsible Banking developed in 2019. In the 1980s, Commerzbank began financing projects in renewable energy. Over the years, this commitment was steadily expanded; by May 2026, the total volume of Green Bonds issued by Commerzbank reached 2.85 billion euros In addition, Commerzbank issues sustainable bonds, known as Green Bonds.

Since 2013, only electricity from renewable sources has been used in Germany. In 2016, Commerzbank adopted a binding policy on coal financing. This policy was further developed in 2022 into a guideline for transactions and customer relationships related to fossil fuels, now regulating business and relationships involving coal, oil, and gas. The policy sets explicit exclusions and restrictions. Commerzbank relies on the scientific findings and methods of the Science Based Targets Initiative (SBTi) to steer its portfolios towards carbon neutrality, which the bank joined in 2022. In 2023, the interim reduction targets for 2030 were validated, making Commerzbank the first German bank with the corresponding certification. On a national level, Commerzbank supports the German Sustainability Code (DNK) and has signed the climate agreement of the German financial sector. The bank has established an operational environmental management system to reduce direct and indirect greenhouse gas emissions.

== Controversies ==
In 2012, the U.S. Federal Reserve Board (FRB), which regulates foreign banking operations in the United States, required Commerzbank and its New York branch to rectify deficiencies in their compliance program and anti-money laundering processes. The enforcement actions have since been lifted. US authorities accused Commerzbank of violating sanctions in its business dealings with partners in countries such as Iran, Sudan, North Korea, Myanmar and Cuba.

In 2015, this led to a billion-dollar fine to be paid by the Commerzbank. Reasons included deficiencies in anti-money laundering measures revealed concerning fraud involving the Japanese Olympus Corporation. In February 2015, tax investigators and prosecutors searched Commerzbank's headquarters on suspicion of aiding and abetting tax evasion related to its Luxembourg subsidiary Commerzbank International and the Panamanian legal service firm Mossack Fonseca. In 2016, a research consortium published an analysis of cum-cum transactions involving Commerzbank.

That same year, the bank decided to stop conducting tax-motivated cum-cum transactions, as they were no longer socially acceptable. In 2017, investigations by the Frankfurt am Main Public Prosecutor's Office and in 2019 by the Cologne Public Prosecutor's Office were disclosed in connection with cum-ex transactions. In June 2020, the Financial Conduct Authority (FCA) imposed a fine of 38 million pounds (€42 million) on Commerzbank for failing to combat money laundering again. According to the authority, Commerzbank could not take adequate steps to address the deficiencies.

== See also ==
- Comdirect Bank
- mBank
- List of banks in the euro area
- List of banks in Germany
