= Stefan Schmittmann =

German manager (born 1956)

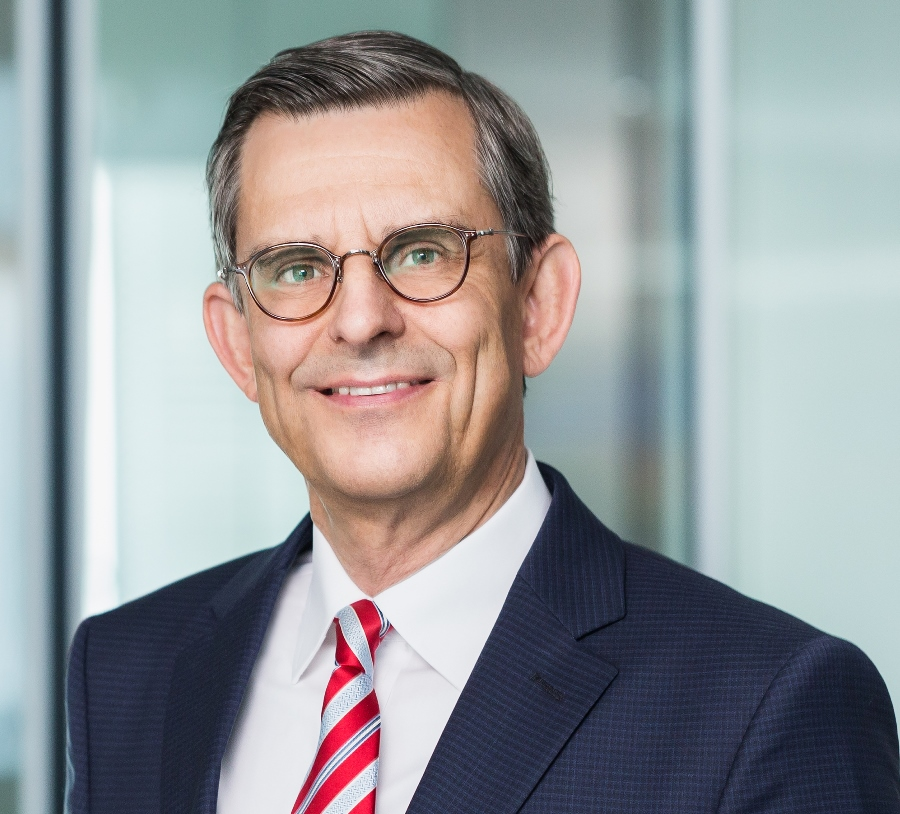
- Stefan Schmittmann (2018)
- Born: November 8, 1956 (age 69); Munich, Bavaria, Germany
- Education: University of St. Gallen
- Occupation: Banker
- Known for: Chairman of the Supervisory Board of Commerzbank

Stefan Schmittmann (born November 8, 1956) is a German manager. He has been chairman of the supervisory board of Commerzbank since May 2018.

== Education ==
Schmittmann was born on November 8, 1956, in Munich, Germany. From 1976 to 1981, Schmittmann studied business administration at the University of St. Gallen, Switzerland. From 1981 to 1986, he did his post-graduate studies and completed them as a doctorate in business administration.

== Career ==
Schmittmann began his career as research assistant at the University of St. Gallen. In 1986, he joined the Bayerische Vereinsbank, most recently as member of the divisional board and chief credit risk officer. From 2004 to 2005, Schmittmann was spokesman of the board of managing directors of the Vereins- und Westbank, a subsidiary of the Hypo- und Vereinsbank.

After some years in leading management and board positions at the Hypo- und Vereinsbank, Schmittmann finally joined Commerzbank in 2008. He became chief risk officer and member of the board of managing directors. Schmittmann was particularly responsible for Eurohypo, a real estate company that has been acquired by Commerzbank.

Schmittmann left the board of managing directors of Commerzbank by the end of 2015. In May 2018, he was elected to the supervisory board of Commerzbank, where he replaced Klaus-Peter Müller as chairman.

== Other activities ==
=== Corporate boards ===
- HETA Asset Resolution, Deputy Chair of the Supervisory Board
- Schaltbau Group, Member of the Supervisory Board (-2016)

=== Non-profit organizations ===
- Federal Academy for Security Policy (BAKS), Member of the Advisory Board
- Robert Koch Foundation, Member of the Board of Directors
