= Treaty Establishing a Monetary, Economic and Social Union between the German Democratic Republic and the Federal Republic of Germany =

The Treaty Establishing a Monetary, Economic and Social Union between the German Democratic Republic and the Federal Republic of Germany (German: Vertrag über die Schaffung einer Währungs-, Wirtschafts- und Sozialunion zwischen der Deutschen Demokratischen Republik und der Bundesrepublik Deutschland) was a treaty signed on 18 May 1990 between the German Democratic Republic and the Federal Republic of Germany, as part of the process of German reunification. Coming into force on 1 July 1990, the treaty replaced the East German mark with the Deutsche Mark as East Germany's official currency.

== Background ==
By the late 1980s, East Germany was in an economic crisis. Its centrally planned economy struggled due to inefficiencies, foreign debt, and growing deficits. By the end of 1989, East Germany's debt had reached 49 billion East German Marks, and the state was unable to sustain economic growth. The crisis, coupled with increasing emigration to the West, put immense pressure on the government to reform.

The process of economic integration was initiated in the wake of East Germany's first free elections, which resulted in a victory for the Alliance for Germany, a coalition of pro-reunification parties led by the Christian Democratic Union (CDU). This government, under Lothar de Maizière, quickly engaged in negotiations with West Germany on currency and economic unification.

== Economic Consequences ==
The introduction of the Deutsche Mark was widely welcomed, but it had significant economic repercussions. Many East German businesses, accustomed to operating under a planned economy, struggled to compete in the new market-driven system. The sudden shift led to mass factory closures and rising unemployment.

The Treuhandanstalt (Trust Agency), established on March 1, 1990, was tasked with privatizing nearly 8,000 state-owned enterprises, which employed four million people. However, many businesses were sold for far less than their value or failed to attract investors, leading to accusations of mismanagement and corruption.
