= Christian Sewing =

German banker (born 1970)

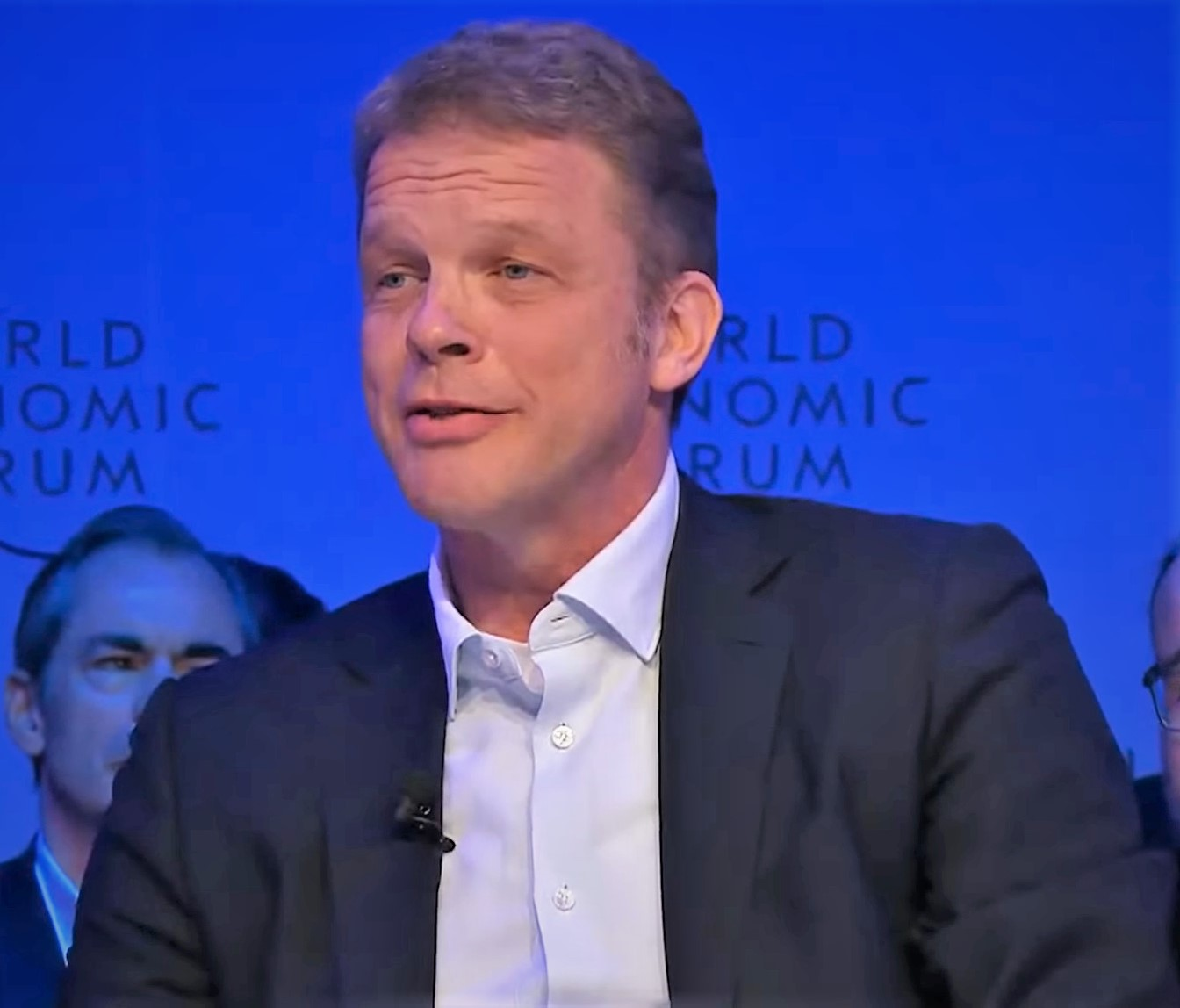
- Sewing in 2020
- Born: 24 April 1970 (age 56); Bünde, Germany
- Education: Frankfurt School of Finance & Management
- Occupations: Banker, business executive
- Title: CEO of Deutsche Bank
- Children: 4

Christian Sewing (German pronunciation: ['krɪsti̯an 'ze:vɪŋ]; born 24 April 1970 in Bünde) is a German banker who is the chief executive officer (CEO) of Deutsche Bank. He has been a member of the management board since January 2015, and CEO since April 2018..

== Early life ==
Sewing was born on 24 April 1970. He earned his Abitur in 1989. He completed an apprenticeship programme at Deutsche Bank in Bielefeld, graduating with a banking qualification from the Chamber of Industry and Commerce in 1991. He then studied business administration at the Frankfurt School of Finance & Management, in Frankfurt.

== Career ==
Sewing first worked in the branches of Deutsche Bank as a 19-year-old trainee in Bielefeld and Hamburg, then as a junior corporate client advisor in Toronto, as Chief Credit Officer in Japan, and six years as a risk manager in London. From 2005 until 2007, Sewing was a member of the management board of Deutsche Genossenschafts-Hypothekenbank.

From 2010 to 2012, he was chief credit officer. He has worked in Frankfurt, London, Singapore, Tokyo and Toronto. From 2012 to 2013, he was deputy chief risk officer. Sewing was head of group audit from June 2013 to February 2015, prior to which he held a number of management positions in risk management. From January 2016, Sewing oversaw Deutsche Bank's private and commercial banking division, which includes the lender's network of German retail branches, but has a low profile outside of Germany. He earned 2.9 million euros for 2017.

On 8 April 2018, Sewing became CEO at Deutsche Bank, replacing John Cryan. That year, he led Deutsche Bank to its first profit in four years and launched talks with Commerzbank on a potential merger. After his first year, his 7 million euro compensation made him one of the best paid chief executives in European banking. As of September, Christian will spend 15% of his monthly net salary buying the German lender's shares as part of his efforts to revive the bank's profitability.

Sewing was the head of Deutsche Bank's audit division during Deutsche Bank's $10 billion money-laundering scandal involving its Moscow operations. The auditing division gave its Moscow office a clean bill of health, despite serious irregularities. According to the terms of Deutsche Bank's settlement with the SEC, Sewing must "annually certify that the German lender is adhering to a recent settlement in which U.S. authorities fined the firm for violating swaps reporting rules." This change could hold Sewing criminally liable for future violations by the bank.

In 2022, under the orders of Deutsche Bank's supervisory board, Sewing and 10% of the senior staff took an overall €1 million reduction in pay due to the bank's missing targets. Sewing received a €145,000 cut to his bonus, as the supervisory board, led by Alexander Wynaendts, revealed that the bank met just 64% of its government, social, and governance targets.

== Other activities ==
=== Government agencies ===
- Monetary Authority of Singapore (MAS), Member of the International Advisory Panel (since 2018)

=== Corporate boards ===
- Deutsche Postbank, Member of the supervisory board (since 2012)

=== Non-profit organizations ===
- Federation of German Industries (BDI), Member of the Presidium (2017–2018)
- Association of German Banks (BdB), Member of the Board of Directors, President (since 2021)
- Institute of International Finance (IIF), Member of the Board
- Working Group of Protestant Businesses (AEU), Member of the Board of Trustees
- Stifterverband für die Deutsche Wissenschaft, Member of the Board

== Personal life ==
Sewing is a passionate tennis player. He is married and has four children.
