= Deutsche Bank =

German banking and financial services company

Deutsche Bank AG

- Deutsche Bank Twin Towers in Frankfurt, Germany
- Type: Public company
- Traded as: FWB: DBK; NYSE: DB; DAX component
- ISIN: DE0005140008
- Industry: Financial services
- Predecessor: Deutsche Unionbank; Flick Concern; Handel-Maatschappij H. Albert de Bary & Co; Banco Transatlántico; Norddeutsche Bank
- Founded: 10 March 1870; 156 years ago
- Founders: Ludwig Bamberger; Adelbert Delbrück
- Headquarters: Deutsche Bank Twin Towers, Frankfurt, Germany
- Key people: Christian Sewing (CEO); Alexander Wynaendts (chairman of supervisory board)
- Products: Asset management; Banking; Commodities; Credit cards; Equities trading; Insurance; Investment management; Mortgage loans; Private equity; Wealth management
- Revenue: ▲€32.1 billion (2025)
- Operating income: ▲€9.7 billion (2025)
- Net income: ▲€7.1 billion (2025)
- Total assets: ▲€1,435 billion (2025)
- Total equity: ▲€67 billion (2025)
- Number of employees: 89,879 (2025)
- Website: db.com

Deutsche Bank AG (Note: AG stands for Aktiengesellschaft, which means "joint-stock company".) (German pronunciation: [ˈdɔʏtʃə ˈbaŋk ʔaːˈɡeː], lit. 'German Bank') is a German multinational banking institution headquartered in Frankfurt, Germany. It is dual-listed on the Frankfurt Stock Exchange and the New York Stock Exchange.

Deutsche Bank was founded in 1870 in Berlin. From 1929 to 1937, following its merger with Disconto-Gesellschaft, it was known as Deutsche Bank und Disconto-Gesellschaft or DeDi-Bank. Other transformative acquisitions have included those of Mendelssohn & Co. in 1938, Morgan Grenfell in 1990, Bankers Trust in 1998, and Deutsche Postbank in 2010.

As of 2018, the bank's network spanned 58 countries with a large presence in Europe, the Americas, and Asia. It is a component of the DAX stock market index and is often referred to as the largest German banking institution, with Deutsche Bank holding the majority stake in DWS Group for combined assets of 2.2 trillion euros, rivaling even Sparkassen-Finanzgruppe in terms of combined assets, forming Europe's 4th biggest asset management firm. According to S&P Global's April 2026 report, Deutsche is Europe's eighth largest bank by assets, with $1.684 trillion in assets.

Deutsche Bank has been designated a global systemically important bank by the Financial Stability Board since 2011. It has been designated as a Significant Institution since the entry into force of European Banking Supervision in late 2014, and as a consequence is directly supervised by the European Central Bank.

According to a 2020 article in the New Yorker, Deutsche Bank had long had an "abject" reputation among major banks, as it has been involved in major scandals across various issue areas, including money laundering, sanctions evasion, fraud, and forming a close business relationship with disgraced sex offender Jeffrey Epstein after JPMorgan cut him off in 2013.

== History ==
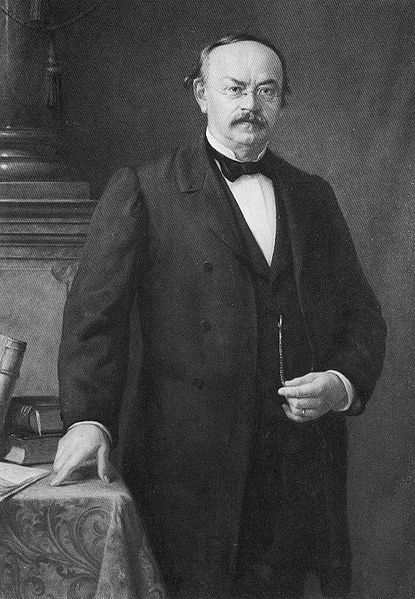
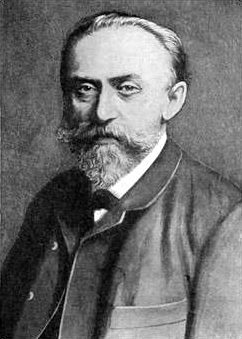
Adelbert Delbrück (left) and Ludwig Bamberger (right) are often referred to as the key founders of Deutsche Bank.

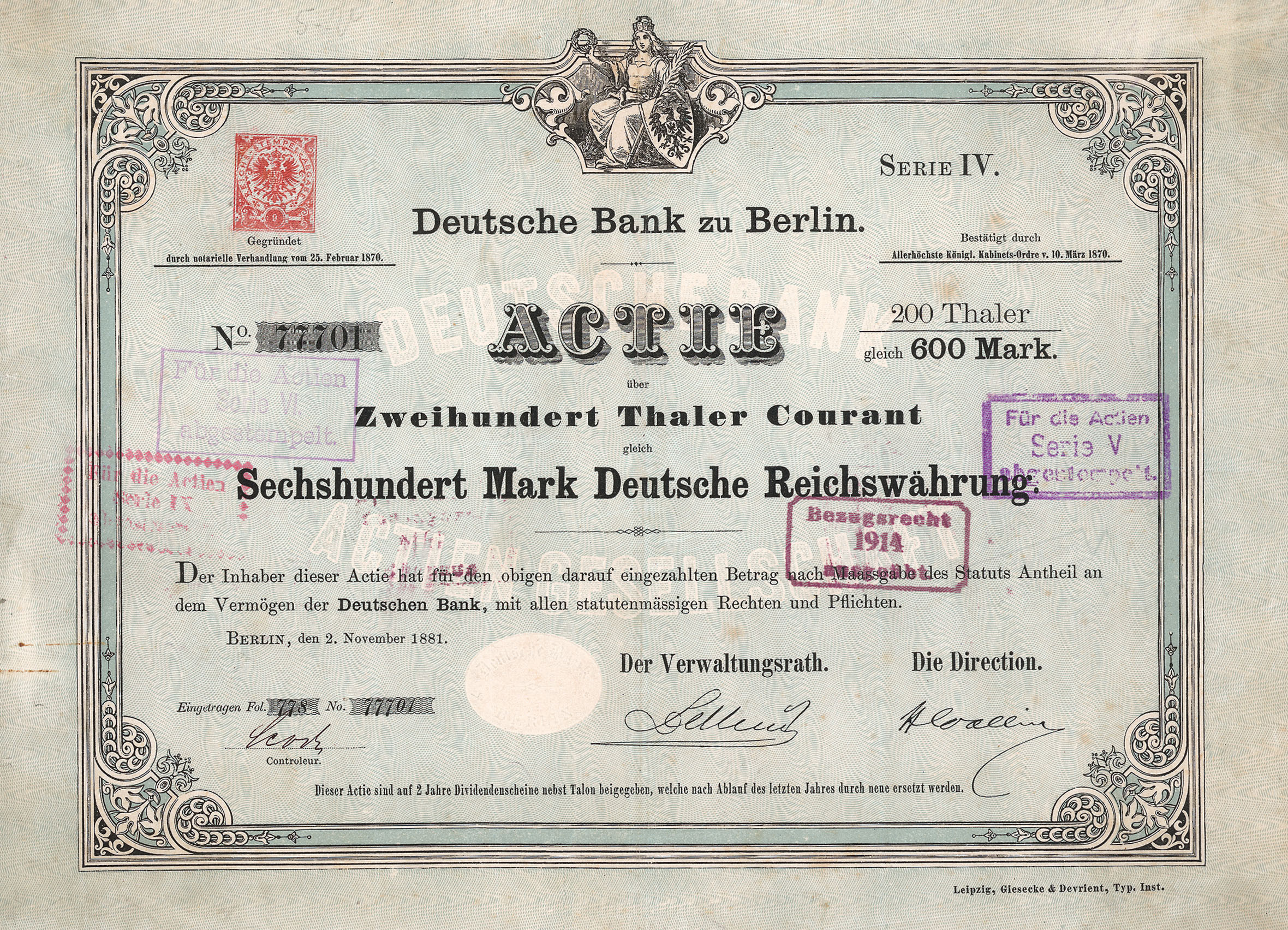
Share of the Deutsche Bank, issued 2 November 1881

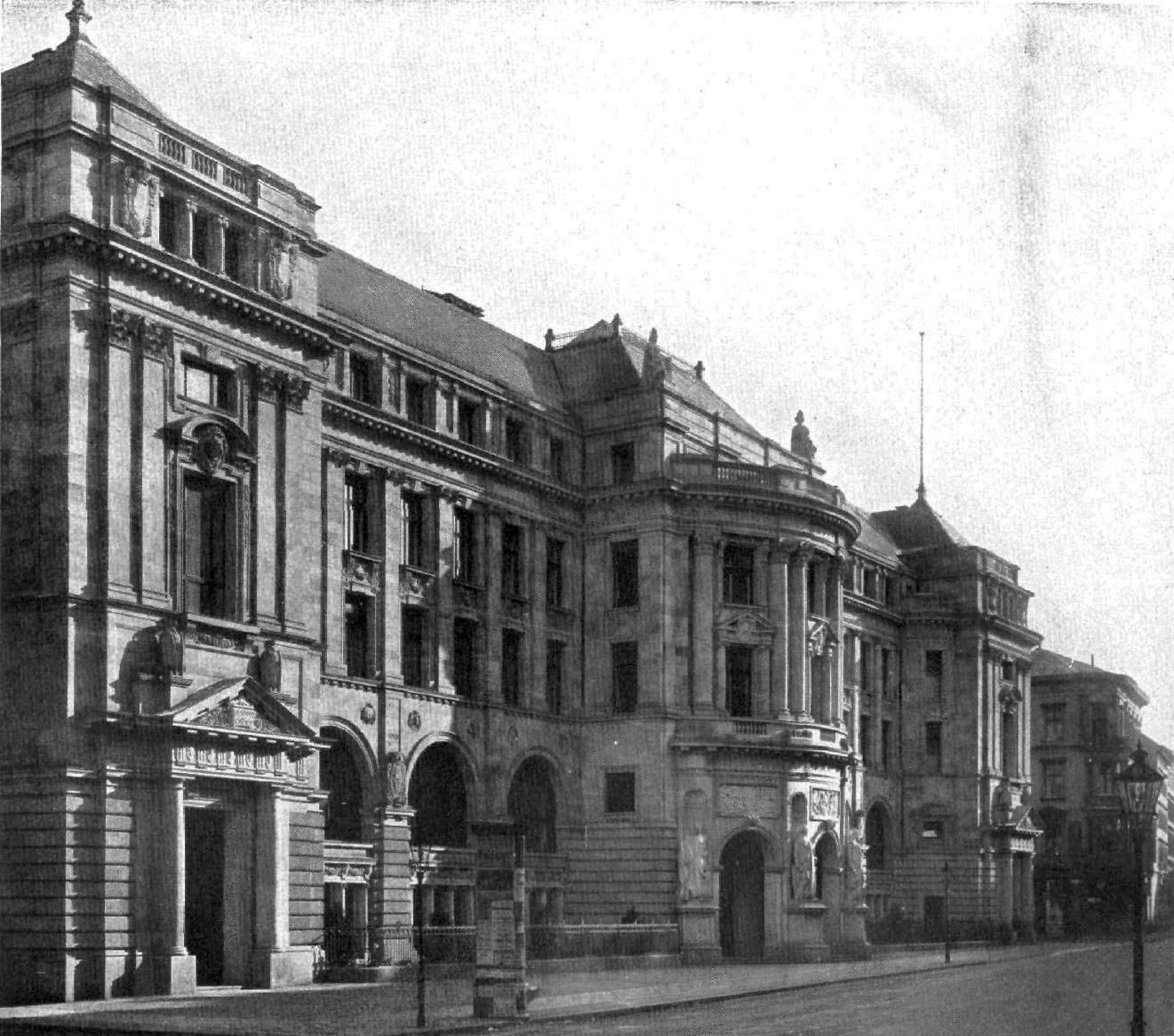
Former Deutsche Bank headquarters on Mauerstrasse 25–28 in Berlin, photographed in 1909

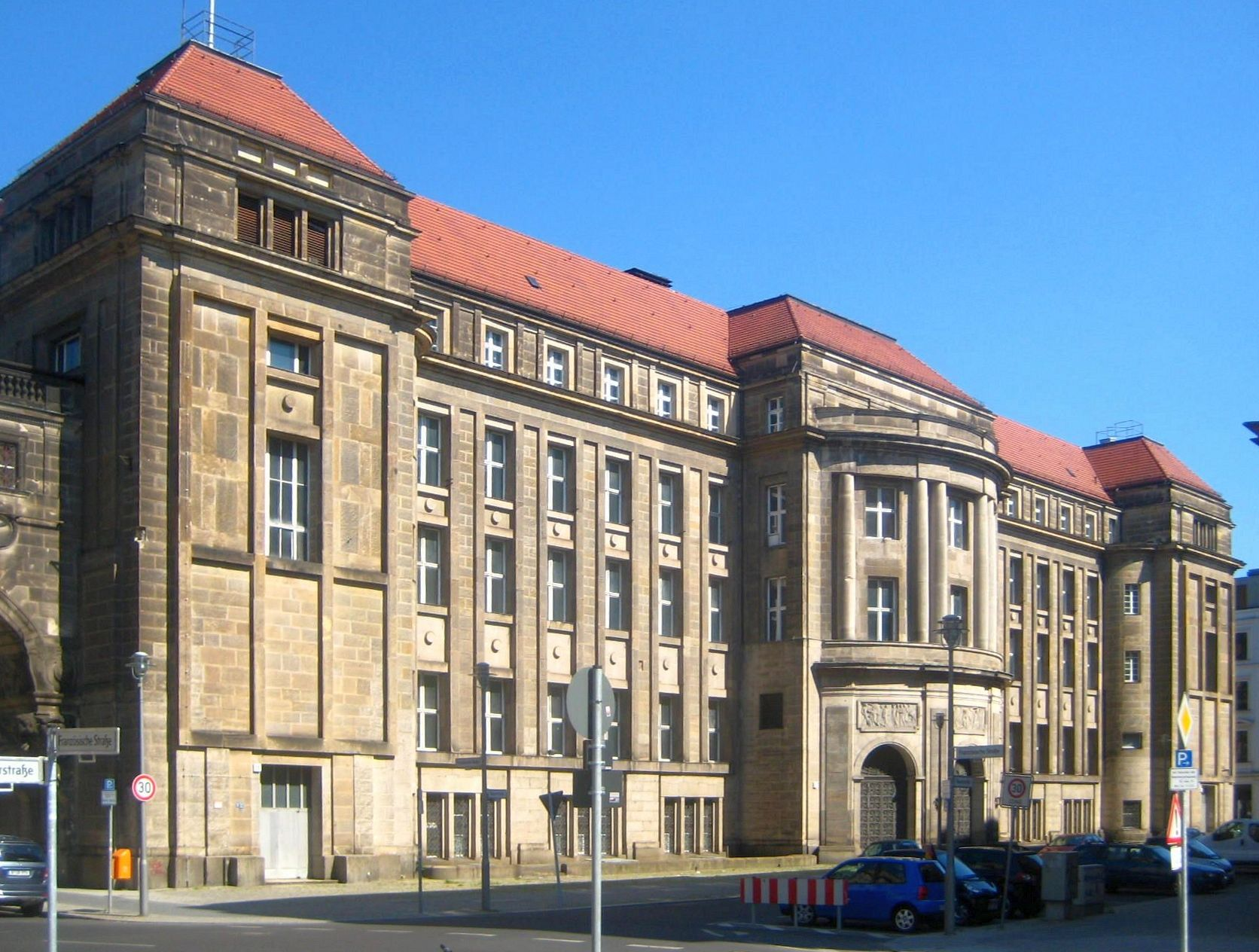
The same building in 2010, following partial rebuilding after World War II

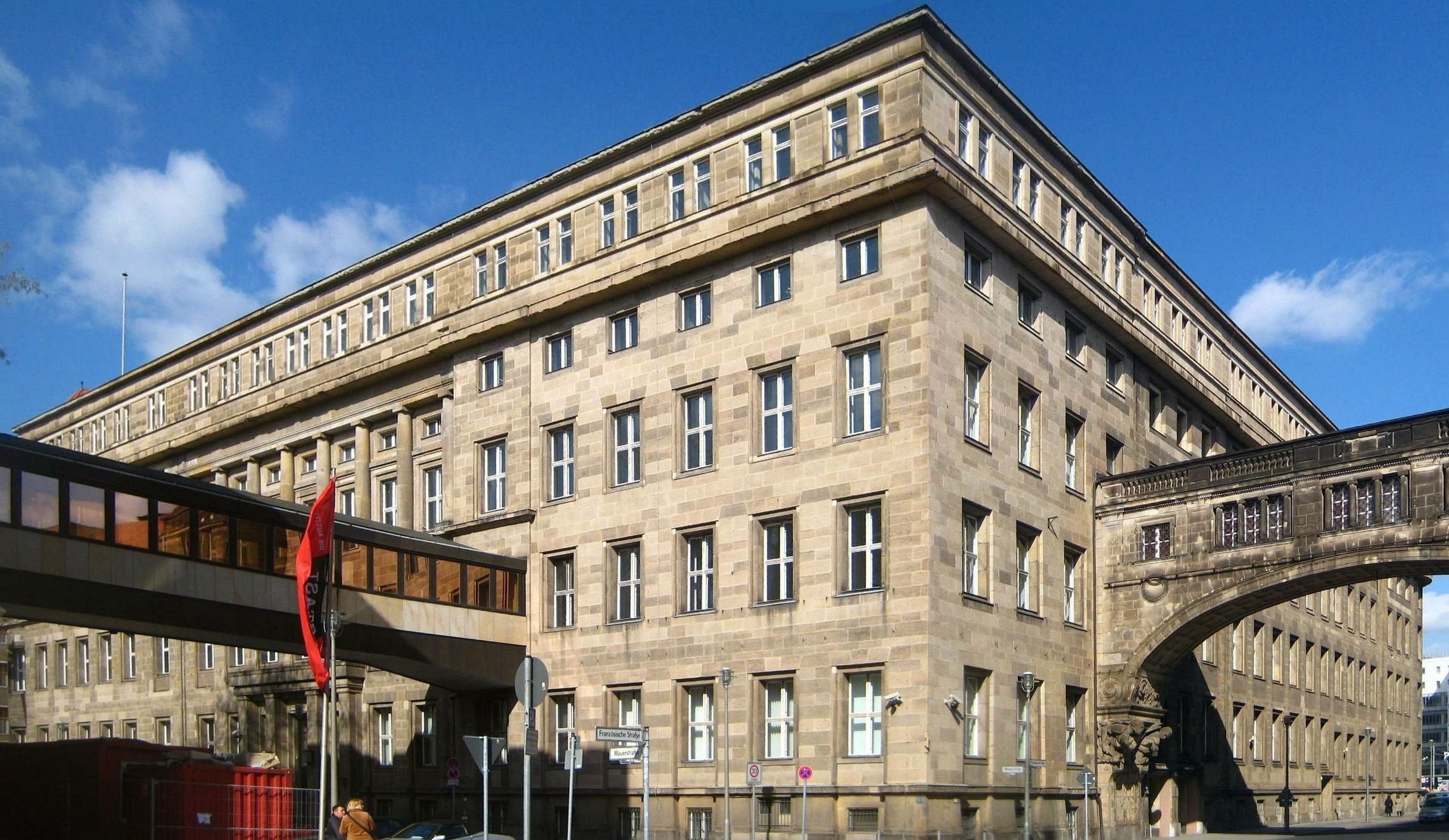
Another view of Deutsche Bank's former head office complex, corner of Mauerstrasse and Französische Strasse

=== 1870–1933 ===
Deutsche Bank was founded in 1870 in Berlin as a specialist bank for financing foreign trade and promoting German exports. It subsequently played a large part in developing Germany's financial services industry, as its business model focused on providing finance to industrial customers. The bank's statute was adopted on 22 January 1870, and on 10 March 1870 the Prussian government granted it a banking license. The statute laid great stress on foreign business:

The object of the company is to transact banking business of all kinds, in particular, to promote and facilitate trade relations between Germany, other European countries and overseas markets.

Prior to the founding of Deutsche Bank, German importers and exporters were dependent upon British and French banking institutions in the world markets—a serious handicap in that German bills were almost unknown in international commerce, generally disliked and subject to a higher rate of a discount than English or French bills.

The founding members were: Hermann Zwicker (Bankhaus Gebr. Schickler, Berlin); Anton Adelssen (Bankhaus Adelssen & Co., Berlin); Adelbert Delbrück (Bankhaus Delbrück, Leo & Co.); Heinrich von Hardt (Hardt & Co., Berlin, New York); Ludwig Bamberger (politician, former chairman of Bischoffsheim, Goldschmidt & Co); Victor Freiherr von Magnus (Bankhaus F. Mart Magnus); Adolph vom Rath (Bankhaus Deichmann & Co., Cologne); Gustav Kutter (Bankhaus Gebrüder Sulzbach, Frankfurt); and Gustav Müller (Württembergische Vereinsbank, Stuttgart). The First directors were Wilhelm Platenius, Georg Siemens, and Hermann Wallich. Georg Siemens was a son of a cousin of Werner von Siemens. The bank initially operated from the first floor of a building at 21 Französische Strasse, then in 1871 moved to premises near the Berlin Stock Exchange, and in 1876 started building its massive head office complex on Mauerstrasse.

The bank's first domestic branches, inaugurated in 1871 and 1872, were opened in Bremen and Hamburg. Its first overseas offices opened in Shanghai and Yokohama in 1872, and London in 1873, followed by South American offices between 1874 and 1886. The branch opening in London, after one failure and another partially successful attempt, was a prime necessity for the establishment of credit for the German trade in what was then the world's money center. Deutsche Bank also took advantage of the Panic of 1873 by taking over a number of banks in liquidation, including the Berlin-based Deutsche Union which had itself consolidated a number of failed banks in the early 1870s.

Major projects in the early years of the bank included the Northern Pacific Railroad in the US and the Baghdad Railway (1888). In Germany, the bank was instrumental in the financing of bond offerings of steel company Krupp (1879) and introduced the chemical company Bayer to the Berlin stock market. The second half of the 1890s saw the beginning of a new period of expansion at Deutsche Bank. The bank formed alliances with large regional banks, giving itself an entry into Germany's main industrial regions. It thus formed community-of-interests partnerships with Bergisch-Märkische Bank in Elberfeld and Schlesischer Bankverein in Breslau, linked to the fast-growing industrial economies of the Rhineland and Silesia respectively; it eventually acquired the two banks in 1914 and 1917 respectively. Joint ventures were symptomatic of the concentration then under way in the German banking industry. For Deutsche Bank, domestic branches of its own were still something of a rarity at the time; the Frankfurt branch, dated from 1886 and the Munich branch from 1892, while further branches were established in 1901 in Dresden and Leipzig.

In 1889, Deutsche Bank participated in the creation of the Deutsch-Asiatische Bank in Shanghai, in 1894, of the Banca Commerciale Italiana in Milan, and in 1898, of the Banque Internationale de Bruxelles. In addition, the bank rapidly perceived the value of specialist institutions for the promotion of foreign business. Gentle pressure from the Foreign Ministry played a part in the establishment of Deutsche Überseeische Bank in 1886 and the stake taken in the newly established Deutsch-Asiatische Bank three years later, but the success of those companies showed that their existence made sound commercial sense. By end-1908, Deutsche was by far the largest German joint-stock bank by total deposits, with a total of 489 million Marks ahead of Dresdner Bank (225 million), Disconto-Gesellschaft (219 million), Darmstädter Bank (109 million) and A. Schaaffhausen'scher Bankverein (72 million). At that time, Deutsche Bank was referred to as one of the four "D-Banks" (all of which had names starting with a D) that dominated German commercial banking, together with Darmstädter Bank, Disconto-Gesellschaft, and Dresdner Bank. On 1 January 1910 it also opened a branch in Brussels, the first establishment of a German bank in Belgium (leaving aside German banks' involvement in the establishment of Banque Internationale de Bruxelles in 1898). In March 1911, it took over the Banque Oury in Liège and renamed it Banque Centrale de Liège, with assistance from the Société Générale de Belgique. The Belgian branch became a conduit for Deutsche Bank's investments in Central Africa.

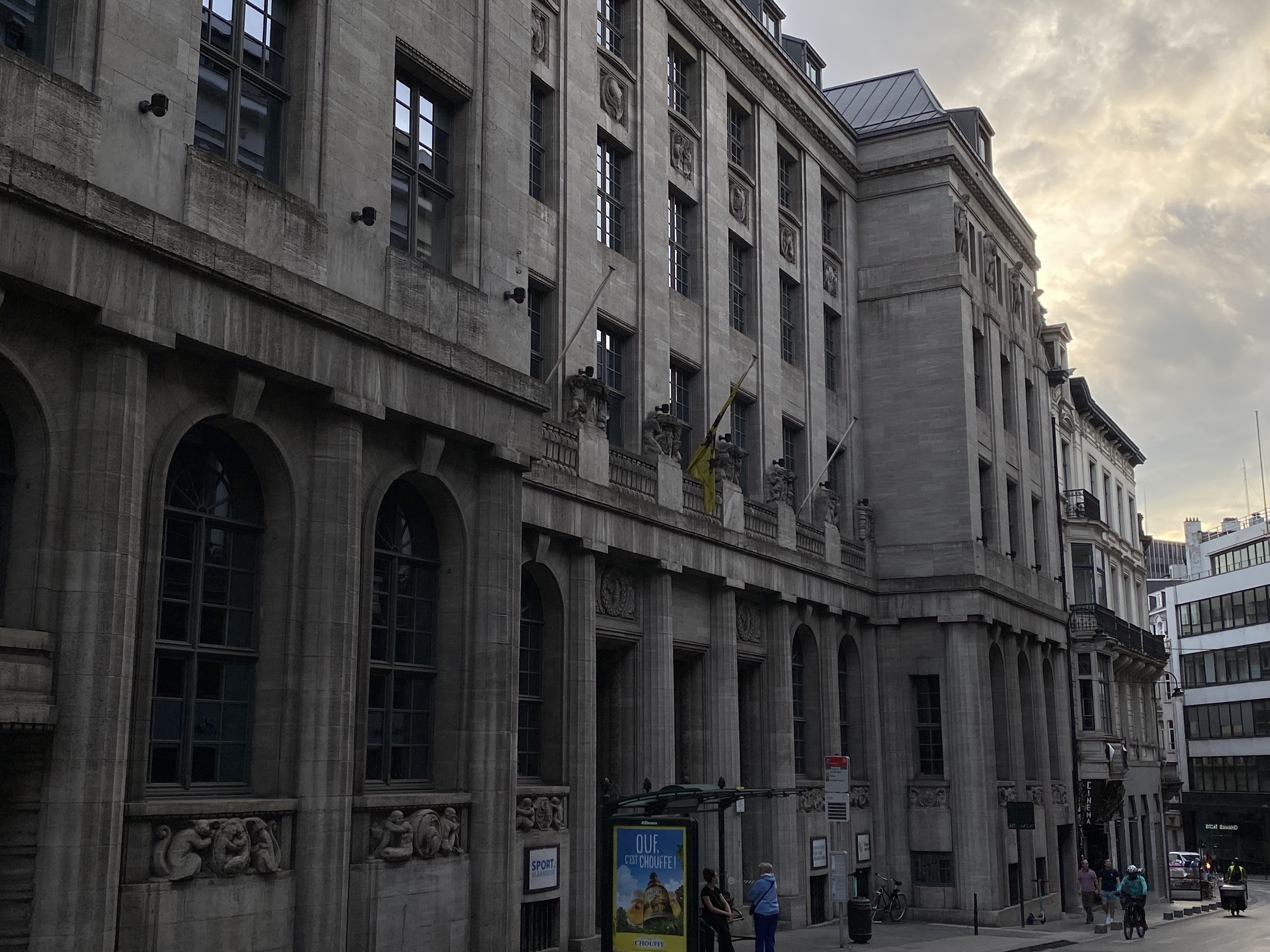
Office building erected 1912 by Deutsche Bank for its branch in Brussels, expropriated following World War I, later head office of Kredietbank

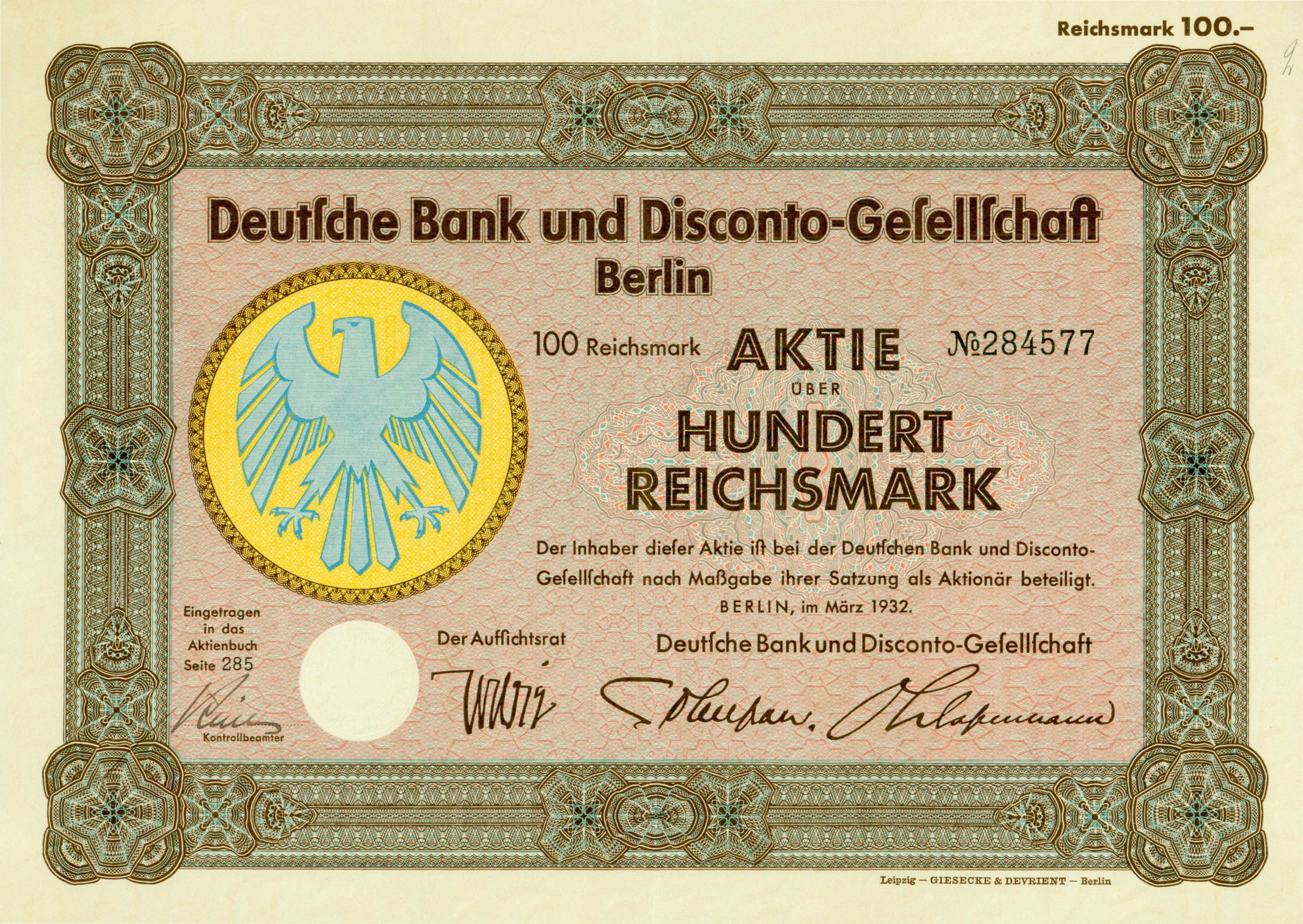
Share of the Deutsche Bank und Disconto-Gesellschaft, issued March 1932

During World War I and in its immediate aftermath, the operations of Deutsche Bank in Brussels, London, Tokyo and Yokohama were expropriated; conversely, its activity in the Ottoman Empire expanded considerably, and it greatly expanded its footprint in Germany. In 1919, the bank purchased the state's share of Universum Film Aktiengesellschaft (UFA). In 1926, the bank assisted in the merger of Daimler and Benz. The bank merged with Disconto-Gesellschaft in 1929 and rebranded itself Deutsche Bank und Disconto-Gesellschaft, sometimes referred to as DeDi-Bank. By 1930, Deutsche Bank & Disconto-Gesellschaft maintained a similar dominant position as before World War I, with 4.8 billion Reichsmarks in total deposits ahead of Danat-Bank (2.4 billion), Dresdner Bank (2.3 billion), Commerz- und Privatbank (1.5 billion), Reichs-Kredit-Gesellschaft (619 million), and Berliner Handels-Gesellschaft (412 million). In the crisis summer of 1931 the Deutsche Golddiskontbank, a subsidiary of the Reichsbank, acquired 35 percent of DeDi-Bank's equity as part of a sector-wide rescue, bringing total government ownership of the bank to 38.5 percent. This did not, however, result in significant government interference in the management of the company, unlike at Dresdner Bank whose capital was near-completely nationalized.

=== 1933–1945 ===
When Adolf Hitler became leader of Germany, Deutsche Bank increasingly became integrated into the Nazi power structures, and fully implemented the Nazi policy of aryanization. In 1934 it dismissed its three Jewish management board members, Oscar Wassermann, Theodor Frank, and Georg Solmssen; in 1938 it dismissed its last Jewish supervisory board member. By the end of 1938, it had been involved as an intermediary and lender in at least 363 cases of expropriation of Jewish-owned businesses. In 1938, it acquired Jewish-controlled German bank Mendelssohn & Co. under duress. Meanwhile, the Nazi government fully re-privatized Deutsche Bank in 1935–1937, largely out of budgetary considerations. Its name changed back to Deutsche Bank in 1937.

While the Nazi policies of financial repression were largely unhelpful to the domestic business of Deutsche and other German commercial banks, its expansionary behavior created opportunities that Deutsche Bank pursued. In 1938 following Hitler's Anschluss of Austria, Deutsche Bank gradually took control of Creditanstalt-Bankverein, the former country's leading bank. On 1938-03-26 the latter was coerced to enter a "friendship agreement" with Deutsche Bank, by which the latter secured a presence in its board of directors. Creditanstalt executive Louis de Rothschild was immediately arrested and imprisoned, deprived of his position and property, then released upon payment of $21,000,000, believed to have been the largest bail bond in history for any individual, and migrated to the U.S. in 1939 after more than one year in custody. Later in 1938, Creditanstalt was jointly taken over, without compensation, by German government holding VIAG, Deutsche Bank, and the Reichsbank, which held respectively 51 percent, 25 percent, and 12 percent of its capital. In April 1942, Deutsche Bank raised its ownership to 51 percent by acquiring a block of shares from VIAG. During wartime, the Creditanstalt expanded its operations into Nazi-occupied Czechoslovakia, Poland, Yugoslavia, and in Nazi-allied Bulgaria.

In September 1938, following the Munich Agreement, Deutsche Bank took over the branches of Prague-based Böhmische Union Bank (BUB) in the Sudetenland. In March 1939, it forcibly took over control of the BUB itself, in which it built a majority stake complemented with prior shareholding of Creditanstalt. It also took over management control of the National Bank of Greece during the Axis occupation of Greece, without however acquiring ownership out of consideration for Italian sensitivities. Through the Creditanstalt-Bankverein, Deutsche Bank also became a major shareholder of the Allgemeiner Jugoslawischer Bankverein (AJB), which had been formed in 1928 from the two former branches of the Wiener Bankverein in Belgrade and Zagreb, and of the Landesbank für Bosnien und Herzegowina in Sarajevo, together with the Société Générale de Belgique and its affiliate Banque Belge pour l'Étranger. In 1940, following the German invasion of Belgium, Deutsche Bank bought out the Belgian stake under duress and became the AJB's dominant shareholder, with 88 percent held either directly or through Creditanstalt. Deutsche Bank simultaneously took control of the Landesbank in Sarajevo. Following the German invasion of Yugoslavia, the AJB was divided into two separate institutions, respectively the Bankverein AG Belgrad in occupied Serbia, and the Bankverein für Kroatien AG in the Independent State of Croatia. Both these banks' assets were eventually confiscated by the newly established Communist authorities in October 1944, and they were subsequently liquidated.

During the war, Deutsche Bank provided banking facilities for the Gestapo and, through its branch in Katowice, loaned the funds used to build the Auschwitz camp and the nearby IG Farben facilities. Deutsche Bank publicly acknowledged its involvement at Auschwitz in 1999. It also was a principal participant in the Nazi regime's gold transactions. Between 1942 and 1944, Deutsche Bank purchased 4,446 kg of gold from the Reichsbank, of which 744 kg came from Holocaust victims. In an effort to come to terms with its past during the Nazi era, Deutsche Bank in 1995 published a history volume that detailed its entanglement with the dictatorship. In December 1999, along with other major German companies, Deutsche Bank contributed to a US$5.2 billion compensation fund following lawsuits brought by Holocaust survivors; U.S. officials had reportedly threatened to block Deutsche Bank's $10 billion purchase of Bankers Trust if it did not contribute to the fund.

=== 1945–2000 ===
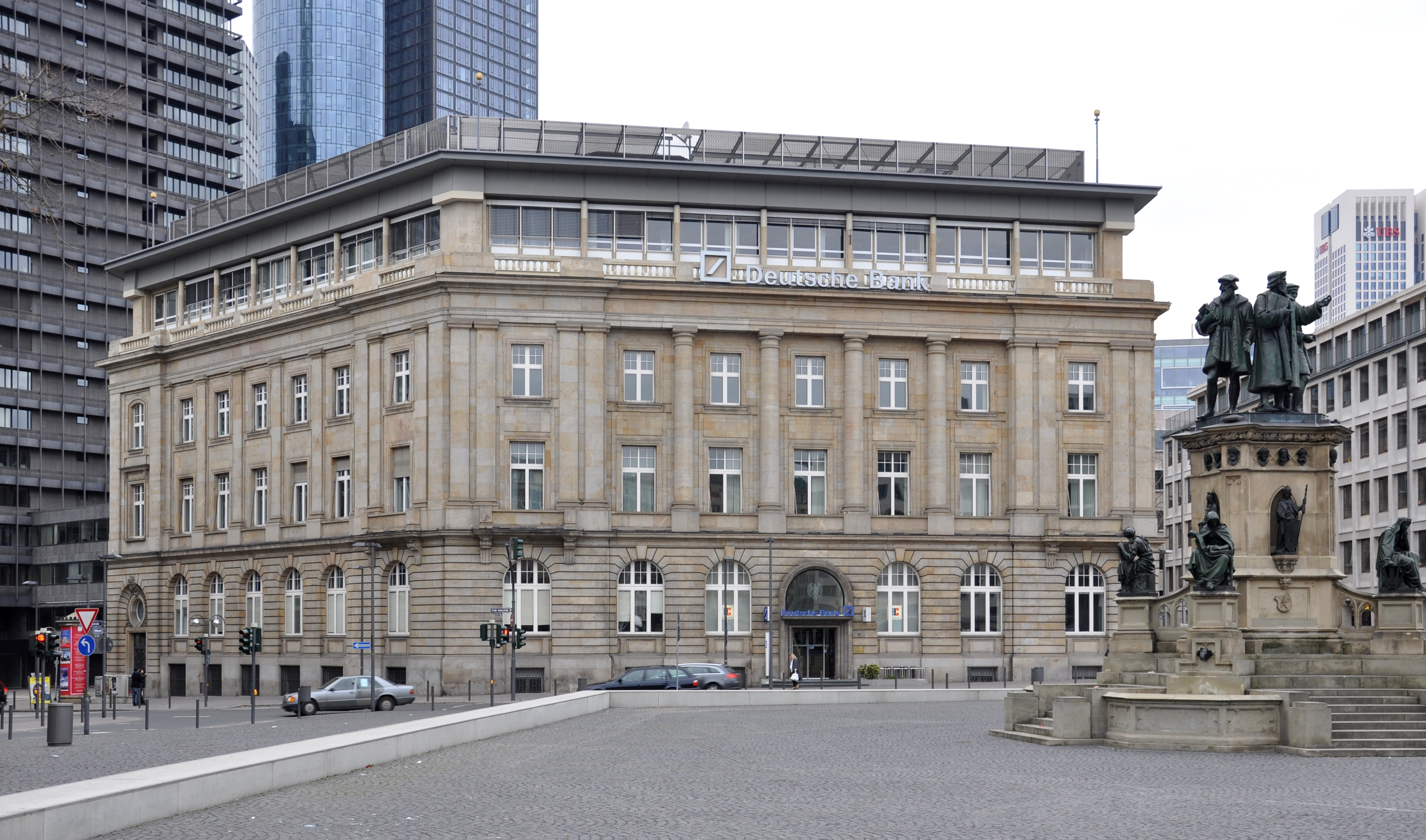
Former Disconto-Gesellschaft branch building in Frankfurt on the Roßmarkt (erected 1904), which served as head office of Deutsche Bank's Hesse unit from 1947 to 1952, of Süddeutsche Bank from 1952 to 1957, then of Deutsche Bank itself from 1957 to 1984

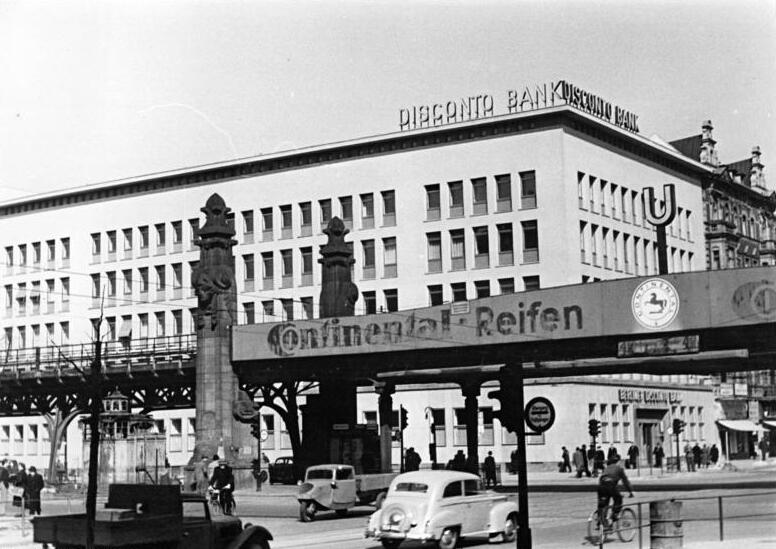
Head office of Disconto-Bank, Deutsche Bank's Berlin unit, designed by Paul Schwebes; completed 1951 and photographed in 1952

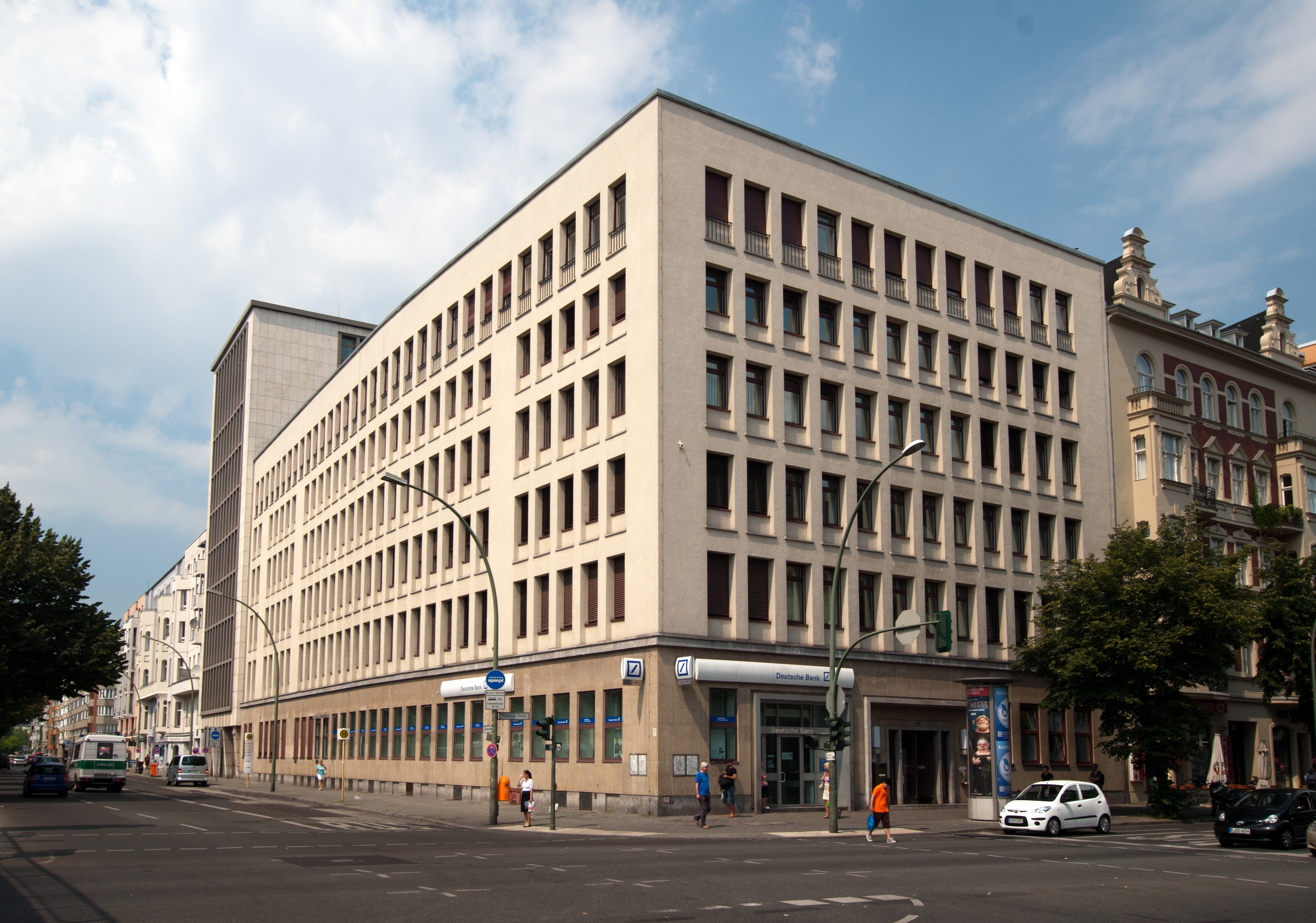
The same building (Potsdamer Straße 140, after upwards expansion in 1955–1957) in 2012, repurposed as Finanzamt Schöneberg and still hosting a branch of Deutsche Bank

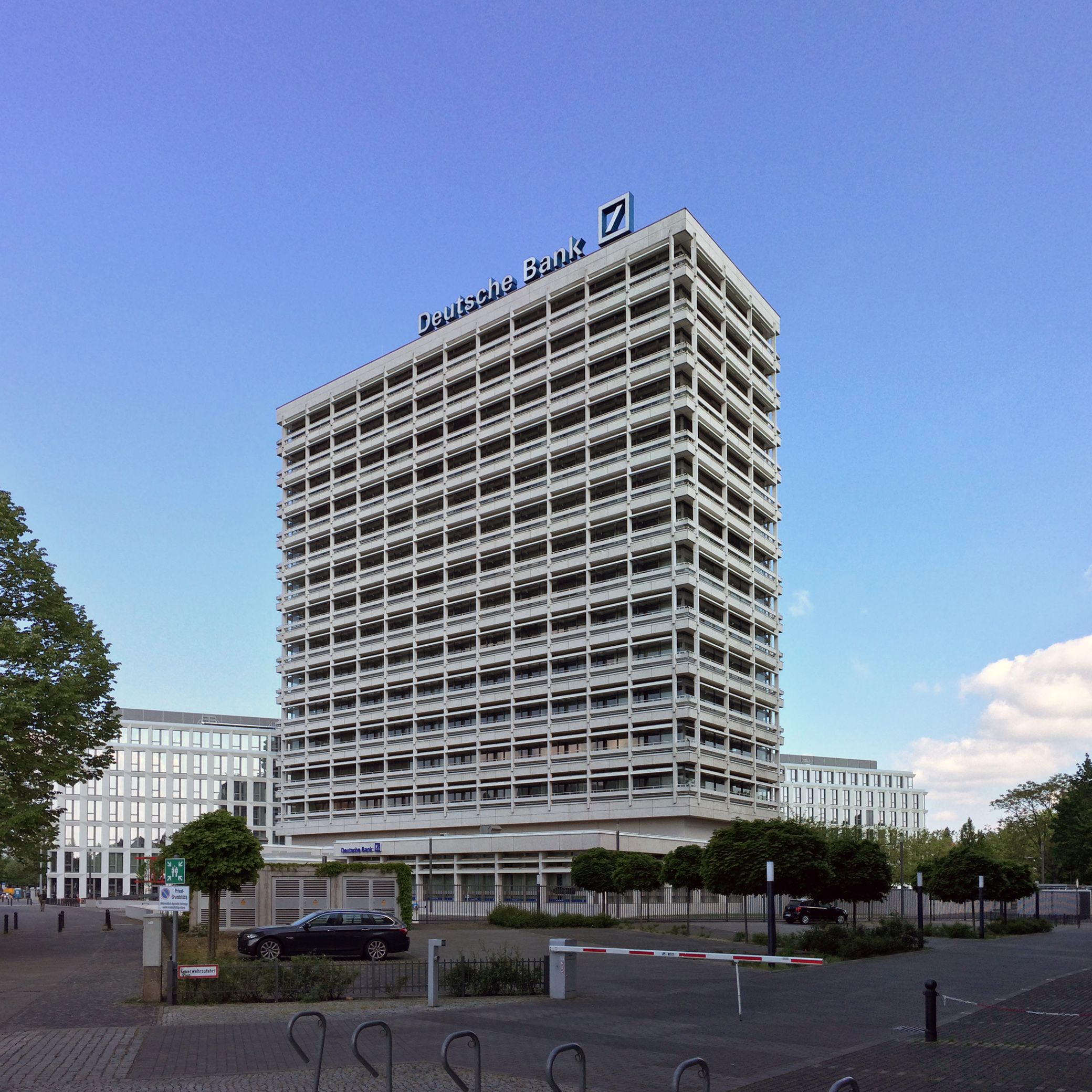
Highrise of the Deutsche Bank in Berlin, designed by Friedrich Koch and Günter Hönow, 1966–1968

Following Germany's defeat in World War II, the Allied authorities, in 1948, ordered Deutsche Bank's break-up into regional banks. These regional banks were later consolidated into three major banks in 1952: Norddeutsche Bank AG; Süddeutsche Bank AG; and Rheinisch-Westfälische Bank AG. In 1957, these three banks merged to form Deutsche Bank AG with its headquarters in Frankfurt. In 1959, the bank entered retail banking by introducing small personal loans. In the 1970s, the bank pushed ahead with international expansion, opening new offices in new locations, such as Milan (1977), Moscow, London, Paris, and Tokyo. In the 1980s, this continued when the bank paid US$603 million in 1986 to acquire Banca d'America e d'Italia. In 1972, the bank established its Fiduciary Services Division which provides support to its private wealth division. At 8:30 am on 30 November 1989, Alfred Herrhausen, chairman of Deutsche Bank, was killed when a car that he was in exploded while he was traveling in the Frankfurt suburb of Bad Homburg. The Red Army Faction claimed responsibility for the blast.

Also in 1989, the first steps towards creating a significant investment-banking presence were taken with the acquisition of Morgan, Grenfell & Co., a UK-based investment bank which was renamed Deutsche Morgan Grenfell in 1994. In 1995 to greatly expand into international investments and money management, Deutsche Bank hired Edson Mitchell, a risk specialist from Merrill Lynch, who hired two other former Merrill Lynch risk specialists Anshu Jain and William S. Broeksmit. In the year 1991 the majority of the deposit-taking business (especially corporate and retail banking), as well as a number of branch buildings and locations, were taken from the Deutsche Kreditbank together with the Dresdner Bank in the course of the currency union, and ran until 1993 under Dresdner Bank Kreditbank AG and Deutsche Bank Kreditbank AG until 1994.

By the mid-1990s, the buildup of a capital-markets operation had got underway with the arrival of a number of high-profile figures from major competitors. Ten years after the acquisition of Morgan Grenfell, the US firm Bankers Trust was added. Bankers Trust suffered losses during the 1998 Russian financial crisis since it had a large position in Russian government bonds, but avoided financial collapse by being acquired by Deutsche Bank for $10 billion in November 1998. On 4 June 1999, Deutsche Bank merged its Deutsche Morgan Grenfell and Bankers Trust to become Deutsche Asset Management (DAM) with Robert Smith as the CEO. This made Deutsche Bank the fourth-largest money management firm in the world after UBS, Fidelity Investments, and the Japanese post office's life insurance fund. At the time, Deutsche Bank owned a 12% stake in DaimlerChrysler but United States banking laws prohibit banks from owning industrial companies, so Deutsche Bank received an exception to this prohibition through 1978 legislation from Congress.

Deutsche continued to build up its presence in Italy with the acquisition in 1993 of Banca Popolare di Lecco from Banca Popolare di Novara for about $476 million. In 1999, it acquired a minority interest in Cassa di Risparmio di Asti.

=== 21st century ===
In the 11 September 2001 terrorist attacks, the Deutsche Bank Building in Lower Manhattan, formerly Bankers Trust Plaza, was heavily damaged by the collapse of the South Tower of the World Trade Center. Demolition work on the 39-story building continued for nearly a decade, and was completed in early 2011.

In October 2001, Deutsche Bank was listed on the New York Stock Exchange. This was the first NYSE listing after interruption due to 11 September attacks. The following year, Josef Ackermann became CEO of Deutsche Bank and served as CEO until 2012 when he became involved with the Bank of Cyprus. Then, beginning in 2002, Deutsche Bank strengthened its U.S. presence when it purchased Scudder Investments.

Meanwhile, in Europe, Deutsche Bank increased its private-banking business by acquiring Rued Blass & Cie (2002) and the Russian investment bank United Financial Group (2005) founded by the United States banker Charles Ryan and the Russian official Boris Fyodorov which followed Anshu Jain's aggressive expansion to gain strong relationships with state partners in Russia. Jain persuaded Ryan to remain with Deutsche Bank at its new Russian offices and later, in April 2007, sent the president and chairman of the management board of VTB Bank Andrey Kostin's son Andrey to Deutsche Bank's Moscow office. (Note: Andrey Kostin (1979–2011), a Russian banker and son of Andrey Kostin who is the president and chairman of the management board of VTB Bank, graduated from the Russian Government Finance Academy in 2000 and began working with Deutsche Bank's London office in 2000. From 2002 to 2007, the younger Andrey Kostin worked in Deutsche Bank's Office of Interbank and Corporate Sales in the countries of Central and Eastern Europe, the Middle East and Africa. In April 2007, Anshu Jain sent the younger Andrey Kostin to work at Deutsche Bank's Moscow office. While he was at Deutsche Bank's Moscow office, the Moscow office began posting profits of $500 million to $1 billion a year. He served on its management board beginning July 2008 and was the deputy chairman of the management board from February 2011. On 2 July 2011, at 7:30 am, while he was at a vacation retreat reserved for FSB personnel, he died when his Can-Am Outlander-800 ATV crashed into a tree along a country road near Pereslavl-Zalessky and the village of Los (Russian: Лось) in the Yaroslavl region of Russia. He was not wearing a helmet.) Later, in 2008, to establish VTB Capital, numerous bankers from Deutsche Bank's Moscow office were hired by VTB Capital. In Germany, further acquisitions of Norisbank, Berliner Bank and Deutsche Postbank strengthened Deutsche Bank's retail offering in its home market. This series of acquisitions was closely aligned with the bank's strategy of bolt-on acquisitions in preference to so-called "transformational" mergers. These formed part of an overall growth strategy that also targeted a sustainable 25% return on equity, something the bank achieved in 2005.

On 1 October 2003, Deutsche Bank and Dresdner Bank entered into a payment transaction agreement with Postbank to have Postbank process payments as the clearing center for the three banks. Since the mid-1990s Deutsche Bank commercial real estate division offered Donald Trump financial backing, even though in the early 1990s Citibank, Manufacturers Hanover, Chemical, Bankers Trust, and 68 other entities refused to financially support him. (Note: Justin Kennedy, son of Anthony Kennedy, and others such as Jon Vaccaro, Mike Offit, Steve Stuart, Eric Schwartz, and Tobin "Toby" Cobb are central to Donald Trump's financial support at Deutsche Bank. Justin Kennedy worked for Deutsche Bank from 1997 to 2009 becoming the global head of real estate capital markets.) In 2008, Trump sued Deutsche Bank for $3 billion and a few years later, he shifted his financial portfolio from the investment banking division to Deutsche Bank private wealth division with Rosemary Vrablic, formerly of Citigroup, Bank of America, and Merrill Lynch, becoming Trump's new personal banker at Deutsche Bank. (Note: Because of Deutsche Bank's global presence and strong support from attorneys in the United States and elsewhere, the Fiduciary Services Division, especially at the Singapore branch of Deutsche Bank, and closely associated one stop service provider companies including Atlas Corporate Services, Commonwealth Trust Limited (CTL), and the Portcullis TrustNet Group which was established in the 1980s gives support to private wealth management by establishing structures in critical places in the world such as trusts in Crown possessions including Guernsey, Isle of Man, Jersey; limited liability companies (LLC) in United Kingdom, Delaware, etc.; foundations in Liechtenstein; holding companies in Delaware, Bahamas, Cayman Islands, British Virgin Islands, Belize, Nevis, Seychelles, Mauritius, Hong Kong, Malaysia, Singapore, New Zealand, Cook Islands, Samoa, Marshall Islands, Panama, Ireland, United Kingdom, Luxembourg, Monaco, Cyprus, Gibraltar, etc.; discrete bank accounts in Panama, Bahamas, Switzerland, Latvia, Cyprus, Beijing, etc.)

In 2007, the company's headquarters, the Deutsche Bank Twin Towers building, was extensively renovated for three years, certified LEED Platinum and DGNB Gold. In 2010, the bank developed and owned the Cosmopolitan of Las Vegas, after the casino's original developer defaulted on its borrowings. Deutsche Bank ran it at a loss until its sale in May 2014. The bank's exposure at the time of sale was more than $4 billion, and sold the property to Blackstone Group for $1.73 billion.

==== Housing credit bubble and CDO market ====
On 3 January 2014, it was reported that Deutsche Bank would settle a lawsuit brought by US shareholders, who had accused the bank of bundling and selling bad real estate loans before the 2008 downturn. This settlement came subsequent and in addition to Deutsche's $1.93 billion settlement with the US Housing Finance Agency over similar litigation related to the sale of mortgage-backed securities to Fannie Mae and Freddie Mac.

==== Leveraged super-senior trades ====
Former employees including Eric Ben-Artzi and Matthew Simpson have claimed that, during the crisis, Deutsche failed to recognize up to $12 billion of paper losses on its $130 billion portfolio of leveraged super senior trades, although the bank rejects the claims. A company document of May 2009 described the trades as "the largest risk in the trading book", and the whistleblowers allege that had the bank accounted properly for its positions its capital would have fallen to the extent that it might have needed a government bailout. One of them claims that "If Lehman Brothers didn't have to mark its books for six months it might still be in business, and if Deutsche had marked its books it might have been in the same position as Lehman."

Deutsche had become the biggest operator in this market, which were a form of credit derivative designed to behave like the most senior tranche of a CDO. Deutsche bought insurance against default by blue-chip companies from investors, mostly Canadian pension funds, who received a stream of insurance premiums as income in return for posting a small amount of collateral. The bank then sold protection to US investors via the CDX credit index, the spread between the two was tiny but was worth $270m over the 7 years of the trade. It was considered very unlikely that many blue chips would have problems at the same time, so Deutsche required collateral of just 10% of the contract value.

The risk of Deutsche taking large losses if the collateral was wiped out in a crisis was called the gap option. Ben-Artzi claims that after modeling came up with "economically unfeasible" results, Deutsche accounted for the gap option first with a simple 15% "haircut" on the trades (described as inadequate by another employee in 2006) and then in 2008 by a $1–2bn reserve for the credit correlation desk designed to cover all risks, not just the gap option. In October 2008, it stopped modeling the gap option and just bought S&P put options to guard against further market disruption, but one of the whistleblowers has described this as an inappropriate hedge. A model from Ben-Artzi's previous job at Goldman Sachs suggested that the gap option was worth about 8% of the value of the trades, worth $10.4bn. Simpson claims that traders were not simply understating the gap option but actively mismarking the value of their trades.

In May 2015, the U.S. Securities and Exchange Commission "charged Deutsche Bank AG with filing misstated financial reports during the height of the financial crisis that failed to take into account a material risk for potential losses estimated to be in the billions of dollars. Deutsche Bank agreed to pay a $55 million penalty to settle the charges. An SEC investigation found that Deutsche Bank overvalued a portfolio of derivatives consisting of “Leveraged Super Senior” (LSS) trades through which the bank purchased protection against credit default losses. Because the trades were leveraged, the collateral posted for these positions by the sellers was only a fraction (approximately 9 percent) of the $98 billion total in purchased protection. This leverage created a “gap risk” that the market value of Deutsche Bank’s protection could at some point exceed the available collateral, and the sellers could decide to unwind the trade rather than post additional collateral in that scenario. Therefore, Deutsche Bank was protected only up to the collateral level and not for the full market value of its credit protection. Deutsche Bank initially took the gap risk into account in its financial statements by adjusting down the value of the LSS positions. The SEC’s investigation was conducted by Amy Friedman, Michael Baker, Eli Bass, and Kapil Agrawal. The case was supervised by Scott Friestad, Laura Josephs, Ms. Friedman, and Dwayne Brown."

==== European debt crisis, 2009–today ====
In 2008, Deutsche Bank reported its first annual loss in five decades, despite receiving billions of dollars from its insurance arrangements with AIG, including US$11.8 billion from funds provided by US taxpayers to bail out AIG. Based on a preliminary estimation from the European Banking Authority (EBA), in late 2011, Deutsche Bank AG needed to raise capital of about €3.2 billion as part of a required 9% core Tier 1 ratio after sovereign debt write-down starting in mid-2012. As of 2012, Deutsche Bank had negligible exposure to Greece, but Spain and Italy accounted for a tenth of its European private and corporate banking business with credit risks of about €18 billion in Italy and €12 billion in Spain. In 2017, Deutsche Bank needed to get its common equity tier-1 capital ratio up to 12.5% in 2018 to be marginally above the 12.25% required by regulators.

==== Since 2012 ====
In January 2014, Deutsche Bank reported a €1.2 billion ($1.6 billion) pre-tax loss for the fourth quarter of 2013. This came after analysts had predicted a profit of nearly €600 million, according to FactSet estimates. Revenues slipped by 16% versus the prior year. Deutsche Bank's Capital Ratio Tier-1 (CET1) was reported in 2015 to be only 11.4%, lower than the 12% median CET1 ratio of Europe's 24 biggest publicly traded banks, so there would be no dividend for 2015 and 2016. Furthermore, 15,000 jobs were to be cut. In June 2015, the then co-CEOs, Jürgen Fitschen and Anshu Jain, both offered their resignations to the bank's supervisory board, which were accepted. Jain's resignation took effect in June 2015, but he provided consultancy to the bank until January 2016. Fitschen continued as joint CEO until May 2016. The appointment of John Cryan as joint CEO was announced, effective July 2015; he became sole CEO at the end of Fitschen's term.

In January 2016, Deutsche Bank pre-announced a 2015 loss before income taxes of approximately €6.1 billion and a net loss of approximately €6.7 billion. Following this announcement, a bank analyst at Citi declared: "We believe a capital increase now looks inevitable and see an equity shortfall of up to €7 billion, on the basis that Deutsche may be forced to book another €3 billion to €4 billion of litigation charges in 2016." In May 2017, Chinese conglomerate HNA Group became its biggest shareholder, owning 9.90% of its shares. However, HNA Group's stake reduced to 8.8% as of 16 February 2018. In November 2018, the bank's Frankfurt offices were raided by police in connection with investigations around the Panama papers and money laundering. Deutsche Bank released a statement confirming it would "cooperate closely with prosecutors". AUTO1 FinTech is a joint venture of AUTO1 Group, Allianz, SoftBank and Deutsche Bank. In February 2019, HNA Group announced cutting stake in Deutsche Bank to 6.3 percent. It was further reduced to 0.19 percent as at March 2019.

During the Annual General Meeting in May 2019, CEO Christian Sewing said he was expecting a "deluge of criticism" about the bank's performance and announced that he was ready to make "tough cutbacks" after the failure of merger negotiations with Commerzbank AG and weak profitability. According to The New York Times, "its finances and strategy [are] in disarray and 95 percent of its market value [has been] erased". News headlines in late June 2019 claimed that the bank would cut 20,000 jobs, over 20% of its staff, in a restructuring plan. On 8 July 2019, the bank began to cut 18,000 jobs, including entire teams of equity traders in Europe, the US, and Asia. On the previous day, Sewing had laid blame on unnamed predecessors who created a "culture of poor capital allocation" and chasing revenue for the sake of revenue, according to a Financial Times report, and promised that going forward, the bank "will only operate where we are competitive".

In January 2020, Deutsche Bank had decided to cut the bonus pool at its investment branch by 30% following restructuring efforts. In February 2021, it was reported that Deutsche Bank made a profit of €113 million ($135.6 million) for 2020, the first annual net profit it had posted since 2014. In March 2021, Deutsche Bank sold about $4 billion of holdings seized in the implosion of Archegos Capital Management in a private deal. The move helped Deutsche Bank emerge unscathed after Archegos defaulted on margin loans used to build up highly leveraged bets on stocks. In April 2023, Deutsche Bank announced the acquisition of Numis, a British investment bank, for €463 million. In March 2025, Marcus Chromik joined Deutsche Bank was appointed as a member of the Management Board on 1 May 2025, and became Chief Risk Officer on 20 May 2025. He previously served as Chief Risk Officer at Commerzbank from January 2016 to December 2023.

Also in March 2025, Deutsche Bank announced that Kirsty Roth, Chief Operations and Technology Officer at Thomson Reuters, and Klaus Moosmayer, Chief Ethics, Risk & Compliance Officer at Novartis, have been proposed to join its supervisory board at the annual shareholder meeting on 22 May. The bank is also undergoing a management revamp, with CEO Christian Sewing's contract extended to April 2029 as announced in March 2025 and departures from the executive board, including the finance chief. Moosmayer is leaving Novartis, with Karen Hale taking over his responsibilities. In April 2025, Deutsche Bank held its Emerging Markets Family Office Forum in Hong Kong, bringing together approximately 150 participants, including ultra-high-net-worth individuals and family offices from Europe, Asia, and the Middle East. Alexander Wynaendts has been Chairman of the Supervisory Board since May 2022. In November 2025, he was nominated for re-election for another four-year term at the 2026 Annual General Meeting. James von Moltke served as Chief Financial Officer from 2017 until March 2026. Raja Akram joined the Management Board on 1 January 2026, and assumed the role of Chief Financial Officer in March 2026, having previously served as Deputy Chief Financial Officer at Morgan Stanley.

==== 21st-century acquisitions ====
- Scudder Investments, 2001
- RREEF, 2002
- Berkshire Mortgage Finance, 22 October 2004
- Chapel Funding (now DB Home Lending), 12 September 2006
- Norisbank, 2 November 2006
- MortgageIT, 3 January 2007
- Hollandsche Bank-Unie, 2 July 2008
- Sal. Oppenheim, 2010
- Deutsche Postbank, 2010
- Park Plaza Mall (enclosed shopping center in Little Rock, Arkansas), 2021
- Numis, 2023
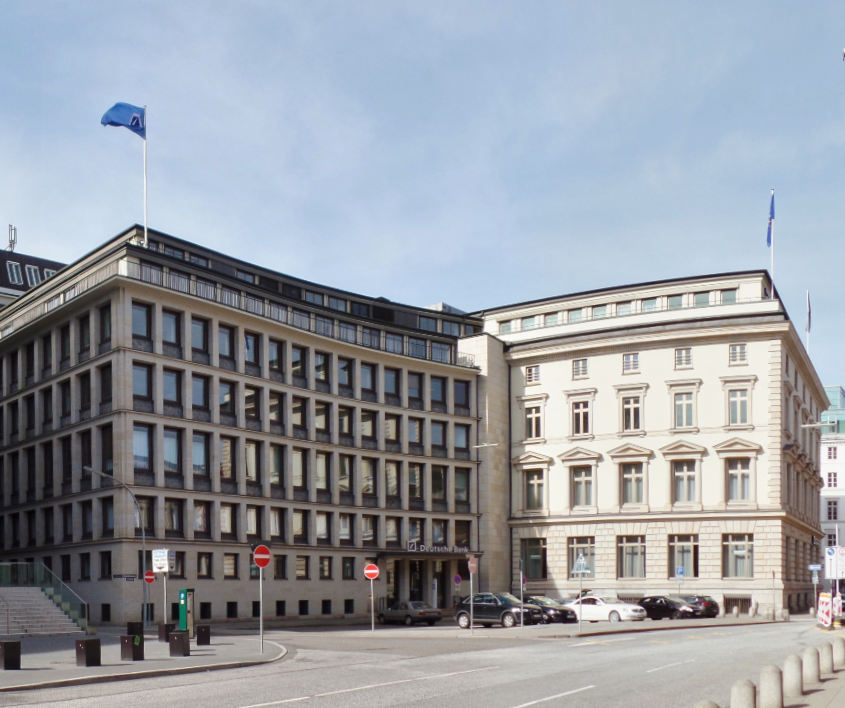
Branch in Hamburg first opened 1872, current buildings erected 1896-1897 (right) and 1951-1953 (left)

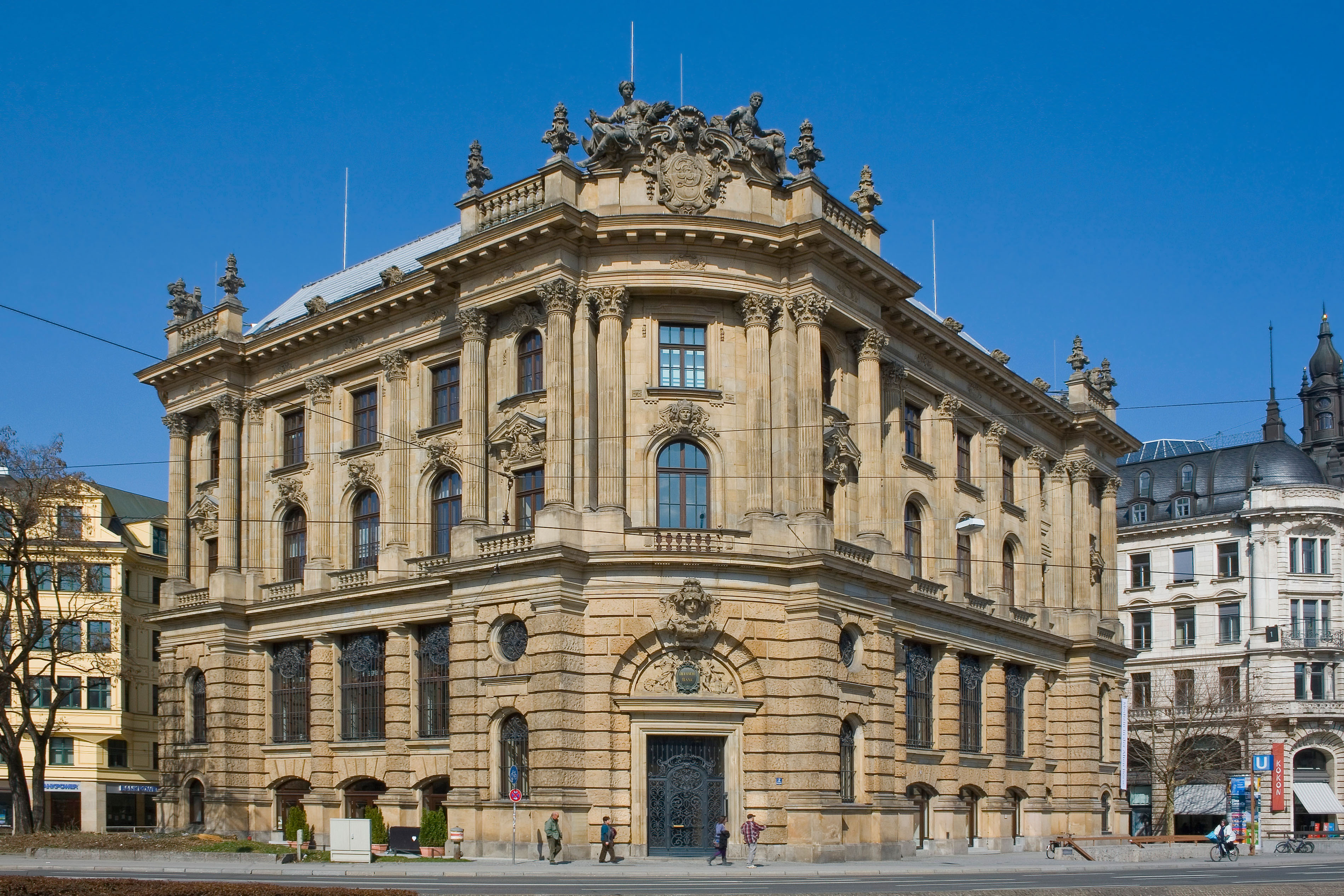
Former branch in Munich

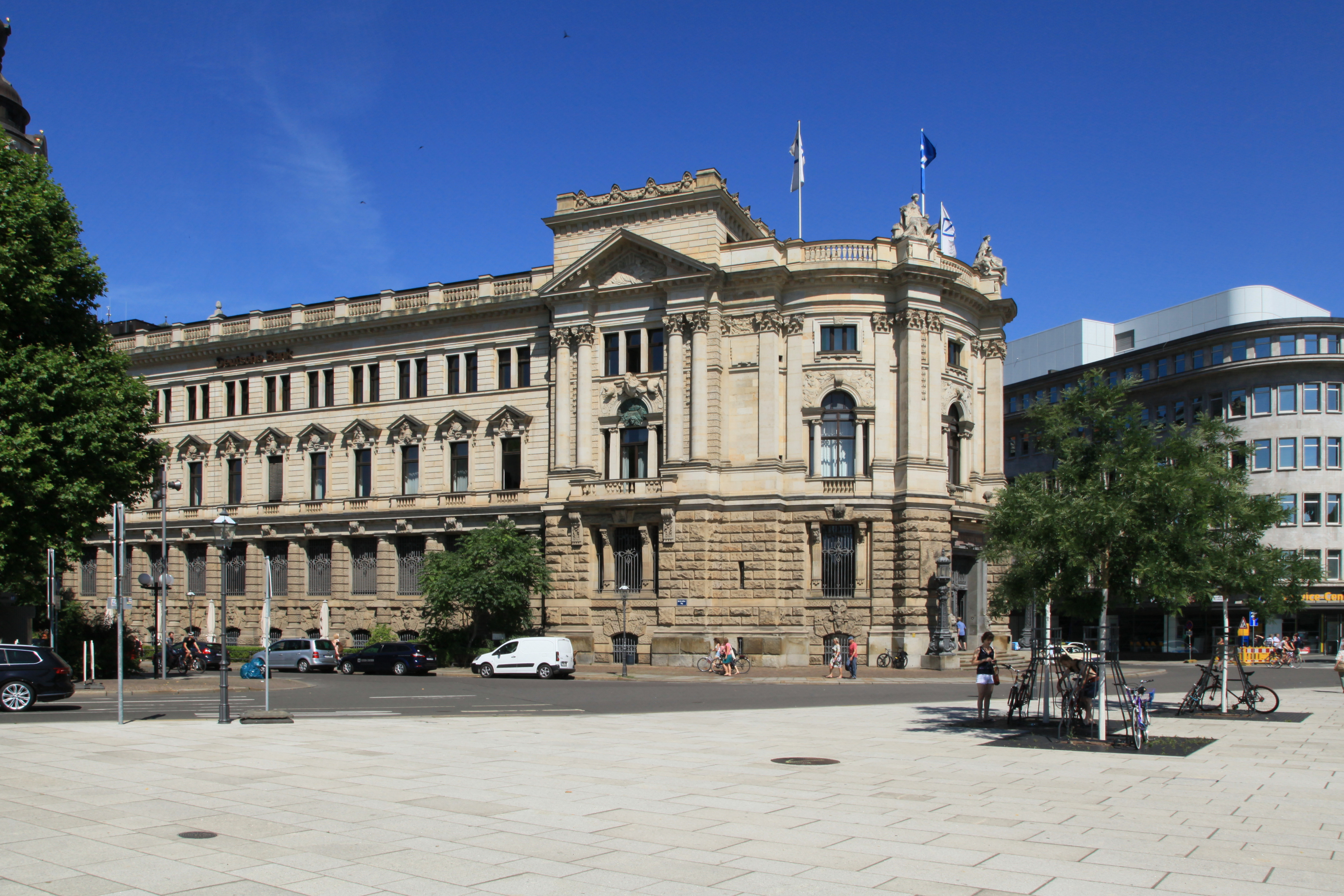
Branch in Leipzig, former Leipziger Bank

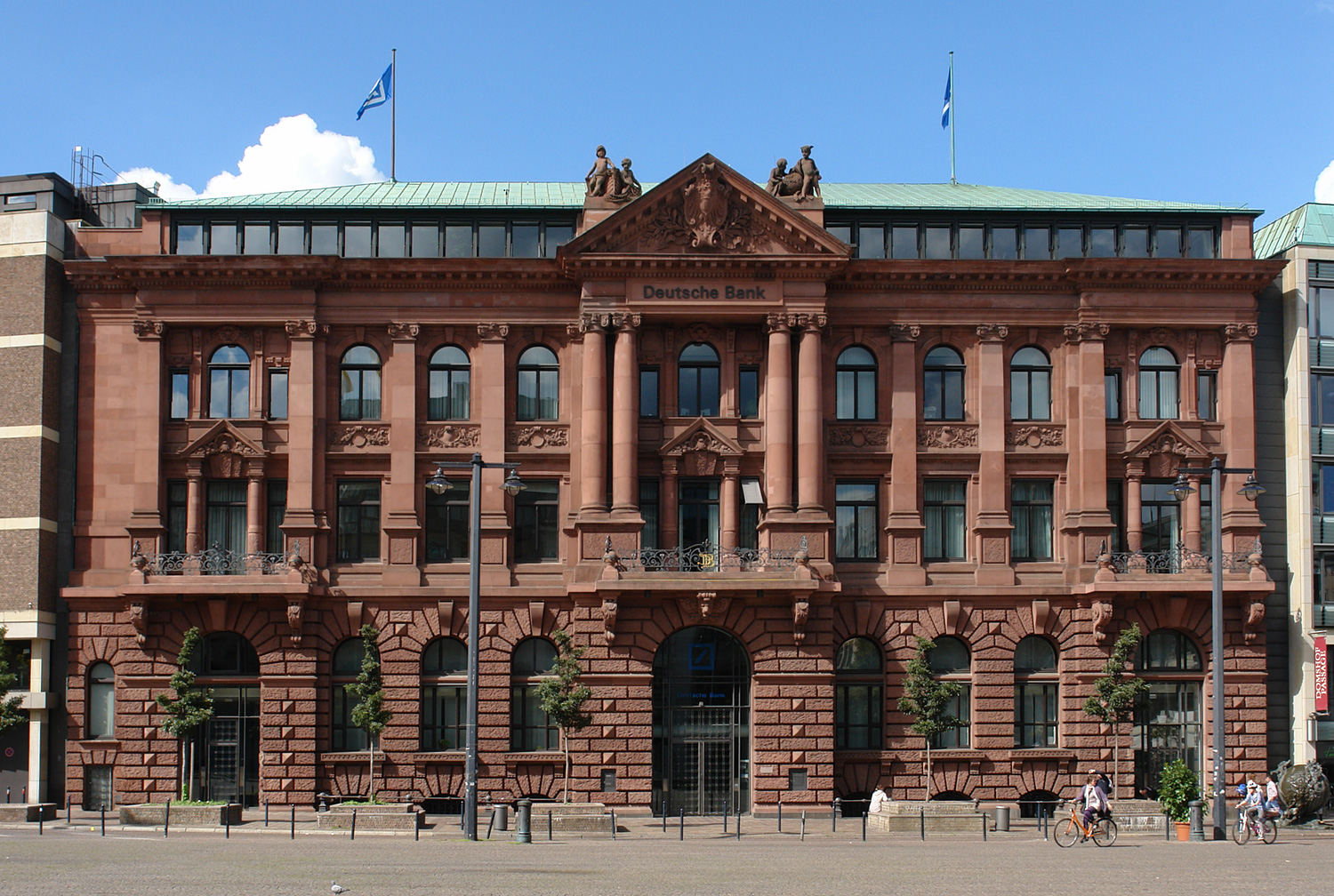
Branch in Bremen

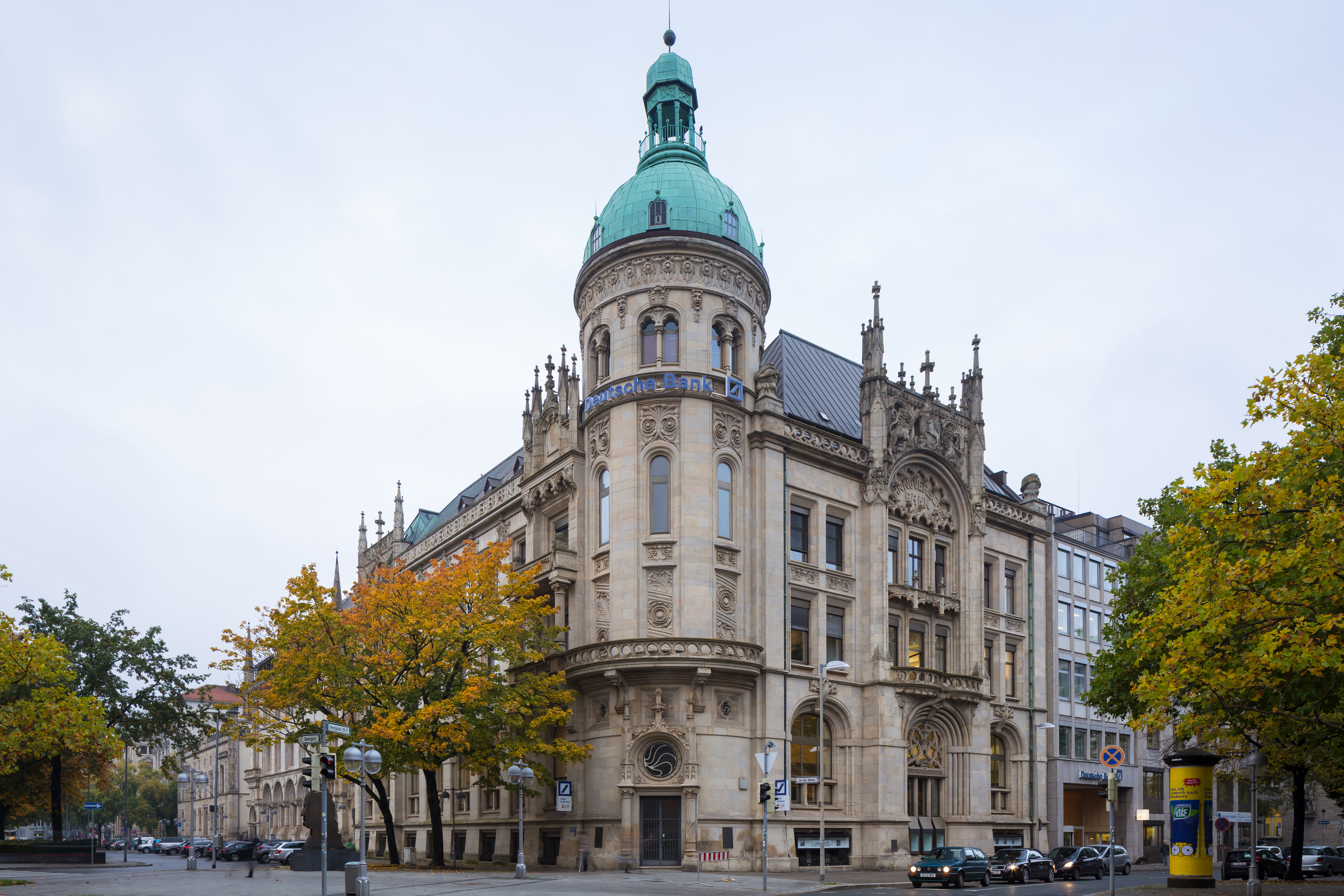
Branch in Hanover, former Hannoversche Bank (taken over by Deutsche in 1920)

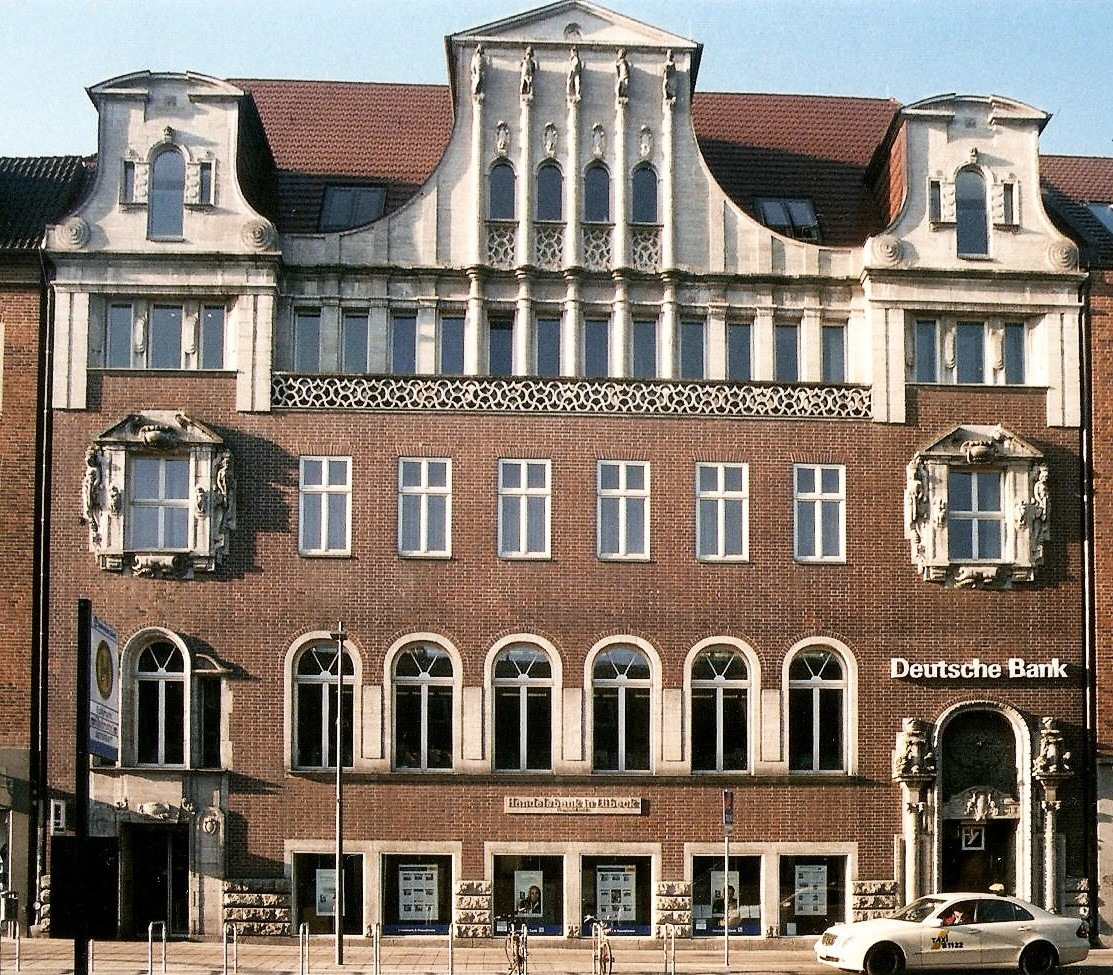
Branch in Lübeck, former Commerz-Bank

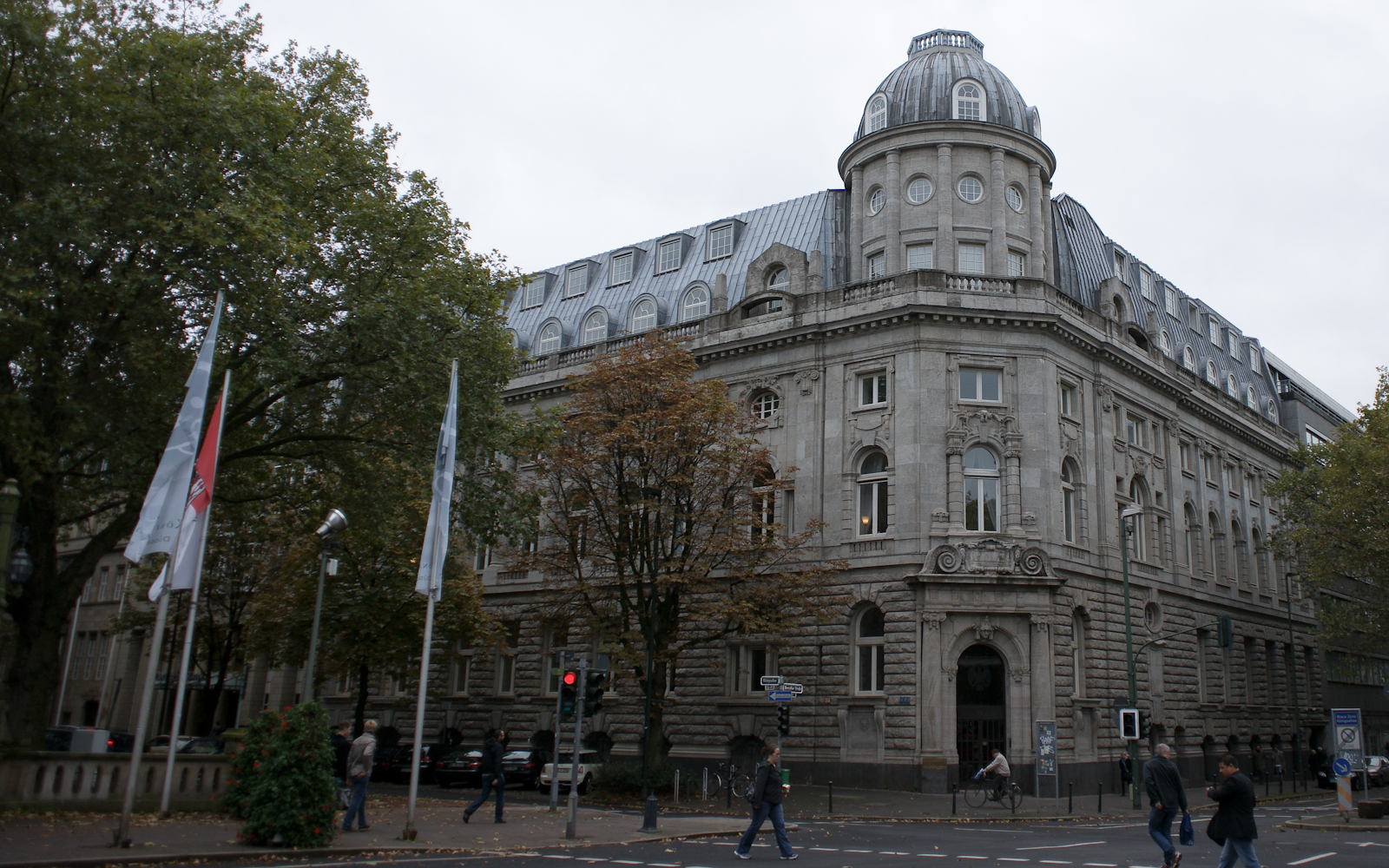
Branch in Düsseldorf

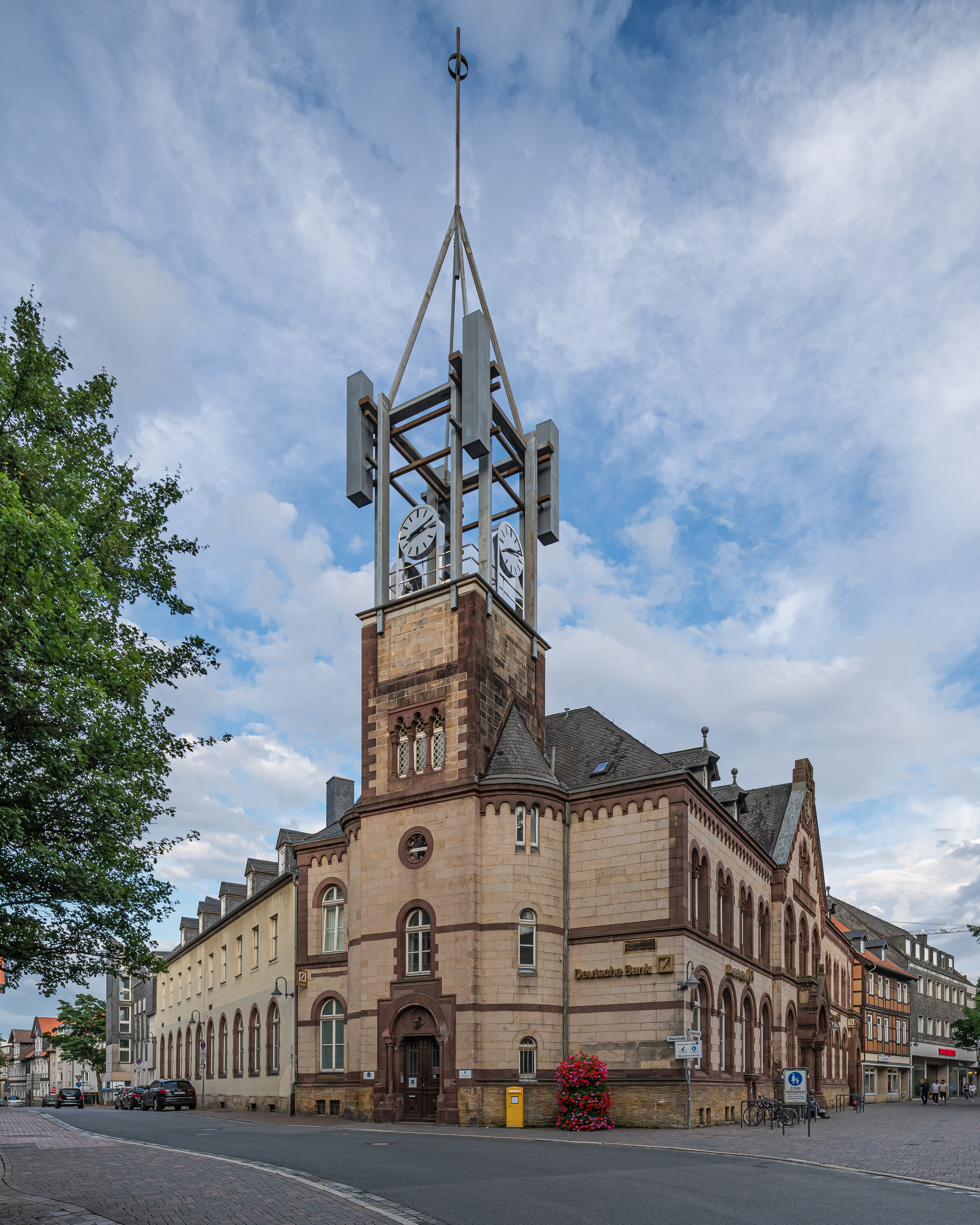
Branch in Goslar

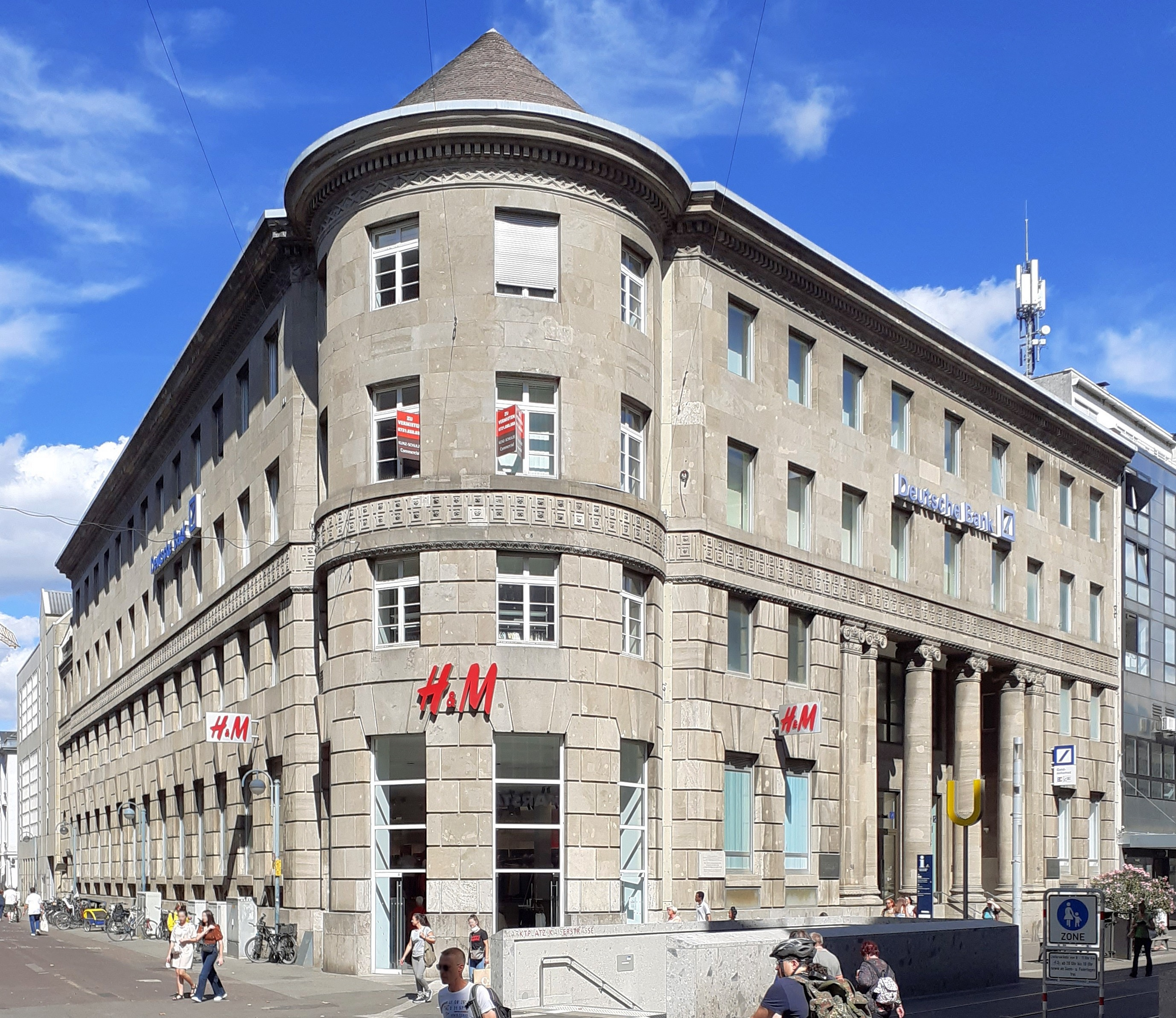
Branch in Karlsruhe

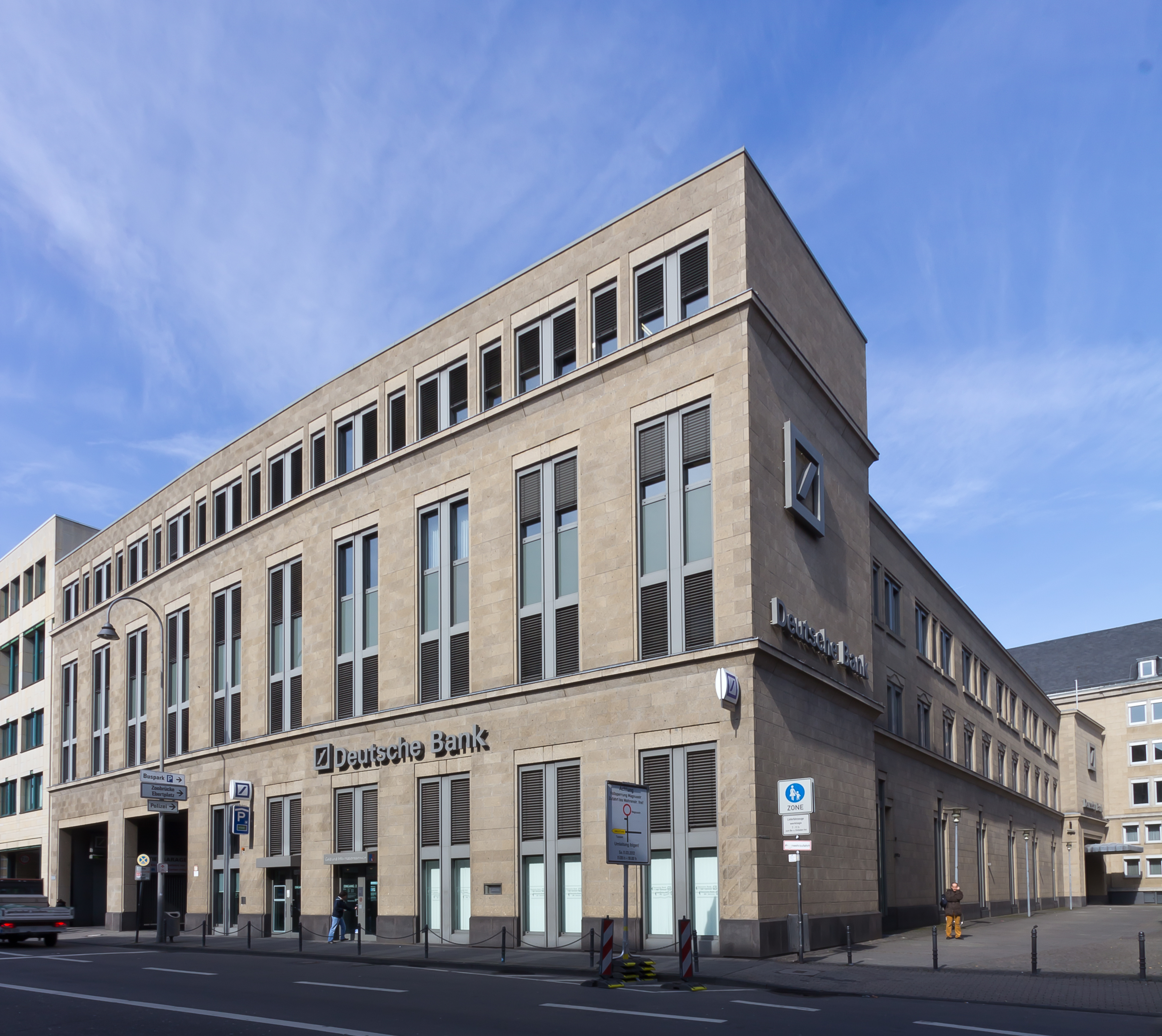
Branch in Cologne, former head office of Sal. Oppenheim

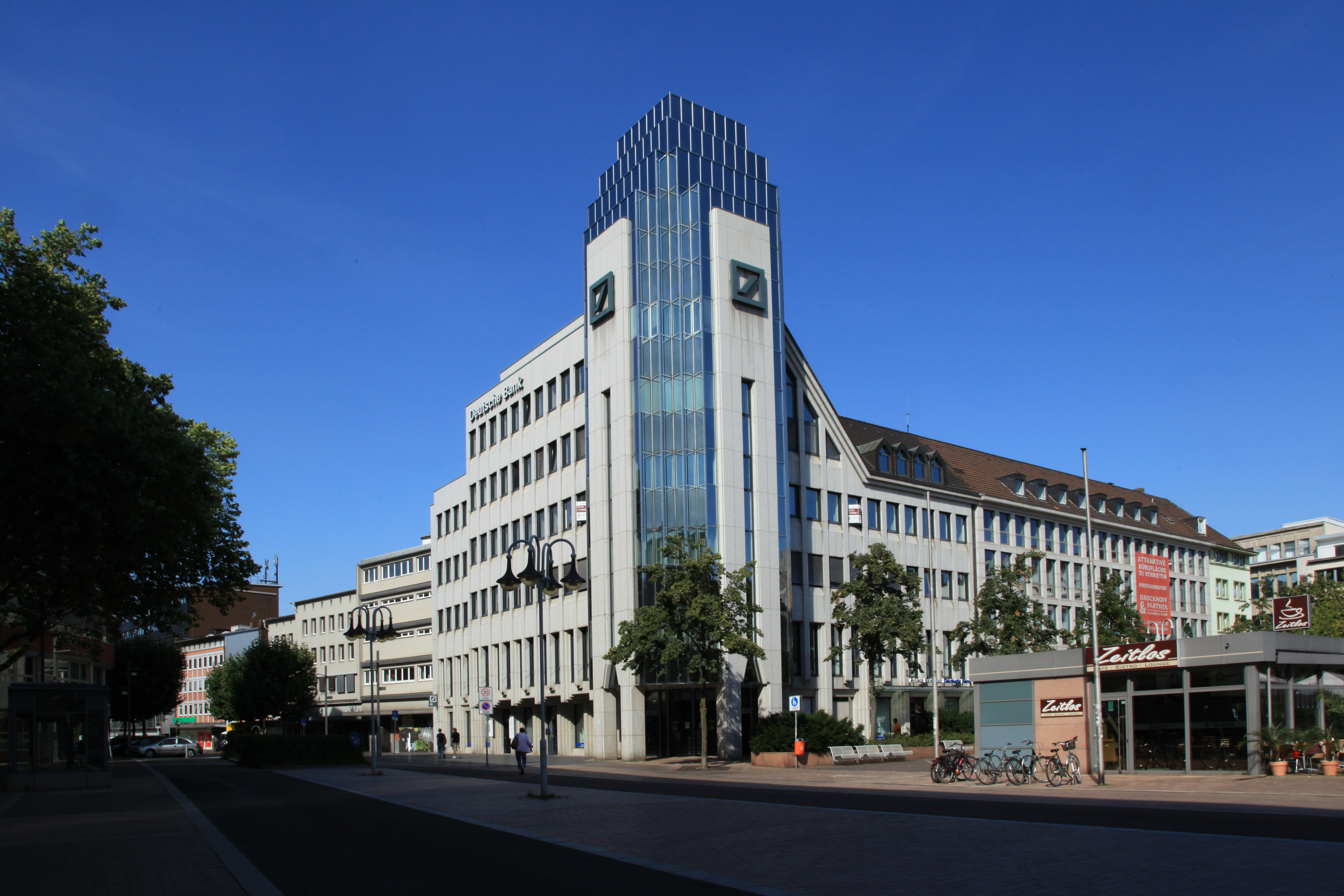
Branch in Bochum

== Finances ==
Year	2005	2006	2007	2008	2009	2010	2011	2012	2013	2014	2015
Revenue (€ billions)	25.6	28.5	30.7	13.6	28.0	28.6	33.3	33.7	31.9	31.9	33.5
Net income (€ billions)	3.5	6.1	6.5	−3.9	5.0	2.3	4.3	0.3	0.7	1.7	−6.8
Total Assets (€ billions)	992	1,584	2,020	2,202	2,202	1,906	2,164	2,022	1,611	1,629	1,709
Employees	63,427	68,849	78,291	80,456	77,053	102,062	100,996	98,219	98,254	98,138	101,104
Year	2016	2017	2018	2019	2020	2021	2022	2023	2024	2025	
Revenue (€ billions)	30.0	26.4	25.3	23.2	24.0	25.4	27.2	28.9	30.1	32.1	
Net income (€ billions)	−1.4	−0.7	−0.1	−5.7	0.1	1.9	5.0	4.2	2.7	6.1	
Total Assets (€ billions)	1,591	1,475	1,348	1,298	1,325	1,324	1,337	1,312	1,387	1,435	
Employees	99,744	97,535	91,737	87,597	84,659	82,969	84,930	90,130	89,753	89,879	

== Shareholders ==
Deutsche Bank is one of the leading listed companies in German post-war history. Its shares are traded on the Frankfurt Stock Exchange and, since 2001, also on the New York Stock Exchange and are included in various indices, including the DAX and the Euro Stoxx 50. As the share had lost value since mid-2015 and market capitalization had shrunk to around €18 billion, it temporarily withdrew from the Euro Stoxx 50 on 8 August 2016. With a 0.73% stake, it is currently the company with the lowest index weighting. In 2001, Deutsche Bank merged its mortgage banking business with that of Dresdner Bank and Commerzbank to form Eurohypo AG. In 2005, Deutsche Bank sold its stake in the joint company to Commerzbank.

Large shareholders
Share	Shareholder	Date of latest disclosure
8.14%	BlackRock Inc.	19 January 2026
4.54%	Paramount Services Holdings Ltd.	25 January 2023
3.025%	Amundi S.A.	23 December 2025

== Logotype ==
In 1972, the bank created the blue logo "Slash in a Square" – designed by Anton Stankowski and intended to represent growth within a risk-controlled framework.

== Business divisions ==
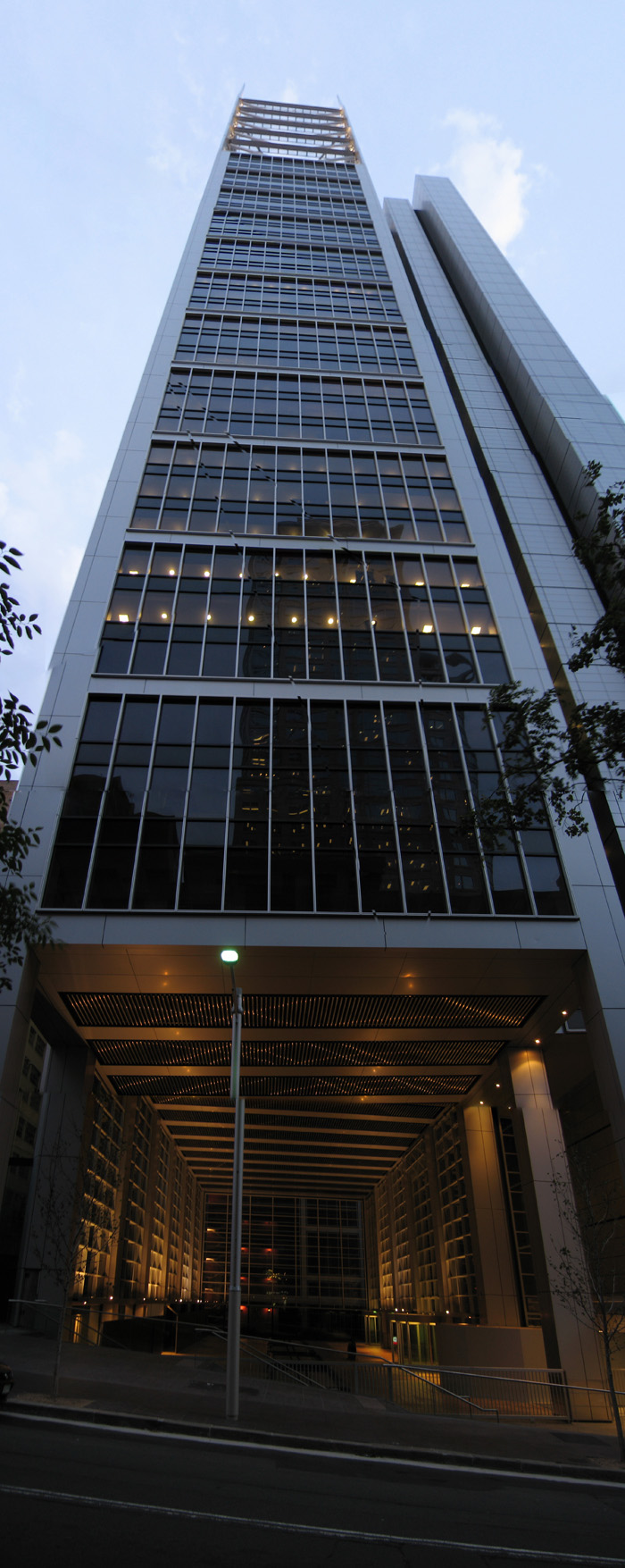
Deutsche Bank, Sydney

The bank's business model rests on three pillars – the Corporate & Investment Bank (CIB), the Private & Commercial Bank and Asset Management (DWS).

=== Corporate and Investment Bank (CIB) ===
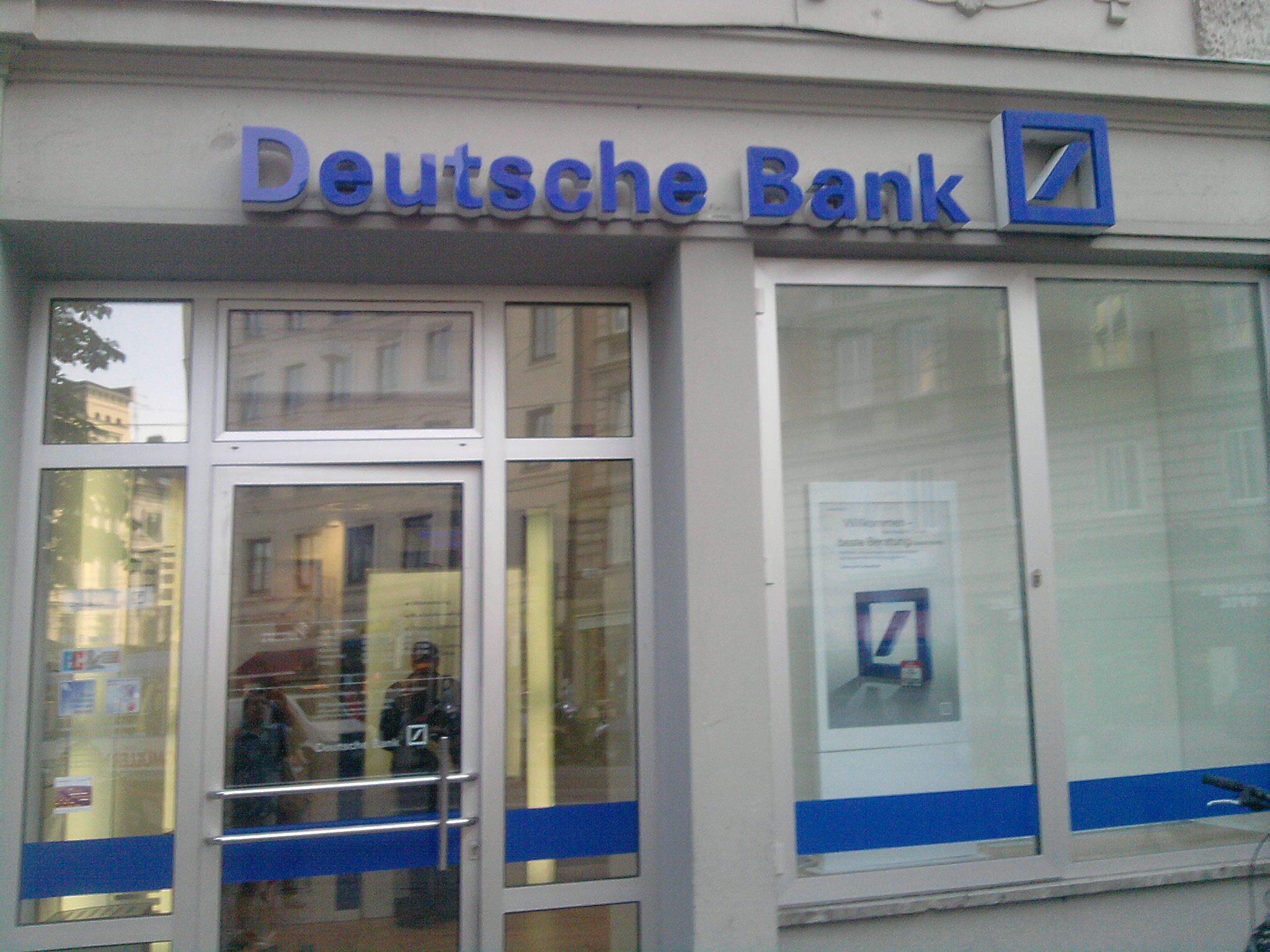
A Deutsche Bank retail branch in Munich

The Corporate & Investment Bank (CIB) is Deutsche Bank's capital markets business. The CIB comprises the below six units.

- Corporate Finance is responsible for advisory and mergers & acquisitions (M&A).
- Equities / Fixed Income & Currencies. These two units are responsible for sales and trading of securities.
- Global Capital Markets (GCM) is focused on financing and risk management solutions. It includes debt and equity issuances.
- Global Transaction Banking (GTB) caters to corporates and financial institutions by providing commercial banking products including cross-border payments, cash management, Securities Services, and international trade finance.
- Deutsche Bank Research provides analysis of products, markets, and trading strategies.

=== Private and Commercial Bank ===
Private Bank is the retail and private banking division of Deutsche Bank. In Germany, it operates under two brands – Deutsche Bank and Postbank. Additionally, the division maintains operations in Belgium, Italy, Spain, and India. The business units in Poland and Portugal were divested in 2018 and 2019, respectively.

- Wealth Management functions as the bank's private banking arm, serving high-net-worth individuals and families worldwide. The division has a presence in the world's private banking hotspots, including Switzerland, Luxembourg, the Channel Islands, the Cayman Islands and Dubai.

=== Deutsche Asset Management (DWS) ===
Deutsche Bank holds a majority stake in the listed asset manager DWS Group (formerly Deutsche Asset Management), which was separated from the bank in March 2018.

=== Operations in China ===
Deutsche Bank opened its first overseas office in Shanghai in 1872. Its locally incorporated, wholly owned subsidiary, Deutsche Bank (China) Co., Ltd., began operating on 1 January 2008 with headquarters in Beijing, after approval by the China Banking Regulatory Commission; it has branches in Beijing, Shanghai, Guangzhou, Tianjin, Chongqing and Qingdao.

The bank acquired a 19.5% stake in Harvest Fund Management in 2005 and raised it to 30% in 2008. In 2009 it formed Zhong De Securities, a securities joint venture with Shanxi Securities in which it held 33.3% as of 2021. In January 2022, Chinese exchanges suspended dozens of IPO applications while regulators investigated Zhong De and other intermediaries over their work for Leshi Internet. Deutsche Bank sold its 20% stake in Hua Xia Bank, first acquired in 2006, to PICC Property and Casualty in 2016 for about 23.2 billion yuan.

Qiu Yunping served as president of Deutsche Bank (China) from November 2020 until his resignation took effect on 1 May 2024; regulators approved Yin Zhen as his successor in October 2024.

== Controversies ==
Deutsche Bank in general as well as specific employees have frequently figured in controversies and allegations of deceitful behavior or illegal transactions. As of 2016, the bank was involved in some 7,800 legal disputes and calculated €5.4 billion as litigation reserves, with a further €2.2 billion held against other contingent liabilities. According to the New Yorker, Deutsche Bank has long had an "abject" reputation. Between 2008 and 2016, Deutsche Bank paid around nine billion dollars in fines and settlements related to wrongdoings across different issue areas. The FinCEN file leaks documented around $1.3 trillion of suspicious transactions through Deutsche Bank between 1999 and 2017. More than half of all suspicious transactions involving major banks in the FinCEN files leaks involved Deutsche Bank.

=== Banking for Donald Trump, 1995–2021 ===
Deutsche Bank is widely recognized as being the largest creditor to real-estate mogul and politician Donald Trump, 45th & current President of the United States, lending him and his company more than $2 billion over twenty years ending 2020. The bank held more than $360 million in outstanding loans to him prior to his 2016 election. Although his 2019 final report never mentioned Deutsche Bank, as of December 2017, Special Counsel Robert Mueller investigated Deutsche Bank's role in Trump and Russian parties allegedly cooperating to elect him. As of March 2019, Deutsche Bank's relationship with Trump was also under investigation by two U.S. congressional committees and by the New York attorney general.

In April 2019, House Democrats subpoenaed the Bank for Trump's personal and financial records. On 29 April 2019, U.S. President Donald Trump, his business, and his children Donald Trump Jr., Eric Trump, and Ivanka Trump sued Deutsche Bank and Capital One bank to block them from turning over financial records to congressional committees. On 22 May 2019, judge Edgardo Ramos of the federal District Court in Manhattan rejected the Trump suit against Deutsche Bank, ruling the bank must comply with congressional subpoenas. Six days later, Ramos granted Trump's attorneys their request for a stay so they could pursue an expedited appeal through the courts. In October 2019, a federal appeals court said the bank asserted it did not have Trump's tax returns. In December 2019, the Second Circuit Court of Appeals ruled that Deutsche Bank must release Trump's financial records, with some exceptions, to congressional committees; Trump was given seven days to seek another stay pending a possible appeal to the Supreme Court.

In May 2019, The New York Times reported that anti-money laundering specialists in the bank detected what appeared to be suspicious transactions involving entities controlled by Trump and his son-in-law Jared Kushner, for which they recommended filing suspicious activity reports with the Financial Crimes Enforcement Network of the Treasury Department, but bank executives rejected the recommendations. One specialist noted money moving from Kushner Companies to Russian individuals and flagged it in part because of the bank's previous involvement in a Russian money-laundering scheme.

On 19 November 2019, Thomas Bowers, a former Deutsche Bank executive and head of the American wealth management division, was reported to have committed suicide in his Malibu home. Bowers had been in charge of overseeing and personally signing over $360 million in high-risk loans for Trump's National Doral Miami resort. The loans had been subject to a criminal investigation by special counsel Robert Mueller in his investigation of the president's 2016 campaign involvement in Russian election meddling. Documents on those loans have also been subpoenaed from Deutsche Bank by the House Democrats together with the financial documents of the president. A relationship between Bowers's responsibilities and apparent suicide has not been established; the Los Angeles County Medical Examiner – Coroner closed the case, giving no indication to wrongdoing by third parties. In early 2021, Deutsche Bank elected to discontinue its relationship with Trump following the January 6 United States Capitol attack.

=== Role in the 2008 financial crisis ===
In December 2016, Deutsche Bank agreed to a $7.2 billion settlement with the United States Department of Justice over its sale and pooling of toxic mortgage securities in the years leading up to the 2008 financial crisis. As part of the agreement, Deutsche Bank was required to pay a civil monetary penalty of $3.1 billion and provide $4.1 billion in consumer relief, such as loan forgiveness. At the time of the agreement, Deutsche Bank was still facing investigations into the alleged manipulation of foreign exchange rates, suspicious equities trades in Russia, as well as alleged violations of United States sanctions against Iran and other countries. Since 2012, Deutsche Bank had paid more than €12 billion for litigation, including a deal with U.S. mortgage-finance giants Fannie Mae and Freddie Mac.

=== Espionage scandal, 2009 ===
In 2009, the bank admitted it engaged in covert espionage on its critics from 2001 to 2007 directed by its corporate security department, although it characterized the incidents as "isolated". According to The Wall Street Journal, Deutsche Bank had prepared a list of names of people who it wanted investigated for criticism of the bank, including Michael Bohndorf (an activist investor in the bank), Leo Kirch (a former media executive in litigation with the bank), and the Munich law firm of Bub Gauweiler & Partner, which represented Kirch. According to the Wall Street Journal, the bank's legal department was involved in the scheme along with its corporate security department. The bank hired Cleary Gottlieb Steen & Hamilton to investigate the incidents on its behalf. The Cleary firm submitted its report, which however was not made public. According to The Wall Street Journal, the Cleary firm uncovered a plan by which Deutsche Bank was to infiltrate the Bub Gauweiler firm by having a bank mole hired as an intern at the Bub Gauweiler firm. The plan was allegedly cancelled after the intern was hired but before she started work. Peter Gauweiler, a principal at the targeted law firm, was quoted as saying "I expect the appropriate authorities including state prosecutors and the bank's oversight agencies will conduct a full investigation."

Deutsche Bank's law firm Cleary Gottlieb Steen & Hamilton in Frankfurt published a report in July 2009 saying, it found no systemic misbehaviour and there was no indication that present members of the management board had been involved in any activity that raises legal issues or has had any knowledge of such activities. This was confirmed by the Public Prosecutor's Office in Frankfurt in October 2009. BaFin found deficiencies in operations within Deutsche Bank's security unit in Germany but no systemic misconduct. The bank said it took steps to strengthen controls for the mandating of external service providers by its Corporate Security Department.

=== Deutsche Bank document release, 2014 ===
On 26 January 2014, William S. Broeksmit, a risk specialist at Deutsche Bank who was very close to Anshu Jain and hired by Edson Mitchell to spearhead Deutsche Bank's foray into international investments and money management in the 1990s, released numerous Deutsche Bank documents from the New York branch of the Deutsche Bank Trust Company Americas (DBTCA), which Broeksmit's adopted son Val Broeksmit, who is a close friend of Moby, later gave, along with numerous emails, to both Welt am Sonntag and ZDF, which revealed numerous irregularities including both a $10 billion money laundering scheme spearheaded by the Russia branch of Deutsche Bank at Moscow, which the New York State Department of Financial Services fined Deutsche Bank $425 million, and derivatives improprieties. (Note: Val Broeksmit (b. 1976, Ukraine) emigrated to Chicago in 1979 with his parents Alexander and Alla. Later, after his mother divorced his father and married Bill Broeksmit, he was adopted by Broeksmit when he was 9. Adam Schiff subpoenaed Val Broeksmit for the Broeksmit materials about Deutsche Bank to begin House of Representatives investigations into Trump and Deutsche Bank.)

=== Libor scandal, 2015 ===
On 23 April 2015, Deutsche Bank agreed to a combined US$2.5 billion in fines – a US$2.175 billion fine by American regulators, and a €227 million penalty by British authorities – for its involvement in the Libor scandal uncovered in June 2012. It was one of several banks colluding to fix interest rates used to price hundreds of trillions of dollars of loans and contracts worldwide, including mortgages and student loans. Deutsche Bank also pleaded guilty to wire fraud, acknowledging that at least 29 employees had engaged in illegal activity. It was required to dismiss all employees who were involved with the fraudulent transactions. However, no individuals were charged with criminal wrongdoing. In a Libor first, Deutsche Bank will be required to install an independent monitor. Commenting on the fine, Britain's Financial Conduct Authority director Georgina Philippou said "This case stands out for the seriousness and duration of the breaches ... One division at Deutsche Bank had a culture of generating profits without proper regard to the integrity of the market. This wasn't limited to a few individuals but, on certain desks, it appeared deeply ingrained." The fine represented a record for interest rate related cases, eclipsing a $1.5 billion Libor related fine to UBS, and the then-record $450 million fine assessed to Barclays earlier in the case. The size of the fine reflected the breadth of wrongdoing at Deutsche Bank, the bank's poor oversight of traders, and its failure to take action when it uncovered signs of abuse internally.

=== U.S. sanctions violations, 2015 ===
On 5 November 2015, Deutsche Bank was ordered to pay US$258 million (€237.2 million) in penalties imposed by the New York State Department of Financial Services (NYDFS) and the United States Federal Reserve Bank after the bank was caught doing business with Burma, Libya, Sudan, Iran, and Syria, which were under US sanctions at the time. According to the US federal authorities, Deutsche Bank handled 27,200 US dollar clearing transactions valued at more than US$10.86 billion (€9.98 billion) to help evade US sanctions between early 1999 until 2006 which were done on behalf of Iranian, Libyan, Syrian, Burmese, and Sudanese financial institutions and other entities subject to US sanctions, including entities on the Specially Designated Nationals by the Office of Foreign Assets Control. In response to the penalties, the bank will pay US$200 million (€184 million) to the NYDFS while the rest (US$58 million; €53.3 million) will go to the Federal Reserve. In addition to the payment, the bank will install an independent monitor, fire six employees who were involved in the incident, and ban three other employees from any work involving the bank's US-based operations.

=== Tax evasion, 2016 ===
In June 2016 six former employees in Germany were accused of being involved in a major tax fraud deal with CO_{2} emission certificates, and most of them were subsequently convicted. It was estimated that the sum of money in the tax evasion scandal might have been as high as €850 million. Deutsche Bank itself was not convicted due to an absence of corporate liability laws in Germany.

=== Russian money-laundering operations, 1990s −2017 ===
In January 2017, the bank was fined $425 million by the New York State Department of Financial Services (DFS) and £163 million by the UK Financial Conduct Authority regarding accusations of laundering $10 billion out of Russia. In the decade preceding the Russian mirror-trading scheme, Deutsche Bank was informed of substantial and widespread compliance concerns. The offsetting trades in this instance lacked economic purpose and could have been used to facilitate money laundering or other illegal activity. On 30 January 2017, the NYSDFS (New York State Department of Financial Services) fined Deutsche Bank $425 million for violating New York's anti-money laundering laws. There was a "mirror trading" scheme involved. Deutsche Bank's Moscow, London, and New York branches laundered $10 billion out of Russia.

The Global Laundromat scandal revealed Deutsche Bank's involvement in a vast money-laundering operation over the period 2010–2014. The operation may have involved as much as $80 billion. In 2019, The Guardian reported that a confidential internal report at Deutsche Bank showed that the bank could face fines, legal action, and even possible prosecution of senior management over the bank's role in the money laundering. In 2020, it was reported that Deutsche Bank was pursuing an expansion of its Russia operations. In the wake of Russia's 2022 invasion of Ukraine, Deutsche Bank refused to close down its Russia business. At the same time, other banks and major businesses were exiting Russia. In June 2023, the bank notified customers that it could no longer guarantee them access to the shares they hold on the basis of depositary receipts issued prior to February 2022. He explained this by the shortage of shares in the Russian depository. The bank also warned that it would be able to return the funds for the share significantly below the market price.

=== Fine for business with Jeffrey Epstein, 2020 ===
For decades, Deutsche Bank lent money and traded currencies for multimillionaire Jeffrey Epstein up to May 2019, long after his 2008 guilty plea in Florida to soliciting prostitution from underage girls, according to news reports. Epstein and his businesses had dozens of accounts through the private-banking division. From 2013 to 2018, "Epstein, his related entities and his associates" had opened over forty accounts with Deutsche Bank. This occurred after JPMorgan had stopped doing business with Epstein in 2013.

According to The New York Times, Deutsche Bank managers overruled compliance officers who raised concerns about Epstein's reputation. The bank found suspicious transactions in which Epstein moved money out of the United States, The Times reported. In July 2020, the New York Department of Financial Services (DFS) imposed a $150 million penalty on Deutsche Bank, in connection with Epstein. The bank had "ignored red flags on Epstein". Later that month, the son and husband of the judge involved in the trial were shot by a gunman posing as a FedEx driver, with the son dying of his injuries. In November 2022, two unnamed women who had accused Epstein of sexual abuse and sex trafficking sued Deutsche Bank for its role in enabling Epstein to run his sex-trafficking operations by ignoring red flags regarding his account and the withdrawal of suspiciously high sums of money.

=== Involvement in Danske Bank money-laundering scandal, 2018 ===
On 19 November 2018, a whistleblower of the Danske Bank money laundering scandal stated that a large European bank was involved in helping Danske process $150 billion in suspect funds. Although the whistleblower, Howard Wilkinson, did not name Deutsche Bank directly, another inside source claimed the institute in question was Deutsche Bank's U.S. unit. In 2020 it became known that the U.S. arm of Deutsche Bank processed more than $150 billion of the $230 billion dirty money through New York, for which it was fined 150 million $. After a raid in 2019, Frankfurt-based prosecutors imposed a fine of $15.8 million in 2020 for DB's failure on more than 600 occasions to promptly report suspicious transactions.

=== Improper handling of ADRs, 2018 ===
On 20 July 2018, Deutsche Bank agreed to pay nearly $75 million to settle charges of improper handling of "pre-released" American depositary receipt (ADRs) under investigation of the U.S. Securities and Exchange Commission (SEC). Deutsche Bank didn't admit or deny the investigation findings but agreed to pay disgorgement of more than $44.4 million in ill-gotten gains plus $6.6 million in prejudgment interest and a penalty of $22.2 million.

=== Malaysian 1MDB fund ===
In July 2019, U.S. prosecutors investigated Deutsche Bank's role in a multibillion-dollar fraud scandal involving the 1Malaysia Development Berhad, or 1MDB. Deutsche Bank helped raise $1.2 billion for the 1MDB in 2014. As of May 2021 Malaysia sued Deutsche Bank to recover billions in alleged losses from a corruption scandal at the fund.

=== Commodities trading, bribery fine, 2021 ===
In January 2021, Deutsche Bank agreed to pay a U.S. fine of more than $130 million for a scheme to conceal bribes to foreign officials in countries such as Saudi Arabia and China, and the city of Abu Dhabi, between 2008 and 2017 and a commodities case where it spoofed precious metals futures.

=== Strip club scandal, 2022 ===
In March 2022, Ben Darsney, Ravi Raghunathan, Brandon Sun, and Daniel Gaona were exposed for trying to list strip club nights out as legitimate business visit expenses. Brandon Sun attempted to cover up the incident, but the bankers were let go for violating the Company Code of Conduct.

=== Greenwashing, 2022 ===
On 31 May 2022, police in Germany raided the offices of Deutsche Bank in Frankfurt over allegations of greenwashing. In late July 2023, the Financial Times reported that DWS (80% owned by Deutsche Bank) which was also involved in the case was nearing a settlement having earmarked €21mn for the settlement and incurred €39mn in legal costs. DWS had made misleading statements about the size of its ESG assets and the employee who raised concerns was fired unfairly. Reuters composed a more extensive timeline highlighting how the issue developed over the course of several years including when the stock price fell sharply on news of a US SEC investigation and the resignation of the CEO.

=== Anti-competitive Bond Trading, 2005–2016 ===
In 2023, it was revealed that Deutsche Bank was involved in anti-competitive bond trading in UK and EU bonds. In Europe, Deutsche revealed cartel activities in the period between 2005 and 2016 to regulators to receive immunity. "Deutsche Bank would have been fined almost €156 million for its participation in the absence of immunity." In the UK, Deutsche also admitted to wrongdoing for the period 2009–2013 to the Competition and Markets Authority.

=== Potential funding of the Myanmar military, 2022 ===
According to an investigation by journalists, Josy Joseph and Khadija Sharife first published on South Africa-based Barracuda Media, two whistleblowers leaked internal documents from Deutsche Bank. Among the documents were January 2022 correspondences concerning an increase of Halliburton's bond guarantee for Zawtika Oil and Gas Field on behalf of PTTEP International Limited. Deutsche Bank sanctions advisors allegedly warned against the funding as the Tatmadaw-owned Myanma Oil and Gas Enterprise retained 20% of Zawtika's stake. Despite these concerns, the deal went through due to "client confirmation" that the money was not ending up in sanctioned hands. Within days of approval, a staff member stated the proposal "should have been rejected".

== Leadership ==
After Deutsche Bank was first organized in 1870, the Management Board was represented by a Speaker (German: Vorstandssprecher). Beginning in February 2012, the bank has been led by two co-CEOs; in July 2015 it announced it would be led by one CEO beginning in 2016.

- Hermann Josef Abs, Speaker of the Board 1957–1967
- Karl Klasen, co-Speaker of the Board 1967–1969
- Franz Heinrich Ulrich, co-Speaker of the Board 1967–1976
- Wilfried Guth, co-Speaker of the Board 1976–1985
- Friedrich Wilhelm Christians, co-Speaker of the Board 1976–1988
- Alfred Herrhausen, Speaker of the Board 1985–1989
- Hilmar Kopper, Speaker of the Board 1989–1997
- Rolf-Ernst Breuer, Speaker of the Board 1997–2002
- Josef Ackermann, Speaker of the Board (2002–2006), CEO 2006–2012
- Anshu Jain, co-CEO 2012–2015
- Jürgen Fitschen, co-CEO 2012–2016
- John Cryan, co-CEO 2015–2016, CEO 2016–2018
- Christian Sewing, CEO since 2018

Other notable employees and officers have included:

- Paul Achleitner, long-time chairman of the supervisory board
- Michael Cohrs, former head of Global Banking (2002–2010)
- Sir John Craven – financier in London
- David Folkerts-Landau, head of Research
- Katherine Garrett-Cox, supervisory board member
- Henry Jackson – founder of OpCapita
- Sajid Javid, former managing-director (2007–2009)
- Josh Frydenberg, former director of global banking (2005)
- Otto Hermann Kahn – philanthropist
- Karl Kimmich, former chair (1942–1945)
- Philip May, spouse of a former prime minister of the United Kingdom
- Steven Reich – CEO of Deutsche Bank Trust Company Americas, associate deputy attorney general (2011–2013)
- Georg von Siemens, co-founder and director (1870–1900)
- Georg Solmssen, former chair (short time 1933)
- Johannes Teyssen, (chair of the management board of E.ON)
- Ted Virtue – executive board member
- Hermann Wallich, co-founder and director (1870–1893)
- Boaz Weinstein – derivatives trader
- Chandra Wilson – actress
- Rainer Neske – CEO of LBBW

== See also ==
- Cash Group
- List of largest banks
- List of corporate collapses and scandals
- List of banks in the euro area
- List of banks in Germany

== Sources ==
- David Enrich, Dark Towers: Deutsche Bank, Donald Trump, and an Epic Trail of Destruction, Custom House (2020) ISBN 978-0-06-287881-6 – The story of Deutsche Bank.
