= John Cryan =

British businessman

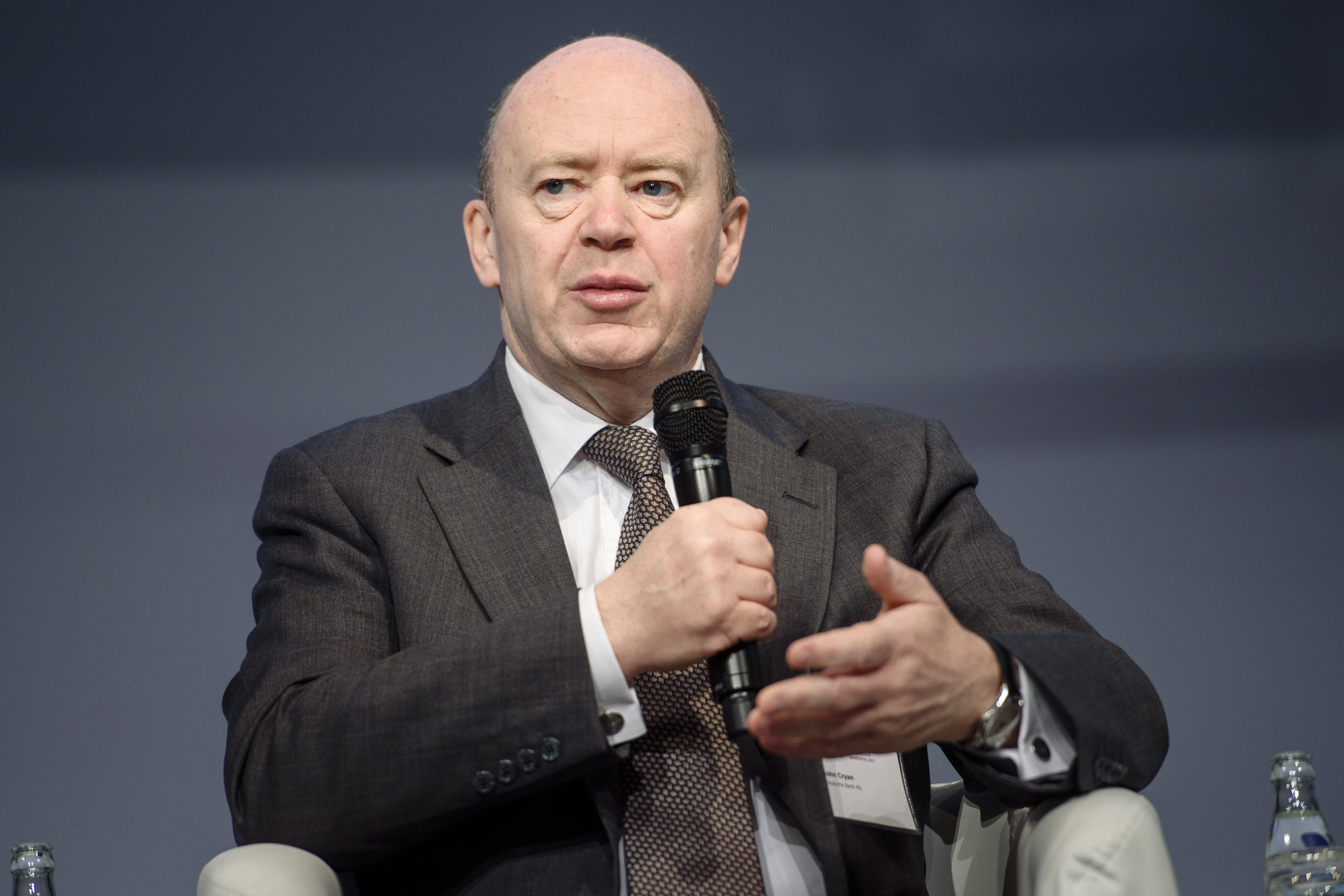
- John Cryan, 2017
- Born: John Michael Cryan; 16 December 1960 (age 65); Sunderland, UK
- Education: Cambridge University
- Occupation: Banker
- Title: Former CEO, Deutsche Bank
- Term: 2015-18
- Successor: Christian Sewing
- Spouse: Mary Cryan

John Michael Cryan (born 16 December 1960) is a British businessman. From July 2015 to April 2018 he was chief executive of Deutsche Bank AG in Frankfurt am Main.

== Early life ==
John Michael Cryan was born on 16 December 1960 in Sunderland. He is a graduate of the University of Cambridge.

== Career ==
Cryan worked for Arthur Andersen and then joined S.G. Warburg in London in 1987, before he was appointed group chief financial officer at UBS AG in September 2008. Cryan was head of UBS's financial institutions group. In the autumn of 2008, he advised the UBS board of directors on the financial crisis.

In 2011, Cryan left UBS for personal reasons. In January 2012, he joined Singapore's investment company Temasek as president for Europe. Cryan became a non-executive director of Man Group in January 2015.

Cryan was appointed co-chief executive officer of Deutsche Bank in June 2015, a position he shared with Jürgen Fitschen until May 2016, when he became sole CEO.

On 8 April 2018, Cryan was replaced by Christian Sewing as chief executive at Deutsche Bank. In April 2019, Cryan became a director at X Cyber Group LTD in the UK. In September, it was announced that he would succeed Ian Livingston as chairman of Man Group.

== Personal life ==
Cryan and his wife Mary purchased a home in Annapolis, Maryland, US, in 2009. They have a home in London as well, and no children. He speaks German fluently.
