= Alexander Wynaendts =

Dutch businessman (born 1960)

- Born: Alexander Rijn Wynaendts; 1 August 1960 (age 65); Almelo, Netherlands
- Education: Sorbonne University
- Occupation: Businessman
- Known for: CEO of Aegon (2008–2020), Chairman of the Supervisory Board of Deutsche Bank (2022–present)
- Parent: Henry Wijnaendts

Alexander Rijn Wynaendts (born 1 August 1960) is a Dutch businessman who was CEO and chairman of the board of Aegon N.V. from 2008 until 2020. In May 2022 he was elected chairman of the supervisory board of Deutsche Bank AG.

== Early life ==
Wynaendts was born on 1 August 1960 in Almelo. His father Henry Wijnaendts was a longtime Dutch diplomat who was Ambassador to France from 1989 to 1997.

Wynaendts attended French schools in Beirut, Jakarta and Brussels. He graduated from École Supérieure d’Electricité in Paris in 1984 and also obtained a degree in economics at the University of La Sorbonne Paris in 1984.

== Career ==
Wynaendts began his career with ABN AMRO in 1984, working in the bank's private banking and investment banking operations in both Amsterdam and London.

Prior to being appointed as CEO of Aegon, Wynaendts held a number of different positions within the company, beginning in 1997 in Group Business Development. In particular, he established and expanded Aegon's presence in new markets in Asia such as China, Hong Kong, India and Japan, as well as the fast-developing region of Central and Eastern Europe. Wynaendts joined Aegon's executive board in 2003 and was appointed Chief Operating Officer in 2007.

Following his appointment as CEO in May 2008, Wynaendts led Aegon through the 2008 financial crisis. He also led a series of disposals in an effort to streamline the business, including the 2011 sale of Transamerica Corporation to French reinsurer SCOR for $900 million.

In May 2020, Wynaendts retired after 12 years as CEO of Aegon.

In May 2022, Wynaendts was elected chairman of the supervisory board of Deutsche Bank AG. He was seen as an outsider, but he quickly gained the respect of insiders and investors.

== Other activities ==
=== Corporate boards ===
- Air France–KLM, Member of the Board of Directors (since 2016)
- Uber Technologies, Member of the Board of Directors (since 2021)
- Citigroup, Member of the Board of Directors (2019–2021)
- Salesforce, Member of the advisory board on Europe, the Middle East and Africa (2020–2023)

=== Non-profit organizations ===
- Rijksmuseum, chairman of the supervisory board (since 2018)
- De Hoge Veluwe National Park, Member of the supervisory board (since 2020)

== Personal life ==
Wynaendts lives in The Netherlands. He is married to Caroline André de la Porte, an artist, and has two children.
