= Dresdner Bank =

German bank (1872–2009)

Dresdner Bank AG
- Logo in the 2000s

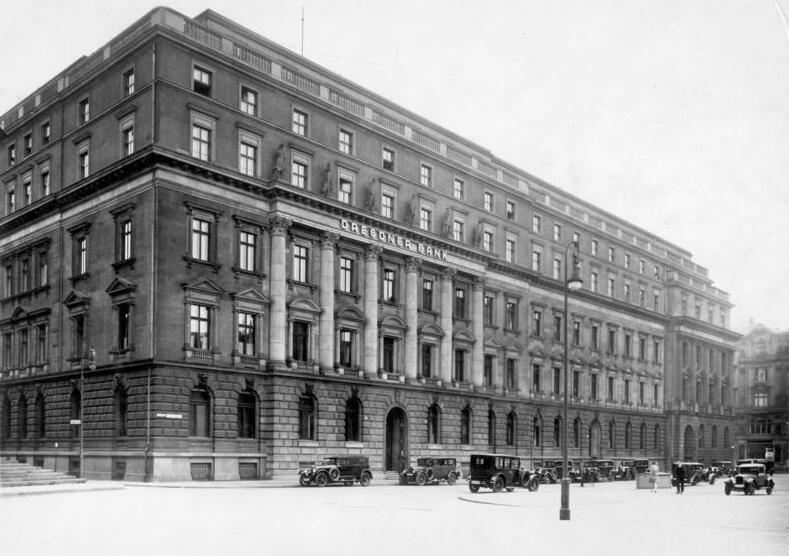
- 1926 view of the Dresdner Bank head office on the Bebelplatz in Berlin (1889–1945), later Deutsche Notenbank (1953–1968), Staatsbank der DDR (1968–1990), and a luxury hotel since 2006
- Type: Aktiengesellschaft
- Industry: Financial services
- Predecessor: Böhmische Escompte-Bank; Danat-Bank
- Founded: November 12, 1872
- Founder: Eugen Gutmann
- Defunct: May 2009
- Fate: Acquired by Commerzbank
- Successor: Commerzbank
- Headquarters: Frankfurt, Germany
- Products: Retail, commercial and commercial real estate banking
- Parent: Commerzbank
- Website: www.dresdner-bank.com (redirects to Commerzbank)

Dresdner Bank AG (German pronunciation: [ˈdʁeːsdnɐ ˈbaŋk]) was a German bank, founded in 1872 in Dresden, then headquartered in Berlin from 1884 to 1945 and in Frankfurt from 1963 onwards after a postwar hiatus. Long Germany's second-largest bank behind Deutsche Bank, it was eventually acquired by Commerzbank in May 2009.

== History ==
=== 1872-1933 ===
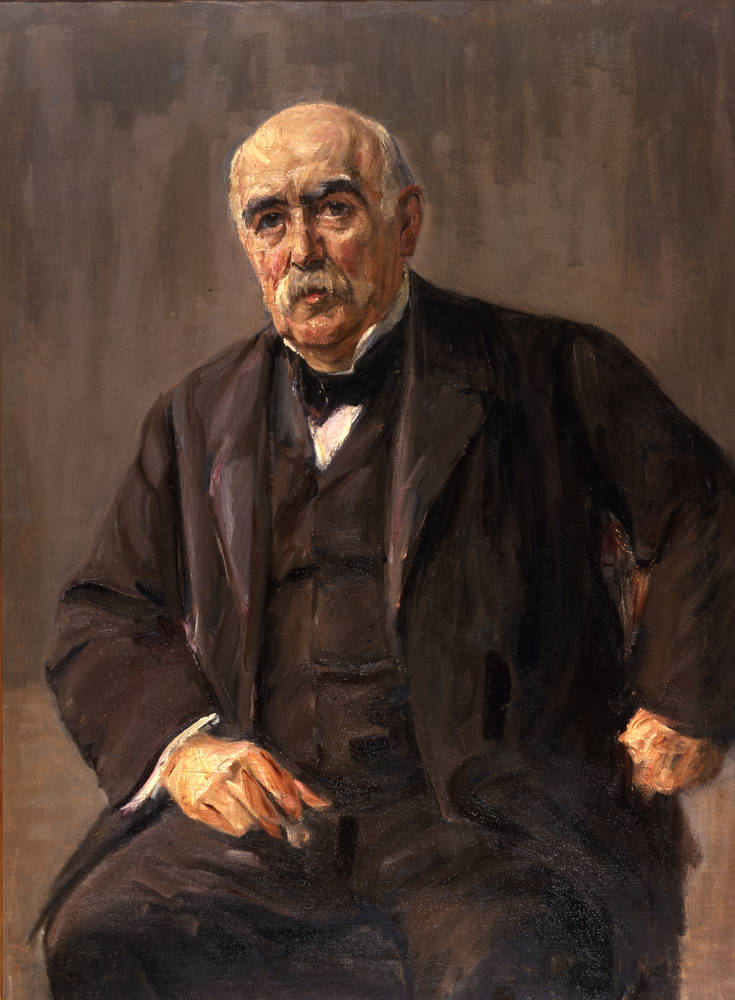
Eugen Gutmann (1840–1925), founder of Dresdner Bank, 1907 portrait by Max Liebermann

The Dresdner Bank was established on 12 November 1872 through the conversion of Bankhaus Kaskel, a Dresden-based private bank founded in 1771, on the advice of banker Eugen Gutmann. The bank's founding consortium of investors consisted of Allgemeine Deutsche Credit-Anstalt (Leipzig), Berliner Handels-Gesellschaft (Berlin), Deutsche Vereinsbank (Frankfurt), Deutsche Effecten- und Wechselbank (Frankfurt) and Anglo-Deutsche Bank (Hamburg), with an initial capital of 8 million Thalers (24 million Marks) and 30 employees in Wilsdruffer Strasse in Dresden. Gutmann became chairman of the new entity's board and led it until his retirement in 1920.

In the 1870s, the Dresdner Bank acquired smaller regional institutes and several banks. In 1881, it opened a branch in Berlin, whose activity quickly exceeded the nominal head office in Dresden. Therefore, the registered office moved to Berlin in 1884, while the place of jurisdiction remained in Dresden until 1950. In 1889, together with Deutsche Bank and others, the Dresdner Bank participated in the creation of Deutsch-Asiatische Bank in Shanghai, and in 1894 of Banca Commerciale Italiana in Milan. It also developed its own overseas-oriented network by opening branches in Hamburg (1892, when it absorbed the Anglo-Deutsche Bank), Bremen (1895), and London (1901).

In 1905 Dresdner formed a close alliance with J. P. Morgan & Co. of New York, for joint action in international finance and issue operations, particularly the absorption of American securities by German investors. Operations in the orient and South America were carried on jointly in cooperation with the A. Schaaffhausen'scher Bankverein, including the establishment in 1905 of Deutsche Orientbank which also involved the Nationalbank für Deutschland.

By end-1908, Dresdner Bank was the second-largest German joint-stock bank by total deposits, with a total of 225 million Marks surpassed only by Deutsche Bank (489 million) and well ahead of Disconto-Gesellschaft (219 million) and Darmstädter Bank (109 million). At that time, Dresdner Bank was referred to as one of the four "D-Banks" (all of which had names starting with a D) that dominated German commercial banking, together with Darmstädter Bank, Deutsche Bank, and Disconto-Gesellschaft.

During the First World War, the London branch was forced to close; however, the branch network itself expanded.

By 1930, Dresdner Bank was Germany's third-largest joint-stock bank by total deposits with 2.3 billion Reichsmarks, behind Deutsche Bank und Disconto-Gesellschaft (4.8 billion) and Danat-Bank (2.4 billion), and ahead of Commerz- und Privatbank (1.5 billion), Reichs-Kredit-Gesellschaft (619 million), and Berliner Handels-Gesellschaft (412 million).

As a consequence of state intervention during the banking crisis of 1931, the German Reich owned 66% and Deutsche Golddiskontbank owned 22% of Dresdner Bank shares; the total government stake in Dresdner Bank reached 97 percent, and (unlike at Deutsche Bank) resulted in significant interference in the bank's management. As part of the same restructuring, Dresdner Bank acquired full ownership of the former Danat-Bank, of Mercurbank in Vienna, and of Deutsche Orientbank in Istanbul. Its deputy director was Hjalmar Schacht, soon-to-be Minister of Economy under Nazism.

=== 1933-1945 ===
Following Adolf Hitler's assumption of power in 1933, the Dresdner Bank, which had been founded by a Jewish banker, Eugen Gutmann, fired all 600 Jewish employees, including board members as well as bank clerks, and cancelled or confiscated their pensions. In May 1933, "Nazi brownshirts swarmed into the lobby of the Dresdner headquarters and smashed the bronze bust of Eugen to the ground." The bank was declared "Judenrein" ("cleansed" of Jews) and became a tool of Hitler's Nazi regime.

The "Aryanized" bank fully participated in the Nazi regime's aryanization of Jewish businesses and became known as the bank of choice for Heinrich Himmler's SS. As with other banks that had been nationalized to various degrees in 1931, Dresdner Bank was reprivatised in stages in 1936-1937.

After the Nazi Anschluss in 1938, Dresdner Bank on 15 June 1938 acquired ownership of Vienna-based Länderbank through its local subsidiary the Mercurbank, in a transaction forced under duress. The Prague-based Živnostenská Banka's Austrian subsidiary was simultaneously subsumed in the merged entity, renamed Länderbank Wien AG. The new Länderbank had 33 branch offices in Vienna (36 after acquisition of the Austrian business of Società Italiana di Credito in 1939), in comparison to 24 for the rival Creditanstalt-Bankverein that had come under control of Deutsche Bank.

Later in 1938 following the Nazi annexation of the Sudetenland, Dresdner Bank, through Länderbank Wien, took over the former branches of the Böhmische Escompte-Bank in the South Moravian towns of Břeclav (German: Lundenburg), Mikulov (German: Nikolsburg) and Znojmo (German: Znaim). In subsequent years, most of the Länderbank's resources were used to finance the Nazi war effort, while in March 1939, Dresdner Bank acquired control of Böhmische Escompte-Bank.

During World War II, Dresdner Bank took over the Böhmische Escompte-Bank in Prague, the Societatea Bancară Română in Bucharest, the Handels- und Kreditbank in Riga, and the Kontinentale Bank in Brussels. It also maintained majority control of the Kommerzialbank in Kraków, Deutsche Handels- und Kreditbank in Bratislava, Banque Bulgare de Commerce in Sofia, and founded the Handelstrust West N. V. in Amsterdam. Following the invasion of Yugoslavia and proclamation of the Independent State of Croatia, Dresdner Bank took a 53 percent stake in Jugoslavenska Banka, renamed Kroatische Landesbank by court order of 3 June 1941. Also in 1941, Dresdner Bank took over management control of the Bank of Athens during the Axis occupation of Greece, without however taking ownership out of consideration for Italian sensitivities. In September 1941, Dresdner Bank appropriated a block of shares owned by Union Européenne Industrielle et Financière, an affiliate of the French Schneider-Creusot group, in the Hungarian General Credit Bank.

Dresdner Bank helped to finance concentration camps, including Auschwitz. The bank was closely involved in the occupation of Europe, "essentially acting as the bank of the SS in Poland".

As a result of World War II 80% of the bank's buildings were destroyed, costing the bank 162 offices in 56 locations.

=== 1945-2002 ===
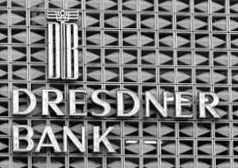
Dresdner Bank logo on a branch in Cologne, 1965

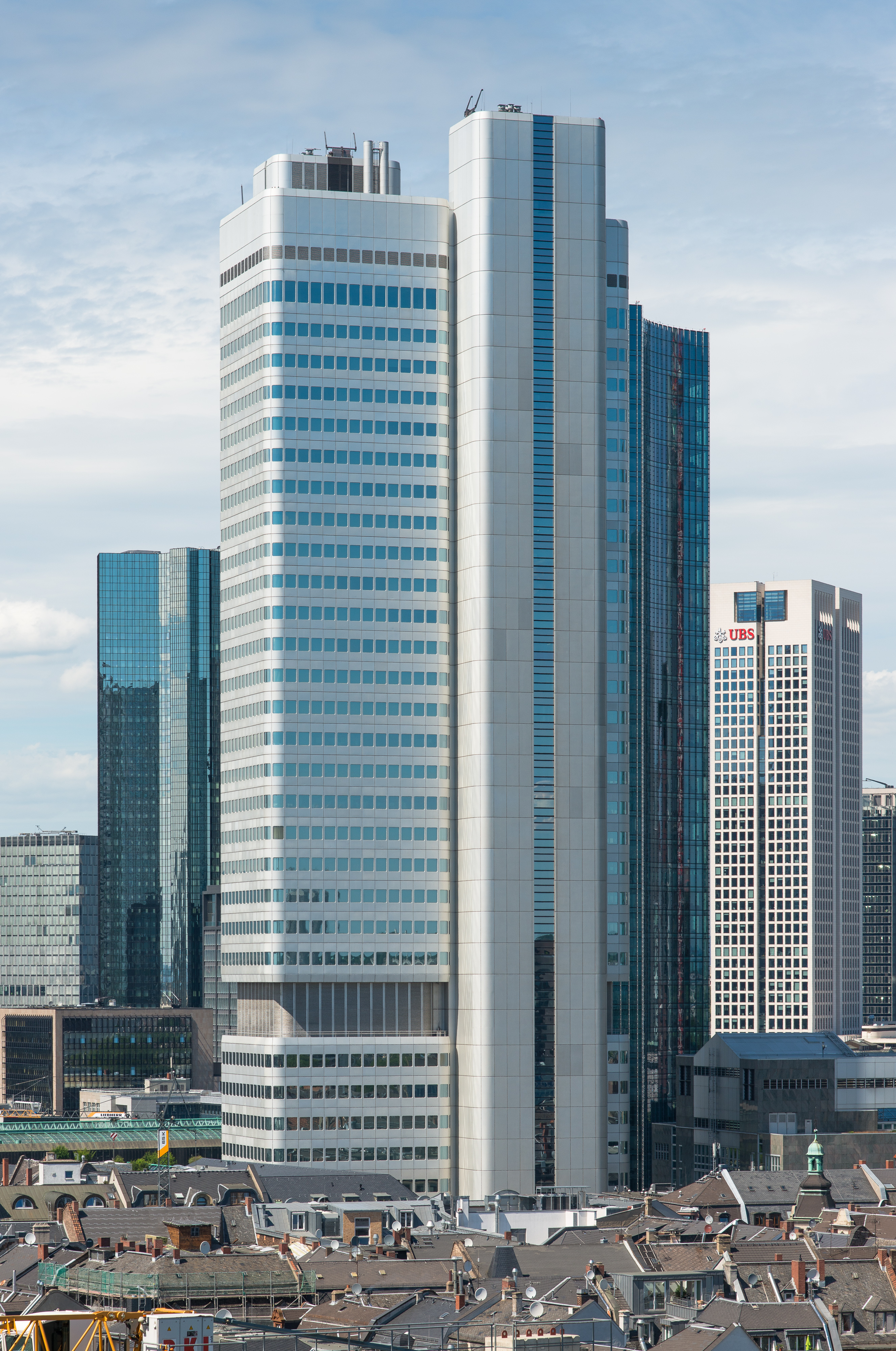
The 1978 Silberturm was part of the head office of Dresdner Bank.

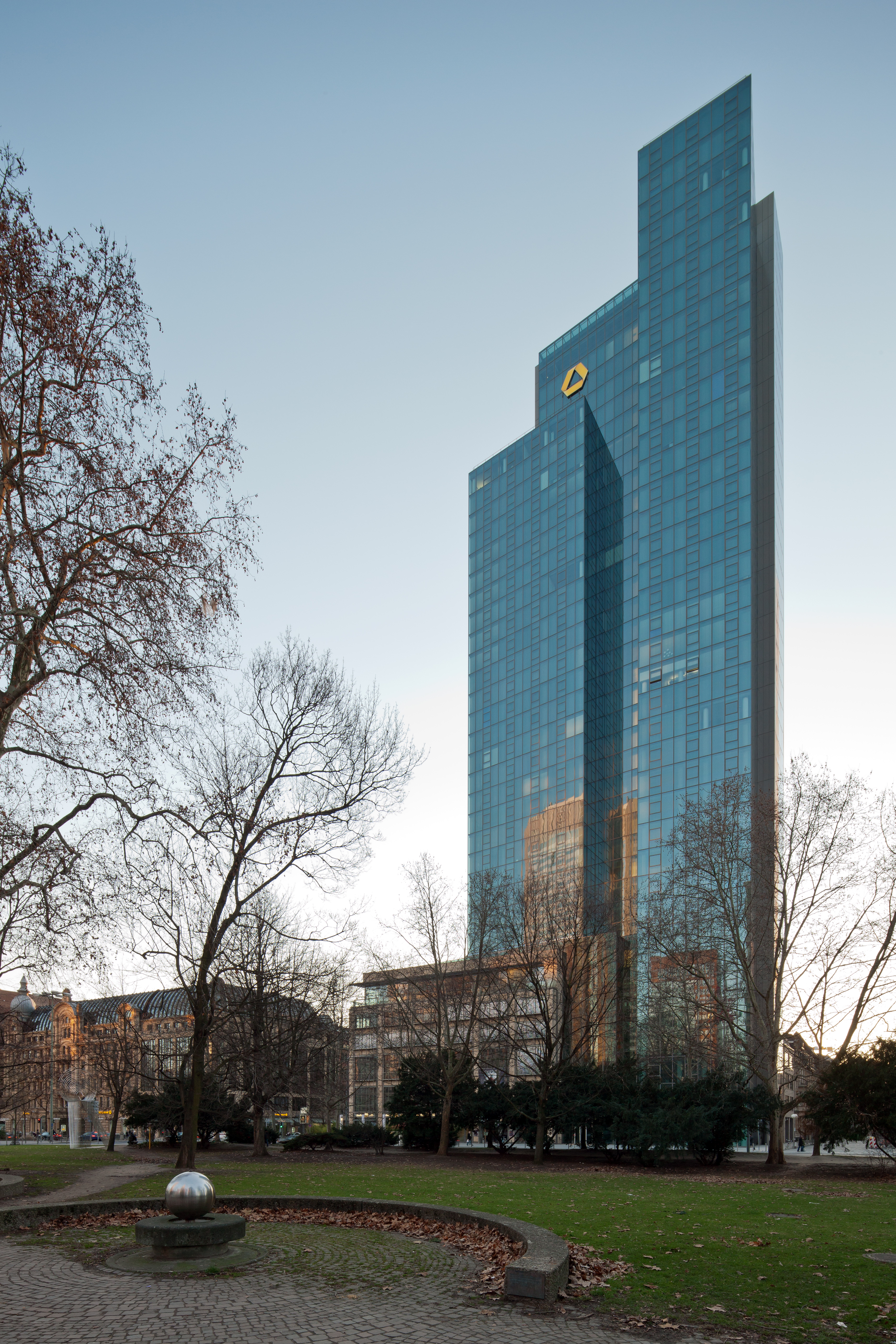
The Gallileo building in Frankfurt, completed in 2003, was part of the head office of Dresdner Bank until the 2009 merger.

Following the end of World War II in Europe, the chairman of the bank's supervisory board, Carl Goetz, was arrested by the American occupation forces and held in custody until late 1947. Karl Rasche, the bank's former chief executive (German: Vorstandssprecher) since 1942, was tried at Nuremberg and sentenced to seven years' imprisonment. The Deutsche Orientbank, Dresdner Bank's Turkish subsidiary, was liquidated in 1946.

On 30 July 1977 in Oberursel (Taunus), Jürgen Ponto, the chairman of the board of directors of Dresdner Bank, was shot in his home during an attempted kidnapping by the RAF. Ponto later died from his injuries.

Dresdner Bank expanded its network with acquisition and opening new offices not only in Europe but also in the United States, Singapore, Canada, Australia, Japan, Hong Kong, and China. Dresdner Bank was the first to open its own office in former eastern Germany in Dresden on 2 January 1990. In the year 1991 the majority of the deposit-taking business (especially corporate and retail banking), as well as a number of branch buildings and locations, were taken from the Deutsche Kreditbank together with the Deutsche Bank in the course of the currency union, and ran until 1993 under Dresdner Bank Kreditbank AG and Deutsche Bank Kreditbank AG until 1994.

After the acquisition of Kleinwort Benson in 1995 to form its investment-banking arm Dresdner Kleinwort, Dresdner Bank took over the American investment bank Wasserstein Perella Group Inc., New York in 2000. This investment banking unit was then renamed Dresdner Kleinwort Wasserstein.

In 1999, Dresdner Bank and Banque Nationale de Paris (BNP) proposed a merger but Allianz, a major shareholder of Dresdner Bank, opposed the merger. AXA, a major shareholder in BNP, is a rival of Allianz.

=== Partnership with BNP ===
Starting in 1988, Dresdner Bank explored a partnership with Banque Nationale de Paris which was favored by the latter's president René Thomas. This materialized in the 1990s with the creation of several 50-50 joint ventures in the central and eastern European countries undergoing post-Communist transition: first in Hungary (1990), then in Czechoslovakia and Russia (1991), Poland (1994), Bulgaria (1995), Croatia (1997), and Romania (1998). The Russian joint venture supported a Dresdner Bank branch in Saint Petersburg and had Matthias Warnig, a former East German Stasi officer and associate of Vladimir Putin, as its chairman. In late 1998, BNP and Dresdner Bank brought the joint ventures under a jointly owned holding company based in Vienna, Austria. Beyond these regional initiatives, BNP and Dresdner in 1996 signed a broader partnership, which led analysts in the late 1990s to anticipate closer integration between the two institutions.

The partnership, which had never been as popular in France as in Germany, was unwound in the wake of the merger between BNP and Paribas in 1999-2000. In August 2000, Greece's Egnatia Bank acquired the Romanian joint venture. Dresdner and the newly formed BNP Paribas then divided the other joint-venture banks between themselves: BNP Paribas bought out Dresdner in Bulgaria (with 20 percent still owned by the European Bank for Reconstruction and Development), Hungary, and Poland, whereas Dresdner bought out BNP Paribas in Croatia, Czechia, and Russia. In October 2002, the two banks amicably terminated their broader partnership agreement of 1996.

The former joint ventures met various fates. BNP Paribas expanded significantly in Poland with the acquisition of BGZ Bank in 2015, and retained a comparatively smaller-scale activity in both Bulgaria and Hungary, where it ranked 19th in the country by assets by end-2023. Dresdner sold its Croatian subsidiary to Zagrebačka banka in 2005, then was itself acquired by Commerzbank in 2008-2009, which merged the two respective Russian subsidiaries in 2010. Following the Russian invasion of Ukraine in 2022, Commerzbank sharply reduced its exposure in the country, stopped servicing payments in Russia in 2023, and by 2025 was still reducing its legacy operations there. As of 2025, Commerzbank retained the former Dresdner Bank's presence in Czechia. The former Romanian joint venture undertook several cycles of restructuring by which it was successively renamed Egnatia Bank Romania (2001) then Marfin Bank Romania (2008), and has been known as Vista Bank since 2019.

=== Takeover by Allianz ===
In 2002 Dresdner Bank became a wholly owned subsidiary of the insurance corporation Allianz. In July 2006 Dresdner Kleinwort, dropped Wasserstein from its name and went through a re-organization of corporate bank, capital markets and investment bank. The arm made up of capital markets and investment banking.

In 2008 it was reported that Allianz was looking to dispose of Dresdner Bank. British banking group Lloyds TSB were amongst those rumoured to be interested. However, by July that year Lloyds TSB had denied any interest in making a bid.

=== Takeover by Commerzbank ===
On August 31, 2008, Commerzbank announced that it would acquire Dresdner Bank for EUR 9.8 billion. Dresdner Bank was legally merged with Commerzbank on 11 May 2009 and ceased to be an independent entity.

In 2009, Deutsche Bank announced it will integrate the Dresdner Agency Security Lending business into its trust and securities services (TSS) business in global transaction banking (GTB).

Dresdner Bank attempted to get a banking operating license in Saint Petersburg, where former KGB agent Vladimir Putin was in charge of foreign economic relations. (Note: Lazar Matveev served as a senior KGB liaison officer to the Stasi in Dresden, East Germany, during 1982 to 1989, and was the boss of Vladimir Putin and his former KGB colleagues Sergey Chemezov and Nikolay Tokarev.) Dresdner Bank appointed Matthias Warnig, a former Stasi agent and Vladimir Putin's former KGB contact, (Note: Vladimir Putin, KGB, recruited Mathias Warnig, Stasi, because the Stasi had West German spies and the KGB wanted to develop its own spy network in West Germany by recruiting Stasi West German spies into the KGB.) to negotiate with Putin. The office was opened in 1991. (Note: In 1990, Banque nationale de Paris (BNP) entered into an alliance with Dresdner Bank. This alliance to enter the Eastern European markets continued until December 2000.) Warnig became chairman of the board of directors of Dresdner Bank ZAO, Dresdner Bank Russian subsidiary which was located in the massive former German embassy on St. Isaac's Square and was a joint venture with Banque nationale de Paris (BNP).

The bank has had a lucrative business relationship with Gazprom and the state oil company Rosneft. The bank advised on the forced sale of Yukos assets.

In 2017, Frankfurt prosecutors, together with federal crime police and tax officials, conducted searches of Commerzbank offices as well as the flats of three suspects in Frankfurt and nearby Hanau about a "tax evasion probe in which several current and former managers are suspected of evading 40 million euros ($47 million) in taxes via dividend stripping, also known as "cum-ex" transactions". The investigation also extends to trades in 2008 at Dresdner Bank, which was taken over by Commerzbank in 2009.

== See also ==
- Allgemeine Deutsche Credit-Anstalt
- Law for the Restoration of the Professional Civil Service
- Anti-Jewish legislation in pre-war Nazi Germany
- Jakob Goldschmidt
- List of banks in Germany
