= Dov Waxman =

American political scientist

- Born: 1974 (age 51–52)

Academic background
- Education: Oxford University; Johns Hopkins University

Academic work
- Discipline: Political science
- Sub-discipline: Israel studies
- Institutions: University of California, Los Angeles; Northeastern University; City University of New York; Bowdoin College

Dov Waxman (born 1974) is a British-American political scientist whose research and writing focuses on the Israeli–Palestinian conflict, U.S.–Israel relations, American Jewish politics, and contemporary antisemitism. He is a Professor at the University of California, Los Angeles, where he holds the Rosalinde and Arthur Gilbert Foundation Chair in Israel Studies.

== Early life and education ==
Waxman was born in London, United Kingdom, in 1974. He attended a Modern Orthodox Jewish boarding school during his secondary education. Before beginning university, he traveled extensively, including time spent in Russia shortly after the collapse of the Soviet Union, as well as in India and Israel. He also studied for a period at a yeshiva in Jerusalem.

He later attended the University of Oxford, where he studied Politics, Philosophy and Economics at Pembroke College, graduating with a BA (Honours) in 1996.

Waxman went on to complete graduate studies at the Paul H. Nitze School of Advanced International Studies at Johns Hopkins University, earning an MA in International Relations and International Economics (1998) and a PhD in International Relations with distinction (2002).

== Academic career ==
Waxman began his academic career as Assistant Professor of Government at Bowdoin College from 2002 to 2004. He then joined the City University of New York, where he served as Assistant Professor from 2004 to 2009 and later Associate Professor from 2009 to 2014 in the Department of Political Science at Baruch College and the CUNY Graduate Center.

From 2014 to 2019, he was Professor of Political Science, International Affairs, and Israel Studies at Northeastern University, where he also held the Stotsky Professorship in Jewish Historical and Cultural Studies from 2015 to 2019 and co-directed the university’s Middle East Center.

In 2020, Waxman joined the University of California, Los Angeles as the Rosalinde and Arthur Gilbert Foundation Chair in Israel Studies. Between 2020 and 2024, he was the director of the UCLA Younes and Soraya Nazarian Center for Israel Studies.

== Books ==
- The Pursuit of Peace and the Crisis of Israeli Identity: Defending/Defining the Nation, New York: Palgrave Macmillan, 2006.
- Israel’s Palestinians: The Conflict Within, (co-authored with Ilan Peleg), Cambridge University Press, 2011.
- Trouble in the Tribe: The American Jewish Conflict over Israel, Princeton University Press, 2016.
- The Israeli-Palestinian Conflict: What Everyone Needs to Know, Oxford: Oxford University Press, 2019.
