= Concealed Histories: Uncovering the Story of Nazi Looting =

Exhibition at Victoria & Albert Museum

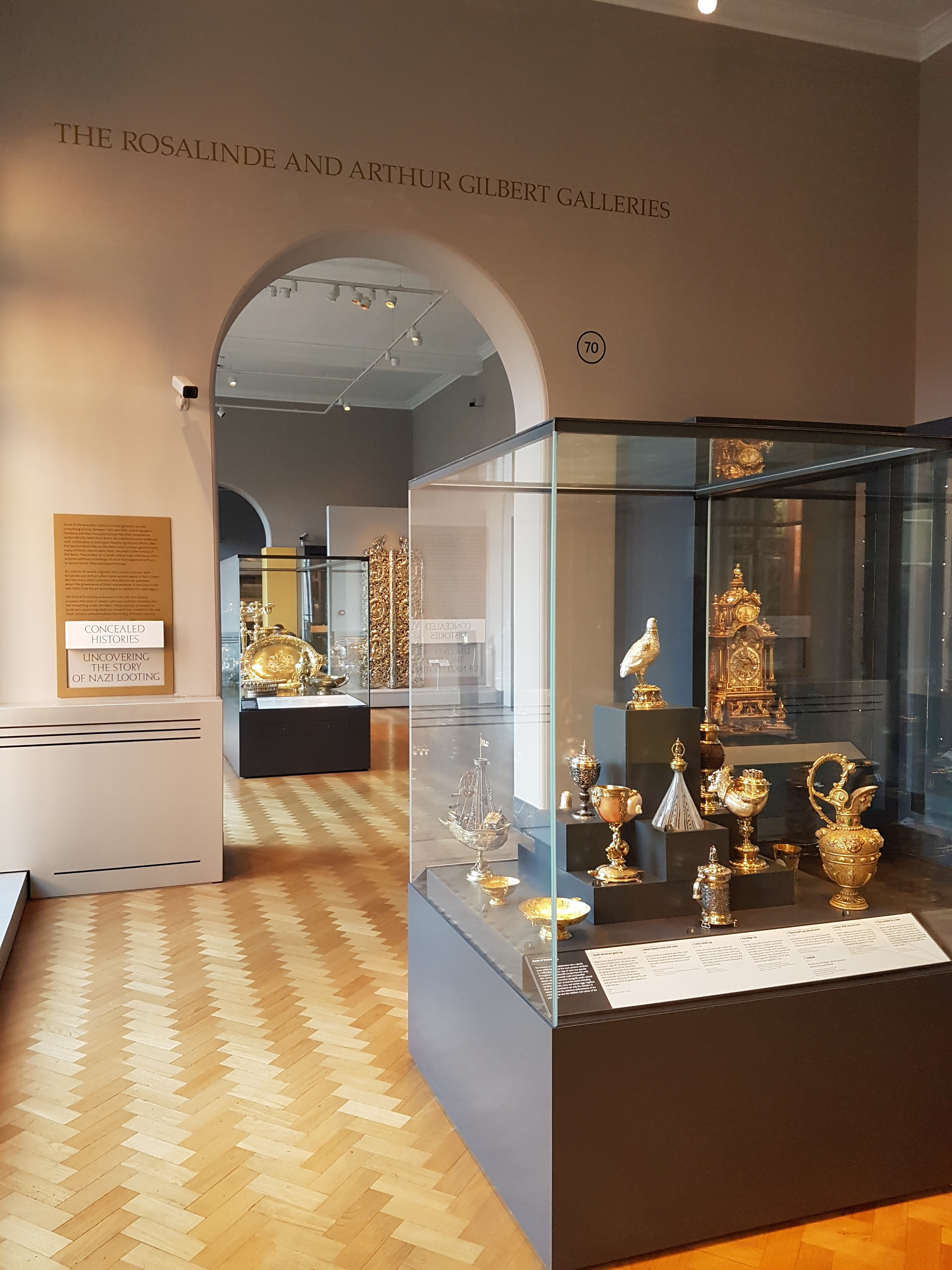
'Concealed Histories' at the Victoria & Albert Museum

Concealed Histories: Uncovering the Story of Nazi Looting was an exhibition at the Victoria & Albert Museum in London that ran from December 2019 until July 2021. It was the first Nazi-era provenance exhibition by a UK national museum.

== Background ==
In 2018, the Victoria & Albert Museum launched a research project examining the provenance of the Rosalinde and Arthur Gilbert Collection, a notable collection of works of European decorative art. The Gilbert Collection comprises 1,000 items, including gold and silver pieces, snuffboxes, portrait miniatures, pietre dure, and micro mosaics. Arthur Gilbert began collecting these items in the 1960s, many of which had significant gaps in their provenance history.

The project aimed to ascertain if Gilbert had unknowingly acquired objects confiscated or extorted by the Nazis from their victims during the period of 1933-45 and not restituted post-World War II. This research was prompted following the 1998 Washington Conference on Holocaust Era-Assets, which heightened awareness of Nazi-era provenance issues in both private and public collections.

The investigation revealed that some items in the collection had previously belonged to Jewish victims of the Nazi regime. These objects were restituted to their rightful owners before being acquired by Gilbert, who was unaware of this history. Other items were found to have belonged to Jewish collectors residing in Germany, although provenance gaps persisted despite extensive research.

These findings culminated in the exhibition 'Concealed Histories: Uncovering the Story of Nazi Looting', where the V&A sought to share the histories of these Jewish collectors with visitors. The exhibition also served as a call for further information about objects with still unclear provenance.

'Concealed Histories' was jointly curated by Alice Minter and Jacques Schuhmacher, serving as the Curator and the Provenance Curator of the Gilbert Collection respectively.

== Overview ==
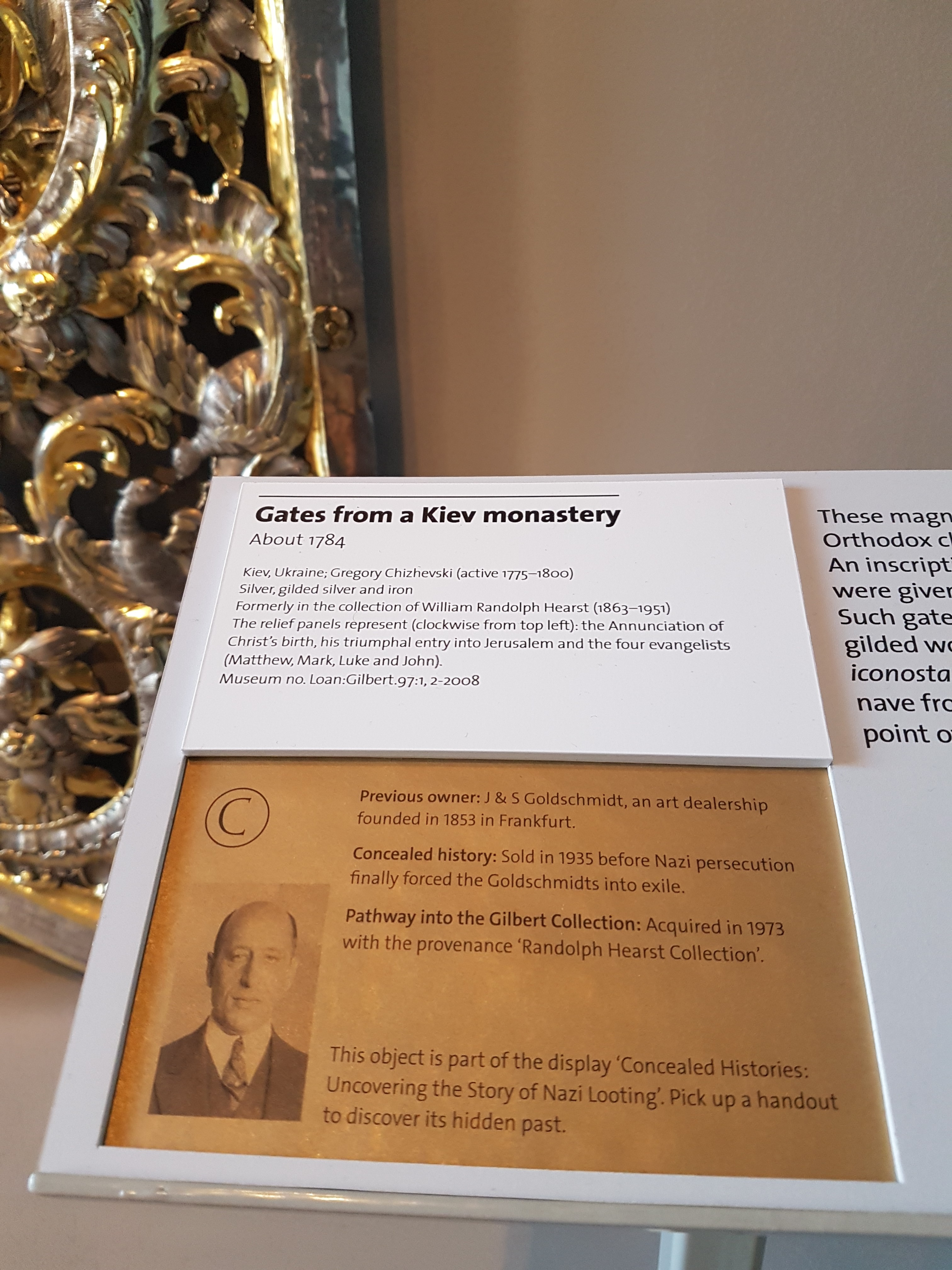
Object label in the 'Concealed Histories' exhibition

The 'Concealed Histories' exhibition highlighted eight decorative art works. The provenance of these pieces provided insights into Nazi persecution and the subsequent post-war restitution. To emphasize the broader context of their acquisition, curators integrated these items into the existing display cases in the Gilbert Galleries.

Each object was accompanied by a label featuring a photograph of the associated Jewish collector and information about its entry into the Gilbert Collection. Further information and historical context were provided through a printed leaflet available to visitors.

In addition to physical exhibits, the exhibition also featured a digital terminal. This interactive display explored the inventory of 'degenerate' art, a term used by the Nazi regime for artworks they removed from German museums beginning in 1937.

== Exhibits ==
'Concealed Histories' featured the following items from the Rosalinde and Arthur Gilbert Collection:

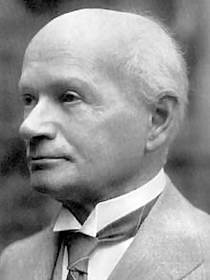
Alfred Pringsheim (1850-1941)

Stacking beaker believed to have once belonged to Alfred Pringsheim, a renowned mathematics professor with an esteemed collection of silver, gold, and ceramics. In the wave of Nazi confiscations, Pringsheim's precious metal objects were seized and transferred to the Bavarian National Museum in Munich. Allied restitution officers managed to recover Pringsheim's silver and gold collection, which was later restituted to his family.

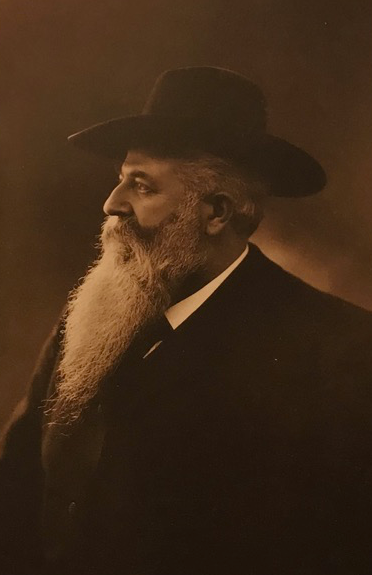
Nathan Ruben Fränkel (1848-1909

Table clock previously owned by Nathan Ruben Fränkel, a successful Jewish clockmaker from Frankfurt renowned for his encyclopaedic collection of timepieces. The history of this clock, however, is shrouded in uncertainty following Fränkel's death, with no known records of its whereabouts until it resurfaced in 1979. The absence of information during this period is particularly concerning given the severe persecution endured by Fränkel's family. Friedrich and Klara Fränkel, who managed a prosperous watch business in Frankfurt, were forced into bankruptcy by the Nazis. In a desperate bid to escape further oppression, they fled to France in 1938 where they narrowly avoided deportation, surviving the war years in hiding.

Kyiv Gates associated with J & S Goldschmidt, a Jewish art dealership known for its international reputation and high-profile clientele, which included the Russian imperial family. In 1937, during a larger campaign aimed at eliminating Jewish presence in the art trade, the Reich Culture Chamber demanded that the company's directors, Julius and Arthur Goldschmidt, dissolve their business. By this point, the brothers had already escaped Nazi Germany. Julius relocated to London, where he sold the gates in 1935 to renowned media tycoon William Randolph Hearst. Arthur, meanwhile, found refuge in France before he and his wife managed to escape to Cuba.

Portrait miniature of a gentleman in a black doublet once owned by Adolph List, whose Jewish parents had converted to Protestantism during the 19th century. List became the target of racial persecution in 1937 after an anonymous letter denounced him and his wife Clara Helene as Jewish. Subsequently, he was expelled from his own company and passed away a year later in 1938. Following Adolph's demise, Clara Helene faced scrutiny over her heritage. Despite the pressure, she was able to demonstrate that she was not of Jewish descent, thereby avoiding racial persecution by the Nazis.

Portrait miniature of a gentleman in a blue jacket from the collection of Viktor Zuckerkandl, a prominent Austrian industrialist and avid collector of 19th-century European art, who also notably supported the artist Gustav Klimt. Following Zuckerkandl's death in 1927, a portion of his collection was auctioned off in Vienna, including this miniature, which was acquired by an anonymous buyer. The rest was given to his family, including his sister Amalie. In 1941, she and her daughter Mathilde were deported to Łódź Ghetto, where they were murdered. Amalie's art collection, including paintings she had inherited from Viktor, was seized by the Gestapo.

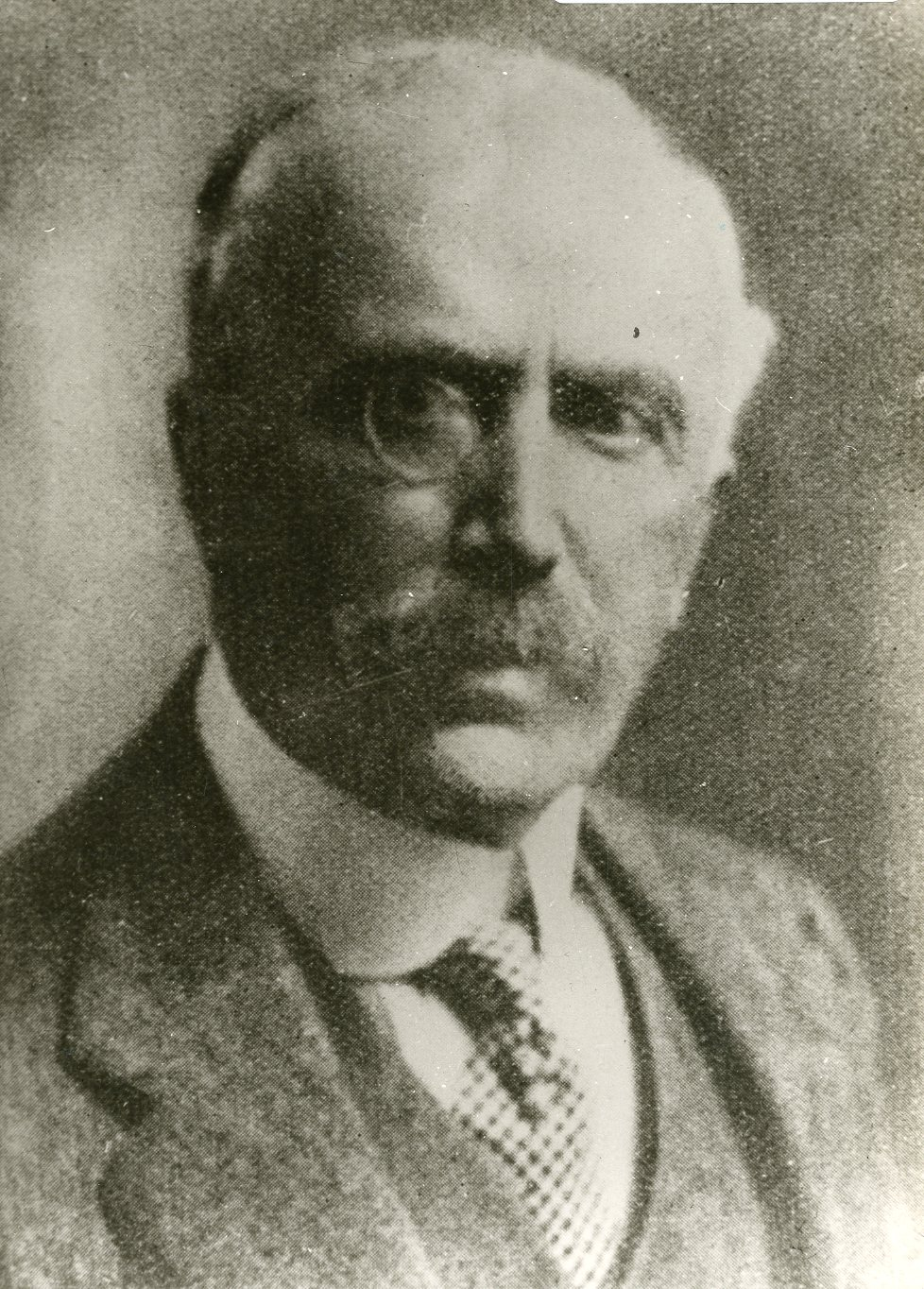
Maximilian von Goldschmidt-Rothschild (1843-1940)

Snuffbox with the monogram ‘LM’ from the collection of Maximilian von Goldschmidt-Rothschild, a successful banker who had married into the prestigious Rothschild banking dynasty, making him one of the wealthiest individuals in the German Empire. In November 1938, amid the escalating anti-Semitic violence in the city, Frankfurt's Nazi mayor forced Goldschmidt-Rothschild to sell his entire art collection to the city's museums. Following the end of World War II, Maximilian's grandson, then serving in the American military, sought the restitution of his family's collection. Archival records held by the Museum of Applied Arts and the City of Frankfurt confirm that the snuffbox was returned to the Goldschmidt-Rothschild family in 1949.

Snuffbox in the shape of a lamb from the collection of Alphonse von Rothschild, a member of the Vienna-based Rothschild dynasty. His vast familial wealth allowed him to dedicate his life to classical literature and the arts. Following the so-called ‘Anschluss’ in 1938, his art collection was confiscated, including this box, which after the war was restituted to his widow.

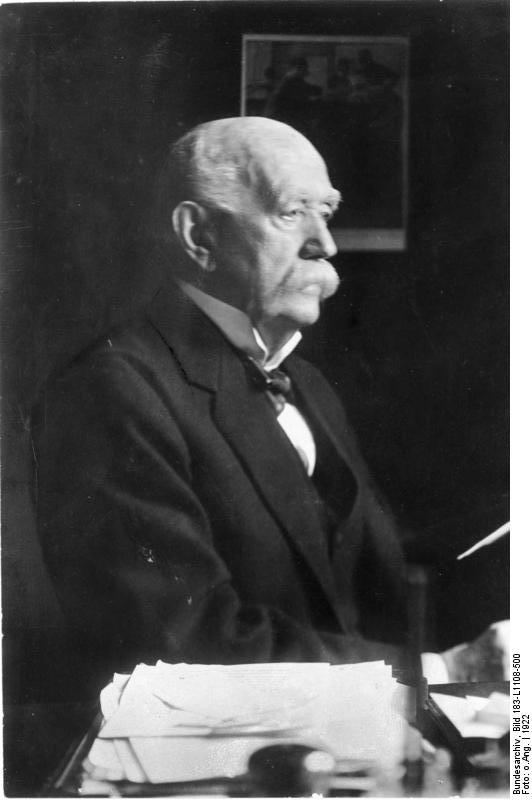
Eugen Gutmann (1840-1925)

Snuffbox with portrait of a lady formerly owned by Eugen Gutmann, a successful banker, who built a collection of gold and silver treasures, which included this box, as documented in a 1912 catalogue. Following his death, the majority of his collection passed to his son, Friedrich, who resided in the Netherlands. From 1940 onwards, Nazi art dealers repeatedly invaded the Gutmann residence, ultimately coercing Friedrich in 1942 to send his father's collection to Munich. Friedrich and his wife Louise were deported to the Theresienstadt Ghetto in 1943, where they were murdered. There are no records of this snuffbox following the 1912 catalogue until it resurfaced in the art market in 1983.

In addition to these eight items from the Rosalinde and Arthur Gilbert Collection, the exhibition also featured the Inventory of so-called ‘degenerate’ art, which is part of the National Art Library's collections. This two-volume list was compiled by the Reichsministerium für Volksaufklärung und Propaganda (Reich Ministry for Public Enlightenment and Propaganda) post-1941. The inventory represents an official record documenting the seizure of artworks that were designated as 'degenerate' by the Nazi regime. It is believed that the compilation of the inventory served as a final record after the sale and disposal of the seized art was concluded in the summer of 1941. The dual volumes of typescript provide invaluable insight regarding the provenance, confiscation and subsequent fate of each artwork. In 1997, it was donated to the Victoria & Albert Museum by the widow of Harry Fischer who in 1938 fled Vienna for London where he became a successful art dealer.

== Reception ==
The exhibition garnered considerable attention, attracting an average of 5,000 visitors per month. It received positive reviews both in the British media and from international press outlets, including iNews, The Daily Telegraph, The Art Newspaper, The National Review, Il Sole 24 Ore, Die Welt, and Jewish News.

== Bibliography ==
- Schuhmacher, Jacques (2024). Nazi-Era Provenance of Museum Collections: A research guide. London: UCL Press, pp. 71-76. ISBN 9781800086906.
