= Jacques Schuhmacher =

Provenance Researcher

Jacques Schuhmacher is a museum provenance researcher. He has been executive director of provenance research at the Art Institute of Chicago since 2024. He previously worked at the Victoria and Albert Museum (V&A). His research concerns the ownership histories of museum objects, including works affected by Nazi-era persecution and looting.

== Career ==
In 2018, Schuhmacher joined the V&A as provenance curator for the Rosalinde and Arthur Gilbert Collection. His task was to research gaps in the ownership histories of the objects and to establish whether any had belonged to Jewish collectors who had been dispossessed during the Nazi period. According to The Sunday Telegraph, he was the first museum curator in the UK dedicated specifically to provenance research.

He co-curated Concealed Histories: Uncovering the Story of Nazi Looting, which opened in 2019. The exhibition examined the histories of objects that had belonged to Jewish collectors persecuted under the Nazi regime.

Schuhmacher also investigated the provenance of an Anatolian gold ewer dating from the third millennium BCE. His research linked the object's ownership history to dealers associated with the illicit antiquities trade. The Gilbert Trust for the Arts returned the ewer to Turkey in 2021.

In 2024, he joined the Art Institute of Chicago as executive director of provenance research. He leads the museum's provenance research across the entire collection. In 2025, he was involved in the return to Nepal of a 12th-century sculpture depicting the Buddha sheltered by the serpent king Muchalinda, after provenance research found that it had been stolen from the Kathmandu Valley.

== Publications ==
With Jonathan Waterlow, Schuhmacher co-edited War Crimes Trials and Investigations: A Multi-Disciplinary Introduction (Palgrave Macmillan, 2018), which examines how different disciplines approach the study of war crimes prosecutions, including forensic anthropology, law, international relations and moral philosophy.

Schuhmacher's Nazi-Era Provenance of Museum Collections: A Research Guide (UCL Press, 2024) examines the history of Nazi persecution and dispossession, and the methods and resources used to investigate the ownership histories of objects in museum collections.
