= Nikolay Tokarev =

Russian businessman and oligarch (born 1950)

- Николай Токарев
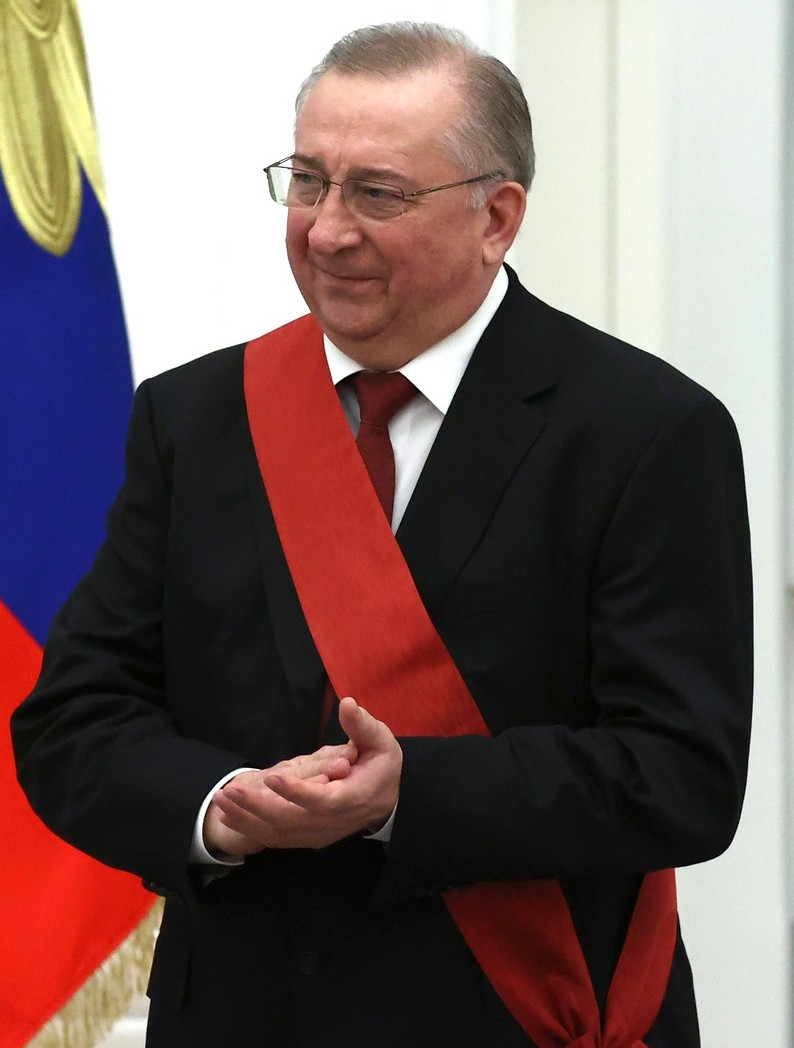
- Tokarev in 2022

President of Transneft
- Incumbent
- Assumed office 2007

Personal details
- Born: 20 December 1950 (age 75) Karaganda, Kazakh SSR, Soviet Union
- Party: United Russia

Nikolay Petrovich Tokarev (Russian: Николай Петрович Токарев; born 20 December 1950) is a Russian businessman and oligarch. He is the president of the Russian pipeline company Transneft.

== Early life and KGB ==
In 1973, Tokarev graduated from Karaganda Polytechnic Institute (KarPI) (Russian: Карагандинский политехнический институт (КарПИ)) with a degree in Electrification and Automation of Mining Works.

From 1978, Tokarev studied at the Moscow Higher School of the KGB (Russian: Высшая школа КГБ) for two years while Sergei Naryshkin also studied in the French section at the Higher School of the KGB at the same time and Vladimir Putin, who was also at the Higher School of the KGB, lived across the corridor from Naryshkin at the same time.

With a phone number as Major Tokarew in the Stasi phone book listed as the same number as Hptm. Tschemesow, he was a KGB officer in Dresden, East Germany, where he met and allied with KGB officers Vladimir Putin and Sergey Chemezov who were living in Dresden under their KGB boss Lazar Matveev. After Putin arrived at Dresden in 1985, Tokarev, who arrived at Dresden in 1983 two years before Putin, was a senior comrade to Putin and took him in under his wing. They became close friends.

Between 1996 and 1999, Tokarev worked for the state Presidential Property Management Department where Putin's title was deputy chief in 1996 and 1997.

== Oil businessman ==
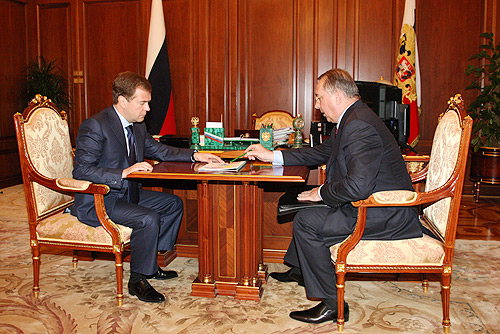
Meeting with then Russian President Dmitry Medvedev concerning the Eastern Siberia–Pacific Ocean oil pipeline on 16 June 2008

From 1999 to 2000, before heading Zarubezhneft, he worked at Transneft in the department of the foreign economic block and foreign projects.

Tokarev has been president of Transneft since October 2007 and a member of the company's board of directors since June 2009. From 2000 to 2007, he was president of the Russian oil company Zarubezhneft.

Tokarev has been board of directors of Rosneft since October 2009.

Under an agreement dated 26 May 2015, Tokarev through his TNT (Russian: АО «ТНТ») and Transneft-SERVIS (Russian: ООО «ТРАНСНЕФТЬ - СЕРВИС») pays more than a 100 million rubles a month "for rent of premises of non-residential objects" (Russian: ЗА АРЕНДУ ПОМЕЩЕНИЙ ОБЪЕКТОВ НЕЖИЛОГО) at Putin's palace at Gelendzhik.

== Sanctions ==
On 28 February 2022, in relation to the 2022 Russian invasion of Ukraine, the European Union blacklisted Tokarev and had all his assets frozen. On 3 March, the United States imposed similar sanctions on Tokarev, his wife and daughter. On 10 March, the British government imposed sanctions which involved freezing Nikolay's assets and a travel ban.

He was sanctioned by New Zealand in relation to the 2022 Russian invasion of Ukraine.

== Personal ==
In 2002, the company Stroyvip, which has the same address as Promsvyazbank, became a shareholder of the former Pravda (Russian: «Правда») now known as the largest publishing and printing complex "Press-1" (Russian: «Пресса-1»).

In 2004, his daughter Maya Bolotova (Russian: Майя Болотова), was associated with Promsvyazbank (Russian: Промсвязьбанк) firms Promsvyazavto (Russian: «Промсвязьавто»), Stroyvip (Russian: «Стройвип»), and Industry Import (Russian: «Индустрия импорт») and are controlled by brothers Alexey Ananiev (Russian: Алексей Ананьев) and Dmitry Ananiev (Russian: Дмитрий Ананьев). During her time with Promsvyazbank, the bank significantly increased its assets by sixfold between 2004 and 2007 and became one of the three systematically important banks in Russia.

In 2007, Tokarev's son in law Andrey Bolotov (Russian: Андрей Болотов; born 1973 or 1974) was closely associated with ITERA from 2001 to 2004 and since 2005 has headed the large clients' accounts at Vneshtorgbank (VTB). His sister Olga (Russian: Ольга) was closely associated with LUKOIL (Russian: ЛУКОЙЛ).

As of January 2017, Bolotova was a former owner of PharmEco (Russian: «ФармЭко») and is a partner at Gelendzhik with Sergey Chemezov's son Stanislav Chemezov (Russian: Станислав Чемезов) who owns a 25% stake, Vladimir Chernyshev (Russian: Владимир Чернышев) who was an advisor to Vladimir Yakunin, and Vladimir Maishev (Russian: Владимир Майшев) who is a co-owner of the Independent Insurance Group (Russian: «Независимой страховой группы») in the LLC Gelendzhik Resort Complex - Meridian (Russian: ООО «Геленджикский курортный комплекс – Меридиан»). Previously, Bolotova had owned MIK Rusinvest LLC (Russian: ООО «МИК «Русинвест»), which is a company that was owned by the family of Vladimir Artyakov, who is the first deputy of the Sergey Chemezov led Rostec, and Stanislav Chemezov who formerly held a 48.5% stake. Bolotova and her husband are citizens of Cyprus.
