= Deutsche Orientbank =

Former German bank active in the Near East

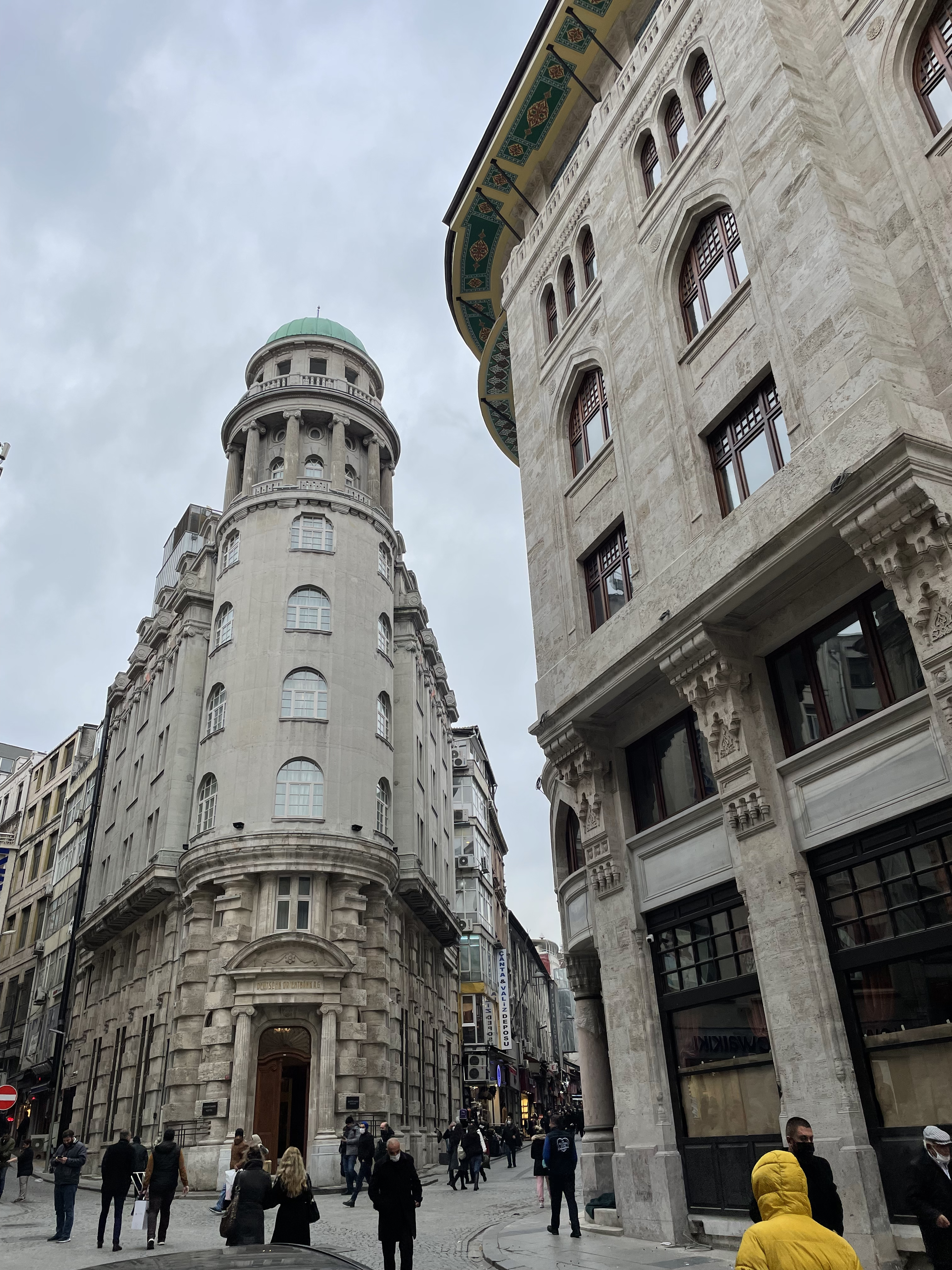
Former head office in Sirkeci, Istanbul (left), later Orientbank Hotel

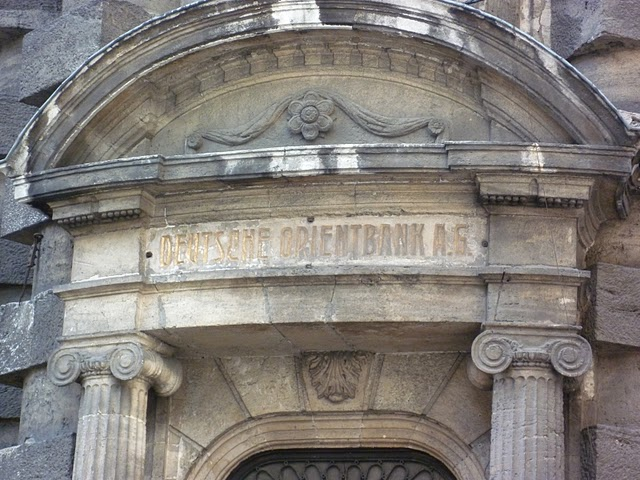
The Orientbank's name on its former branch building in Sirkeci

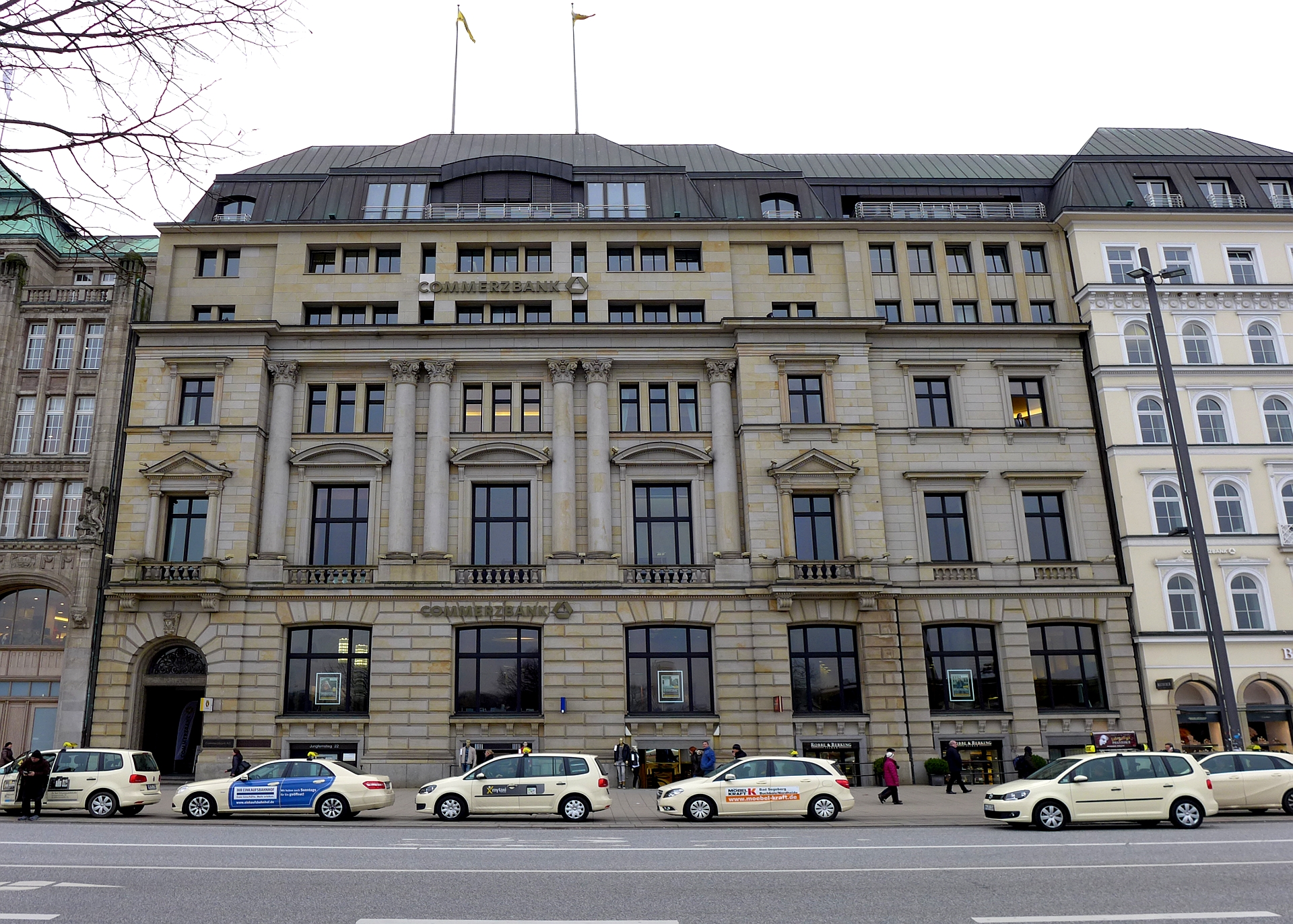
Former branch in Hamburg, Jungfernstieg 22

The Deutsche Orientbank (DOB, lit. 'German Bank of the Orient') was a German bank, founded in 1905-1906 in Berlin and merged into Dresdner Bank in 1931-1932. It was originally intended for financing ventures in the Ottoman Empire and the Khedivate of Egypt.

In mid-1914 the Orientbank absorbed the Levantine network of Deutsche Palästina-Bank, established in the late 19th century as an earlier endeavor to develop German economic influence in the Ottoman Empire.

== History ==
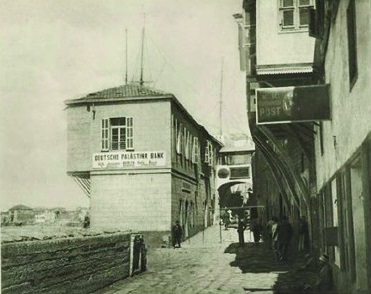
Deutsche Palästina-Bank branch in Jaffa, 1914

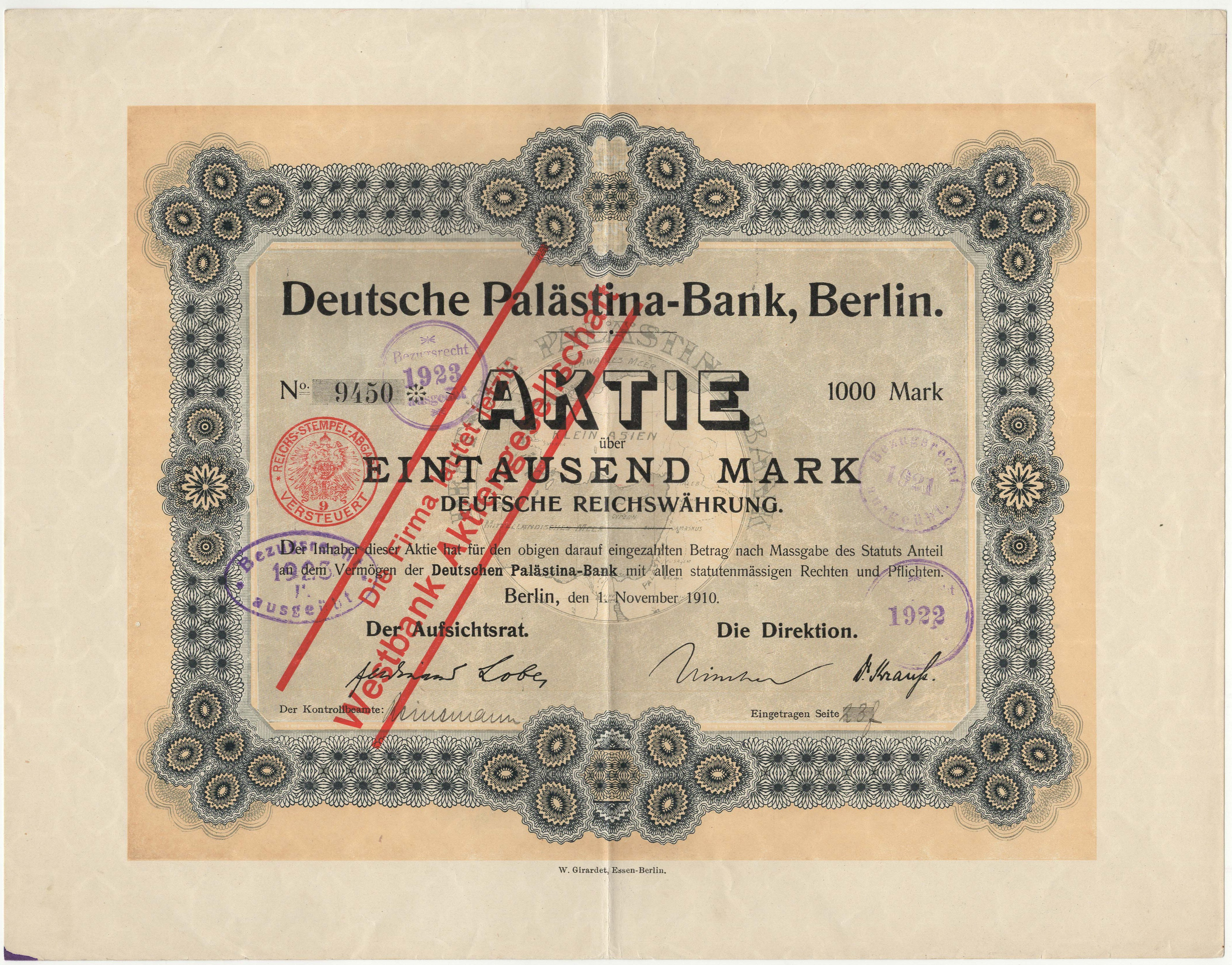
Share of the Deutschen Palästina-Bank, issued 1 November 1910

At its founding in 1905-1906, driven by banker Eugen Gutmann and his son Herbert M. Gutmann, the new venture was sponsored by Dresdner Bank, Nationalbank für Deutschland, and A. Schaaffhausen'scher Bank Association, with respective shares of 37.5 percent for Dresdner and 31.25 percent for each of the other two. It was part of a broader German push to gain influence in the Ottoman Empire, also involving Deutsche Bank and the financing of the Berlin–Baghdad railway. The newly established Orientbank soon took over the branches in Hamburg and Constantinople of Banque d'Orient, initially a joint venture of National Bank of Greece and Nationalbank für Deutschland but with the latter soon replaced by France's Comptoir national d'escompte de Paris.

Initially the Orientbank was kept out of major deals by the dominant alliance of Deutsche Bank and the Imperial Ottoman Bank, but gained influence following the Young Turk Revolution in 1908. In addition to the Berlin head office and the branches in Constantinople and Hamburg, by 1913 it had opened in Adana, Bursa, Dedeağaç, and Mersin. It also opened six branches in Egypt; in Tangier and Casablanca at the request of the German government; and briefly in the Balkans. Following the establishment of the French protectorate in Morocco in 1912, the Orientbank sold the two branches there in 1913 to Société Générale. In mid-1914, Orientbank took over the branch network of Deutsche Palästina-Bank (DPB), which had been established in Berlin in 1896-1899 with branches and offices in Jaffa, Jerusalem, Gaza and later in Beirut (1907), Damascus and Tripoli (1910), and Alexandretta (1913). The German business of DPB was separately restructured by the Nationalbank für Deutschland.

During World War I, the activity of the Orientbank's in Egypt was suspended by the British authorities. In 1916, the Schaaffhausen'scher Bankverein withdrew from the Orientbank, selling its shares to a consortium of German and Austrian-Hungarian banks. After the war, the bank's Levantine network was liquidated by the Public Custodian of Enemy Property under British rule.

By 1919-1920, it had branches in Constantinople (main branch in Sirkeci and branch offices in Galata, Pera, and Kadıköy); in Adana, Bursa, Edirne, and Mersin; in Aleppo in Syria; and in Egypt in Alexandria, Beni Suef, Cairo, Damanhur, Mansoura, Minya, and Tanta.

The European banking crisis of 1931 led to the collapse of the Orientbank's two main shareholders, namely Dresdner and Danatbank (as Nationalbank für Deutschland had merged with Darmstädter Bank in 1922), and to an incipient subsequent bank run on the Orientbank itself. Following the two German banks' merger and rescue, the newly strengthened Dresdner Bank took over the Orientbank's Egyptian branch network. Dresdner also became sole owner of Orientbank in Turkey, but kept operating it under the Orientbank brand name. The Orientbank was involved in Nazi transactions in stolen gold, for which Istanbul was a hub, and was eventually liquidated in 1946.

== Buildings ==
The head office in Berlin was successively at Markgrafenstrasse 56, then Französische Strasse 29. The main branch in Constantinople, in the Sirkeci neighborhood of Eminönü, designed by Prussian architect August Jasmund and completed in 1912, was known as Germanya Han (lit. 'Germany's commercial building'). Following a major renovation in 2021, it has become the Orientbank Hotel Istanbul. In Hamburg, the Orientbank's branch was established in a prominent building on the Jungfernstieg quayside, designed by Martin Haller and Hermann Geissler and completed in 1899; it later became offices for Dresdner Bank, then Commerzbank.

== See also ==
- Banque de Salonique
- National Bank of Turkey
- List of banks in Germany
