= Yevgeny Murov =

Russian military personnel (born 1945)

- Евгений Муров
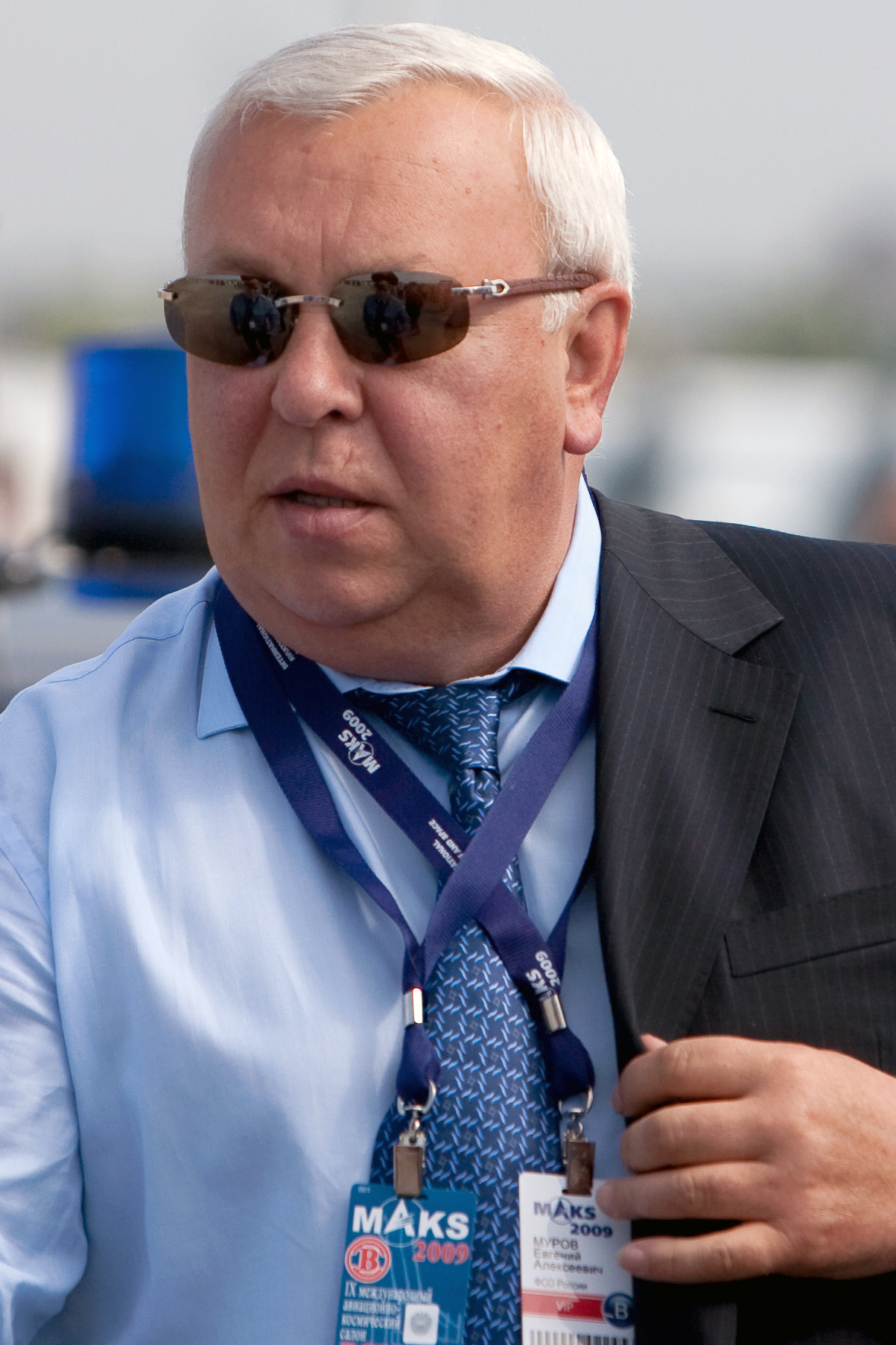
- Murov in 2009

2nd Director of the Federal Protective Service
- In office 18 May 2000 – 26 May 2016
- Preceded by: Yuri Krapivin
- Succeeded by: Dmitry Kochnev

Personal details
- Born: Yevgeny Alekseyevich Murov; 18 November 1945 (age 80) Zvenigorod, Moscow Oblast, Soviet Union

Yevgeny Alekseyevich Murov (Russian: Евгений Алексеевич Муров; born 18 November 1945) is a Russian politician and government agent who had served as the leader of the Russian special services, and director of the Federal Protective Service of Russia from 2000 to 2016. He is a General of the Army as of 12 June 2004.

== Biography ==
Yevgeny Murov was born in the city of Zvenigorod, Moscow Oblast on 18 November 1945.

He graduated from the Leningrad Technological Institute of the Pulp and Paper Industry and the Red Banner Institute of the KGB of the Soviet Union. He joined the State Security Committee (KGB) of the Soviet Union in 1971. In 1974, he was transferred to the First Chief Directorate of the KGB for foreign intelligence. For three and a half years he was on a business trip in one of the countries of Southeast Asia.

From 1992 to 1997, he served as the head of a number of regional divisions of the Ministry of Security - the Federal Counterintelligence Service - the Federal Security Service of Russia in Saint Petersburg, and in particular, he headed the Admiralty regional department of the FSB of Russia. Since 1997, he had been the Deputy Head of the Directorate of the FSB of Russia in Saint Petersburg and the Leningrad Oblast. In 1998, he was transferred to the central office of the FSB of Russia, appointed first deputy head of the Department of Economic Security of the FSB of Russia.

On 18 May 2000, Murov became the Head of the Federal Protective Service of the Russia (FSO of Russia). By the decree of the President of Russia, in 2004, Murov was awarded the military rank of General of the Army. This was the first time in the history of Soviet and post-Soviet special services, that the head of the security service had held a high rank. Murov's promotion in military ranks had been rapid, since he held the rank of major general at the time of his appointment as director of the FSO of Russia in 2000.

There is practically no information about the details of the biography of Murov. It is known that in his youth he was engaged in boxing, has sporting achievements and categories. For several years Murov was the head of the Board of Trustees of the Boxing Federation of Russia. On 27 June 2007, he was elected President of the Boxing Federation of Russia. In November–December 2009, he resigned from the post of President of the Russian Boxing Federation and headed the Supreme Supervisory Board of the association. He was also a member of the Board of Trustees of the All-Russian Physical Culture and Sports Society "Dynamo".

On 1 November 2010, he was dismissed from military service by decree of the President of the Russia, while retaining the post of director of the FSO of Russia. On 26 May 2016, Russian President Vladimir Putin signed a decree on the release of Murov from the post of director of the Federal Protection Service at Murov's own request. On the same day, he was appointed chairman of the Board of Directors of the Russian state oil company Zarubezhneft.

== Criticism and reviews ==
The media called Murov's main features phenomenal memory and extreme rigidity.

== Family ==
He is married, and has a son, Andrey, who is the chairman of the Board of FGC UES PJSC.
