= Assembly of Greeks =

- General Secretary: Artemis Sorras
- Founder: Artemis Sorras
- Founded: 2015
- Ideology: Populism; Cult of the leader Grassroots system Racism; Antisemitism
- Political position: Far-right
- Religion: Ancient Greek religion
- Colours: Light blue
- Hellenic Parliament: 0 / 300
- European Parliament: 0 / 21

Website
- e-sy.gr

Assembly of Greeks (Greek: Ελλήνων Συνέλευσις) is a far-right, ultranationalist Greek political party. It was founded by Artemis Sorras.

Since its foundation, it remains attached to the Ancient Greek religion, which is considered as a "pure Greek" religion from the party. Every member of the party is obliged to adopt the religion with the "oath of the fighter". It also organises rituals in Ancient Olympia. Its rhetoric has been considered as conspiracist, racist, antisemitic, and homophobic.

It was accused for being a criminal organisation and it has been tried for serious crimes. On 6 December 2019, Sorras was sentenced to six years in prison for an attempted fraud against the state.

== History ==
It was founded by Artemis Sorras in 2015. It promised to write off debts immediately and to make large payments to every Greek tax registry number, in case it forms a government. The membership of the organisation increased, reaching more than 12,000 members. To complete their registration the members had to take an oath to the ancient Greek religion, while it organised rituals in ancient Olympia. In various events across Greece, it suggested citizens to deny Greece's debts and become members of the organisation, with the target of the country's rescue.

In a few years, the organisation established offices in various Greek cities. Attacks against its offices have been repeatedly reported.

The party participated in the 2019 European Parliament election with 42 candidates, including Sorras. Despite the fact that Sorras was detained, the Supreme Civil and Criminal Court of Greece accepted his request to participate in the election. Just a few weeks later, Sorras was candidate for the 2019 Greek legislative election.

== Legal disputes ==
The Greek Assembly has been accused for conducting a fraud against the state. According to the memorandum of an attorney: It acted as a criminal organisation, convincing citizens not to pay their insurance levies and taxes to the state, banks and severance funds, resulting in an uncountable damage for them. Certainly, the defendants of the organisation were ten. They were accused for various crimes, including the direction and affiliation in a criminal organisation, fraud against the state, banks and severance funds, money laundering etc.

=== Murder of Thomi Koumpoura ===
On 28 December 2016, the pediatric psychiatrist Thomi Koumpoura was found dead after she was stabbed more than 15 times by a member of the organisation. Sorras was involved with a post on Facebook about the perpetrator Christos Balantinas, aged 40, while the police was still trying to detect him. Balantinas was later arrested and sentenced to life imprisonment.

== Election results ==
=== Hellenic Parliament ===
| Election | Hellenic Parliament | | | | | Rank | Government | Leader |
| Election | Votes | % | ±pp | Seats won | +/− | Rank | Government | Leader |
|---|---|---|---|---|---|---|---|---|
| 2019 | 14,079 | 0.25% | New | 0 / 300 | New | 14th | Extra-parliamentary | Artemis Sorras |
| May 2023 | 12,749 | 0.22% | –0.03 | 0 / 300 | 0 | 23rd | Extra-parliamentary | Artemis Sorras |
| Jun 2023 | 8,820 | 0.17% | –0.05 | 0 / 300 | 0 | 20th | Extra-parliamentary | Artemis Sorras |

=== European Parliament ===
European Parliament
| Election | Votes | % | ±pp | Seats won | +/− | Rank | Leader | EP Group |
|---|---|---|---|---|---|---|---|---|
| 2019 | 29,509 | 0.52% | New | 0 / 21 | New | 22nd | Artemis Sorras | − |
| 2024 | 6,980 | 0.18% | −0.34 | 0 / 21 | 0 | 26th | Artemis Sorras | − |

== See also ==
- Banque d'Orient
