= Banque d'Orient =

Former Greek bank

- Former head office of the Banque d'Orient on Sofokleous Street, Athens
- Type: Private company
- Industry: Financial services
- Founded: 1904
- Founders: National Bank of Greece and Nationalbank für Deutschland
- Defunct: 1932
- Fate: Absorbed
- Successor: National Bank of Greece
- Headquarters: Athens, Greece
- Area served: Eastern Mediterranean
- Products: Banking services

The Banque d'Orient (Greek: Τράπεζα της Ανατολής, lit. 'Bank of the East') was a bank active in the Eastern Mediterranean headquartered in Athens, Greece. It was founded in 1904 with sponsorship by the National Bank of Greece (NBG), and eventually absorbed by NBG in 1932.

== History ==
The Banque d'Orient is commonly referred to under its French name, because French was the vehicular language of the financial and business community in early-20th-century Greece and the Ottoman Empire.

It was originally founded as a joint venture between NBG and the Berlin-based Nationalbank für Deutschland. The latter, however, sold its shares after one year to France's Comptoir National d'Escompte de Paris, and the Banque d'Orient sold its branches in Constantinople and Hamburg to the newly established Deutsche Orientbank.

By 1915, the Banque d'Orient had operations in Alexandria in Egypt, Salonica in Northern Greece, and Smyrna in the Ottoman Empire. It had to close its Smyrna branch in 1923 as a consequence of the Treaty of Lausanne.

In 1932, in the wake of the European banking crisis of 1931, the NBG took full control of the Banque d'Orient and integrated it into its operations.

In the 2010s, activist Artemis Sorras, leader of the ultra-nationalist Assembly of Greeks, claimed ownership of assets from the Banque d'Orient in a publicity stunt that was quickly dismissed by the Greek authorities.

== See also ==
- Bank of Athens
- List of banks in Greece
