= Nationalbank für Deutschland =

Former German bank

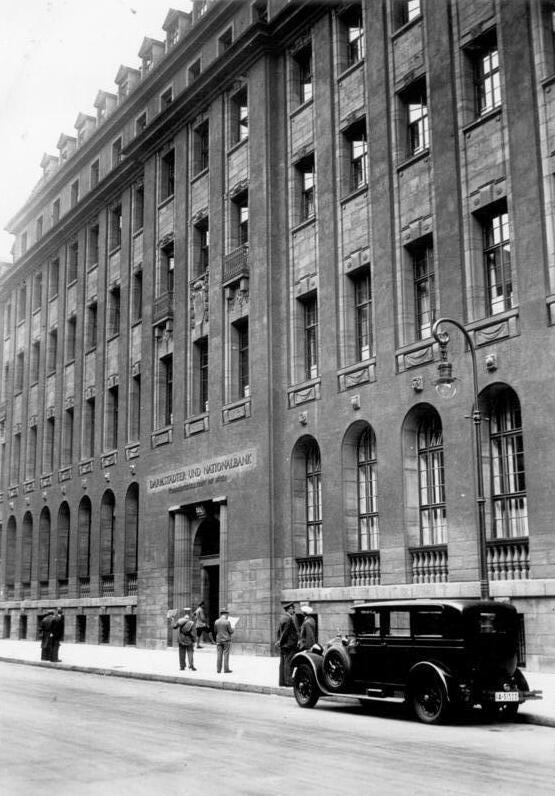
- Former head office of Nationalbank für Deutschland on Berlin's Behrensstrasse
- Company type: Joint-stock company
- Industry: Financial services
- Founded: 1881
- Defunct: 1922
- Fate: Merged
- Successor: Danat-Bank
- Headquarters: Berlin, Germany
- Products: Banking services

The Nationalbank für Deutschland (lit. 'National Bank for Germany') was a significant joint-stock bank in Germany, founded in 1881 and merged in 1922 with Darmstädter Bank to form Darmstädter und Nationalbank, in shorthand Danat-Bank.

== History ==
The Nationalbank für Deutschland was founded in 1881 in Berlin, with sponsors including the Commerz- und Disconto-Bank, Anglo-Austrian Bank, Vienna's newly established Länderbank, the latter's affiliate Ungarische Landesbank, and Breslauer Disconto-Bank Friedenthal & Co. It was initially headquartered at Unter den Linden 2, then moved in 1884 to Voßstrasse 34, and in 1907 to Behrensstrasse 68-69 where it would remain until the 1922 merger. It developed a network of branches in Berlin and its region, reaching 29 locations by 1922.

The Nationalbank was involved, together with other German banks, in the creation of foreign-oriented ventures such as the Deutsch-Asiatische Bank in Shanghai (1889), and also participated in the restructuring of the former Banca di Genova as Credito Italiano in Rome (1895).

In the early 20th century, the Nationalbank für Deutschland attempted to expand into the Ottoman Empire which was increasingly under German influence. In 1904, together with the National Bank of Greece, it established the Banque d'Orient in Athens, but sold its shares the next year to France's Comptoir national d'escompte de Paris. In 1905–1906, it participated in the establishment of Berlin-based Deutsche Orientbank (together with Dresdner Bank and A. Schaaffhausen'scher Bankverein), in which it took a 31.25 percent share; the Orientbank in turn took over the branches of the Banque d'Orient in Hamburg and Constantinople.

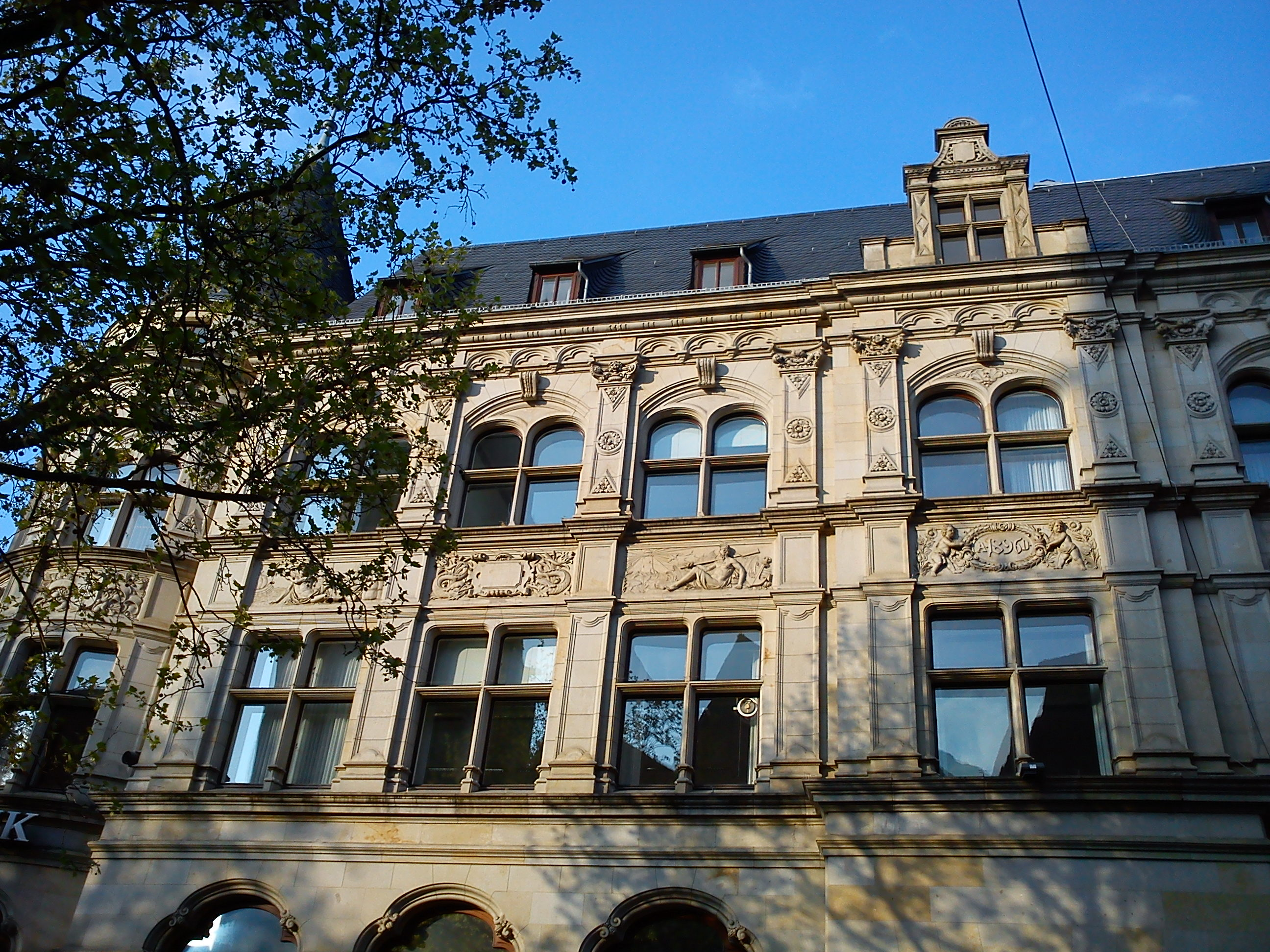
Former head office of Deutsche Nationalbank in Bremen

In 1920, Nationalbank für Deutschland merged with the near-synonymous Deutsche Nationalbank, which had been founded in Bremen in 1871 and in 1906 had taken over the Nordwestdeutsche Bank AG.

In 1920/1921, the Darmstädter Bank für Handel und Industrie and the Nationalbank für Deutschland formed the bank union Darmstädter-Nationalbank Berlin, with the merger completed in 1922.

Its board members included Hjalmar Schacht from 1917 on, and Jakob Goldschmidt from 1918, both of which were also among the bank's influential shareholders.

== See also ==
- Dresdner Bank
- List of banks in Germany
