= Lazar Matveev =

Soviet KGB officer (1927–2021)

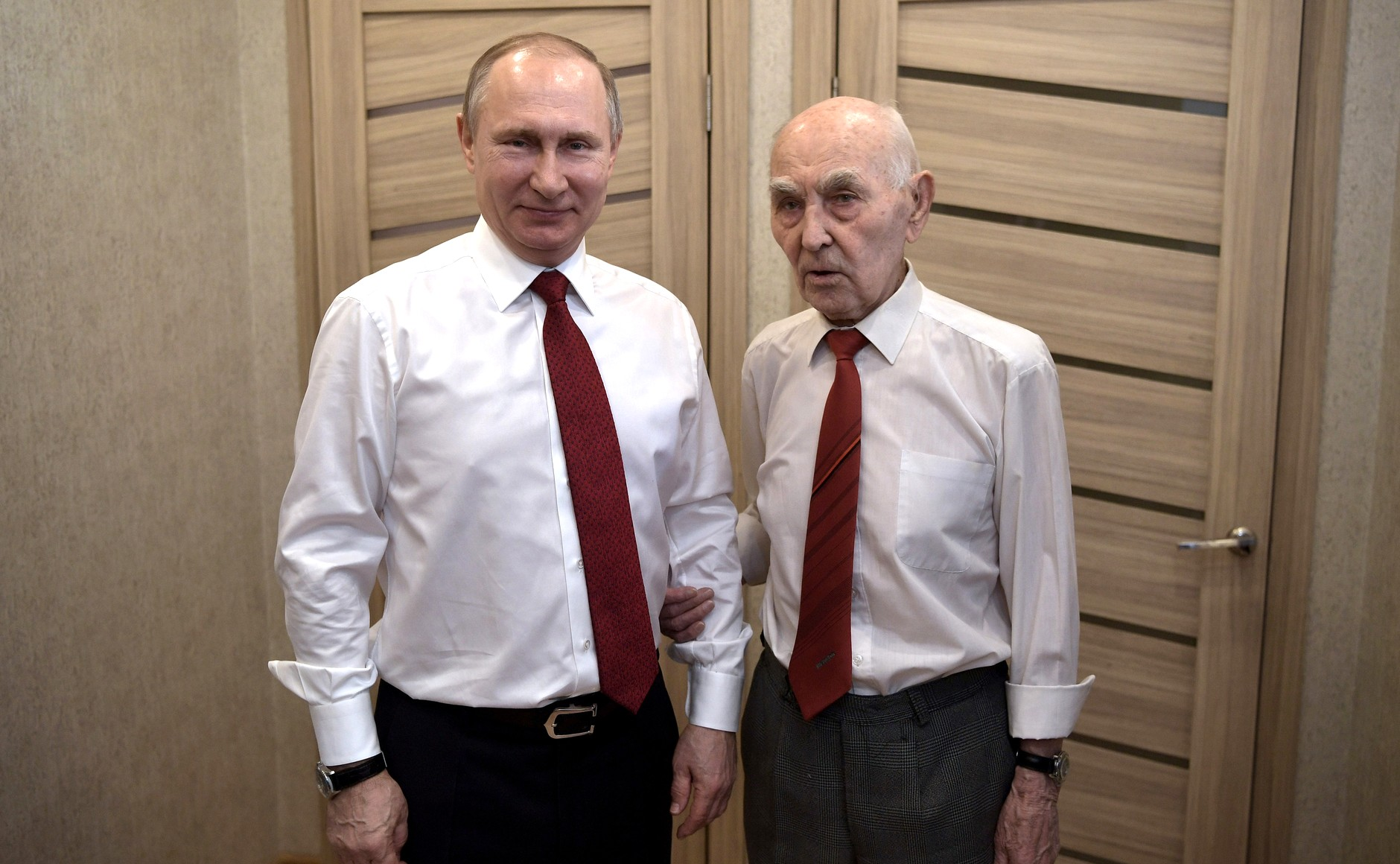
- Matveev (right) standing next to Vladimir Putin in 2017
- Born: Lazar Lazarevich Matveev; 17 April 1927; Krasnoyarsk Krai, RSFSR, Soviet Union (Now Russia)
- Died: 16 May 2021 (aged 94)
- Spouse: Evgenia Pavina
- Military career
- Allegiance: Soviet Union
- Branch: KGB

Lazar Lazarevich Matveev (Russian: Ла́зарь Лазаре́вич Матве́ев; 17 April 1927 – 16 May 2021) was a Soviet intelligence leader. He served as a senior KGB liaison officer to the Stasi in Dresden, East Germany, during 1982 to 1989, where Vladimir Putin, the current President of Russia, worked for him. On Matveev's 90th birthday, Russian President Vladimir Putin and his former KGB colleagues Sergey Chemezov and Nikolay Tokarev who also worked for Matveev, visited him in his home in Zhulebino, Moscow to celebrate his birthday. Putin brought him a wrist watch with the presidential coat of arms and a rare copy of the Pravda newspaper that was published on 17 April 1927 – the day Matveev was born.

Matveev died on 16 May 2021, at the age of 94.
