= Eugen Gutmann =

German banker, philanthropist, and art collector

Eugen Gutmann Kommerzienrat a.d.
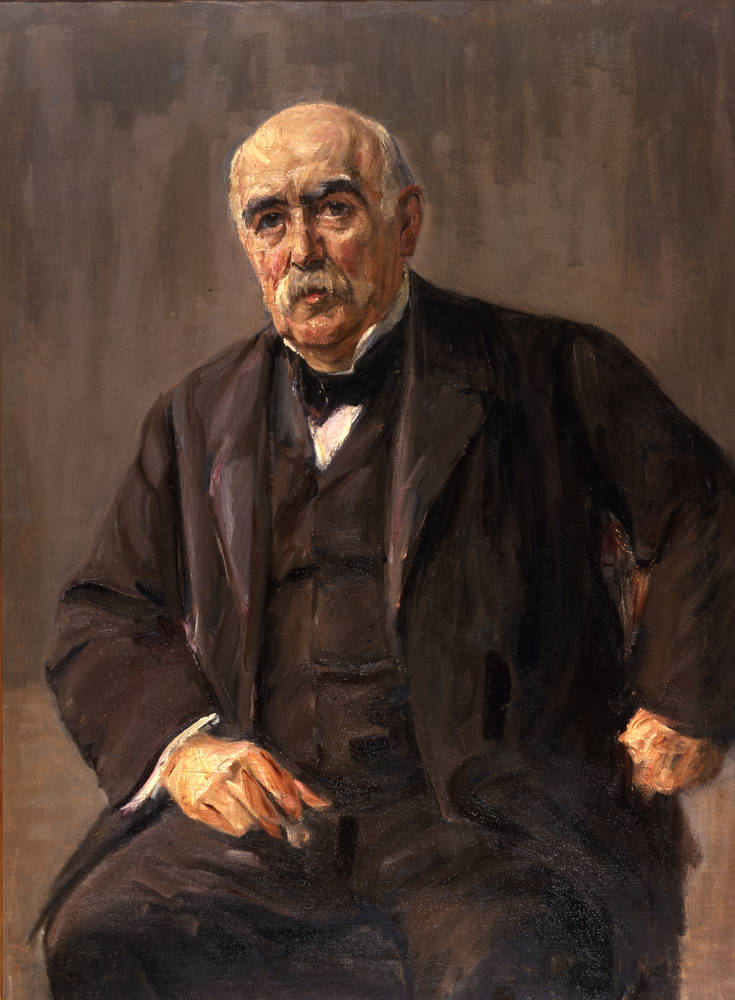
- Gutmann portrayed by Max Liebermann, 1907
- Born: Eugen Gutmann; 24 June 1840; Dresden, Saxony, Kingdom of Prussia (now Germany)
- Died: August 21, 1925 (aged 85); Munich, Bavaria, Weimar Republic
- Resting place: Berlin-Wedding
- Occupations: Banker; philanthropist; art collector
- Known for: Founding and leading the Dresdner Bank; Co-founding the Deutsche Orientbank, German-South American merchant bank
- Children: 7, including Friedrich

Eugen Gutmann (24 June 1840 - 21 August 1925) was a German banker, philanthropist and art collector who is primarily known for founding Dresdner Bank and co-founder of Deutsche Orientbank and the German-South American merchant bank.

He primarily collected silverware which was partially sold to J. P. Morgan and today is exhibited at the Metropolitan Museum of Art. Gutmann is also the namesake of the Eugen-Gutmann-Society (Eugen-Gutmann-Gesellschaft) which is the historical association preserving the history of Commerzbank.

== Early life and education ==
Gutmann was born 24 June 1840 in Dresden, Saxony, the third of twelve children, to Bernhard Gutmann (né Baruch Gutmann), a private banker, and Maria (née Lederer), who was originally from Bohemia. He was raised in a wealthy Jewish family.

== Career ==
In 1872, Gutmann advised the v. Kaskel family, to form a stock corporation and turn their family bank into Dresdner Bank. Between 1872 and 1920, Gutmann served as chairman of the supervisory board and is referred to as the founder of the banking institute. In 1905, he was the co-founder of Deutsche Orientbank and the German-South American merchant bank. He was also notable for being the financier and board member of several companies in the German heavy industry.

== Personal life ==
In 1873, Gutmann married Sophie Magnus-Gerson, of Leipzig. They had seven children;

- Lili Eugenie Anna Gutmann (1874–1967), who married twice to Luca Orsini Baroni, an Italian politician and diplomat and then to Adolf Freiherr von Holzing-Berstett, a nobleman.
- Toinon Rosalie Henriette 'Antonie' Gutmann (1876–1964) married Hans Henric von Essen of Stockholm.
- Waulther Gutmann (1877–1917)
- Herbert Maximilian Magnus Gutmann (1879–1942)
- Kurt Gutmann (1883–1957)
- Max Ludwig Gutmann (1884–1948)
- Friedrich Bernhard Eugen Gutmann (1886–1944), married to Erika Luise Freiin von Landau (1892–1944); both murdered during The Holocaust; two children who later used the surname Goodman.

Gutmann died aged 85 on 21 August 1925 in Munich. Gutmann and his family converted from Judaism to Christianity in 1889.
