= Sergey Chemezov =

Russian oligarch and politician (born 1952)

- Сергей Чемезов
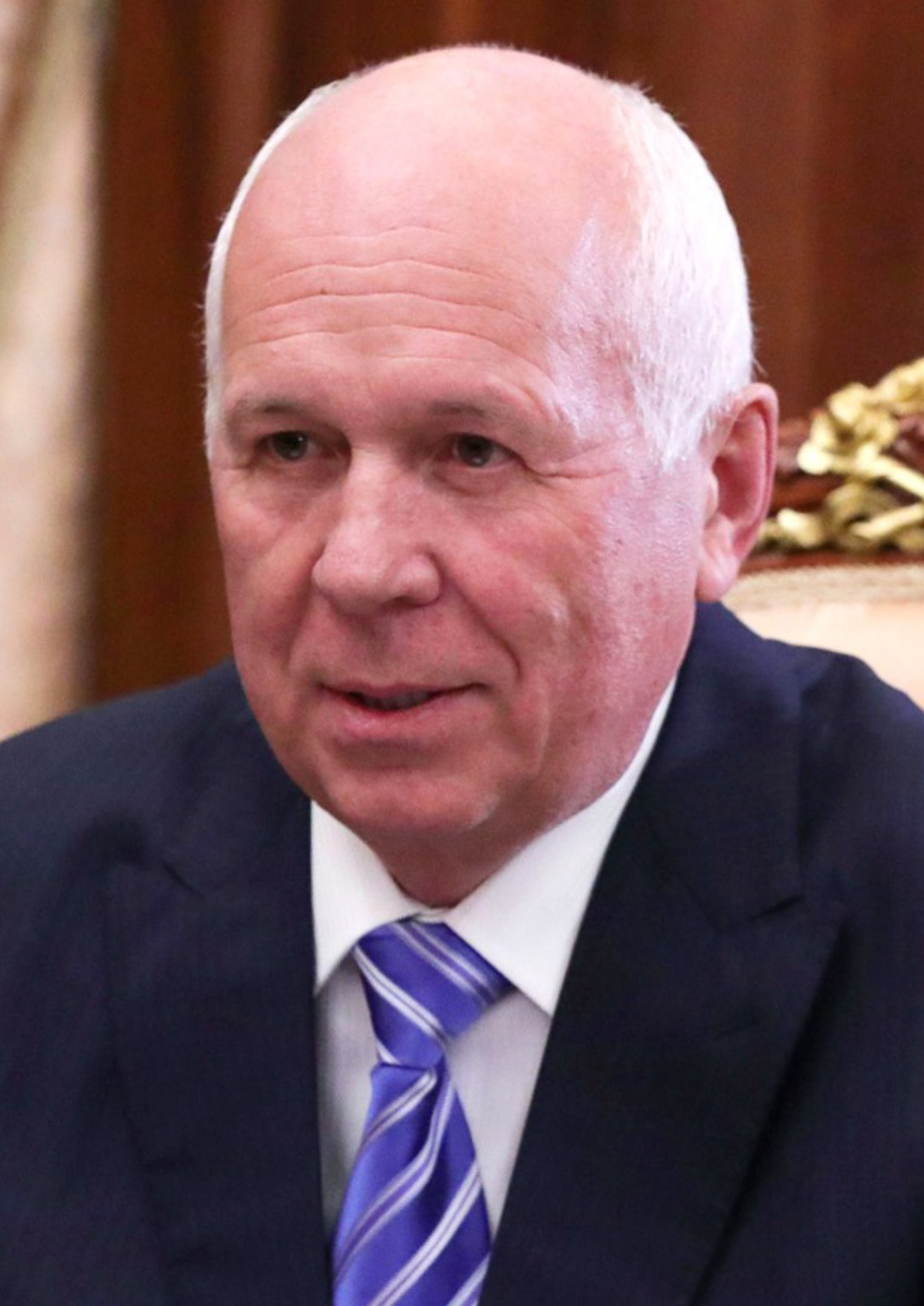
- Chemezov in 2022

CEO of Rostec Corporation
- Incumbent
- Assumed office 3 December 2007

Personal details
- Born: 20 August 1952 (age 74) Cheremkovo, Irkutsk Oblast, Soviet Union
- Party: United Russia
- Spouse: Yekaterina Ignatova
- Children: 4
- Education: Military Academy of the General Staff of the Armed Forces of Russia; Baykalsky State University of Economics and Law

Sergey Viktorovich Chemezov (Note: In this name that follows East Slavic naming customs, the patronymic is Viktorovich and the family name is Chemezov.) (Russian: Сергей Викторович Чемезов; born 20 August 1952) is a Russian businessman and politician who is the CEO of Rostec Corporation, a state-owned defense conglomerate. A former KGB agent and high-ranking general, Chemezov befriended Vladimir Putin when both were stationed in East Germany in the 1980s. In 2007, Putin appointed him as CEO of Rostec.

The Pandora Papers leaks revealed that Chemezov and his family maintained a large network of offshore wealth, including a $600 million superyacht.

== Biography ==
Chemezov was born on 20 August 1952 in the city of Cheremkhovo in Irkutsk Oblast.

Chemezov graduated with honours from Irkutsk Institute of National Economy (presently Baikal State University of Economics and Law) in 1975 and then completed his postgraduate education at the Military Academy of the General Staff of the Armed Forces of Russia. Chemezov has a doctorate in economics and is also a professor and full member of the Military Academy.

At the Irkutsk Scientific and Research Institute of Rare and Nonferrous Metals, Chemezov provided economic assessment of deposits as an engineer, a research associate, and chief laboratory assistant for six months from 15 October 1975 to 28 April 1976 while he was waiting for his paperwork to process to enter the ranks of the KGB.

=== East Germany and Putin ===
From 1980 to 1988 as KGB, he worked at "Luch" Research-Industrial Association which was the KGB surveillance operation gathering scientific and technical intelligence in the communist controlled German Democratic Republic (GDR). From 1983 to 1988, Chemezov served as the head of the Luch Association representative office in East Germany, where he met Vladimir Putin and Nikolay Tokarev. Tokarev, Chemezov and Putin worked for their KGB boss Lazar Matveev while in East Germany and both Chemezov and Putin lived in the same block of flats in Dresden. There they became friends. According to their colleague and former KGB officer Vladimir Gortanov (also known as Usoltsev) (Russian: Владимир Гортанов (Усольцев)), Chemezov worked in Directorate K, which is counterintelligence, and attempted to recruit KGB operatives from West Germany's counterintelligence community especially the West German military counterintelligence or at least from the West German criminal police. (Note: Allegedly, in addition to recruiting students from Latin America, Vladimir Putin was interested in recruiting agents among East Germans who had relatives abroad, especially in West Germany. Chemezov's and Putin's headquarters wanted information about the Bavarian located United States military base "Flint Barracks" (German: Flint Kaserne) (Note: Flint Kaserne was established in 1936 as an "SS Führer School" for the SS-Verfügungstruppe and was renamed on August 8, 1937, as one of the first SS-Junkerschule) at Bad Tölz, which housed the 1st Special Forces Battalion of the 10th Special Forces Group during the 1980s, and the military training grounds in Münster and Wildflecken. Putin searched for East Germans who had families in those regions or people who wanted to emigrate there. Putin also recruited foreigners who studied at the Dresden University of Technology because he wanted good prospects that would become future sources of information.)

From 1988 to 1996, Chemezov, as the KGB controller with the 3rd department of the 11th department of the 5th department of the KGB, was deputy CEO of the "Sovintersport" Foreign Trade Association under the leadership of Viktor Galaev (Russian: Виктор Галаев). (Note: The deputy head of the international department at the Russian Federation's Goskomsport (Russian: Госкомспорт) and also in the 3rd department of the 11th department of the 5th department of the KGB was KGB Colonel Emirik Merkuryevich Shevelev (Russian: Эмирик Меркурьевич Шевелев).) Sovintersport, which held a monopoly on Soviet sports with the West, is a portmanteau of Soviet, International, Export, and Sport formed by Putin and Chemezov.

=== Kremlin aide to Putin ===
From 1996 to 1999, he was chairman of the Department for Foreign Economic Relations within the Office for Presidential Affairs, serving under Putin. Later he transitioned to the position of chairman of the Department for Foreign Economic Relations of the Presidential Administration of Russia. During this time and although both Ukraine and Georgia objected, Chemezov was pivotal in securing for Russia, Russia's correct share from the former USSR's state property, state archives and state debts.

=== Head of Promexport and Rosoboronexport ===
From September 1999 to November 2000, Chemezov served as CEO of Promexport. In August 2000, he became a member of the Presidential Committee on Military and Engineering Cooperation between Russia and Foreign Countries. From November 2000 to April 2004, Chemezov served as first deputy CEO of Rosoboronexport and then as its CEO from 2004 to 2007. After Rosoboronexport obtained an 66% stake in VSMPO-Avisma in October 2006, Sergey Chemezov became chairman of VSMPO-AVISMA in November 2006.

=== CEO of Rostec ===
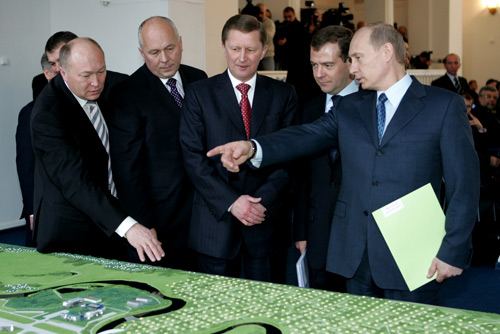
Chemezov with Deputy Prime Minister Sergei Ivanov, President Dmitry Medvedev and Prime Minister Vladimir Putin on 20 February 2008

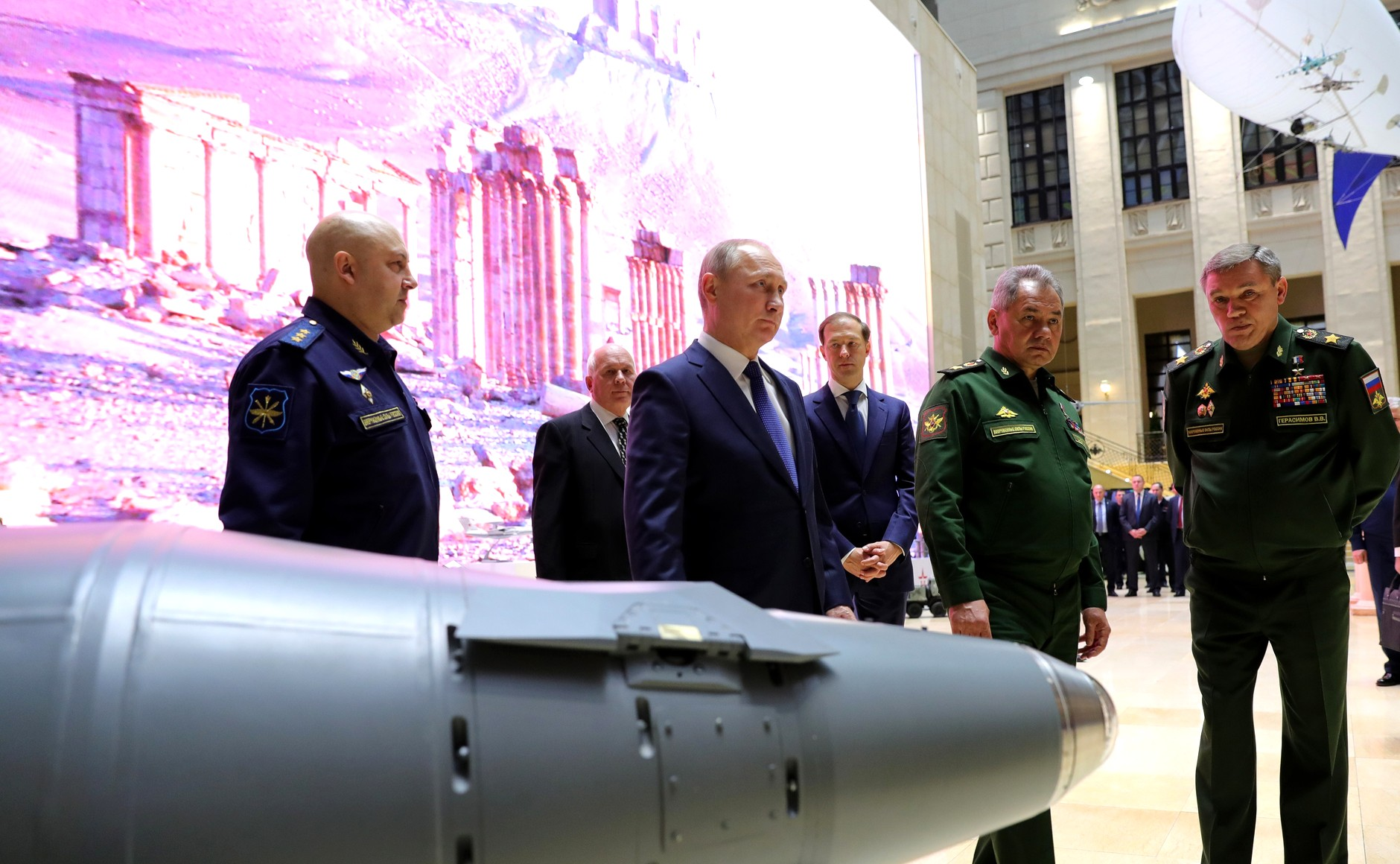
Chemezov with Sergey Surovikin, Vladimir Putin, Sergey Shoigu and Valery Gerasimov on 30 January 2018

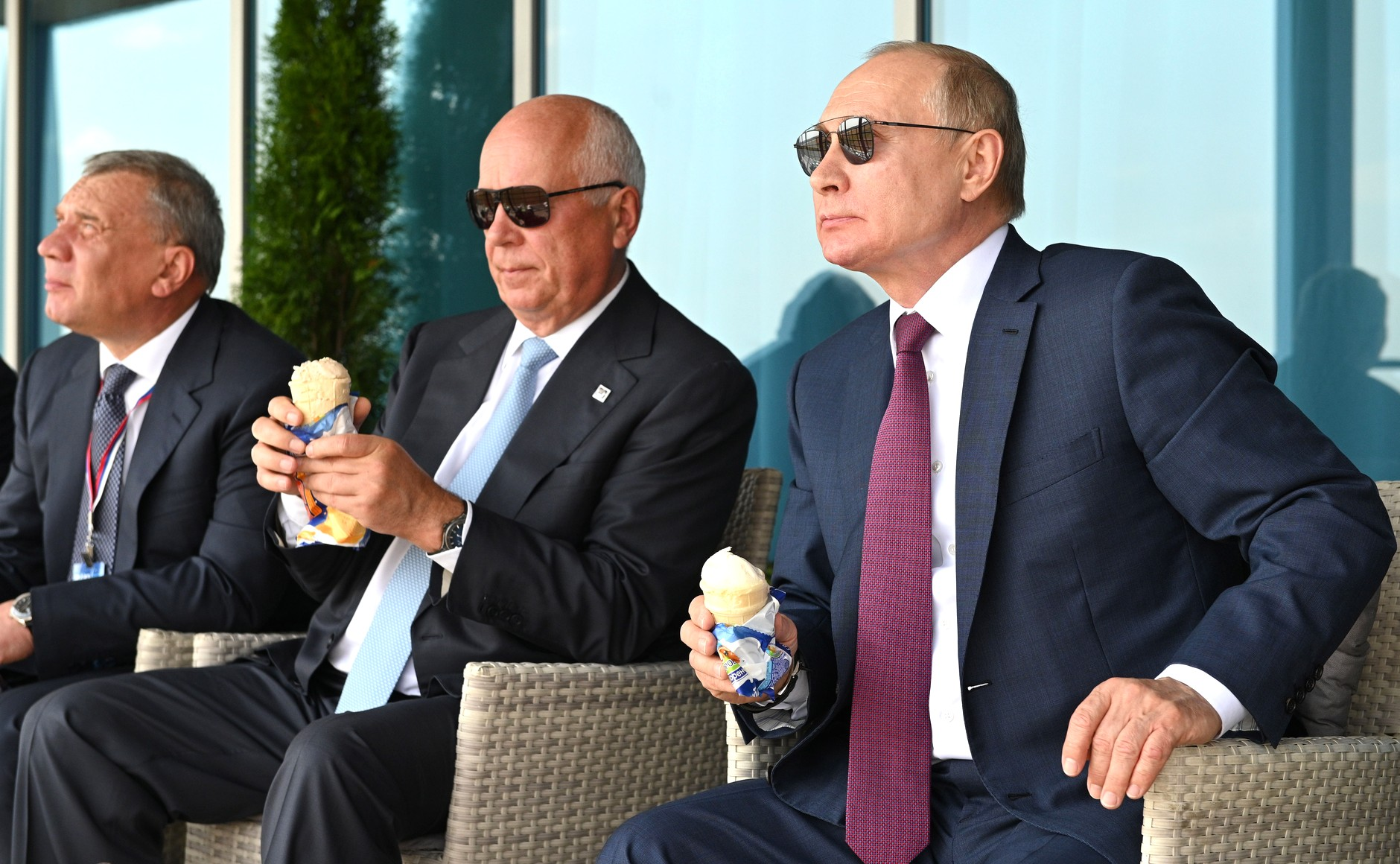
Chemezov with President Vladimir Putin and Yury Borisov on 20 July 2021

On 26 November 2007, Putin appointed by decree Chemezov as CEO of Russian Technologies Corporation, which was renamed Rostec in late 2012. He is credited with the consolidation of hundreds of state-owned enterprises that were made his responsibility as the fruit of government decree. In the decade after his appearance, the total volume of exports doubled to just under $14 billion.

At the 6th United Russia party convention held on 2 December 2006, Chemezov was elected to the party's Supreme Council. At the 7th party convention on 26 May 2012, Chemezov was reelected.

=== Sanctions ===
On 28 April 2014, he was barred by the Obama administration from entering the United States due to the annexation of Crimea by the Russian Federation.

He was sanctioned by the UK government in 2014 in relation to the Russo-Ukrainian War.

On 12 September 2014 as part of a much wider expansion of its programme, Chemezov was sanctioned by the European Union over the war in Ukraine. The same day, Chemezov was mentioned in a communiqué of the US Treasury because the firm he directs was subjected to sanctions as part of a sweeping ban on the Russian defence sector. The joint September 2014 sanctions packages had been agreed in principle at the 2014 NATO Wales summit.

Through Serguei Adoniev's charitable contributions, Chemezov had become an influence in the Novaya Gazeta press since 2014.

In February 2019, the Alexei Navalny linked Anti-Corruption Foundation discovered Chemezov's wife's Ekaterina Ignatova's apartment in the building located at the former site of the Moskva Hotel with a market value of about 5 billion rubles.

On 3 March 2022, the United States imposed visa restrictions and froze assets of Chemezov, his wife, sons, stepdaughter due to the 2022 Russian invasion of Ukraine.

On 15 March 2022, Spain temporarily seized Chemezov's $140m yacht 'Valerie' in Barcelona because of the 2022 Russian invasion of Ukraine.

== Offices ==
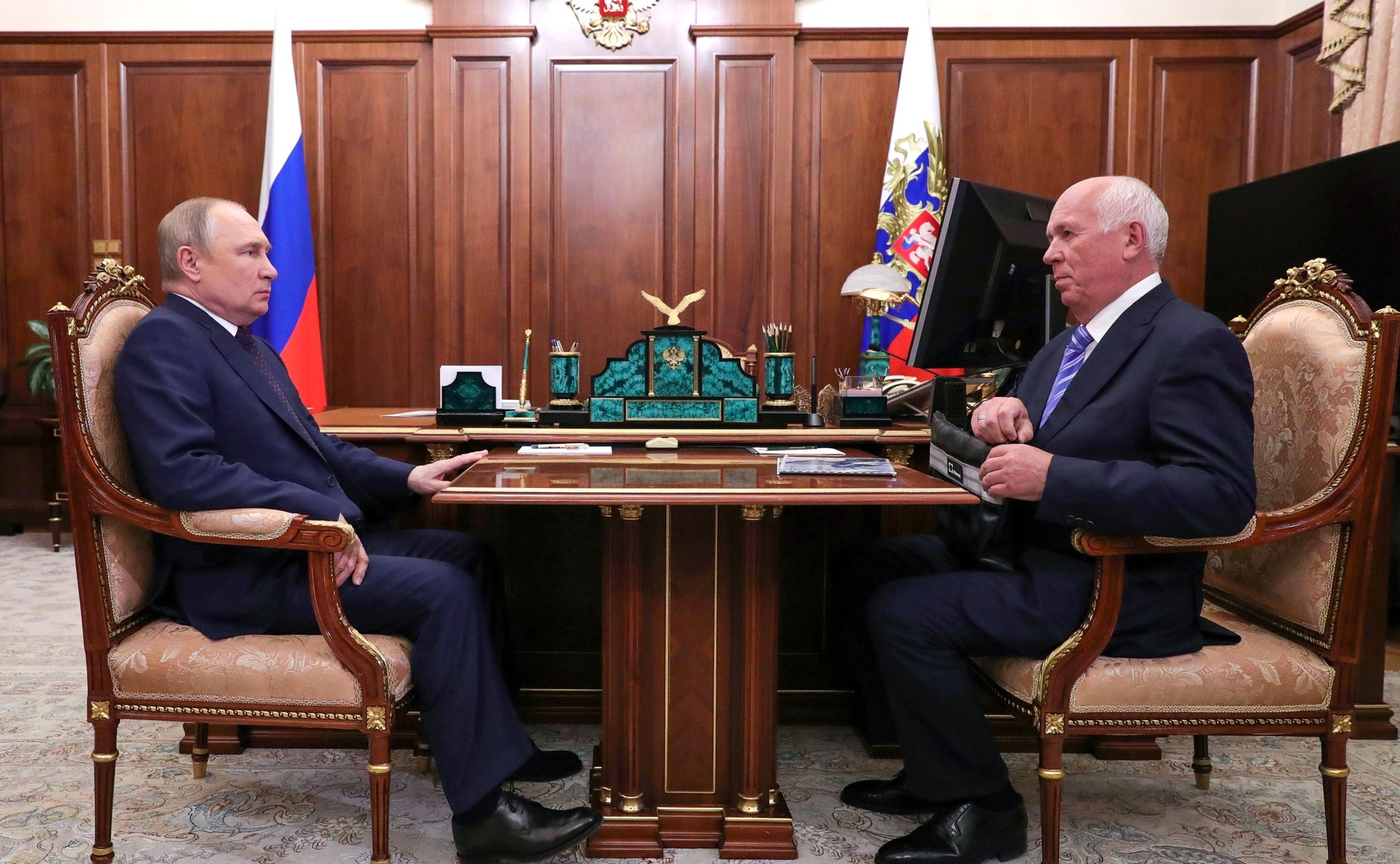
Chemezov with Vladimir Putin on 18 May 2022

Chemezov has served as a member of the Board of Directors for:

- United Aircraft Corporation JSC (since 2006)
- United Shipbuilding Corporation JSC (since 2007)
- Rusnano Corporation (since 2011)
- MMC Norilsk Nickel (March 2013)
- Aeroflot Russian Airlines (since 2011)
- Rosneft JSC (as Deputy Chairman of the Board of Directors since June 2013)

Chemezov has served as chairman of the Board of Directors for:

- United Industrial Corporation Oboronprom
- VSMPO-AVISMA (since 2006)
- ОАО «KAMAZ»
- AvtoVAZ
- Novikombank
- National Information and Settlement Systems LLC (since 2012)
- Rosoboronexport (since 2011; in August 2013 Chemezov was reelected for a third time)

== Academic activity, social activism and patronage ==
- Head of the Department of Military and Engineering Cooperation for the Scientific, Research and Educational Center of the Military Academy
- Head of the Department of Military and Engineering Cooperation and High-Tech at MGIMO
- Chairman of the Union of Mechanical Engineers, a public organization (since April 2007)
- President of the Russian Industrial Association of Employers in Mechanical Engineering (since April 2007)
- Chairman of the Supervisory Board of Kalashikov Military and Sport Association, an interregional public organization (since April 2010)
- Chairman of the Supervisory Board of the Foundation for the Support and Development of Physical Culture and Sport in the Russian Federation (Sport Foundation) (since 2005)
- Chairman of the Supervisory Board of the Russian Cycling Federation (since 2007)
- Chairman of the Supervisory Board of Plekhanov Russian University of Economics
- Chairman of the Supervisory Board of Gorchakov Public Diplomacy Foundation

== Family ==
Chemezov married his first wife Lyuba when he was 18 years old.

Chemezov is married to Yekaterina Ignatova, who is a trained planning engineer. She is a co-founder and seventy percent stockholder of Kate LLC, a company that develops and manufactures automatic gearboxes. Ignatova is also the majority shareholder (along with Gor Nahapetyan, the managing director of Troika Dialog) of Étage, a chain of nineteen restaurants in Moscow. She has an apartment at 28 on Povarskaya Street (Russian: Поварская улица) in Moscow.

Chemezov has four children.

He is a thirty percent shareholder of Medfarmtekhologia, a member of the board of directors of AvtoVAZEnergo, and chairman of the board of directors of Interbusinessgroup, which holds via structural companies such commercial organizations as Independent Insurance Group LLC, Oborontsement JSC, and Oborontsement-energo LLC. Since 2003, Stanislav Chemezov has been the co-owner (together with Vladimir Artyakov's son, Dmitri) of the Meridian hotel facilities in Gelendzhik. Stanislav Chemezov is the only founder of Interbusinessgroup LLC (Russian: ООО «Интербизнесгрупп») which has the shares in several construction companies, Russian Industrial Nanotechnologies (Russian: «Русские промышленные нанотехнологии»), I.A.D. business industry (Russian: «И.А.Д. бизнеc индустрия») and shares in Natural and Organic Products LLC (Russian: ООО «Натуральные и органические продукты») which is one of several companies clustered around Andrey Dolzhich's (Russian: Андрей Должич) Virgin Islands firm Natural and Organic Products, Inc that sells soil improvers to Persian Gulf countries including the soil near Bahrain's Royal Palace which now have palm trees growing in soil improvers from Dolzhich's firm. (Note: Serving in the KGB until 1991, Andrey Dolzhich (Russian: Андрей Должич) has many connections to Persian Gulf countries. In November 2005, Dolzhich's Natural and Organic Products, Inc and the Rosoboronexport subsidiary CJSC Tekhkom entered into a joint venture allowing its employees to be in Rosoboronexport offices globally.)

According to other information accessed in May 2009, Chemezov's second son was studying in a medical institute. His youngest son Sergey was in primary school and his daughter was a graduate student at MGIMO University.

== Awards ==
- Order For Merit to the Fatherland of the 2nd class (2012)
- Order For Merit to the Fatherland of the 3rd class (20 August 2007) for military and engineering cooperation with foreign countries
- Order For Merit to the Fatherland of the 4th class
- Order of Friendship (2009)
- National Order of the Legion of Honour (France, March 2010) for contributing to the cooperation between France and Russia in high-tech manufacturing
- Order of Saint Righteous Grand Duke Dmitry Donskoy (Russian Orthodox Church)
- Order of Holy Prince Daniel of Moscow (Russian Orthodox Church)
- Order of Saint Seraphim of Sarov of the 2nd class (Russian Orthodox Church)
- Russian Government Award in science and engineering for 2004
- Person of the Year in 2004 in the area of Defense Industry Complex
- Leader of the Russian Economy in 2004, awarded by the International Forum "World Experience and Russian Economy"
- Suvorov Prize awarded by the Military Academy
- On 21 April 2011, Chemezov was granted the status of an Honoured Resident of the city of Irkutsk for prominent achievements in the area of social, economic and cultural development of the city of Irkutsk

== See also ==
- List of Heroes of the Russian Federation
