= Arthur Gilbert (real estate developer) =

English-American art collector (1913–2001)

Sir Arthur Gilbert
- Born: Abraham Bernstein; May 16, 1913; London, England
- Died: September 2, 2001 (aged 88); Beverly Hills, California, US
- Occupations: Real estate developer, art collector, philanthropist
- Known for: Gilbert Collection
- Spouses: Rosalinde Gilbert; Marjorie Haworth
- Children: 1

Sir Arthur Gilbert (born Abraham Bernstein; May 16, 1913 – September 2, 2001) was a British-born American real estate developer, art collector and philanthropist.

== Early life ==
Arthur Gilbert was born as Abraham Bernstein on May 16, 1913, in Hackney, London. He grew up in Golders Green, London.

His father was Lazarus Bernstein, a furrier, and his mother was named Bella. His parents were Jewish Polish immigrants who had moved to London in 1897, and they also owned land and built a house in Rishon LeZion. He and his parents attended the dedication ceremony of the Hebrew University in Jerusalem in 1925.

He was educated at boarding school from the age of four.

== Career ==
Gilbert was a successful businessman in England, selling gowns designed by Rosalinde, his first wife. He immigrated to the United States to obviate taxes in 1949. Once in the Los Angeles area, he became a real estate developer. He developed industrial sites under the name of the Gilbert Financial Corporation.

== Philanthropy ==
Gilbert served on the board of trustees of the Los Angeles County Museum of Art (LACMA). He loaned a large collection of objets d'art to the Museum from the 1970s to the mid-1990s. He discontinued the agreement due to limited space at the LACMA.

In 1996, Gilbert took back the collection of "gold, silver, mosaics, gold boxes and enamel portrait miniatures", worth about US $300 million, and donated it to the British nation. Jacob Rothschild, 4th Baron Rothschild, the Chairman of the Heritage Lottery Fund, agreed to build a US$30 million gallery inside Somerset House to display the collection and attract visitors. The new gallery was dedicated by Queen Elizabeth The Queen Mother in 2001. The Gilbert Collection stayed there from 2001 to 2008. It can now be viewed at the Victoria & Albert Museum. In 2018, the V&A embarked on a research project into the provenance of the Gilbert Collection, culminating in the 'Concealed Histories. Uncovering the Story of Nazi Looting' exhibition.

Additionally, Gilbert supported Jewish charitable causes in Europe and Israel. He made charitable contributions to the February 1941 Foundation, a non-profit organization which honors Dutch people who helped Jews escape from Nazi barbarism during World War II. In Israel, he was the founder of the Arthur and Rosalinde Gilbert Center for the Advancement of Scientific Research and made donations to erect buildings on the campus of the Hebrew University in Jerusalem. He also made charitable contributions to the Technion – Israel Institute of Technology in Haifa.

He was knighted by Queen Elizabeth II in 1999.

== Personal life ==
He married Rosalinde Gilbert, a dress designer, in 1934, and took her surname. They had a son, Colin. After Rosalinde died in 1995, he married Marjorie Haworth in 1997. They resided in Beverly Hills, California. He became a naturalised American citizen.

== Death and legacy ==
Gilbert died of a heart attack on September 2, 2001, at his private residence in Beverly Hills, California. He was eighty-eight years old.

The Rosalinde and Arthur Gilbert Foundation is an active philanthropic organization. For example, it donated US$6 million to the Younes and Soraya Israel Studies Center at the University of California, Los Angeles (UCLA) in 2006.
