= Zarubezhneft =

Russian oil and gas company

Zarubezhneft JSC
- Company type: State controlled (Joint stock company)
- Industry: Oil and gas
- Founded: 1967
- Headquarters: Moscow, Russia
- Key people: Sergei Kudryashov (General Director); Yevgeny Murov (Chairman of the Board of Directors)
- Revenue: $2.54 billion (2017)
- Net income: $95.8 million (2016)
- Owner: Russian Federation (100%)
- Subsidiaries: Rusvietpetro
- Website: www.zarubezhneft.ru

JSC Zarubezhneft (Russian: Зарубежнефть) is a Russian state-controlled oil company based in Moscow that specializes in exploration, development and operation of oil and gas fields outside Russian territory. Sergei Kudryashov is the company's General Director and Yevgeny Murov is chairman of the board.

== Overview ==
According to the company's website, Zarubezhneft's main activities are: exploration, development and operation of oil and gas fields abroad; design, construction and operation of oil refineries, tank farms and pipeline systems; application of advanced Russian technologies for oil field development; testing and export of modern hi-tech methods for oil recovery enhancement and export-import operations for technological equipment supply.

The company was founded in 1967 by the Soviet government to operate in friendly states.

Zarubezhneft's most notable operations are in Vietnam, where it has several joint ventures with the Vietnamese company PetroVietnam, including the joint venture company Vietsovpetro.

In 2009, Zarubezhneft's General Director Nikolai Brunich was awarded with Vietnam’s Labour Order, first class, in recognition of his contributions to the successful operation of Vietsovpetro and cooperation between Vietnam and Russia. In 2022, the company's revenue amounted to 73 billion rubles.

== International operations ==
Zarubezhneft carries out its activities in:

- Vietnam
- Cuba
- Bosnia and Herzegovina
- Russia (Nenets Autonomous Okrug)
- Uzbekistan
- Egypt

== Ecology ==
In 2021 World Wide Fund for Nature admitted JSC Zarubezhneft along with Tatneft the most environmentally friendly company in the oil industry.

== Saddam's oil vouchers ==
Zarubezhneft received 174.5 million barrels worth oil vouchers from the abused Oil-for-Food Programme, according to the paper "The Beneficiaries of Saddam's Oil Vouchers: The List of 270".

== See also ==
- Petroleum industry in Russia
