= Gilbert Collection =

Collection of objets d'art in the Victoria and Albert Museum, London

Coordinates: 51°29′48″N 0°10′19″W

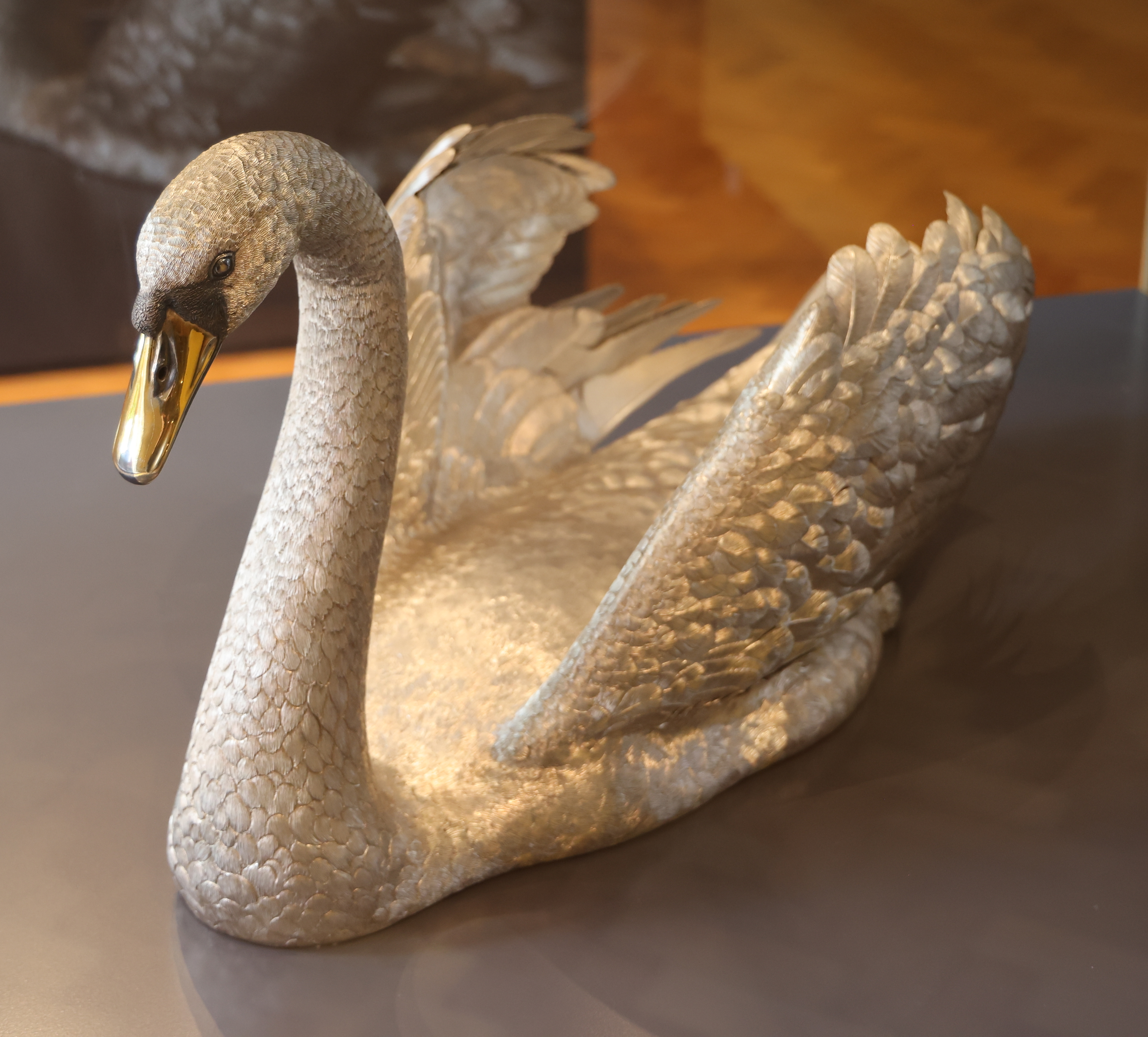
Swan centrepiece from the Gilbert Collection

The Rosalinde and Arthur Gilbert Collection is a collection of objets d'art formed by the English-born businessman Sir Arthur Gilbert, who made most of his fortune in the property business in California. After initially becoming interested in silver, he assembled a large collection of decorative arts, which he gave the British nation in 1996. It now has a permanent home in the Victoria and Albert Museum in London.

The V&A describes the objects as: "many in precious materials, and often on a small scale. It is famous for European and British masterpieces including gold and silver, gold boxes, painted enamels and mosaics", these last mostly micromosaics.

== History ==
For decades, the collection was on display at the Los Angeles County Museum of Art (LACMA), and Gilbert had promised eventually to make it a permanent gift. However, he decided to give the collection to his native country, after a dispute with LACMA regarding the collection's placement and display.

In 2000, it went on public display as "The Gilbert Collection" in a suite of seventeen galleries at Somerset House in London, the audio guide narrated by the actor Tony Clarkin. Formerly Private Curator to the Gilbert Collection, Jeanette Hanisee Gabriel was appointed "Honorary Curator of the Gilbert Collection" by the Gilbert Collection Trust in June 2001.

The exhibition was fitted out under the supervision of the silver expert Timothy Schroder, and it continued until 27 January 2008. The space then became the Embankment Galleries, an exhibition space for contemporary art. Meanwhile, the collection was incorporated into the Victoria and Albert Museum, where a new display in rooms 70–73 opened on 30 June 2009.

In early 2011, fifty objects from the collection were returned, by the provisions of a long-term loan, to LACMA.

== Bibliography ==
- Minter, Alice; Morris, Sophie (2023). The Art of Stone: Masterpieces from the Rosalinde and Arthur Gilbert collection. London: V&A Publishing. ISBN 9781838510411.
- Minter, Alice (2021). Masterpieces in Miniature: Treasures from the Rosalinde and Arthur Gilbert Collection. Amsterdam: DIVA. ISBN 9789078487197.
- Schuhmacher, Jacques (2024). Nazi-Era Provenance of Museum Collections (PDF). London: UCL Press. pp. 71–76, 126–141. ISBN 9781800086906.
- Zech, Heike (2015). Gold boxes: Masterpieces from the Rosalinde and Arthur Gilbert Collection. Lo: V&A Publishing. ISBN 9781851778409.
- Zech, Heike (2018). Micromosaics: Masterpieces from the Rosalinde and Arthur Gilbert Collection. London: V&A Publishing. ISBN 1851779701.
