= Jakob Goldschmidt =

German-Jewish banker (1882–1955)

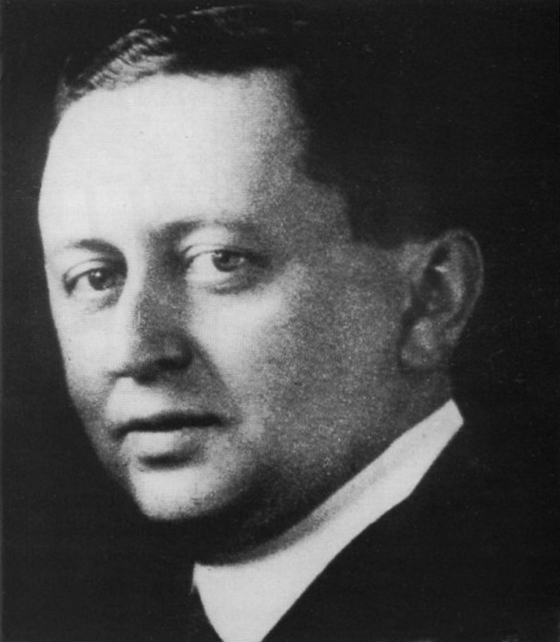
Jakob Goldschmidt

Jakob Goldschmidt (born 31 December 1882 in Eldagsen; died 23 September 1955 in New York) was a German-Jewish banker.

== Career ==
Goldschmidt studied banking from H. Oppenheimer in Hanover. In 1907, he worked at the Nationalbank für Deutschland in Berlin. In 1909, Goldschmidt founded the private bank Schwarz. Goldschmidt held up to 123 supervisory board mandates, including in UFA, a film company founded in 1917, and chemical company IG Farben (1931–1932).

== Art collector ==
Goldschmidt's extensive art collection was plundered and auctioned off by the Nazis in the 1940s, and has been the subject of restitution claims. In 1963, a Dutch court ruled that an Honore Daumier bronze sculpture, Ratiapil, should be returned from a museum in Cologne. In 2002, the heirs of Jakob Goldschmidt sought the return of a painting Portrait of a Young Girl in a Bow Window, attributed to Nikolaus Alexander Mair von Landshut from the Ashmolean Museum in Oxford.

== Literature ==
- Michael Jurk: Jakob Goldschmidt. About the life and work of a Jewish banker 1882–1955. Master's thesis from the University of Mainz. Mainz 1984.
- Gerald D. Feldman : Jakob Goldschmidt, the history of banking crisis of 1931 and the problem of freedom of maneuver in the Weimar economy. In: Torn Interwar Period. Economic and historical contributions. Commemorative for Knut Borchardt. Baden-Baden 1994, p307.
- Gerald D. Feldman: Jewish bankers and the crisis of the Weimar Republic (Leo Baeck Memorial Lecture. Volume 39). New York 1995.
- John F. Oppenheimer (editor) u. a .: Lexicon of Judaism. 2nd Edition. Bertelsmann Lexikon Verlag, Gütersloh u. a. 1971, ISBN 3-570-05964-2 , column 249.
- Hans-Christian Rohde: We are Germans with a Jewish religion. History of the Jews in Eldagsen and Springe, Bennigsen, Gestorf, Völksen (Hallermunter writings. 2). Museum in the castle courtyard, Springe 1999. p. 40–41.
- Jakob Goldschmidt: Seven years: Thoughts on the German economy 1924-1931 (Gedanken in sieben Jahren deutscher Wirtschaft), 2015
