= Reuschel =

Reuschel is a surname. Notable people with the surname include:

- Paul Reuschel (born 1947), American baseball player
- Rick Reuschel (born 1949), American baseball player, brother of Paul

== See also ==
- Donner & Reuschel, German bank
- Bankhaus Reuschel & Co., German bank
- Ruschel
