= Bankhaus Bauer =

German private bank

Bankhaus Bauer AG
- Company type: Aktiengesellschaft
- Industry: Private bank
- Founded: 1931; 95 years ago
- Headquarters: Stuttgart, Germany
- Products: Private banking
- Revenue: 303,6 Mio. Euro (2018)
- Website: www.bankhausbauer.de

The Bankhaus Bauer AG is a German private bank headquartered in Stuttgart. The bank is a member of the Association of German Banks and its deposit protection fund as well as a member of ATM network CashPool.

As universal bank Bankhaus Bauer offers all banking services. Traditionally as private bank it focuses on wealth private and business clients as well as corporate clients.

== History ==
The business was founded in 1931 as a limited partnership business entity by banker Richard Bauer under the name Bankhaus Bauer KG in Stuttgart. During World War II the business offices were destroyed in a bomb attack. At short notice the headquarter was moved to Schwäbisch Gmünd in 1944. After the war finished the headquarter was moved back to Stuttgart in 1945. In 1986 the business was converted into the joint-stock company Bankhaus Bauer AG.

In 1992 the Schuppli-Gruppe in Wiesbaden, the Hypothekenbank in Essen AG and the Hypothekenbank in Berlin AG joined the business. The shares of the Schuppli-Gruppe and the Hypothekenbank in Berlin AG were taken over by the Commerzbank AG in 1994, which then became majority shareholder of the Bankhaus Bauer AG. In 2001 the Schuppli-Gruppe, which also owned the Düsseldorf Hypothekenbank AG, again purchased the majority of the bank. Under executive board spokesman Wolfgang Kuhn the banks investment volume between 1997 and 2006 was increased to more than 700 million Euros. In May 2006 Kuhn left the Bankhaus Bauer AG at his own request.

In the light of the new Mortgage Bond Act the Schuppli-Gruppe merged its two subsidiaries Düsseldorfer Hypothekenbank AG and Bankhaus Bauer AG in 2006. The Bankhaus Bauer AG was added to Düsseldorfer Hypothekenbank AG and operated as its non-independent branch.

In 2010 the Bankhaus Bauer AGs re-founding or spin-off took place. Majority shareholder of the new business was the Raiffeisenbank Reutte reg.Gen.m.b.H. from the Austrian Reutte in Tirol. In March 2015 the BB Beteiligungs GmbH in Essen purchased the shares the Raiffeisenbank Reutte reg.Gen.m.b.H. had owned. The businesses and its clients continued uninterrupted with the change in ownership. In January 2017 there was an expansion with the opening of a new branch in Essen in January 2017 for which BHF-Bank-Manager André Weber was employed manage the private customer service in Essen.

== Technology ==
The business is a member of the cooperative data center Fiducia & GAD IT AG and uses its Core banking System their software agree.

== See also ==
- List of banks in Germany
