= Merkur Bank =

German private bank

MERKUR Privatbank KGaA
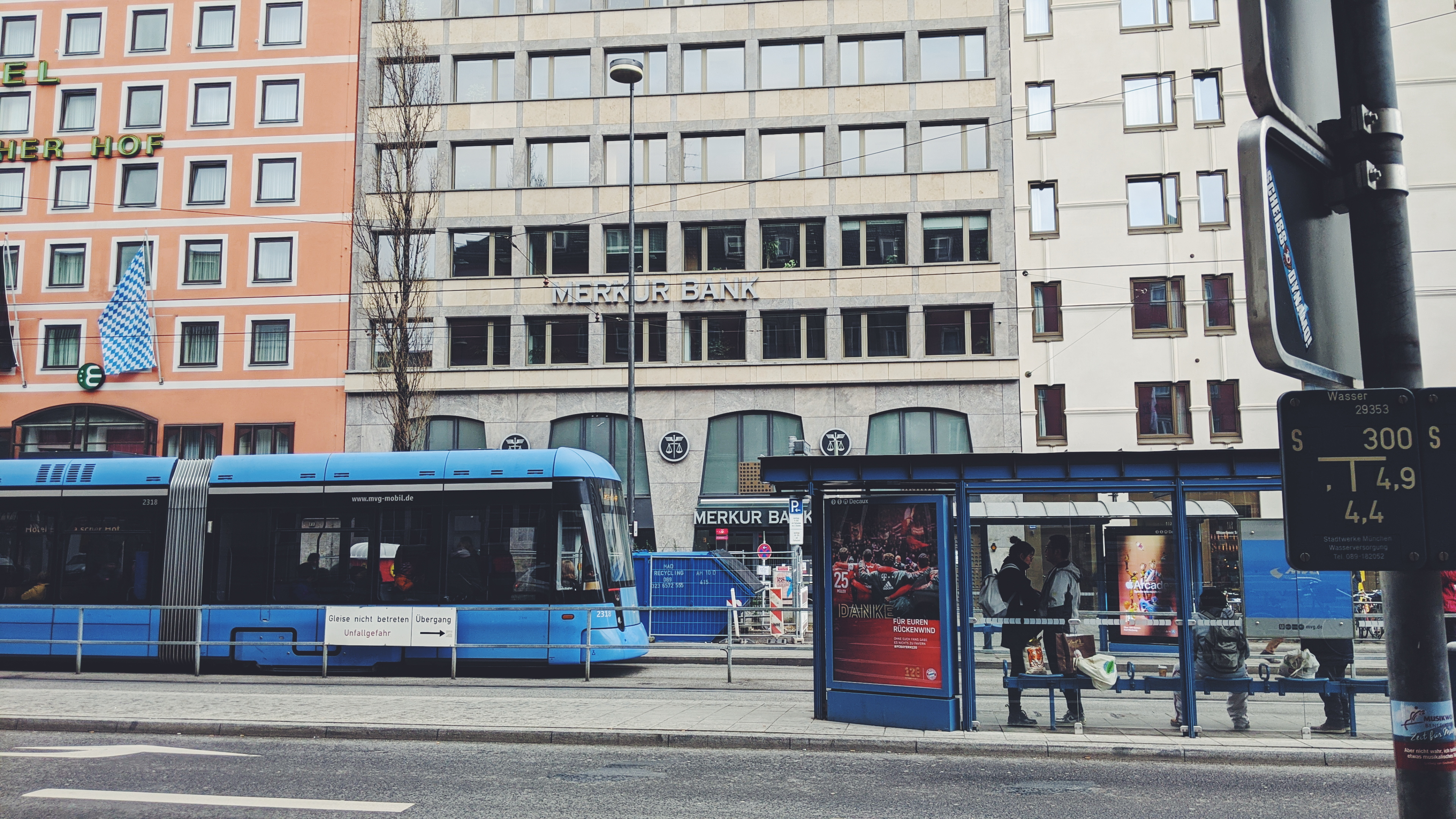
- Headquarters of the MERKUR PRIVATBANK in Munich
- Formerly: MERKUR BANK KGaA; MERKUR BANK GmbH & Co. KG; Merkur Bank Horowicz KG
- Company type: Partnership limited by shares
- Traded as: FWB: MBK
- Industry: Financial services
- Founded: 1959; 67 years ago
- Founders: Dr. Zanwel Horowicz; Motek Horowicz; Hela Horowicz
- Headquarters: Munich, Germany
- Area served: Germany
- Key people: Dr. Marcus Lingel (Chairman); Claus Herrmann; Dr. Andreas E. H. Maurer
- Products: Private banking Corporate banking Asset management Investment banking
- Revenue: 82,900,000 (2021)
- Operating income: 19,900,000 (2021)
- Net income: 9,890,000 (2022)
- Total assets: 3,228,180,000 (2022)
- Number of employees: 468 (2022)
- Website: www.merkur-bank.de

Merkur Privatbank is a German private bank with headquarters in Munich that is owner-managed.

== History ==
In 1959 Zanwel Horowicz as well as Motek and Hela Horowicz founded Merkur Bank Horowicz KG in Munich, which at that time was mainly limited to the sale of medals and currencies.

In 1986 a group of investors led by Siegfried Lingel took over the Merkur Bank Horowicz KG and rebranded it to MERKUR BANK GmbH & Co. KG. At the same time, MERKUR BANK GmbH & Co. KG began universal banking business with the main focus on property development financing, and in 1991 opened its first branches in Vogtland, Saxony and Thuringia. The service portfolio was expanded to include leasing refinancing in 1995.

As part of the IPO in 1999 at the Munich Stock Exchange, MERKUR BANK GmbH & Co. KG became MERKUR BANK KGaA. The generational change began in 2002, when Marcus Lingel was appointed to the extended management of MERKUR BANK KGaA as General Manager alongside management member Claus Herrmann. Following the departure of Siegfried Lingel, Marcus Lingel then took over as Chairman of the General Management of MERKUR BANK KGaA in 2008. In addition, however, he has continued to act as a personally liable partner of MERKUR BANK KGaA since October 2005, alongside his father Siegfried Lingel.

The business area of investment and financing for entrepreneurial investors was first established in 2016 and since the acquisition of the German Bankhaus Schilling & Co in 2019, has been a fundamental part of the banking business, especially for high net worth individuals.

=== Takeover of Bank Schilling & Co. AG ===
In October 2019, MERKUR BANK took over significant parts of the banking business from the German bank Schilling & Co. and has since been operating under the new brand name of MERKUR PRIVATBANK.

== Clients ==
=== Private clients ===
In addition to asset management in private banking, MERKUR PRIVATBANK also focuses on the sector of securities and interest rate investments and private accounts.

=== Business clients ===
The MERKUR PRIVATBANK focuses on the financing of medium-sized companies, property developers and leasing refinancing, as well as the provision of business accounts.

== Deposit guarantee ==
For the MERKUR PRIVATBANK KGaA, the legal deposit guarantee of up to 100,000 euros per person is covered by the Entschädigungseinrichtung deutscher Banken (compensatory fund of German banks).

In addition to this the bank is a member of the deposit guarantee fund of the Association of German Banks. The fund secures deposits of natural persons and private charities which exceed 100,000 euros, per person an amount of up to 20 percent of the liable equity of the respective bank. In the case of the MERKUR PRIVATBANK KGaA the backup line amounts to 22 million euros per customer.

== Core banking system ==
The MERKUR PRIVATBANK is connected to the cooperative computer centre of Fiducia & GAD IT in Karlsruhe and uses their banking software agree21.

== See also ==
- List of banks in Germany
