= Internationales Bankhaus Bodensee =

German private bank

Coordinates: 47.656452°N 9.46263°E

Internationales Bankhaus Bodensee AG
- Type: Joint-stock company
- Industry: Private bank
- Founded: 1996
- Headquarters: Friedrichshafen, Germany
- Products: Financial adviser, credit financing
- Revenue: €45.1 million (2018)
- Members: 179 (2018)
- Website: www.ibb-ag.de

Internationales Bankenhaus Bodensee AG is a private bank headquartered in Friedrichshafen. 94.42 percent of its shares belong to the Würth-Gruppe and the remaining 5.58 percent are held by the Hypo Vorarlberg Bank.

== Business model ==
The bank is a niche supplier in the Bodensee area for investment consultancy of wealthy private customers and the support of middle class businesses with border-crossing interests. The bank is known to be leading in credit financing of soccer clubs, with almost half of all the first and second league clubs being on the bank's customer list.

== History ==
The bank was founded in 1996 under the leadership of the Landesbank Baden-Württemberg and the Vorarlberger Landes- und Hypothekenbank. Through merging the market shares of the Landeskreditbank Baden-Württemberg, the LG and the Südwest LB to the LBBW, the ownership of the Landeskreditbank was passed to the LBBW. Due to the integration of the BW-Bank and the following reorientation, the LBBW sold its shares in 2005 and 2006 to the Würth-Gruppe, which held 88.55% of the Internationales Bankhaus Bodensee AG shares until 2009. In spring 2009 the Würth-Gruppe bought the 1.45% of shares the management had held up until that point, increasing shares to 90%.

== See also ==
- List of banks in Germany
