= VBU Volksbank im Unterland eG =

- Company type: Eingetragene Genossenschaft, e.G. (cooperative)
- Industry: Financial services
- Founded: 1904; 122 years ago
- Headquarters: Schwaigern, Baden-Wuerttemberg, Germany
- Key people: Siegfried Seitz (chairman), Jürgen Leiß
- Services: Banking services
- Total assets: 919.1 million Euros (2020)
- Number of employees: 214 (2020)
- Website: www.vbu-volksbank.de

VBU Volksbank im Unterland is a German cooperative bank situated in Schwaigern, Baden-Wuerttemberg. The bank is a member of the German Cooperative Financial Group and of its representative association, the Bundesverband der Deutschen Volksbanken und Raiffeisenbanken, as well as of the Baden-Wuerttembergischer Genossenschaftsverband (Association of Baden-Wuerttemberg’s cooperatives).

== History ==
The bank's history is marked by several mergers of small cooperative banks from 1971 to 2002. Like these small institutes, VBU Volksbank im Unterland eG is founded on Friedrich Wilhelm Raiffeisen's and Franz Hermann Schulze-Delitzsch's cooperative philosophy.

== Network of branches ==
The bank has its headquarters in Schwaigern and branches in Lauffen am Neckar, Leingarten, Massenbachhausen, Neckarwestheim, Nordheim, Schwaigern, Schwaigern-Massenbach, Schwaigern-Stetten. There are also three self-service-branches in Leingarten-Schluchtern, Nordheim-Nordhausen and in Schwaigern-Stetten.

== Financial Services Network ==
VBU Volksbank im Unterland eG offers a full-range of banking services. Therefore, the bank cooperates with partners from the Genossenschaftliche FinanzGruppe Volksbanken Raiffeisenbanken (Cooperative Financial Services Network), such as:

- Bausparkasse Schwäbisch Hall (cooperative home savings and loan company)
- Union Investment (asset manager and investment funds society)
- R+V Versicherung (insurance group)
- Teambank (offering "EasyCredit", e.g. consumer credits)
- DZ Bank (the cooperative bank's central bank)
- VR Leasing (offering leasing and factoring)
- DG Hyp (mortgage bank)

== Protection Scheme / Guarantee Fund ==
100 percent of the bank's customers' deposits are safeguarded by the "Sicherungseinrichtung des BVR" (The National Association of German Cooperative Banks' Protection Scheme).

== See also ==
- List of banks in Germany
