= Entschädigungseinrichtung deutscher Banken =

The Deposit Guarantee Scheme of German Banks (German: Entschädigungseinrichtung deutscher Banken) is a private institution legally responsible for guaranteeing the deposits of account holders of German banks in accordance with domestic legislation and EU directives. It is 100% owned by the Federal association of German banks. Other voluntary schemes exist alongside the mandatory scheme.

== History ==
The EdB was established on 24 August 1998 in compliance with the deposit and depositor protection law (EAEG). Since its establishment it has had to deal with several large scale compensations (IKB, Hypo Real Estate and Düsseldorfer Hypothekenbank). In 2008 the fund did not have enough assets to deal with the claims resulting from Lehman Brothers and the German state stepped in by providing a SoFFin guarantee, enabling the institution to raise 6.7 Billion Euros on the bond market.

== Purpose ==
The institution is charged with guaranteeing the statutory 100,000 Euro per account holder and bank. The domestic law provides for the guarantee to rise in steps to reach 437.500 Euro from 1 January 2025.

== Financing ==
According to the Federal budget the EdB had 700 million EUR in assets as of 31 of December 2011, an increase of 130 million euros over the previous year.

The fund is financed by contributions from the members of the Association of German Banks, according to a formula that is based 50% on some objective financial rations and 50% on the rating given to the bank by external ratings agencies.

== Other voluntary schemes ==
In Germany the different banking confederations provide voluntary schemes in addition to the mandatory public scheme.

- Deposit Protection Fund
- Depositor Compensation Scheme of the Association of German Public Sector Banks GmbH
- Deposit-Protection Fund of the Association of German Public Sector Banks e.V.
- German Saving Banks Association
- National Association of German Cooperative Banks
- The German Private Commercial Banks Compensation Scheme for Investors
