= Bankhaus Reuschel & Co. =

German bank

- Company type: Private bank
- Industry: Banking, financial services
- Founded: 1947
- Fate: Acquired
- Successor: Donner & Reuschel
- Headquarters: Munich, Germany
- Area served: Germany
- Products: Asset management, financing, real estate, insurance, investment research, family office services
- Parent: Donner & Reuschel (since 2010)

Bankhaus Reuschel & Co. was founded in 1947. It has been part of the Dresdner Bank AG Group since 1970 and joined the Allianz Group in 2001. It was acquired in 2010 by Donner & Reuschel.

In its business operations, Bankhaus Reuschel & Co. traditionally has focused on servicing middle market corporate customers and wealthy private clients.

The company has its head office in Munich, Germany. It provides private customers with relevant advice on asset management issues. This includes asset management, financing schemes, real estate, insurance, investment research, and family office services.

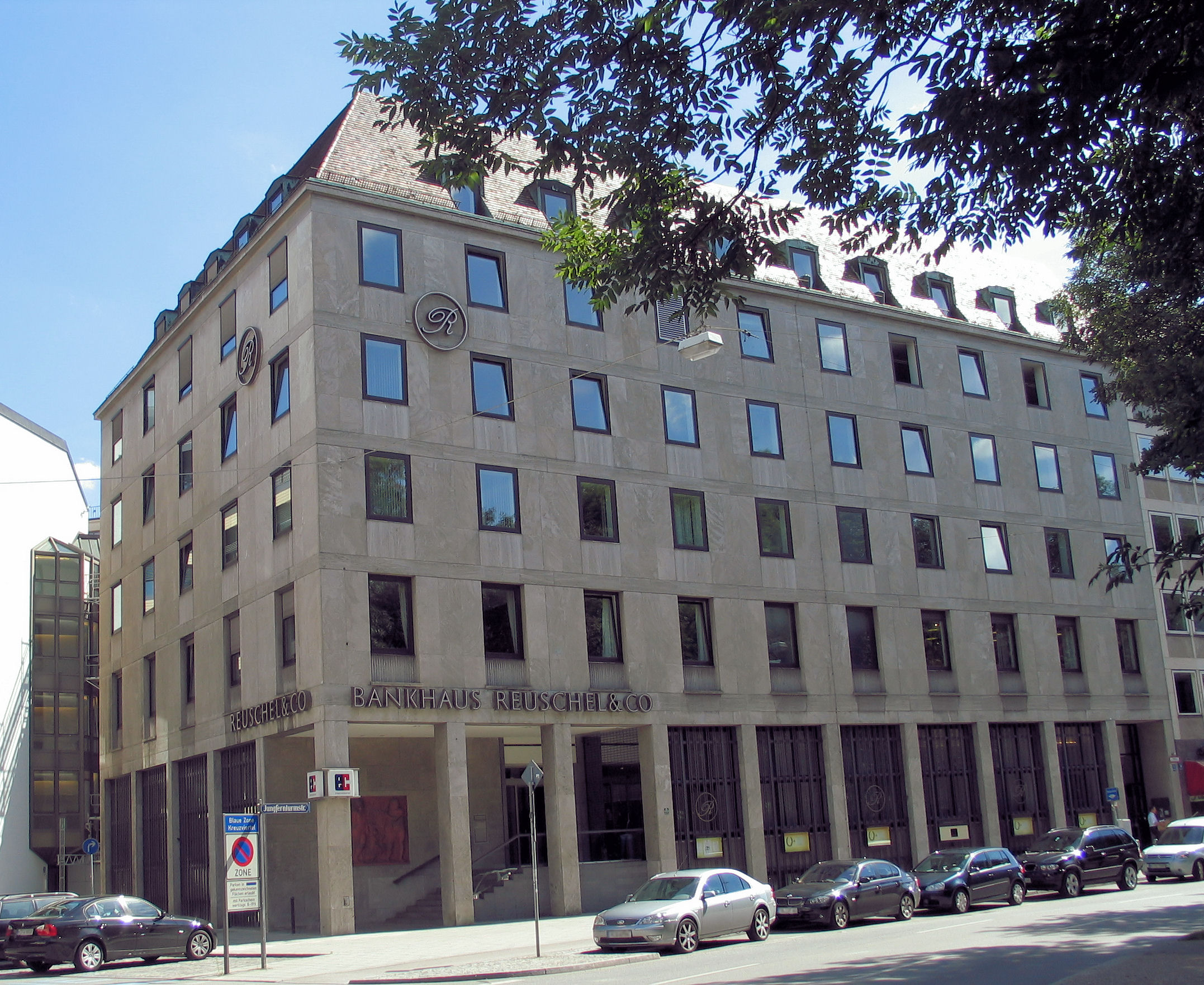
Bankhaus Reuschel & Co.: Operational Headquarters in Munich, Germany

== See also ==
- List of banks in Germany
