= Hoerner Bank =

German bank

- Company type: Aktiengesellschaft
- Industry: Financial services
- Founded: 1849
- Headquarters: Oststraße 77, 74072 Heilbronn, Germany
- Key people: Ralf Hirschfeld (CEO), Rolf Scheidt, Christoph Winkhart
- Website: www.hoernerbank.de
- Footnotes / references BIC: HOEB DE61 XXX

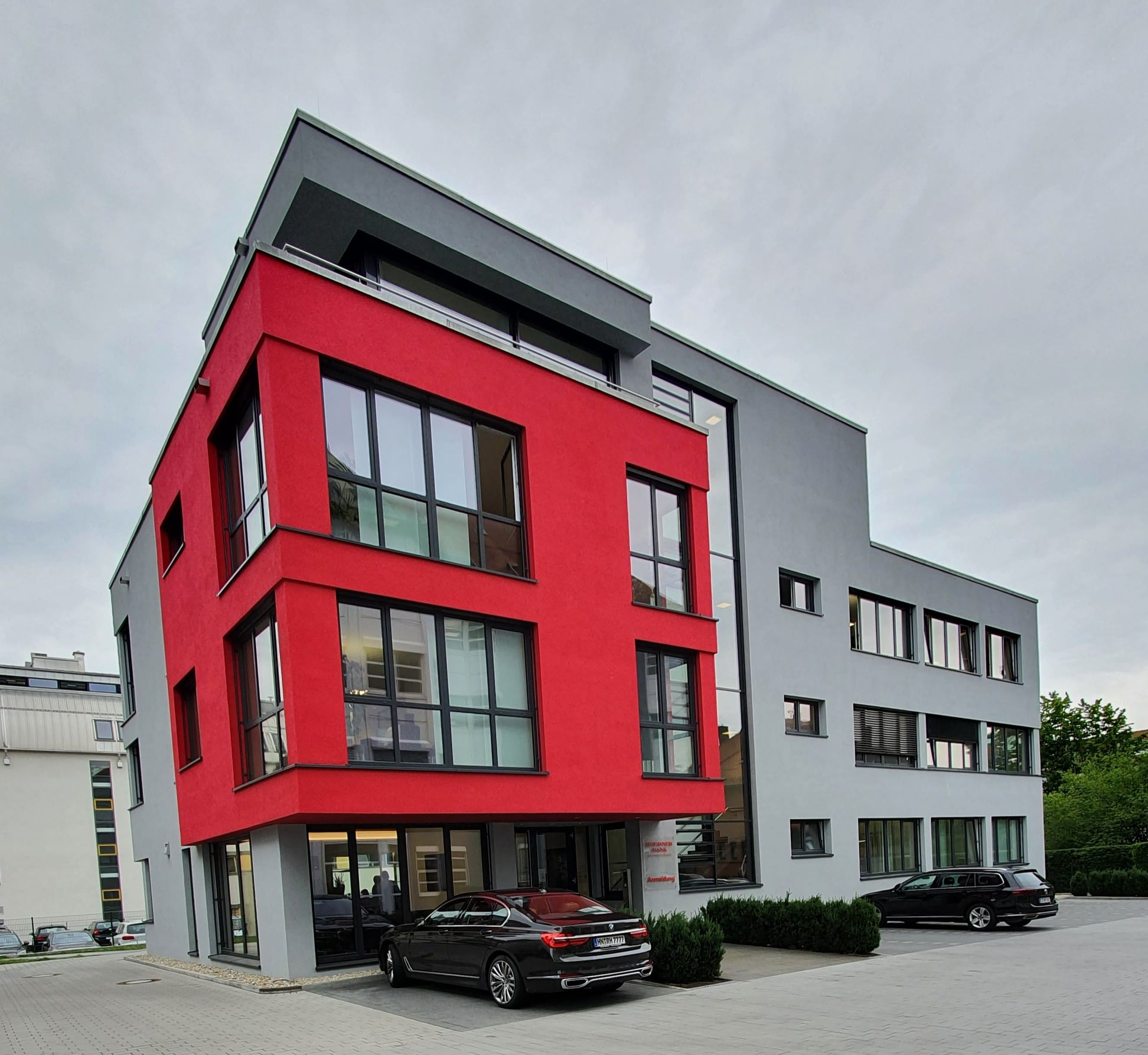

Hoerner Bank AG is a German private bank founded in 1849 and based in Heilbronn (Baden-Württemberg). In addition to asset management and private banking its specialty is the handling of international estate matters. In 2021, the bank was named one of the best asset managers in Germany by WirtschaftsWoche for the third time in a row.

== History ==
Founded in 1849 as an agency for emigrants to America, in 1903 it became the company Amerikanisches Bankgeschäft Eugen Hoerner & Carl Laiblin, which later became Eugen Hoerner GmbH Spezialbankgeschäft zur Erhebung von Erbschaften in Amerika and was entered in the commercial register in 1934. The bank changed its legal form from a limited liability company to a joint stock company in 1996.

== Company structure ==
Currently, Hoerner Bank AG has a total of 102 employees. The bank is a member of the Association of German Banks and the deposit insurance scheme of the private banking sector. In addition to its headquarters in Heilbronn, the company has representative offices in Berlin, Hamburg and Munich.

The company includes the subsidiaries Hoerner Immobilien GmbH and Hoerner Polska, based in Warsaw.

== Business areas ==
The range of services includes asset-investment and management as well as financial- and inheritance-planning, insurance, old-age pension and international probate research. Hoerner Bank is regionally represented on the market with its classic banking services (regional bank).

A distinctive feature is the settlement of international inheritance matters. Hoerner Bank AG is one of the largest and oldest inheritance mediators in Germany and is one of the three world market leaders in the processing of international inheritance matters. The divisions consist of 60 employees as well as a large number of additional international correspondents. These business areas are based on the agency for emigrants founded before 1849 and the special banking business for the recovery of American inheritances.

== See also ==
- List of banks in Germany
