= Simon Hirschland Bank =

Former bank in Essen, Germany

Coordinates: 51.4528°N 7.0114°E

Simon Hirschland Bank early 20th century on Lindenallee, Essen Germany

The Simon Hirschland Bank was founded in 1841 in Essen, Germany, by Simon Hirschland (1807-1885), who started his business as a merchant, and over the years began to lend money. The banking business began in 1841; Simon Hirschland also traded in wool, meat, pelts, nails, copper, lead and cattle, from 1 Weber Street. Simon Hirschland's son, Issac Hirschland (1845-1912), took over operation of the bank on his father’s death, and his sons, Dr. Georg Hirschland (1885-1942) and Kurt Hirschland (1882-1957) became the bank’s principles after Issac. The bank grew into an international investment bank, with concerns as far away as South America and the United States.

In 1938, the Simon Hirschland bank was forcibly sold ("Aryanized") and the family members who were involved in the bank fled to and settled in the United Kingdom, Canada, and the United States. Though the family members who arrived in the United States arrived with only their suitcases, the family has flourished, with many bankers, doctors, lawyers, and professionals in many fields.

The bank building still exists as a department store on Lindenalle, near the renamed Hirschlandplatz, in Essen.

One of the artworks looted from Kurt Hirschland by the Nazis, a drawing by Vincent Van Gogh called La Mousmé (July–August 1888) was restituted to the family by Amsterdam’s Stedelijk Museum in 1956.

== See also ==
- List of banks in Germany
