= List of banks in Germany =

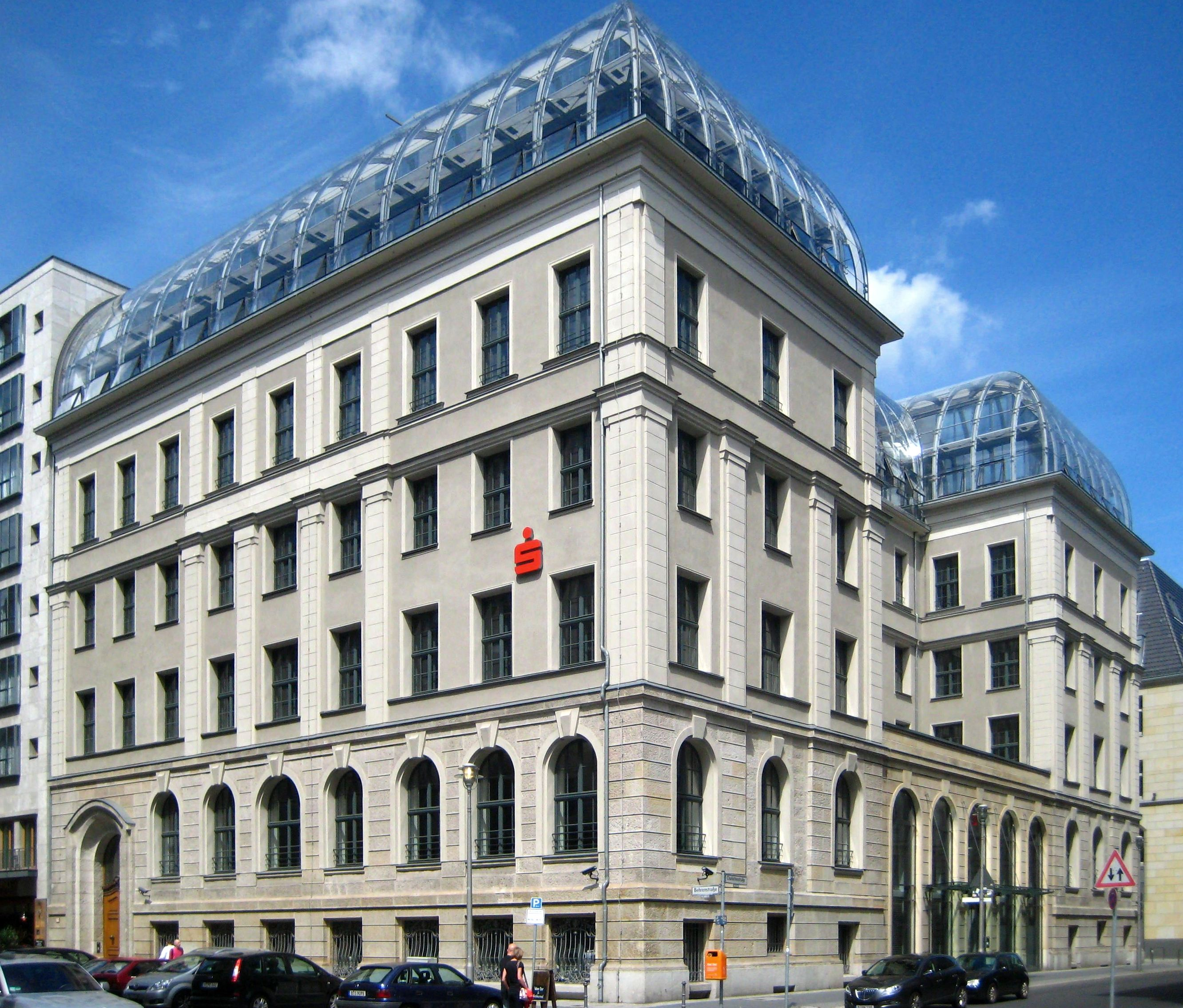
Berlin seat of DSGV, the central entity of the Sparkassen-Finanzgruppe

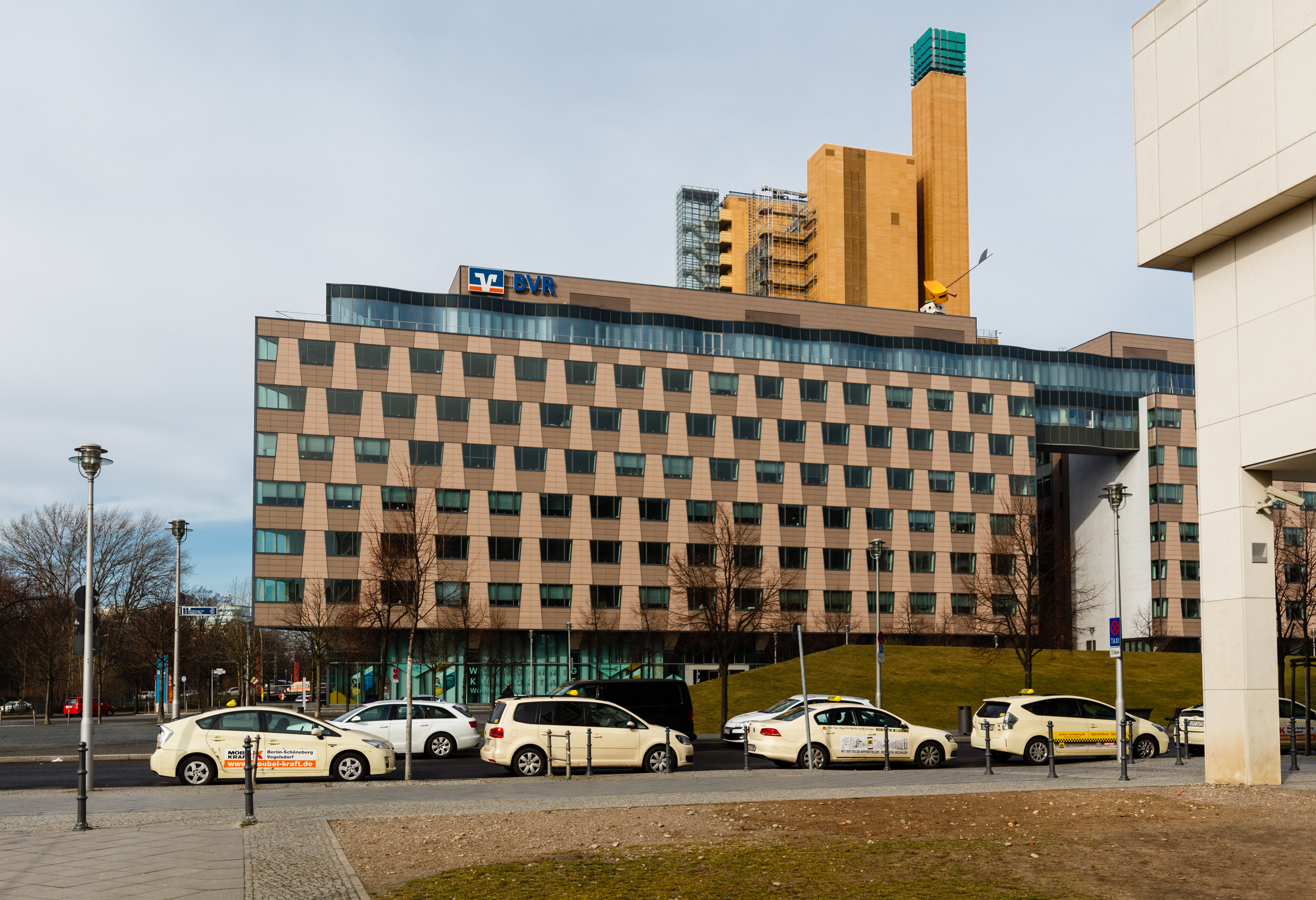
Berlin seat of BVR, the central entity of the German Cooperative Financial Group

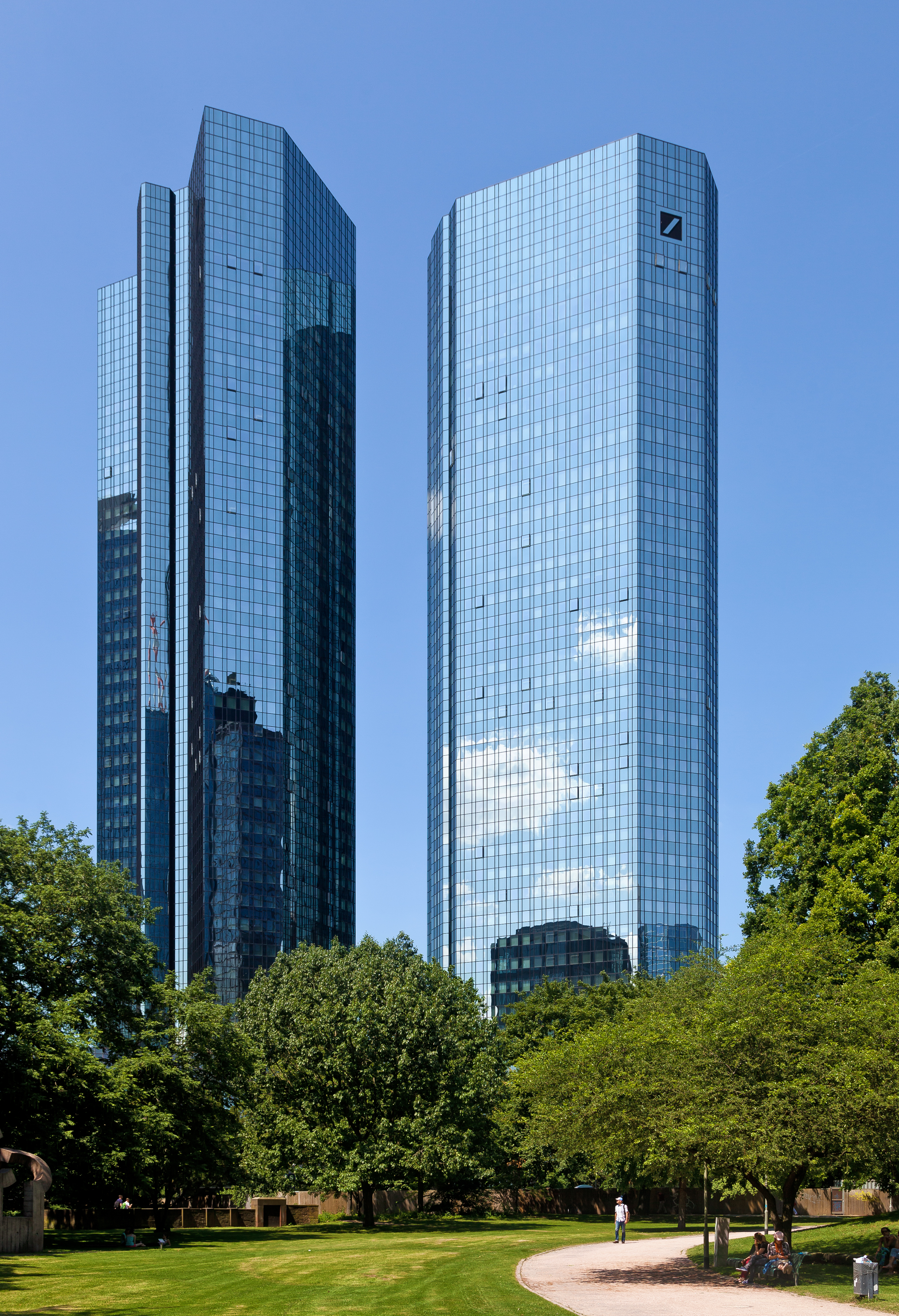
Deutsche Bank Twin Towers in Frankfurt, seat of Deutsche Bank

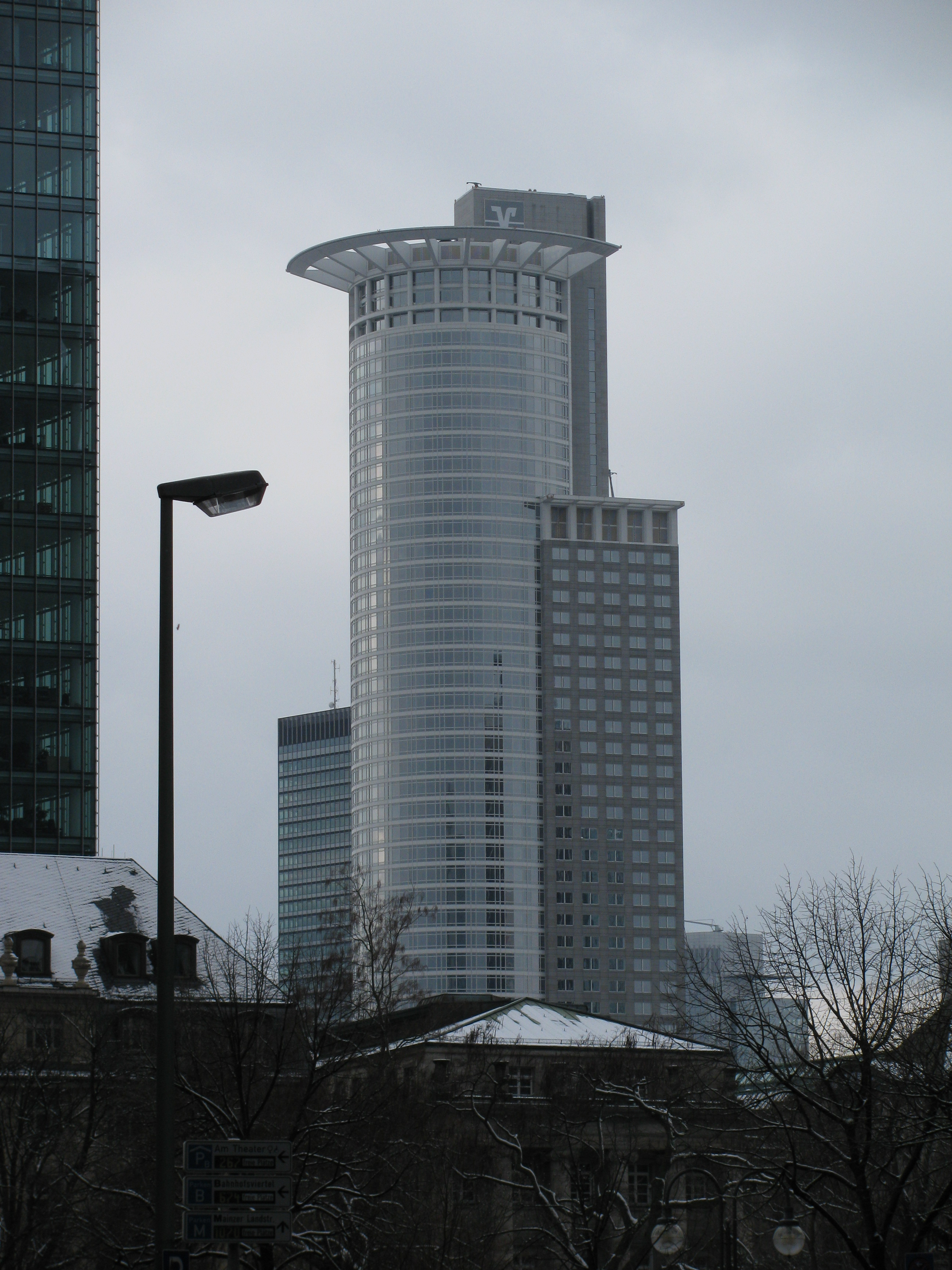
Westendstrasse 1 in Frankfurt, seat of DZ Bank

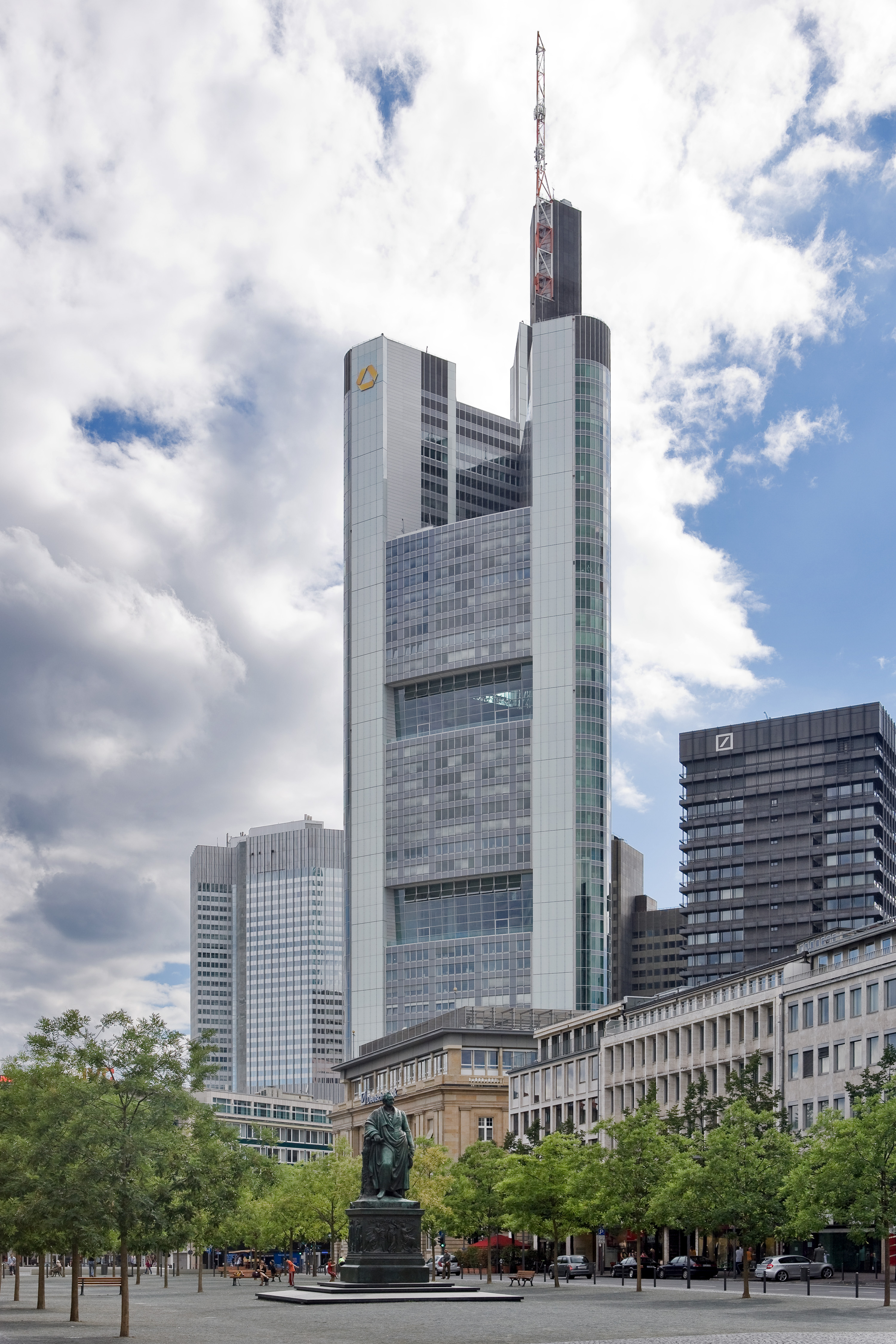
Commerzbank Tower in Frankfurt, seat of Commerzbank

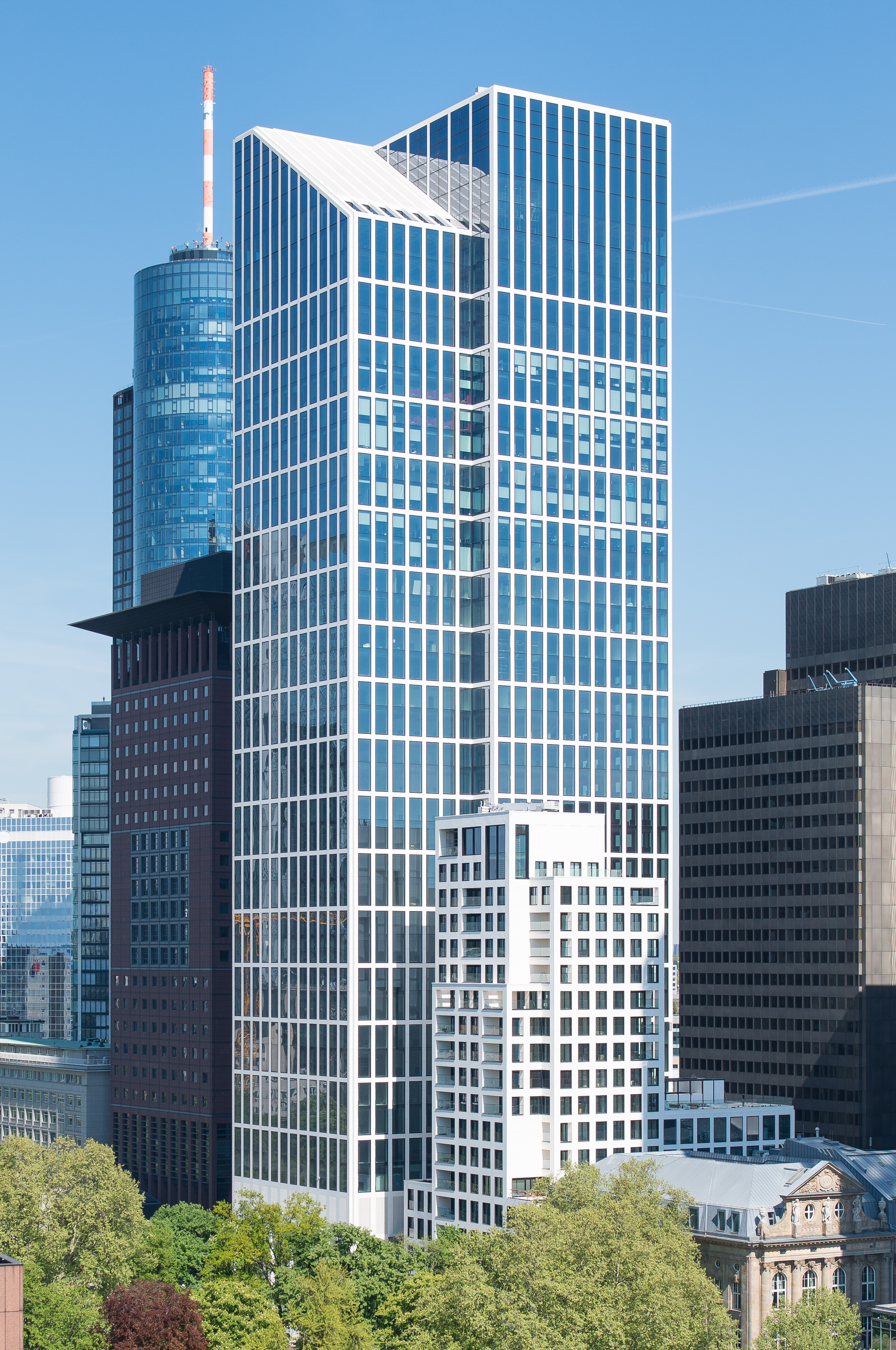
Taunusturm in Frankfurt, seat of J.P. Morgan SE

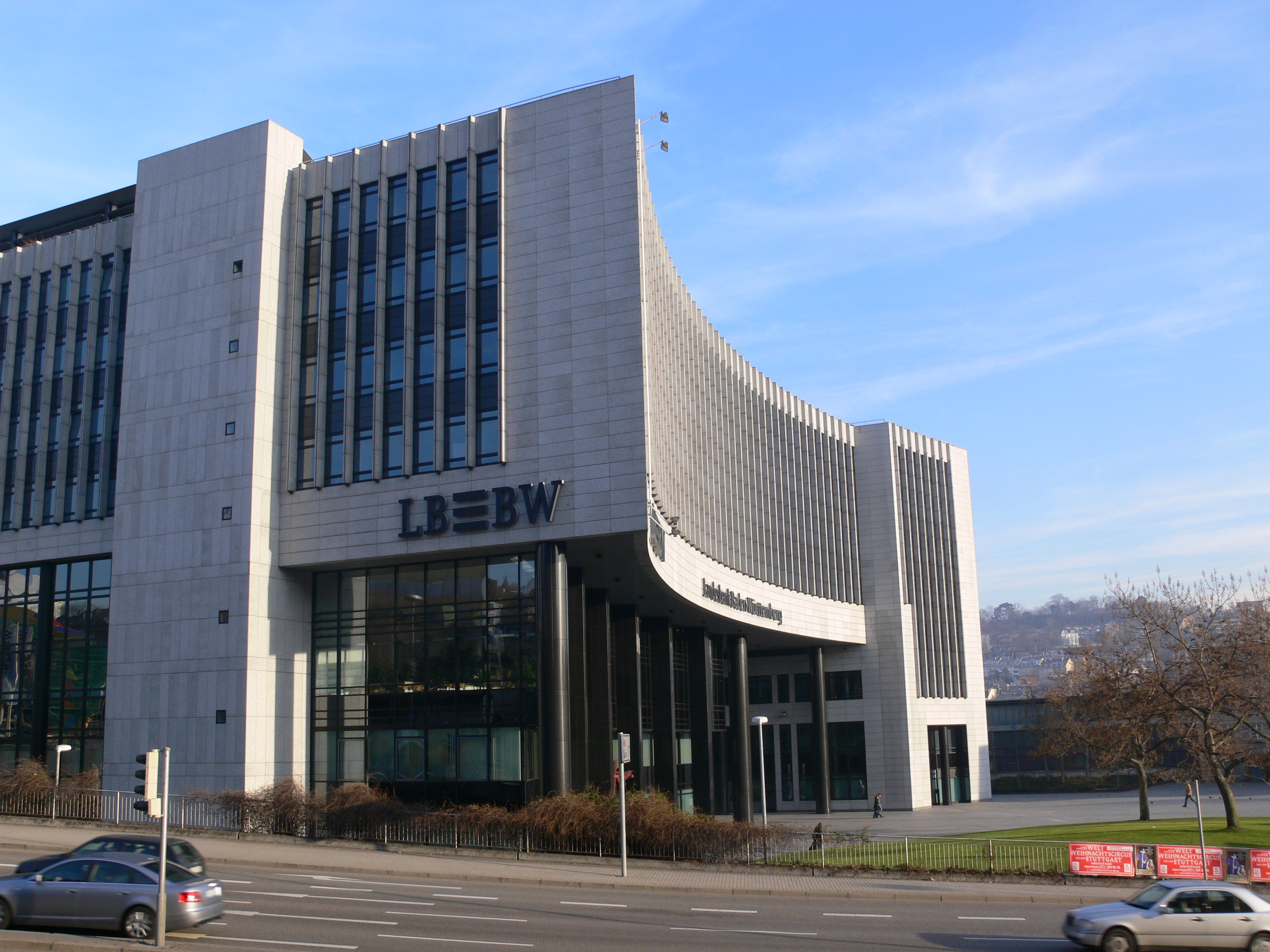
LBBW head office, Stuttgart

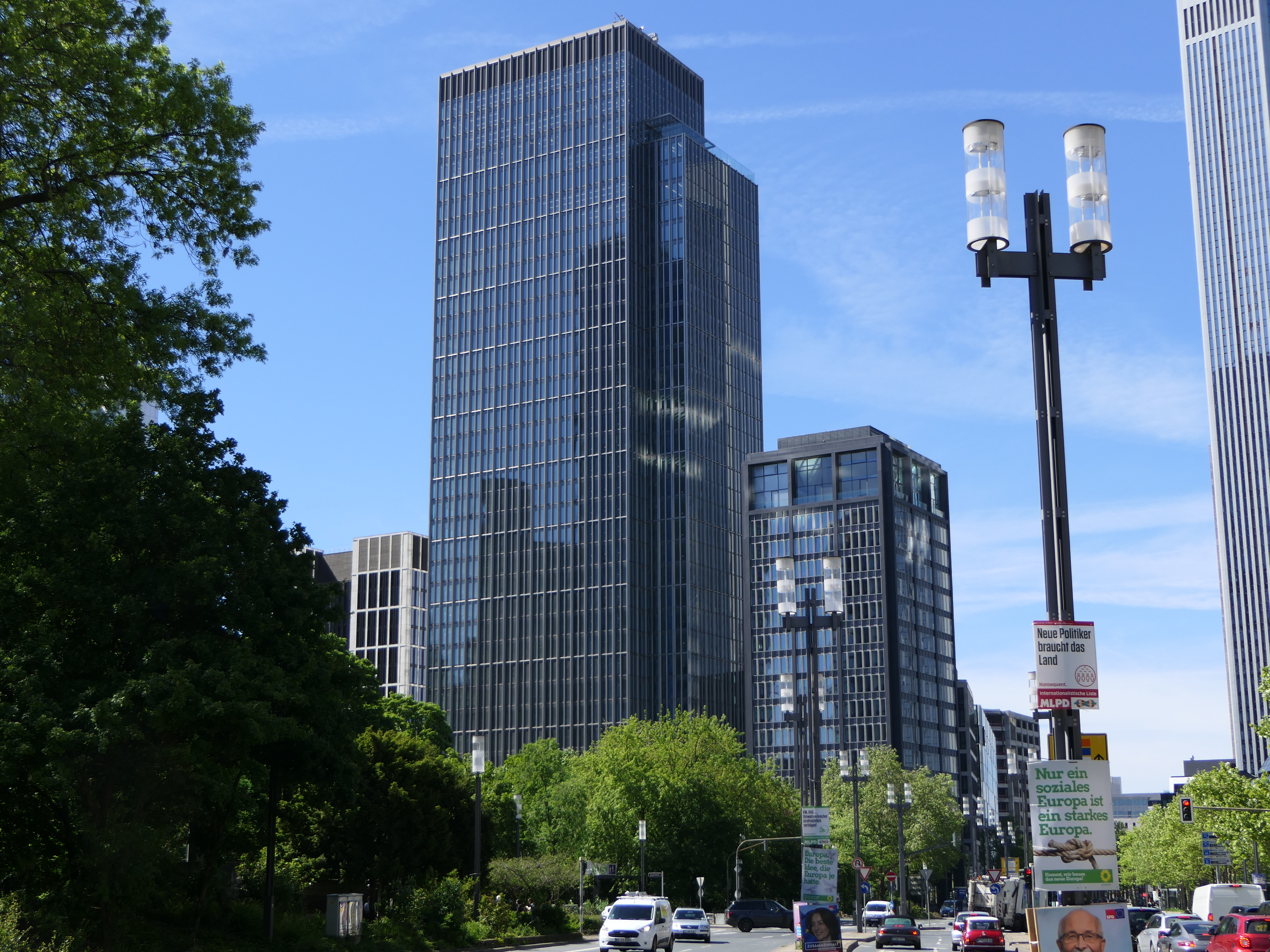
Marienturm in Frankfurt, seat of Goldman Sachs Bank Europe SE

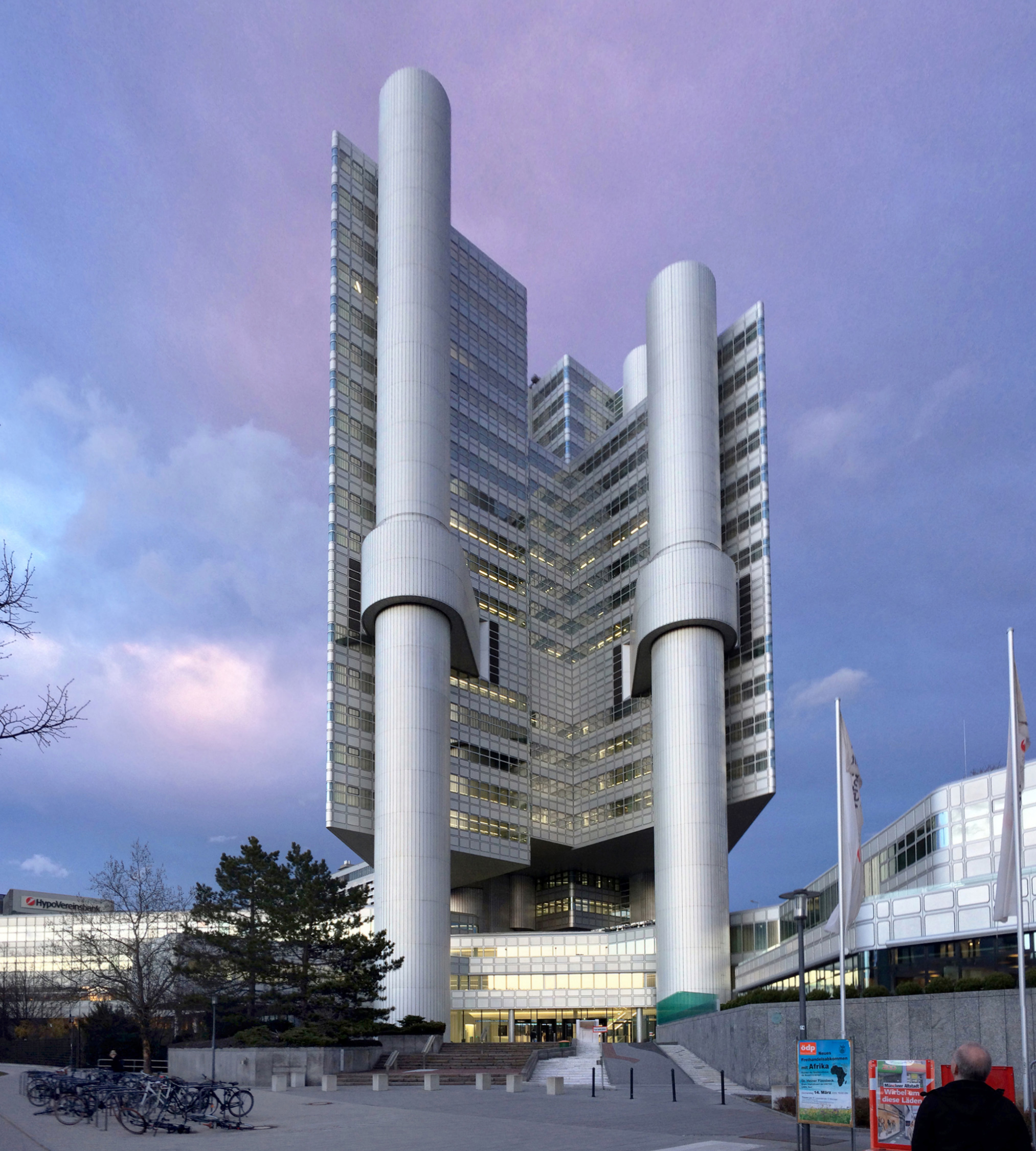
Hypo-Haus in Munich, seat of UniCredit Bank GmbH

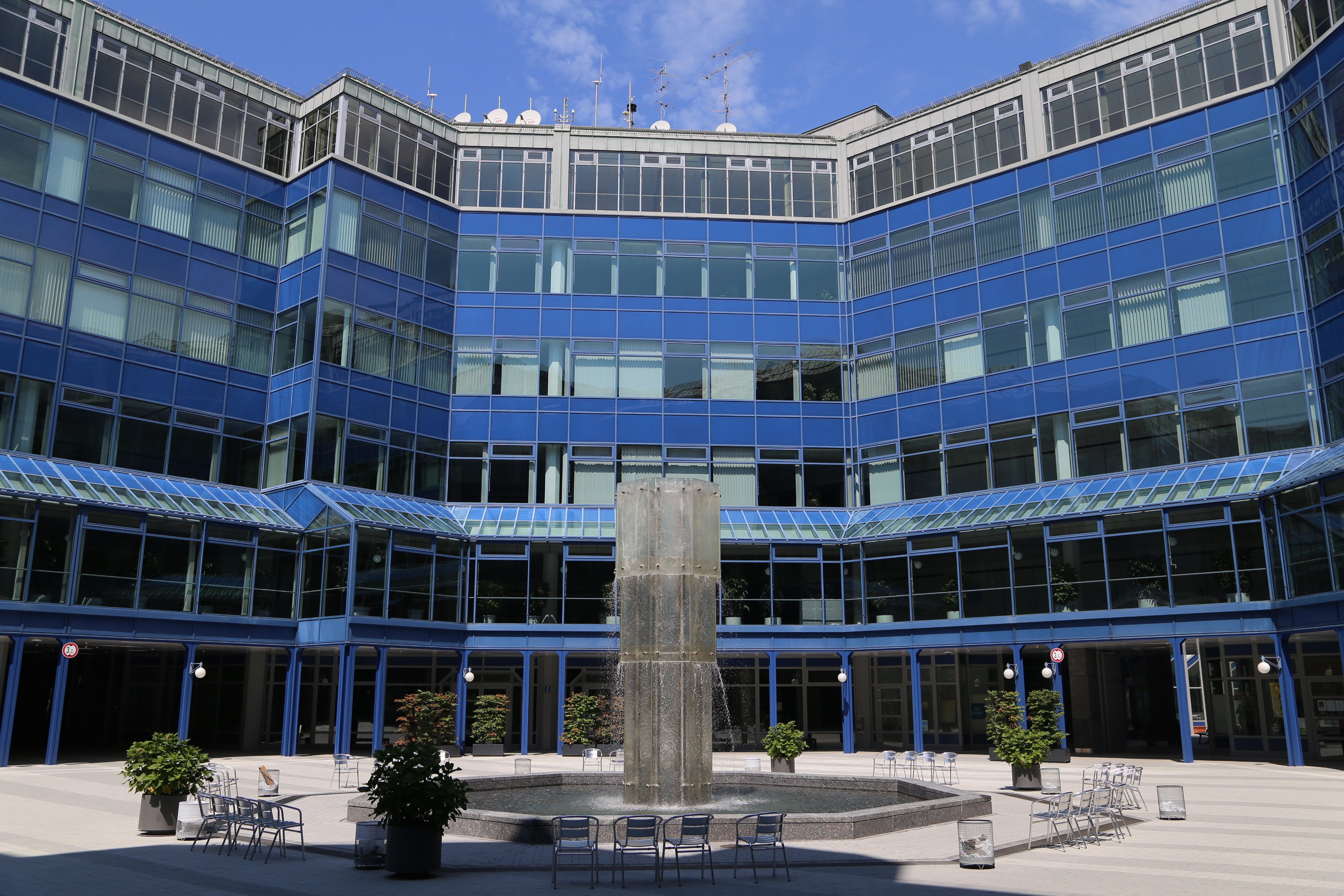
Bayerische Landesbank (BayernLB) head office, Munich

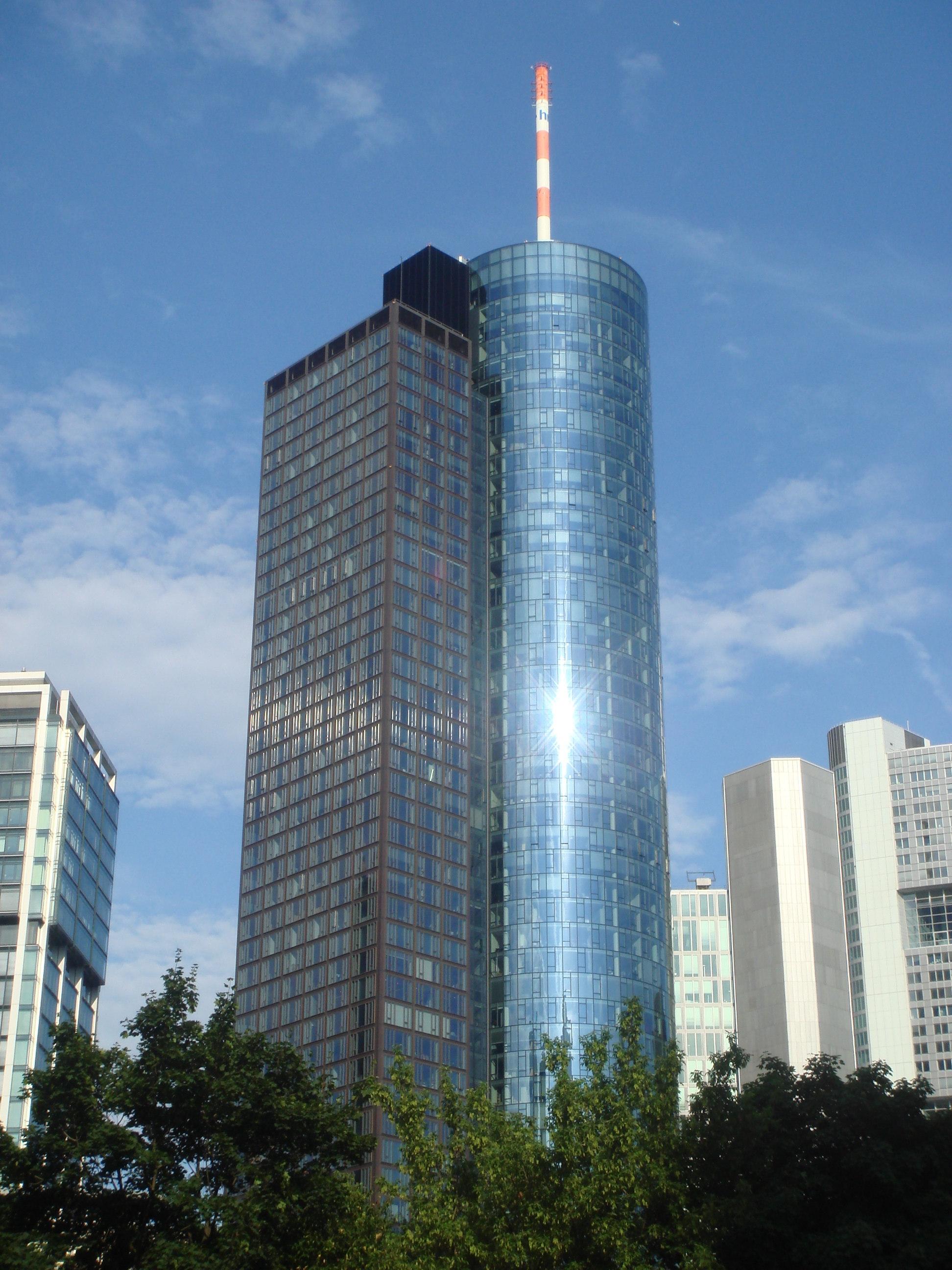
Main Tower in Frankfurt, seat of Landesbank Hessen-Thüringen Girozentrale (Helaba)

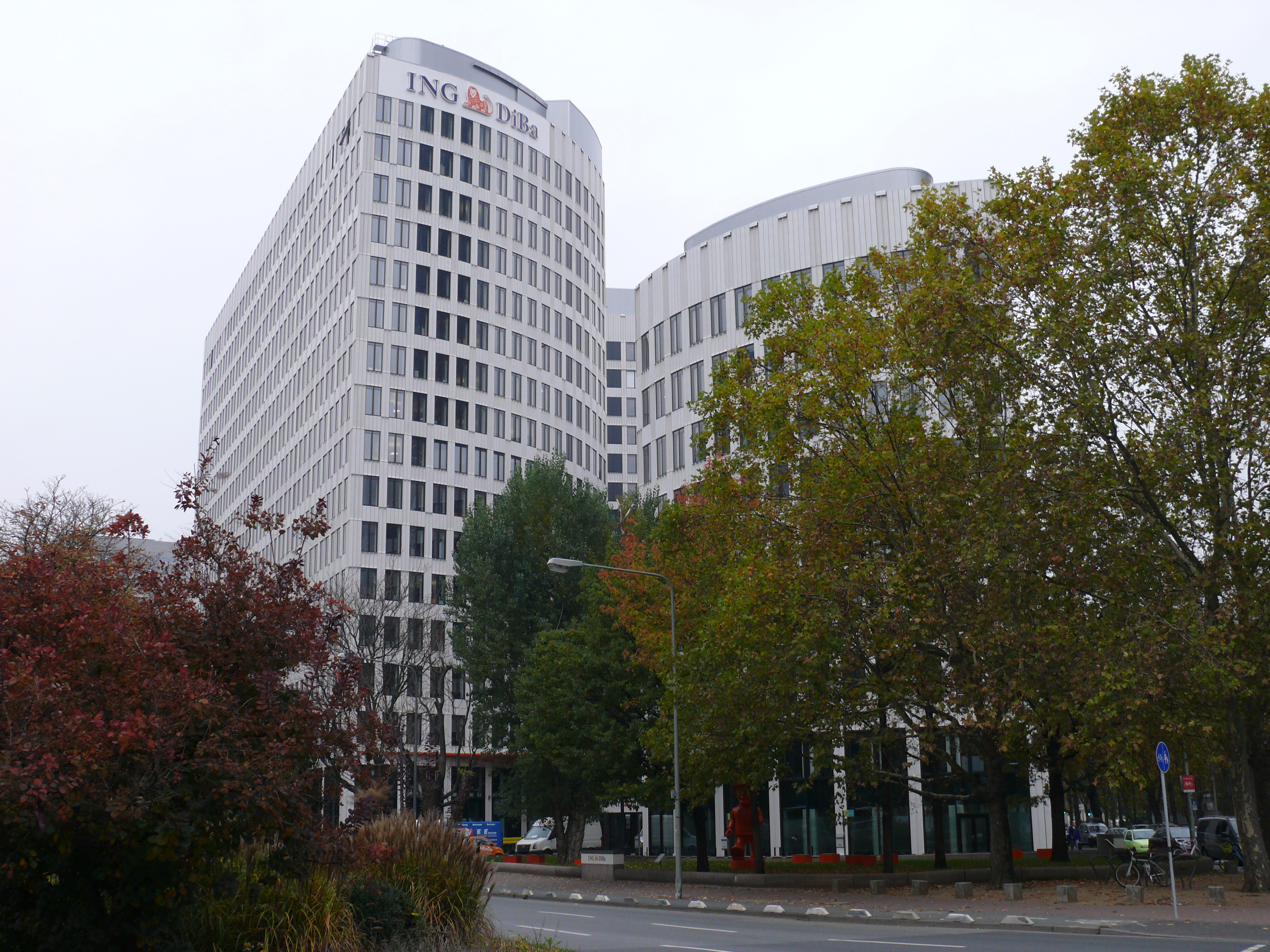
LEO building in Frankfurt, seat of ING DiBa

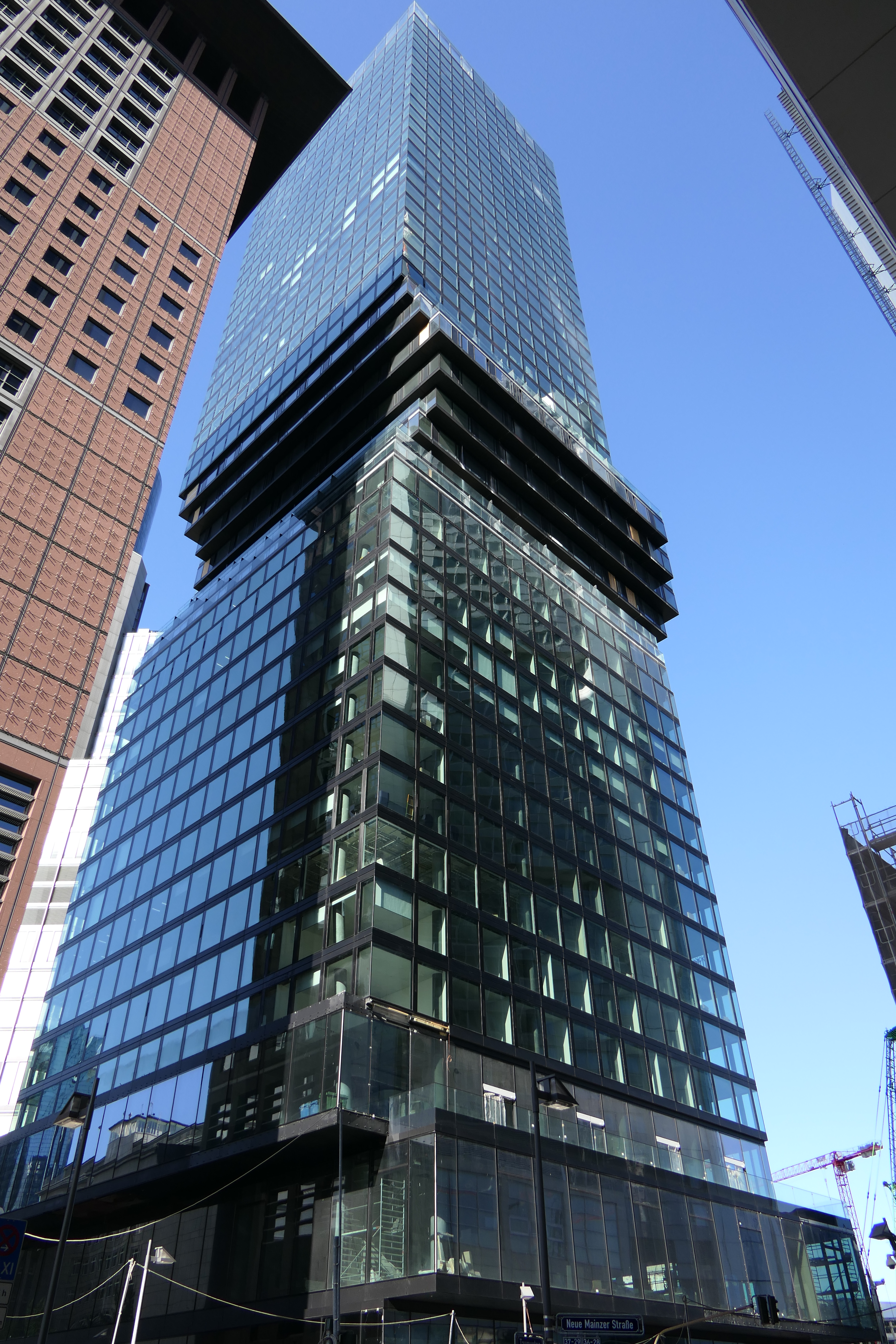
Omniturm in Frankfurt, seat of Morgan Stanley Europe Holding SE

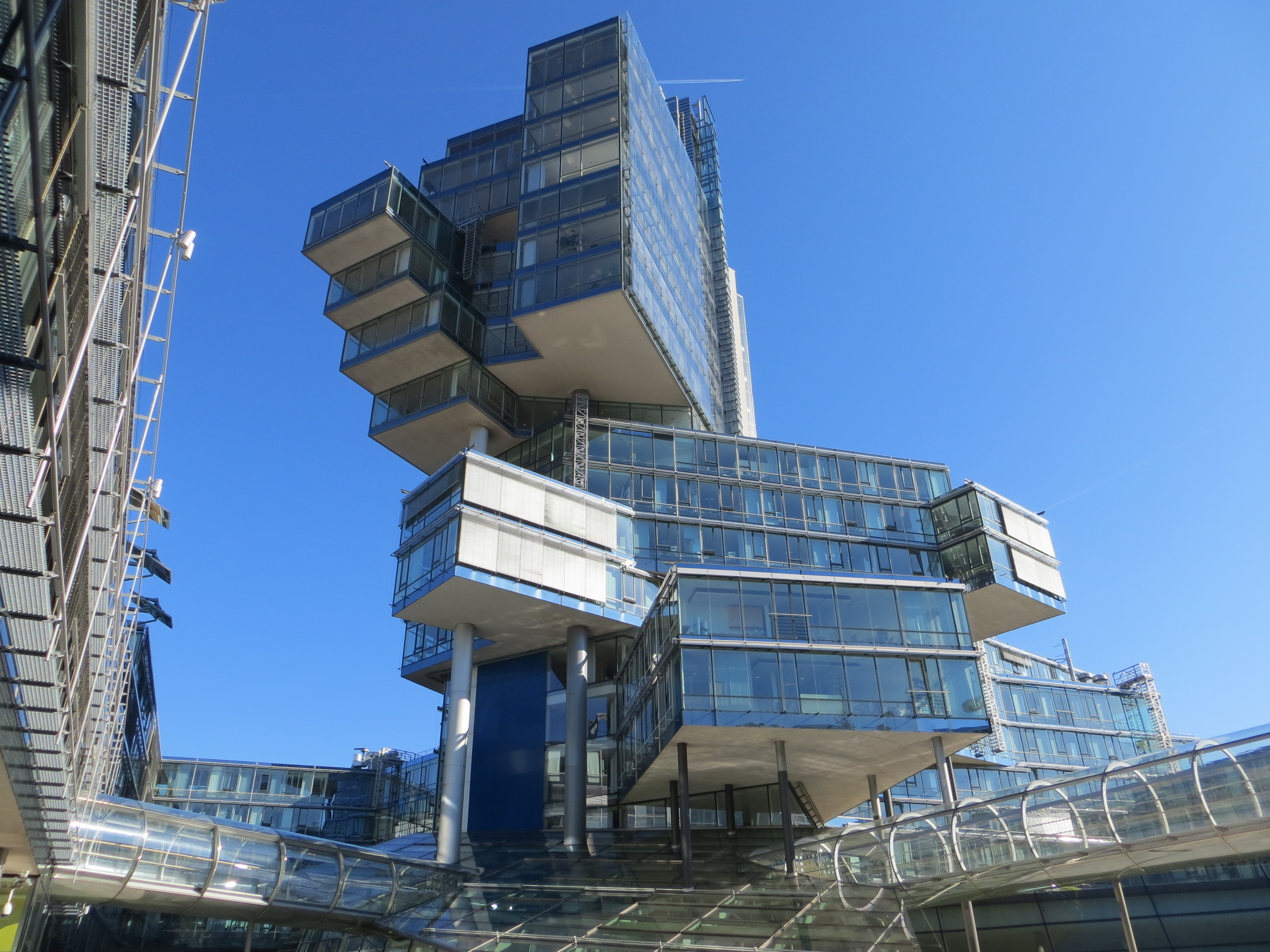
Norddeutsche Landesbank Girozentrale (NORD/LB) head office in Hannover

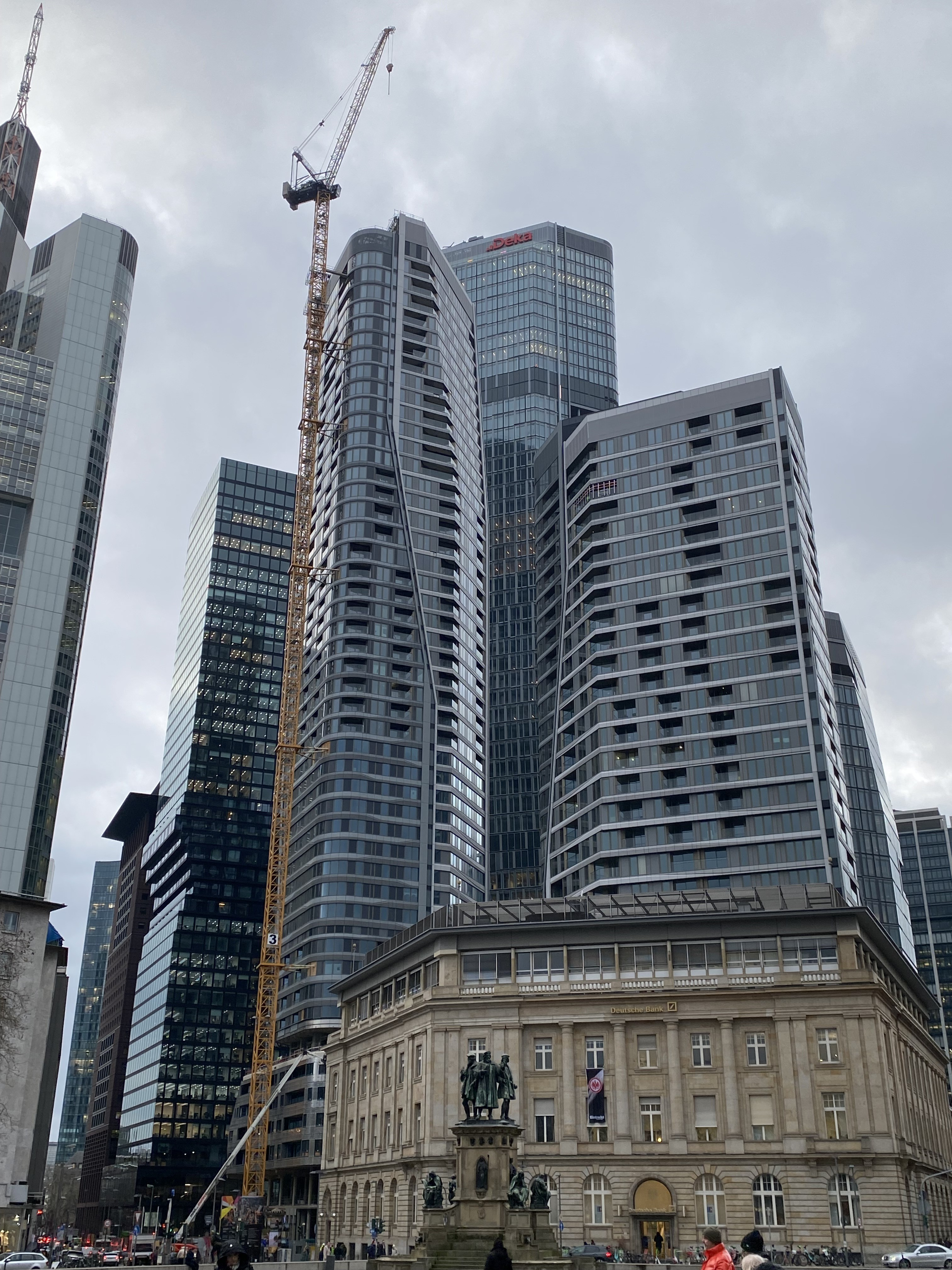
Große Gallusstraße 14 in Frankfurt, seat of DekaBank

The following list of banks in Germany is to be understood within the framework of the European single market and European banking union, which means that Germany's banking system is more open to cross-border banking operations than peers outside of the EU.

== Context ==
=== Historical background ===
Germany stands out for the uniquely extensive development of its public banking sector, whose origins can be traced back to the late 18th century and which acquired some of its current features with the development of savings banks (German: Sparkassen) during the 19th century. Germany was also where a cooperative banking sector flourished first under leaders such as Franz Hermann Schulze-Delitzsch and Friedrich Wilhelm Raiffeisen. Starting in the 1850s, joint-stock banks took momentum in various German states and developed rapidly into so-called Grossbanken, universal banks with connections with numerous industrial ventures forming loose conglomerates.

As a result, the banking sector in Germany has long been described of consisting of three "pillars", respectively public-sector banks, cooperative banks, and commercial banks - the latter including the Grossbanken and other joint-stock banks sometimes referred to as regional banks (Regionalbanken), as well as non-listed private banks (Privatbanken). These pillars are still represented by separate trade bodies — respectively the VÖB, BVR and BdB — and rely on separate deposit guarantee schemes unlike in most other EU countries where a single scheme covers all deposits.

=== Policy framework ===
European banking supervision distinguishes between significant institutions (SIs) and less significant institutions (LSIs), with SI/LSI designations updated regularly by the European Central Bank (ECB). Significant institutions are directly supervised by the ECB using joint supervisory teams that involve the national competent authorities (NCAs) of individual participating countries. Less significant institutions are supervised by the relevant NCA on a day-to-day basis, under the supervisory oversight of the ECB. In Germany's case, the NCA is the Federal Financial Supervisory Authority, known by the German shorthand BaFin.

The EU framework provides for the possibility of institutional protection scheme that bind together networks of local banks into idiosyncratic risk-sharing arrangements. Of the EU's eight IPSs as of 2022, two are in Germany, namely the Sparkassen-Finanzgruppe (SFG) and German Cooperative Financial Group. The latter corresponds exactly to the cooperative pillar of the German banking system, whereas the SFG is only a subgroup of the public-sector pillar which also includes public development banks (Förderbanken).

=== Recent developments ===
In recent years, the number of credit institutions in Germany has gradually declined, primarily due to consolidation among cooperative banks and savings banks. This trend has been driven by competitive pressures, regulatory requirements, and increasing investment needs in digital infrastructure.

As of 2026, Germany's banking sector comprises approximately 1,160–1,170 institutions, including both significant and less significant institutions under European Central Bank supervision. Total assets of the banking system are estimated at €9.8 trillion.

== Significant institutions ==
As of 1 September 2025, the ECB had the following 27 banking groups based in Germany in its list of significant institutions. 11 of the 27 belonged to the two German IPSs, and 7 were German affiliates of global banking groups headquartered outside of the EU:

- Atlantic Lux HoldCo Sàrl, Luxembourg holding entity of Aareal Bank
- Bayerische Landesbank (also known as BayernLB, SFG IPS)
- Citigroup Global Markets Europe AG, one of two intermediate parent undertakings of Citigroup in the EU
- Commerzbank AG
- DekaBank Deutsche Girozentrale (SFG IPS)
- Deutsche Apotheker- und Ärztebank eG (apoBank, cooperative IPS)
- Deutsche Kreditbank also known as DKB
- Deutsche Pfandbriefbank AG also known as PBB
- Deutsche Bank AG
- DZ BANK AG (cooperative IPS)
- Goldman Sachs Bank Europe SE, one of two intermediate parent undertakings of Goldman Sachs in the EU
- Hamburg Commercial Bank AG
- Landesbank Hessen-Thüringen Girozentrale (Helaba, SFG IPS)
- Haspa Finanzholding (SFG IPS)J.P. Morgan SE, one of two intermediate parent undertakings of JPMorgan Chase in the EU
- KfW Beteiligungsholding GmbH, subsidiary of KfW
- Landesbank Baden-Württemberg (LBBW, SFG IPS)
- Erwerbsgesellschaft der S-Finanzgruppe mbH & Co. KG (Landesbank Berlin, SFG IPS)
- LBS Landesbausparkasse Süd (SFG IPS)
- Morgan Stanley Europe Holding SE, intermediate parent undertaking of Morgan Stanley in the EU
- Münchener Hypothekenbank eG (cooperative IPS)
- NatWest Bank Europe GmbH, one of two intermediate parent undertakings of NatWest Group in the EU
- Norddeutsche Landesbank Girozentrale (NORD/LB, SFG IPS)
- Oldenburgische Landesbank AG, acquired since then by Crédit Mutuel Alliance Fédérale
- State Street Europe Holdings Germany Sàrl & Co. KG, subsidiary of State Street
- UBS Europe SE, subsidiary of UBS
- Volkswagen Financial Services AG, subsidiary of Volkswagen
- Wüstenrot Bausparkasse, subsidiary of Wüstenrot & Württembergische

A study published in 2024 assessed that the largest bank by assets in Germany (as opposed to total consolidated assets) at end-2023 was Deutsche Bank (€1.1 trillion, including Postbank and Norisbank) followed by DZ Bank (€619 bn), Commerzbank (€460 bn), J.P. Morgan (€421 bn), LBBW (€333 bn), Goldman Sachs (€291 bn), UniCredit (€283 bn), BayernLB (€273 bn), Helaba (€202 bn), ING (€169 bn), Morgan Stanley (€107 bn), NORD/LB (€104 bn), and DekaBank (€85 bn). Deutsche Bank has been consistently designated as Global systemically important bank (G-SIB) by the Financial Stability Board, including in the update of November 2025.

This ranking includes euro area banks based outside Germany that operate in Germany via subsidiaries, such as UniCredit via HypoVereinsbank and ING via ING DiBa. Other cases are Santander via Santander Consumer Bank Germany, Crédit Mutuel via Targobank, as well as ABN AMRO, BPCE, Crédit Agricole, and Société Générale. The ranking, however, does not feature banking groups that operate in Germany through branches and do not disclose the corresponding national branch assets, such as BNP Paribas whose branch operates its German brands Consorsbank and DAB BNP Paribas, or HSBC which operates in Germany through Paris-based HSBC Continental Europe. The ranking also does not take into account consolidated figures for the two German IPSs: also at end-2023, the Sparkassen-Finanzgruppe disclosed combined total German assets of €2.5 trillion, and the Cooperative Financial Group disclosed consolidated assets of €1.6 trillion. Considered as banking groups, the SFG and Cooperative Financial Group therefore qualify as the two largest in Germany.

== Less significant institutions ==
As of 1 September 2025, the ECB's list of supervised institutions included 1,145 German LSIs out of 2,062 in the euro area, or 55.6 percent of the euro-area total.

=== High-impact LSIs ===
Of these, 27 were designated by the ECB as "high-impact" on the basis of several criteria including size, including 4 in the cooperative IPSs and 12 in the Sparkassen-Finanzgruppe IPS:

- BBBank eG (cooperative IPS)
- Berliner Volksbank eG (cooperative IPS)
- BMW Bank GmbH, subsidiary of BMW
- Clearstream Holding AG, subsidiary of Deutsche Börse
- Deutsche WertpapierService Bank AG, a joint venture of the SFG and Cooperative Group
- Eurex Clearing AG, another subsidiary of Deutsche Börse
- Frankfurter Volksbank Rhein/Main eG (cooperative IPS)
- IKB Deutsche Industriebank AG, owned by Lone Star Funds
- Kreissparkasse Köln (SFG IPS)
- Landesbank Saar (SFG IPS)
- LBS Landesbausparkasse NordWest (SFG IPS)
- Lloyds Bank GmbH, subsidiary of Lloyds Bank
- Mercedes-Benz Bank AG, subsidiary of Mercedes-Benz Group
- Mittelbrandenburgische Sparkasse in Potsdam (SFG IPS)
- Nassauische Sparkasse (SFG IPS)
- Bank Pictet & Cie (Europe) AG, subsidiary of Pictet Group
- ProCredit Holding AG & Co. KGaA (see also ProCredit Bank below)
- Sachsen-Finanzgruppe (financial holding in the SFG IPS)
- SMBC Bank EU AG, intermediate parent undertaking of SMBC Group in the EU
- Sparda-Bank Baden-Württemberg eG (cooperative IPS)
- Finanzholding der Sparkasse Bremen (financial holding in the SFG IPS)
- Sparkasse Hannover (SFG IPS)
- Sparkasse KölnBonn (SFG IPS)
- Sparkasse Pforzheim Calw (SFG IPS)
- Stadtsparkasse Düsseldorf (SFG IPS)
- Stadtsparkasse München (SFG IPS)
- Toyota Kreditbank GmbH, subsidiary of Toyota

Of the above, Eurex Clearing AG meets the criteria for SI designation, but has been classified by the ECB as a LSI by special derogation together with a handful of other financial market infrastructures.

=== Sparkassen-Finanzgruppe ===
In addition to the above-listed 8 SIs and 12 high-impact LSIs, the ECB list included 336 LSIs (334 credit institutions and 2 financial holding companies) that were members of the Sparkassen-Finanzgruppe IPS. Among these, the following ones are specifically documented on Wikipedia in English:

- Kreissparkasse Ludwigsburg
- Ostsächsische Sparkasse Dresden
- Sparkasse an Volme und Ruhr
- Sparkasse Mittelholstein AG
- Stadt- und Kreissparkasse Leipzig

=== Cooperative Financial Group ===
In addition to the above-listed 3 SIs and 4 high-impact LSIs, the ECB list also included 653 entities (652 credit institutions and one financial holding company) that were members of the German Cooperative Financial Group IPS. Among these, the following ones are specifically documented on Wikipedia in English:

- Bank im Bistum Essen eG
- Edekabank AG
- GLS Gemeinschaftsbank eG
- Bank für Kirche und Diakonie eG - KD-Bank
- Pax-Bank für Kirche und Caritas eG
- PSD group of banks
- VBU Volksbank im Unterland eG
- Volksbank in Ostwestfalen eG
- Volksbank Neckartal eG
- Volksbank Stuttgart eG

=== Other domestic German LSIs ===
The 95 other domestic German LSIs are listed below, based on the ECB list of supervised entities as of 1 September 2025.

- ABC Holding GmbH
  - abcbank GmbH
- Airbus Bank GmbH, subsidiary of Airbus
- AKA Ausfuhrkredit-GmbH
- akf bank GmbH & Co KG
- Alte Leipziger Bauspar AG, subsidiary of Alte Leipziger – Hallesche
- B. Metzler seel. Sohn & Co. AG
- Baader Verwaltungs GmbH, holding entity of Baader Bank
  - Baader Beteiligungs GmbH, intermediate holding entity
  - Baader Bank AG
- Bank 11 Holding GmbH, parent entity of Bank11
  - Bank11 für Privatkunden und Handel GmbH
- Bankhaus Anton Hafner KG
- BB Beteiligungs GmbH, holding entity of Bankhaus Bauer
  - Bankhaus Bauer AG
- Bankhaus C. L. Seeliger
- Bankhaus E. Mayer AG
- Bankhaus Ellwanger & Geiger AG
- Bankhaus Gebr. Martin AG
- Bankhaus Herzogpark AG
- Bankhaus Ludwig Sperrer KG
- Bankhaus Max Flessa KG
- Bankhaus Obotritia GmbH
- Bankhaus Rautenschlein AG
- Bankhaus Werhahn GmbH
- Bausparkasse Mainz AG
- BfW - Bank für Wohnungswirtschaft AG
- C24 Bank GmbH, subsidiary of Check24
- Calenberger Kreditverein (Calenberg-Göttingen- Grubenhagen- Hildesheim'scher ritterschaftlicher Kreditverein), a public-sector credit institution
- CB Bank GmbH
- Clearstream Banking AG, subsidiary of Deutsche Börse
- Cronbank AG
- CVW-Privatbank AG
- Deutsche Bausparkasse Badenia AG, subsidiary of Generali
- Deutsche Haftungsdach GmbH
- Donner & Reuschel AG
- DZB Bank GmbH, part of the ANWR Cooperative Group
  - Aktivbank AG, fully-owned subsidiary of DZB
- ETRIS Bank GmbH, subsidiary of E/D/E
- Global Heart Beteiligungsgesellschaft mbH, holding entity of FIB
  - FIB Frankfurt International Bank AG
- flatexDEGIRO AG, holding entity of flatexDEGIRO Bank
  - flatex Finanz GmbH, intermediate holding
  - flatexDEGIRO Bank AG
- FNZ Bank SE
- Fürst Fugger Privatbank AG
- Fürstlich Castell'sche Bank Credit-Casse AG
- Gabler-Saliter Bankgeschäft AG
- Goyer & Göppel KG
- Grenke AG
  - Grenke Bank AG
- GSCF Working Capital Bank GmbH
- Hoerner-Bank AG
- Würth Finanz-Beteiligungs-GmbH, majority-owner of IBB
  - Internationales Bankhaus Bodensee AG
- Joh. Berenberg, Gossler & Co. KG, also known as Berenberg Bank
- M.M. Warburg & Co Gruppe GmbH, holding entity
  - M. M. Warburg & Co (AG & Co) KGaA
- Marcard, Stein & Co AG
- Max Heinr. Sutor oHG
- mediserv Bank GmbH
- Merkur Bank KGaA
- MKB Mittelstandskreditbank AG
- MLP SE
  - MLP Banking AG, subsidiary of MLP SE
- N26 AG
  - N26 Bank AG
- National-Bank AG
- BHF Group SA, Belgian entity of the Oddo BHF Group
  - ODDO BHF AG, subsidiary of BHF Group SA
- Otto M. Schröder Bank AG
- PEAC Holdings (Germany) GmbH & Co KG, leasing group owned by HPS Investment Partners
  - PEAC (Germany) GmbH, subsidiary of PEAC Holdings
- ProCredit Bank AG, subsidiary of ProCredit Holding
- Berliner Effektengesellschaft AG, holding entity of Quirin Privatbank
  - Quirin Privatbank AG
- Raisin Bank AG
- RSB Retail + Service Bank GmbH
- Siemens Bank GmbH, subsidiary of Siemens Financial Services
- Signal Iduna Bauspar AG, subsidiary of Signal Iduna Group
- Solaris SE
- BFS SozialFinanz AG, holding entity of SozialBank
  - SozialBank AG
- Sparkasse zu Lübeck AG
- Steyler Bank GmbH
- Süd-West-Kreditbank Finanzierung GmbH (SWK Bank)
- TEN31 Bank AG
- Trade Republic Bank GmbH
- Tradegate AG, owner of Tradegate Exchange
- Trumpf Financial Services GmbH, subsidiary of Trumpf
- Umweltbank AG
- Union-Bank AG
- Varengold Bank AG
- FS E&G Holding GmbH, owner of V-Bank
  - V-Bank AG

=== Non-euro-area-controlled LSIs ===
Based on the same ECB list, the following 35 LSIs were controlled by financial groups based outside the euro area. They include 22 subsidiaries, and 13 branches of banks based in the European Economic Area (EEA) but outside of the euro area.

- (Turkey) Akbank AG, subsidiary of Akbank
- (Switzerland) Bank Julius Bär Deutschland AG, subsidiary of Julius Baer Group
- (Switzerland) Bank Vontobel Europe AG, subsidiary of Vontobel
- (Norway) German branch of DNB Bank ASA
- (Iran) Europäisch-Iranische Handelsbank AG, majority-owned by Bank of Industry and Mine
- (United States) FIL Holdings Germany GmbH, subsidiary of Fidelity International
  - FIL Fondsbank GmbH, owned by FIL Holdings Germany
- (United States) Ford Bank GmbH, subsidiary of Ford Motor Company
- (Sweden) German branch of Hoist Finance AB
- (Japan) Honda Bank GmbH, subsidiary of Honda
- (Sweden) German branch of Ikano Bank AB
- Isbank AG, subsidiary of İşbank
- (Czech Republic) German branch of J&T Banka as
- (Denmark) German branch of Jyske Bank A/S
- (Korea) KEB Hana Bank (D) Aktiengesellschaft, subsidiary of Hana Bank
- (Sweden) German branch of Klarna Bank AB
- KT Bank AG, subsidiary of Kuwait Finance House via Kuveyt Turk Participation Bank
- (Liechtenstein) German branch of LGT Bank AG
- (Liechtenstein) German branch of Liechtensteinische Landesbank AG
- (Egypt) Misr Bank - Europe GmbH, subsidiary of Banque Misr
- (Hungary) German branch of OTP Bank Nyrt
- (Turkey) Oyak Anker Bank GmbH, subsidiary of OYAK
- (Poland) German branch of PKO Bank Polski SA
- (Switzerland) SECB Swiss Euro Clearing Bank GmbH, subsidiary of SIX Group
- (Korea) Shinhan Bank Europe GmbH, subsidiary of Shinhan Bank
- (Sweden) German branch of Skandinaviska Enskilda Banken AB
- (Switzerland) St.Galler Kantonalbank Deutschland AG, subsidiary of St.Galler Kantonalbank
- (United Kingdom) Standard Chartered Bank AG, subsidiary of Standard Chartered
- (Denmark) German branch of Sydbank A/S
- (Sweden) German branch of Toyota Material Handling Commercial Finance AB, Swedish subsidiary of Toyota
- (Switzerland) VZ VermögensZentrum Bank AG, subsidiary of VZ Holding
- (Australia) Westpac Europe GmbH, subsidiary of Westpac
- (Korea) Woori Bank Europe GmbH, subsidiary of Woori Bank
- (Turkey) Yapi Kredi Bank Deutschland GmbH & Co oHG, subsidiary of Yapı Kredi
- (Turkey) Ziraat Bank International AG, subsidiary of Ziraat Bank

== Third-country branches ==
As of 13 October 2025, the following banking groups established outside the EEA had branches in Germany ("third-country branches" in EU parlance):

- Agricultural Bank of China
- (Australia) ANZ Bank Holding
- (Brazil) Banco do Brasil
- Bank Melli Iran
- Bank of China
- (China) Bank of Communications
- Bank Saderat Iran
- (Iran) Bank Sepah
- (United States) Bank of New York
- China Construction Bank
- (Taiwan) First Commercial Holding
- (United States) Goldman Sachs
- (India) ICICI Bank
- Industrial and Commercial Bank of China
- Korea Development Bank
- (Iran) Khavarmianeh (Middle East) Bank
- (United Kingdom) Lloyds Banking Group
- (Japan) Mizuho Financial Group
- National Bank of Pakistan
- (United Kingdom) NatWest Markets
- (United Kingdom) National Westminster Bank
- (Iran) Saman Bank
- State Bank of India
- State Bank of Vietnam
- (Japan) Sumitomo Mitsui Financial Group

== Public credit institutions ==
The following European, national and sub-national public public credit institutions are based in Germany but do not hold a banking license under EU law (Capital Requirements Directives) and are therefore outside the remit of European banking supervision:

=== European level ===
- European Central Bank in Frankfurt, an EU institution

=== Federal level ===
- Deutsche Bundesbank in Frankfurt, Germany's national central bank
- Kreditanstalt für Wiederaufbau in Frankfurt
- Landwirtschaftliche Rentenbank in Frankfurt

=== State level ===
- Investitionsbank Schleswig-Holstein (IB.SH) in Kiel
- Landesförderinstitut Mecklenburg-Vorpommern (LFI-MV) in Schwerin
- Hamburgische Investitions- und Förderbank (IFB Hamburg)
- (Bremen (state)) Bremer Aufbau-Bank (BAB) in Bremen
- Investitionsbank Berlin (IBB) in Berlin
- Investitionsbank des Landes Brandenburg (ILB) in Berlin
- (Lower Saxony) Investitions- und Förderbank Niedersachsen (NBank) in Hanover
- (Saxony-Anhalt) Investitionsbank Sachsen-Anhalt (IB) in Magdeburg
- (Saxony) Sächsische Aufbaubank (SAB) in Leipzig
- (North Rhine-Westphalia) NRW.Bank in Düsseldorf and Münster
- (Thuringia) Thüringer Aufbaubank in Erfurt
- (Hesse) Wirtschafts- und Infrastrukturbank Hessen (WI-Bank) in Offenbach am Main
- (Rhineland-Palatinate) Investitions- und Strukturbank Rheinland-Pfalz (ISB) in Mainz
- (Saarland) Saarländische Investitionskreditbank (SIKB) in Saarbrücken
- Landeskreditbank Baden-Württemberg – Förderbank (L-Bank) in Karlsruhe
- (Bavaria) LfA Förderbank Bayern in Munich

== Defunct banks ==
Selected former German banks are listed below in chronological order of establishment, divided into three categories.

=== Former central banks & banks of issue ===
The Hamburger Bank had attributes of a central bank despite not issuing its own paper money. In the 19th century, Germany's political fragmentation led to the establishment of numerous banks of issue until monetary unification in the 1870s. Even after that, multiple banks kept their issuance privilege until the Reichsbank eventually acquired a monopoly in 1935.

- Hamburger Bank (1619-1875)
- Preußische Bank (1766-1876)
- Lübecker Privatbank (1820-1927), bank of issue 1856-1875
- Bayerische Hypotheken- und Wechsel-Bank (1834-1998), bank of issue until 1874
- Leipziger Bank (1838-1901), bank of issue 1839-1875
- Bank für Süddeutschland (1846-1902)
- Anhalt-Dessauische Landesbank (1846-1945), bank of issue 1847-1875
- Darlehnskassen, intermittent issuing institutions (1848-1924)
- Chemnitzer Stadtbank (1848-1914), bank of issue until end-1890
- Homburger Bank (1849-1929), bank of issue 1855-1876
- Bank des Berliner Kassenvereins (1850-1942), bank of issue until 1876
- Rostocker Bank (1850-2016), bank of issue until 1877
- Braunschweigische Bank (1852-1929), bank of issue until 1906
- Weimarische Bank (1853-?), bank of issue until end-1875
- Frankfurter Bank (1854-1970), bank of issue until 1901
- Kölnische Privatbank (1855-?), bank of issue until 1887
- Geraer Bank (1854-?), bank of issue until end-1875
- Bremer Bank (1856-2010), bank of issue 1857-1889
- Commerz-Bank in Lübeck (1856-?), bank of issue until 1886
- Danziger Privat-Actien-Bank (1856-1940), bank of issue 1857-1890
- Hannoversche Bank (1856-1920), bank of issue until 1889
- Magdeburger Privatbank (1856-1919), bank of issue until end-1890
- Mitteldeutsche Creditbank (1856-1929), bank of issue until end-1875
- Niedersächsische Bank zu Bückeburg (1856-?), bank of issue until end-1875
- Privatbank zu Gotha (1856-1920), bank of issue until end-1875
- Thüringische Bank (1855-1880), bank of issue until end-1875
- Sächsische Bank (1865-1945), bank of issue until 1935
- Kommunalständische Bank für die preußische Oberlausitz (1866-?), bank of issue until end-1875
- Leipziger Kassenverein (1867-?), bank of issue until 1890
- Badische Bank (1870-1978), bank of issue until 1935
- Württembergische Notenbank (1871-1978), bank of issue until 1935
- Bayerische Notenbank (1875-1935)
- Reichsbank (1876-1945)
- Deutsche Rentenbank (1923-1945), bank of issue until 1924
- Reichskreditkasse (1939-1945)
- Bank deutscher Länder (1948-1957)
- Deutsche Notenbank (1948-1968)
- Staatsbank der DDR (1968-1990)

The Oldenburgische Landesbank was a private bank of issue from establishment in 1868 until end-1875. The Deutsche Golddiskontbank (1924-1945) and Liquidity Consortium Bank (1974-2015) had purposes related with monetary policy even though they were not themselves money-issuing or central banks.

=== Other defunct banks headquartered in present-day German territory ===
Several of these banks came to an end in 1945 when the Soviet Forces in Germany decided to terminate existing banking activity in their occupation zone.

- Fugger Bank (16C-17C)
- Welser Bank (16C)
- Seyler & Tillemann (1750s-1763)
- M. A. Rothschild & Söhne (1766-1901)
- Prussian State Bank (1772-1945)
- Bavarian State Bank (1780-1971)
- C.G. Trinkaus (1785-2023)
- Sal. Oppenheim (1789-2018)
- A. Schaaffhausen'scher Bankverein (1791-1929)
- Mendelssohn & Co. (1795-1938)
- H. J. Merck & Co. (1799-1983)
- S. Bleichröder (1803-1931)
- Jacquier and Securius Bank (1817-1945)
- Simon Hirschland Bank (1841-1938)
- Disconto-Gesellschaft (1851-1929)
- Darmstädter Bank (1853-1922)
- Bankhaus Veit L. Homburger (1854-1939)
- Landesbank der Rheinprovinz (1854-1931)
- Berliner Handels-Gesellschaft (1856-1970)
- Norddeutsche Bank (1856-1929)
- Bayerische Vereinsbank (1869-1998)
- Dresdner Bank (1872-2009)
- Nationalbank für Deutschland (1881-1922)
- Banco Transatlántico (1886-1994)
- Deutsche Orientbank (1905-1932)
- Reichs-Kredit-Gesellschaft (1917-1945)
- Danat-Bank (1922-1931)
- Südwestbank (1922-2017)
- Bank der Deutschen Arbeit (1924-1945)
- Landeskreditbank Baden-Württemberg (1924-1998)
- Badische Kommunale Landesbank (1929-1988)
- Westdeutsche Landesbank (1935-2009)
- Bankhaus Reuschel & Co. (1947-2010)
- GEFA Bank (1949-2019)
- Herstatt Bank (1955-1974)
- Landesbank Rheinland-Pfalz (1958-2008)
- WGZ Bank (1966-2016)
- Wüstenrot Bank (1968-2018)
- Schröder, Münchmeyer, Hengst & Co. (1969-2001)
- BHF Bank (1970-2017)
- Ost-West Handelsbank (1971-2006)
- Südwestdeutsche Landesbank Girozentrale (1988-1998)
- Düsseldorfer Hypothekenbank (1990-2019)
- Landesbank Sachsen (1992-2007)
- Comdirect Bank (1994-2020)
- Wirecard (1999-2020)
- Depfa Bank (2002-2022)
- Eurohypo (2003-2016)
- Hypo Real Estate (2003-2008)
- Fidor Bank (2009-2023)

=== Defunct German banks headquartered outside present-day Germany ===
This list includes former banks of issue as well as commercial banks, in the former eastern territories of Germany and its temporary conquests during World War I and World War II.

- Schlesische Landschaft (1770-1945)
- Pommersche Landschaft (1781-1945)
- Ritterschaftliche Privatbank in Pommern (1824-1877), bank of issue until end-1875
- Wm. Schlutow (1832-1934)
- Städtische Bank in Breslau (1848-1910), bank of issue until end-1893
- Schlesischer Bankverein (1856-1917)
- Provinzial-Aktienbank des Großherzogtums Posen (1857-1929), bank of issue until end-1890, from 1898 named Ostbank für Handel und Gewerbe with bank-of-issue role revived 1916–1918 as Darlehnskasse Ost
- Darlehnskasse Ost under direct military administration (1918-1922)
- Polish National Loan Bank (1916-1924), under German control until late 1918
- Bank of Issue in Poland (1940-1945)

== See also ==
- List of banks in the euro area
- List of banks in Europe
