= Ostsächsische Sparkasse Dresden =

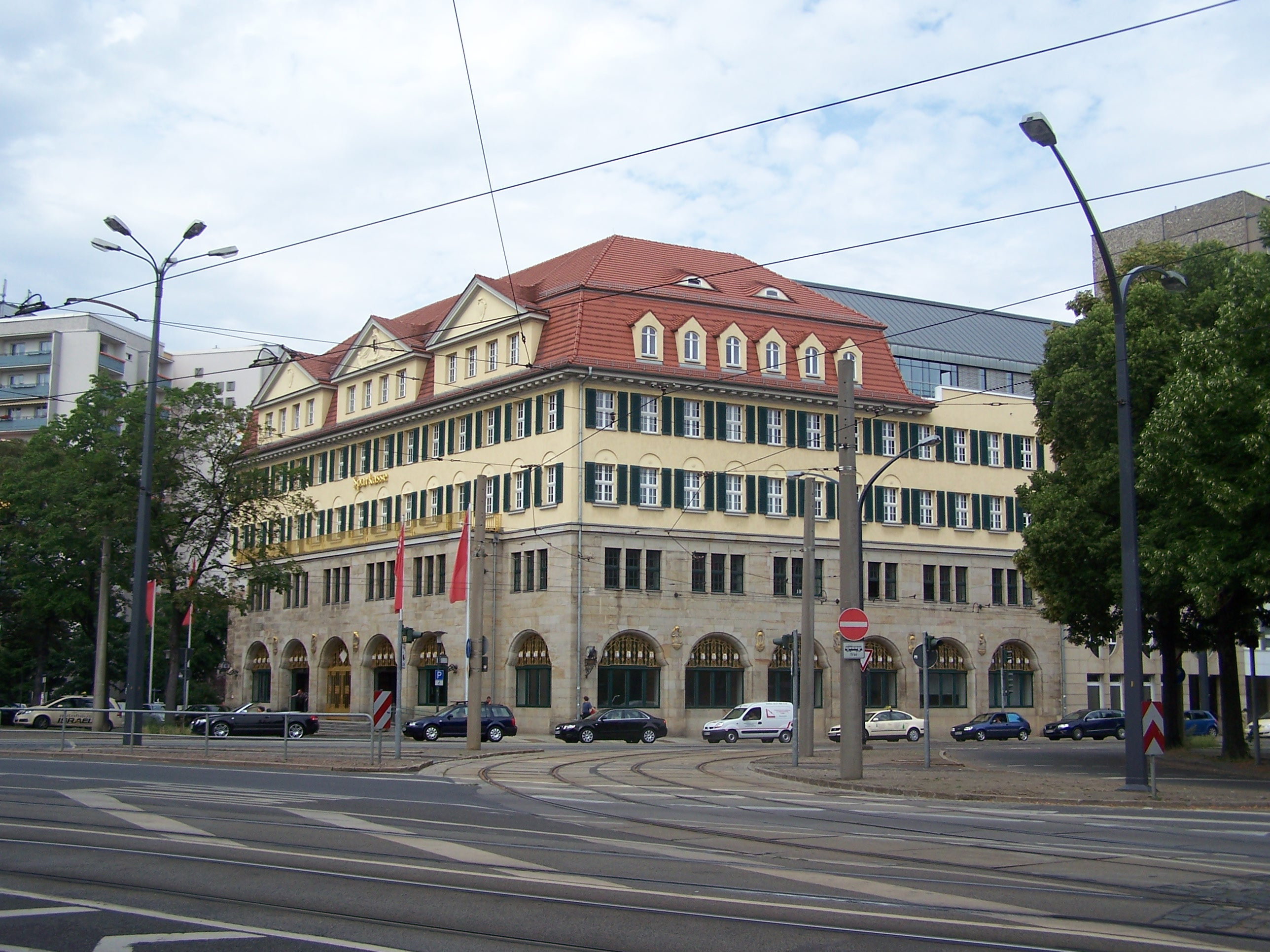
- Type: Anstalt des öffentlichen Rechts
- Industry: Banking, Financial services
- Founded: 1821
- Headquarters: Güntzplatz 5, Dresden, Germany
- Key people: Joachim Hoof Vorsitzender des Vorstands
- Products: consumer banking, corporate banking, finance and insurance, investment banking, mortgage loans, private banking, private equity, savings, Securities, asset management, wealth management, Credit cards
- Net income: 13,437,073.71 euro (2017)
- Total assets: € 12.2 billion (2015)
- Number of employees: 1,800 (2015)
- Website: www.ostsaechsische-sparkasse-dresden.de

Ostsächsische Sparkasse Dresden (Dresden East-Saxon Savings Bank) is a Sparkasse, a public savings bank based in Dresden, Saxony. It is the largest savings bank in eastern-Germany, and it is the seventh-largest savings bank in the Federal Republic of Germany in terms of total assets, with €12.2 billion.

== History ==
On February 3, 1821, the first savings bank was opened in the city of Dresden.

The second half of the 19th century and the beginning of the 20th century were determined by modernization and growth spurts. Saxony became the driving motor for the industrialization of Germany and the bank benefited from rising wages and increasing demand for credit. With the incorporations around the turn of the century numerous new district branches were opened, more professional management structure and staff training and cashless payment was enabled.

After a brief dip in the years of inflation, the real wage in 1923 stabilized again, as well as the account balance of the bank. The global economic crisis of 1929 and the Second World War along with the 1945 bombing of Dresden all led to deep crises in the bank. After the partition of Germany and the establishment of the East Germany the bank became part of the socialist planned economy for the next 40 years. In 1986, the bank's first ATM was set up at the Güntzplatz branch.

== Organization ==
As a public institution, the Ostsächsische Sparkasse Dresden is subject to the legal bases of the Savings Bank Act of the Free State of Saxony and the Articles of Association adopted by the Board of the Savings Bank. The governing bodies of savings banks are the supervisory board and the management board. The Ostsächsische Sparkasse Dresden is a member of the East German Savings Bank Association and is connected via this to the German Savings Banks and Giro Association.

Ostsächsische Sparkasse Dresden, like other savings banks in Saxony, is a fully owned subsidiary of Saxony Financial Group. Thus, the ultimate shareholders of the group are the Saxon municipalities and the Free State of Saxony.

== See also ==
- List of banks in Germany
