= Volksbank Stuttgart =

Cooperative bank in Stuttgart, Germany

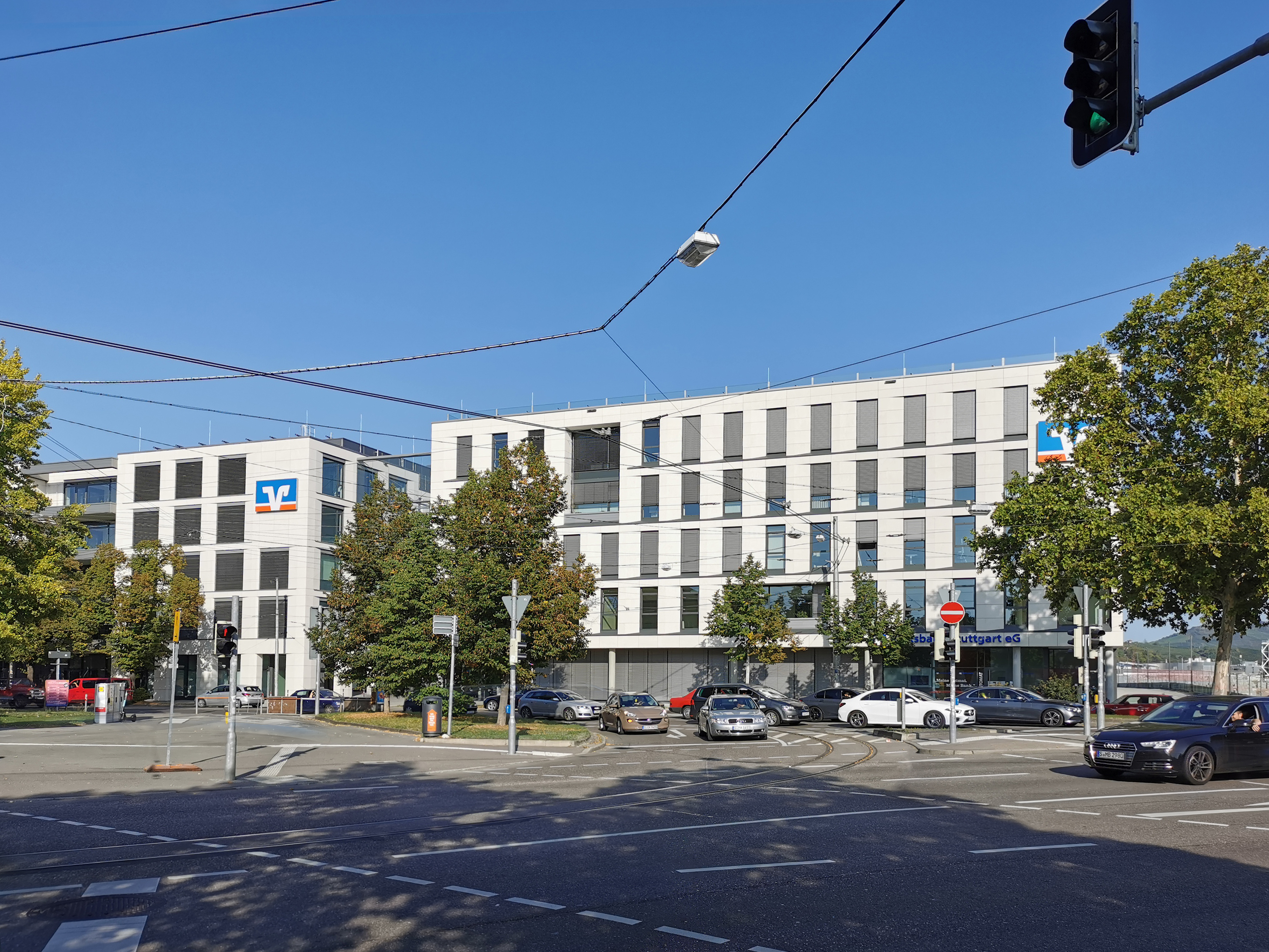
Headquarters in Stuttgart

Volksbank Stuttgart eG is a cooperative bank based in Stuttgart, Germany. It was created in a merger of Stuttgarter Volksbank AG and Volksbank Rems eG in 2010. The bank offers financial and investment services.

== See also ==
- List of banks in Germany
