= Kreissparkasse Ludwigsburg =

Coordinates: 48.8944°N 9.1874°E

- Company type: Anstalt des öffentlichen Rechts
- Industry: Financial services
- Founded: 1852
- Headquarters: Ludwigsburg, Germany
- Key people: Heinz-Werner Schulte Vorsitzender des Vorstands
- Net income: 9,293,991.97 euro (2017)
- Total assets: € 11.816 billion (2020)
- Number of employees: 1,460 (2020)
- Website: www.ksklb.de

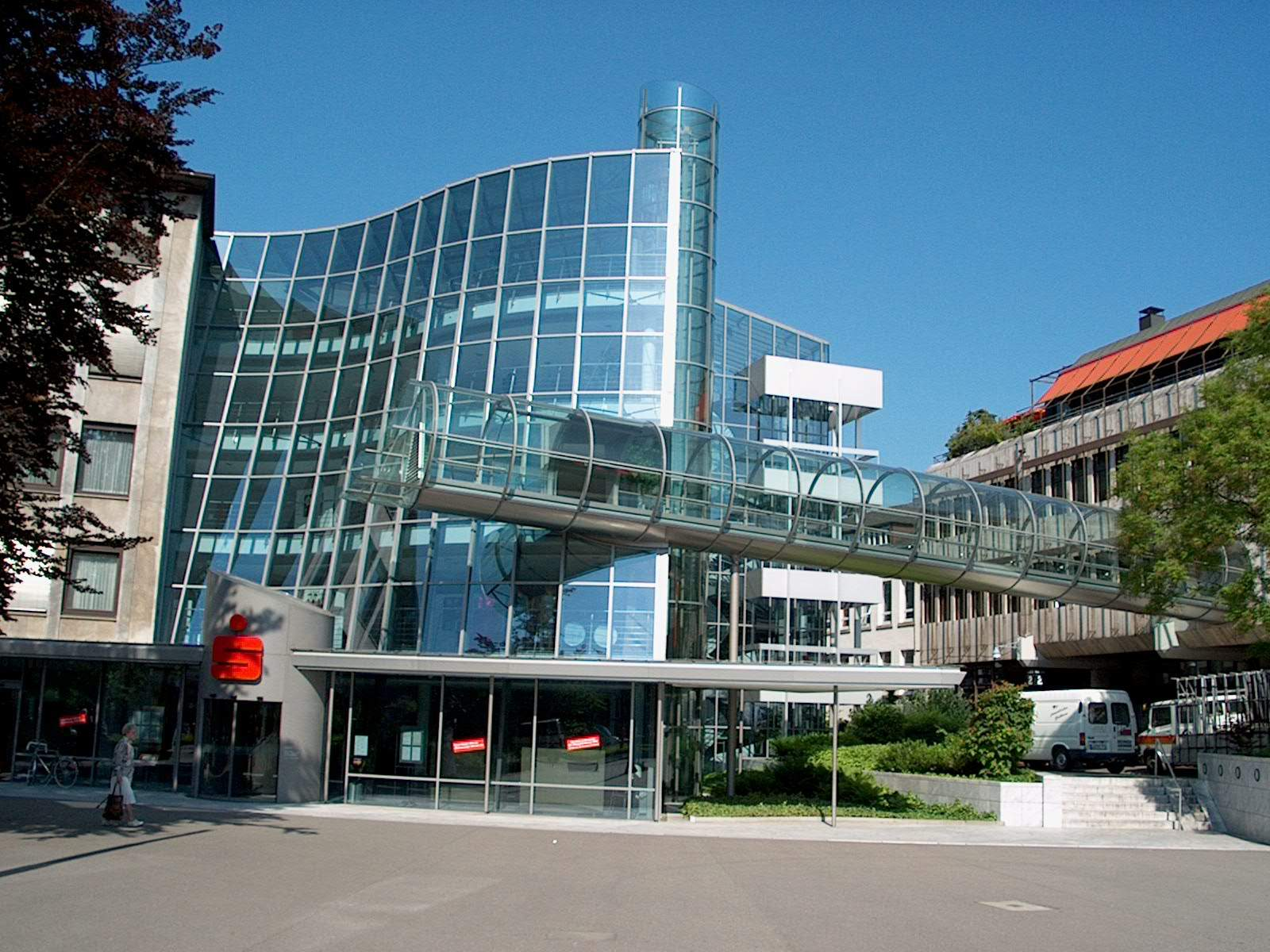
Kreissparkasse Ludwigsburg Hauptstelle Schillerplatz

Kreissparkasse Ludwigsburg is a savings bank with seat in Ludwigsburg.

== Business ==
It was founded in 1852. It has 1,460 employees at 101 locations in the district of Ludwigsburg and total assets of 11.82 Billion Euros. It provides financial services to small-scale businesses and retail banking customers.

== See also ==
- List of banks in Germany
