= GEFA Bank =

German finance company

GEFA Bank GmbH
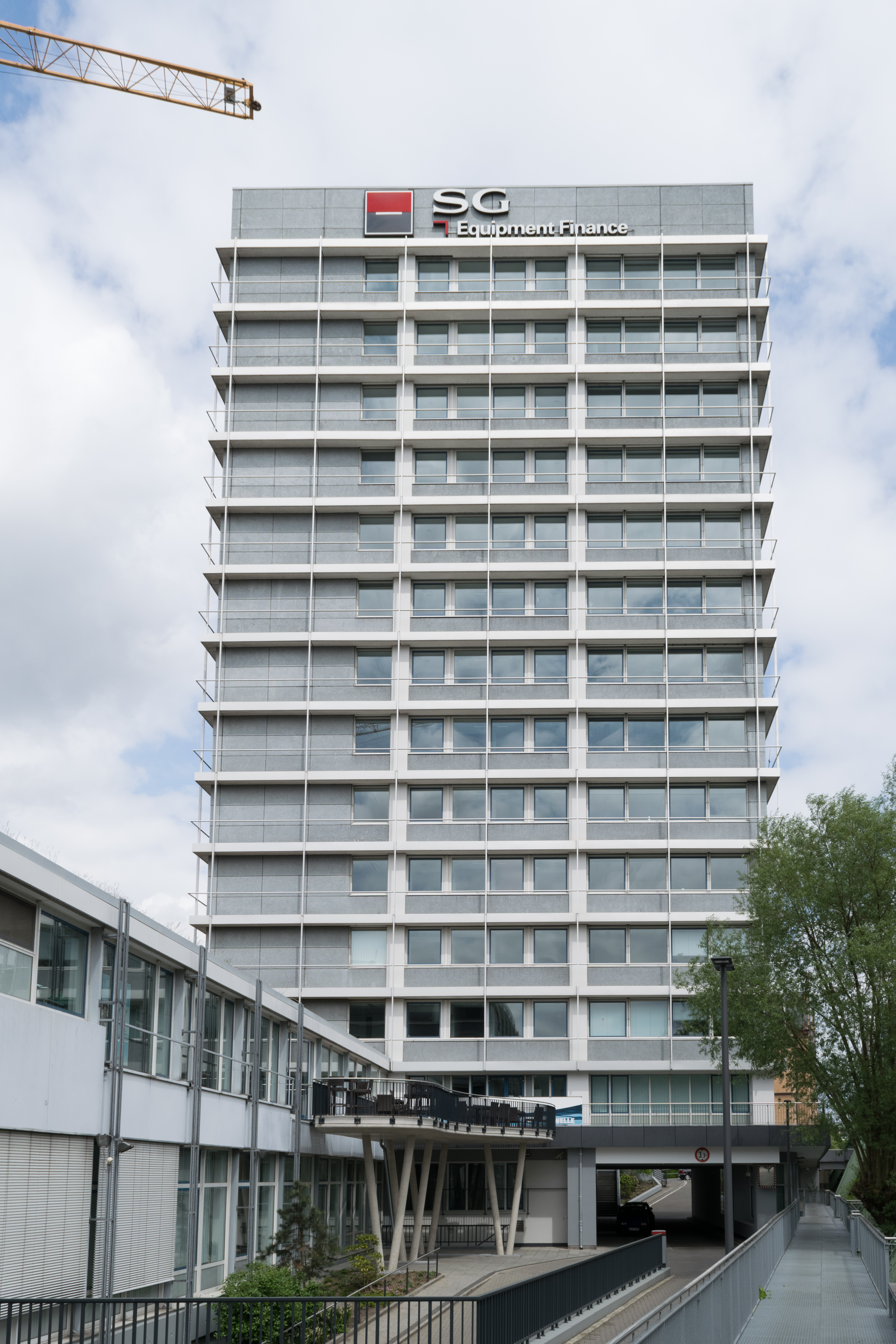
- Industry: Bank
- Founded: 1949
- Headquarters: Wuppertal
- Key people: Guido Zoeller (Chairman) Albrecht Haase (Management Spokesman) Martin Dornseiffer (Managing Director) Frederik Linthout (Managing Director)
- Total assets: €7.434 Mio. (2018)
- Number of employees: 673 (2018)
- Parent: Société Générale
- Website: www.gefa.de

Logo of the Societe Generale Equipment Finance

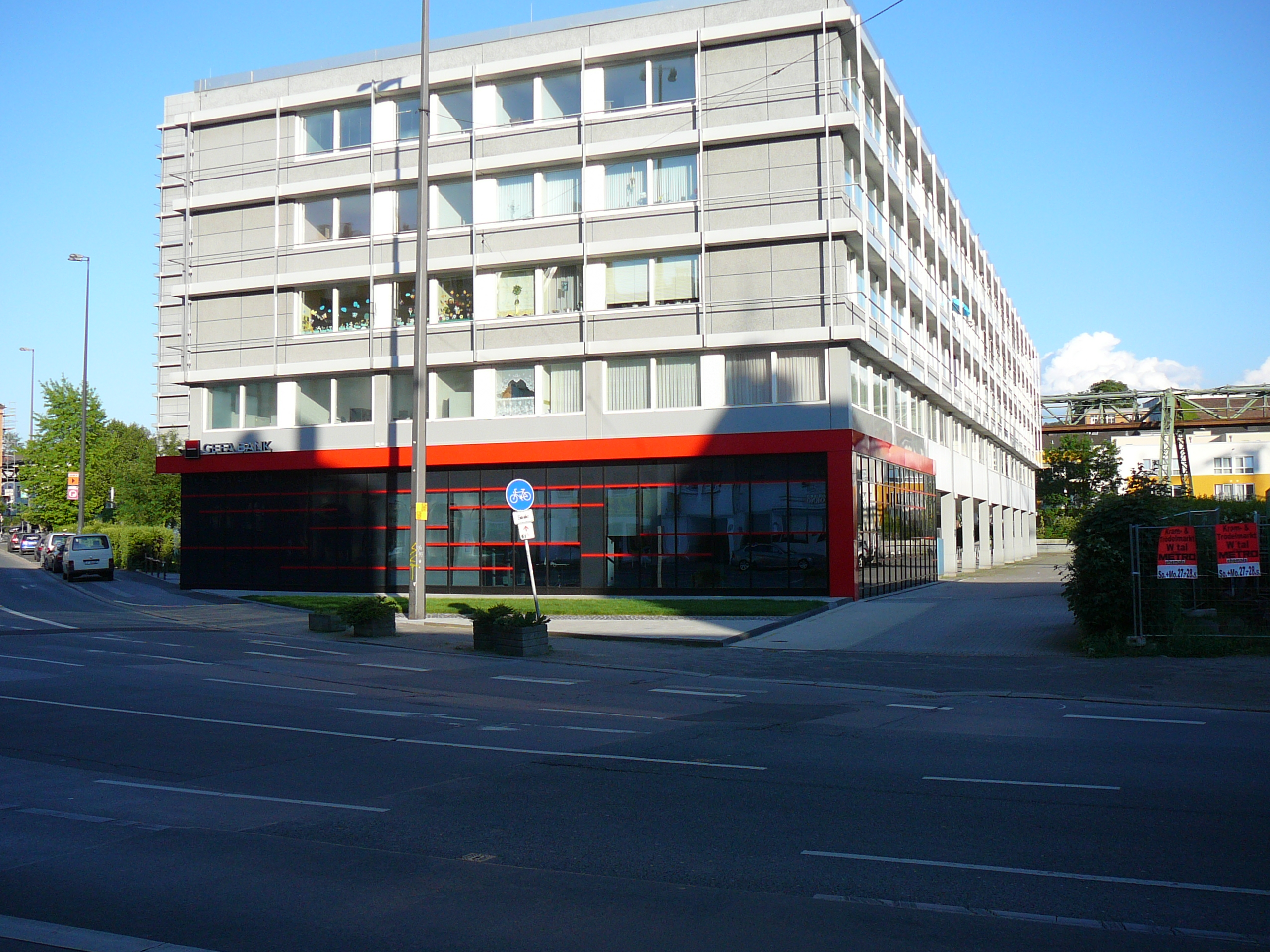
Former Headquarter GEFA

GEFA Bank GmbH is a financial services provider specialising in independent manufacturer sales and investment financing of mobile assets. The company was founded in 1949 as a subsidiary of the Deutsche Bank, with its headquarters based in Wuppertal at the Robert-Daum-Platz. It employs over 500 personnel in seven branches nationwide.

From 2001 to 2025, GEFA belonged to the major international bank Société Générale and sold its products under the umbrella brand Société Générale Equipment Finance. Société Générale Equipment Finance was represented in 19 European countries as well as Brazil, China and the USA, with more than 100 branches.

On May 23, 2016, the GEFA Gesellschaft für Absatzfinanzierung mbH and the GEFA-Leasing GmbH merged to form the GEFA Bank GmbH. At the end of 2019, all branches, including the registered commercial branch in Berlin, were closed.

== Products and services ==
In the area of investment funding, the GEFA offers mostly middle-class clients the following products:

- Investment credits
- Finance lease
- Operating lease
- Rent-to-own
- Truck-Trailer-Rent (via subsidiary PEMA GmbH)
- VAT-funding
- Full-Service-Vehicle-Lease
- Insurance
- Loyalty card

Additionally, the GEFA supports manufacturers and dealers, both domestically and internationally, via the SG Equipment Finance Network. The network offers the following financing solutions:

- Sales credits
- Sales and distribution lease
- Purchase funding
- Rent-park funding
- Rent
- Refinancing
- Insurances

In 2012 the GEFA started offering deposit banking to private customers, and started offering commercial deposit banking in 2014.

== Funded products ==
Funding in the form of loans is offered by GEFA for goods within the areas of transport (e.g. trucks, buses, business jets, riverboats, agricultural machinery), industrial production (e.g. construction machinery, printing machines, machine tools) and technology (e.g. hardware and software, office equipment, biomedical technology).

In 2015, the organisation generated a new business volume of €1,899 million, with €1,203 million in the transport sector, €435 million in the industrial goods sector and €261 million in the high tech sector.

== Deposit guarantee ==
The GEFA is subject to the legal deposit guarantee and is a member of the deposit protection fund of the Bundesverband deutscher Banken e.V.

== Technology ==
The brand GEFA Bank is affiliated with the cooperative data center of Fiducia IT AG in Karlsruhe and uses their agree21 banking software for IT operations. Additionally, a longstanding partnership exists with Paderborn-based company S&N.

== See also ==
- List of banks in Germany
