= Iranian-European Bank =

German bank

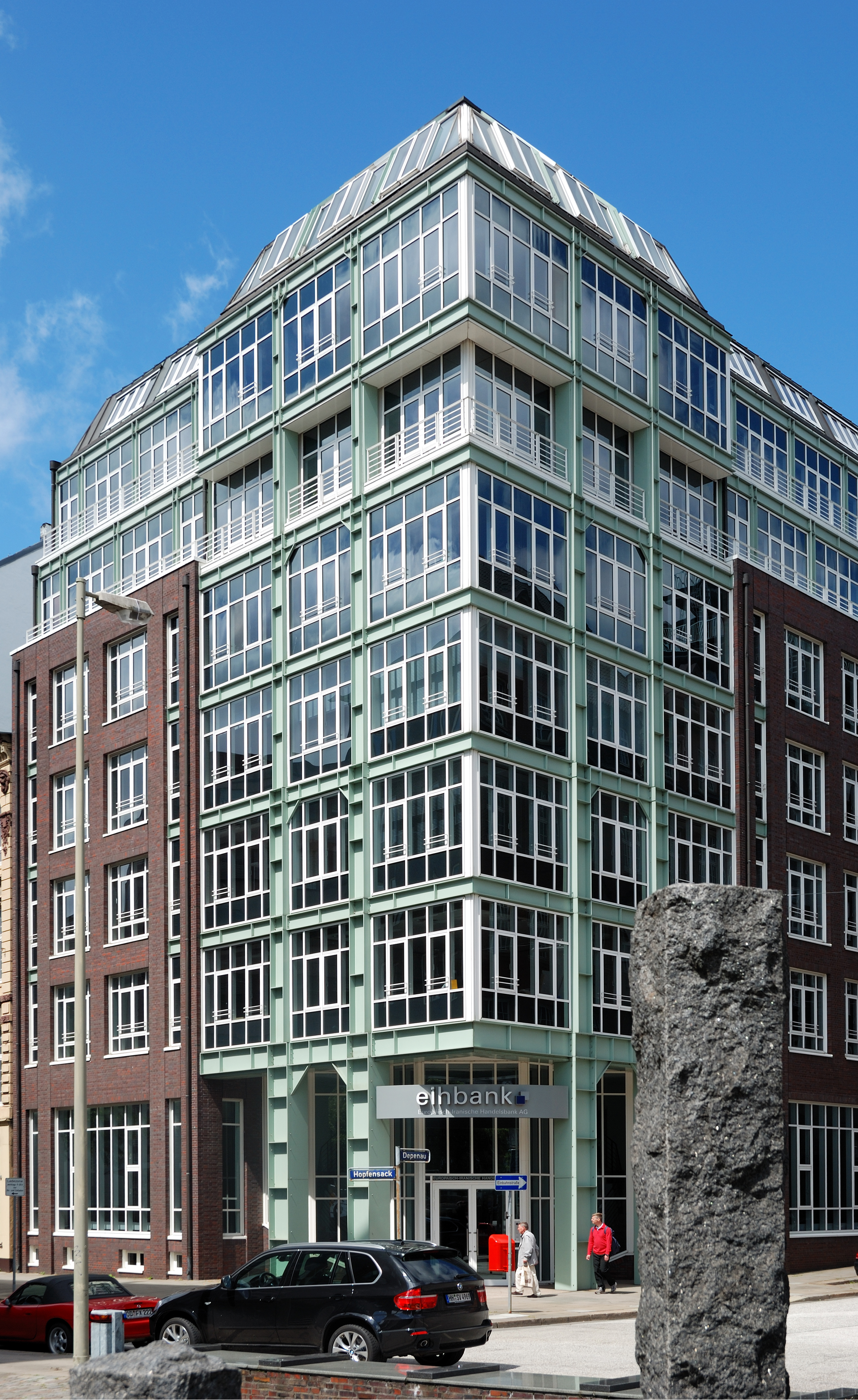
- IEB headquarters
- Formerly: Deutsch-Iranische Handelsbank AG
- Type: Aktiengesellschaft
- Industry: Financial services
- Founded: 1971; 55 years ago
- Headquarters: Hamburg, Germany
- Number of locations: 3
- Owner: Bank of Industry and Mine (53%); Bank Mellat (26.31%); Bank Tejarat (20.69%)
- Number of employees: 75
- Website: eihbank.de

Iranian-European Bank (German: Europäisch-Iranische Handelsbank AG; Persian: بانک تجارتی ایران و اروپا, Bank Tejareti-ye Iran vâ Erupa) is a German bank founded in 1971. Headquartered in Hamburg, it has two other branches in Kish Island (opened in 2005) and Tehran (representative office turned into branch in 2008). The European-Iranian Commercial Bank is a German joint stock company. It is (majority) owned by Iranian Bank for Industries and Mines (52%), Iranian Bank Mellat (26%), and Iranian Bank Tejarat (19%).

Its biggest shareholder is an Iranian state-owned bank, Bank of Industry and Mine, and other major stakeholders include Bank Mellat and Bank Tejarat. Due to sanctions against Iran, the bank was not operative between 2011 and 2016. In 2018, before the US pulled out of the Iran deal and reinstated their sanctions, German tabloid Bild obtained information about plans to fly out €300 million ($350 million) in cash. Iran subsequently canceled their request for the German financial authority BaFin to release that money held by the European-Iranian Trade Bank.

== See also ==
- List of banks in Germany
