= BMW Bank =

Finance service and a company of the BMW Group

BMW Bank GmbH
- Company type: GmbH
- Founded: 1971
- Headquarters: Munich
- Total assets: €28 billion (2018)
- Number of employees: 1,309 (2018)
- Website: www.bmwbank.de

The BMW Bank GmbH is a finance service and a company of the BMW Group. The company known under BMW Group Financial Services was founded in 1971 in Munich, Germany. In 1973, the BMW Leasing GmbH was added – also situated in Munich. The fabricated products are BMW, MINI and Rolls-Royce Motor Cars. Worldwide BMW Group Financial Services are represented in 53 countries with 26 companies and 27 corporations.

The range of BMW Group Financial Services includes merchandise funding and financing stockkeeping of automobile and replacement parts for the BMW and MINI retailers as well as purchase funding and financing for automobiles and motorbikes for the customers of the BMW and MINI retailers (Installments and 3-Options-Financing BMW Select). In addition the range also includes the financing of one year-old-used cars as well as the allocation of cash credits. In the area of asset management services the company offers MobilPlan onTop (savings account with car purchase bonus), MobilPlus (call money), fixed deposit, (savings bond), Multimanager Investmentfonds (investment funds), BMW-Card (credit card for BMW-drivers), Online-Tagesgeld (call money), Fonds-Navigator (funds navigator) and Spar + Invest (save + invest), Bonus on Top.

The leasing sector comprises the product line of the leasing businesses with a variety of items for the BMW and MINI retailers, especially for the automobile branch. Optional services like insurance, maintenance and repair can be added. The distribution proceeds via the trading organization of the BMW Group as well as via direct sales in the area of asset management services and Direct Finance.

== See also ==
- History of BMW
- List of banks in the euro area
- List of banks in Germany
