= Donner & Reuschel =

German bank

Coordinates: 53.5526°N 9.9965°E

- Company type: Limited company
- Industry: Banking
- Founded: 1798; 227 years ago
- Founder: Conrad Hinrich Donner
- Headquarters: Germany
- Number of employees: 580

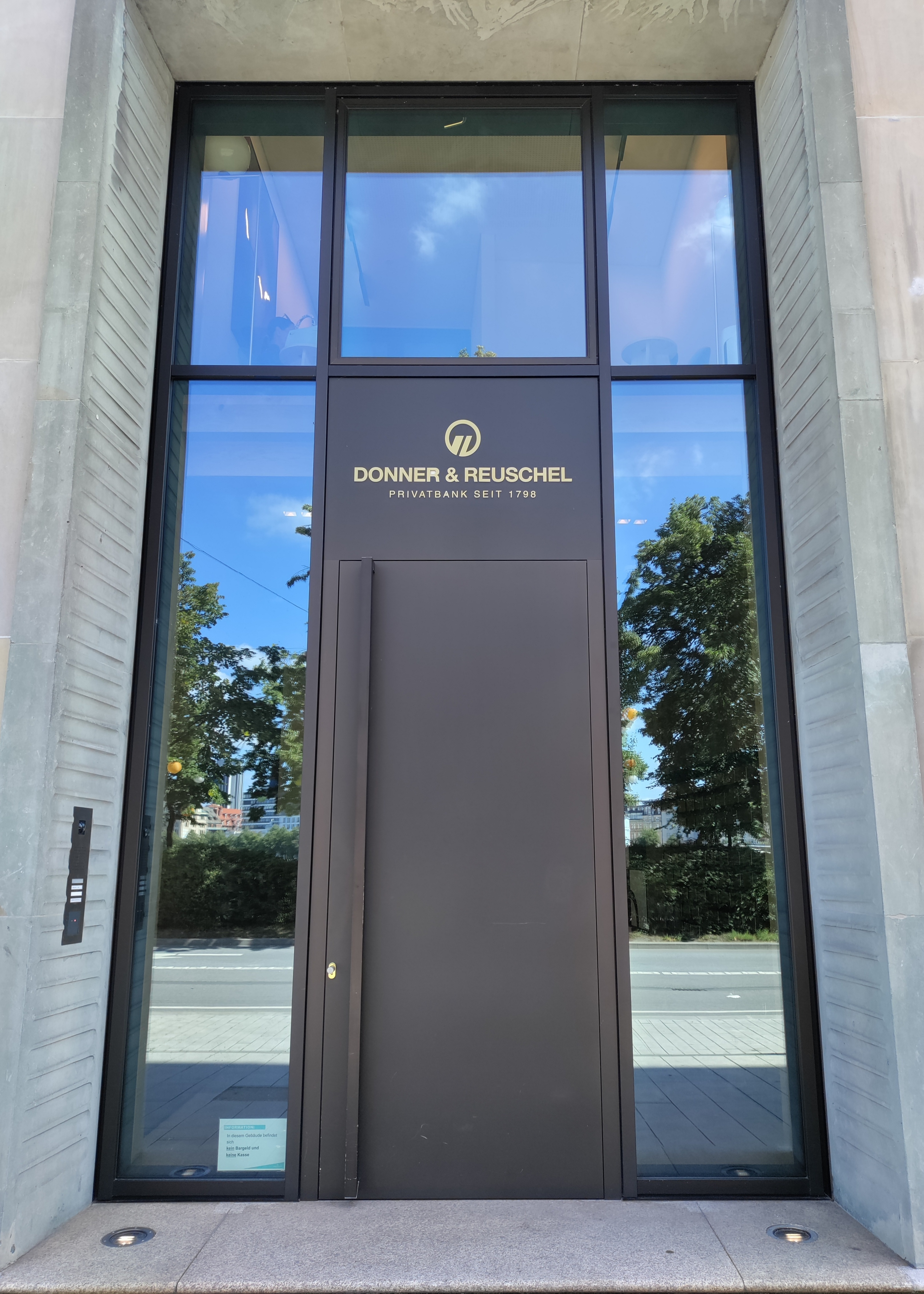
Entrance of the Donner & Reuschel bank in Hamburg

Donner & Reuschel AG is a German bank organised as a limited company (Aktiengesellschaft) and headquartered in Hamburg. Until 2010, it was known as Conrad Hinrich Donner Bank AG. The bank specialises in private banking and has 580 employees in Hamburg, Munich and other offices. It has a subsidiary in Luxembourg, Donner & Reuschel Luxemburg S.A. In 2009 and 2010, it was recognised as Hamburg's best employer. Since 1999 the bank is a part of the Signal Iduna insurance and financial services group.

The bank was founded in 1798 by Conrad Hinrich Donner, a Hamburg merchant and ship-owner, and originally named Hamburger Banco. It was originally a merchant house specialising in transportation and shipping.

The bank has around €28,1 billion assets under management.

== See also ==
- List of banks in Germany

== Literature ==
- Kristina Dörge: "200 Jahre Conrad Hinrich Donner Bank", Hamburg, 1998.
