= Conrad Hinrich Donner =

German banker and art collector

Conrad Hinrich Donner (11 April 1774, in Altona – 1 January 1854) was a German banker and art collector.

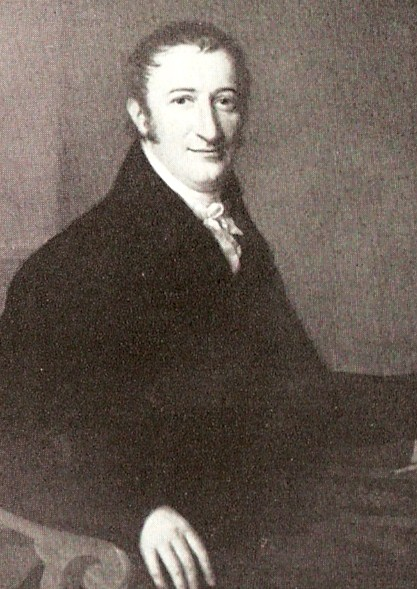
Conrad Hinrich Donner

== Life ==
Conrad Hinrich Donner was the son of Johann Christian Donner (1739-1804), a buyer and the Danish consul in Hamburg and Maria Anterrer (1742-1802) from Altona. Donner was at first the owner of a tobacco factory with 150 workers. In 1798 he established the Company Conrad Hinrich Donner for the sale of goods and the provision of marine insurance (Assekuranz). Company Conrad Hinrich Donner was also a shipping company from which sailing boats operated. Later the banking transactions stepped ever more into the foreground, with the formation of Conrad Hinrich Donner Bank. He had close business ties to the shipping magnate Johann Cesar VI. Godeffroy. In 1820 Donner bought Sieveking Garden (today Donners Park de:Donners Park) and there in 1843 he established an art museum containing sculptures of Bertel Thorvaldsen and Herman Wilhelm Bissen). The museum and an orangery was designed by of Gottfried Semper. Conrad Hinrich Donner donated large sums for charitable purposes and was a promoter of art and science. Through his father, Donner was a personal friend of King Christian VIII of Denmark who stayed with him at Altona.
