= Düsseldorfer Hypothekenbank =

German mortgage bank

Coordinates: 51.221179°N 6.781893°E

Düsseldorfer Hypothekenbank AG
- Company type: Corporation
- Industry: Mortgage bank
- Founded: 19 March 1990
- Headquarters: Düsseldorf, Germany
- Total assets: €6.866 billion (2016)
- Number of employees: 65 (2016)
- Website: www.duesshyp.de

The Düsseldorfer Hypothekenbank AG, also known as DüssHyp, was a mortgage bank based in Düsseldorf that specializes in government and real estate financing. (Until the mortgage bank law was abrogated, this term referred to a private law credit institution granting long-term loans secured by mortgages and loans to public authorities.) Refinancing takes place through issuing bonds via the capital market.

The bank specializes in commercial real estate financing. It only engages in direct business to a limited extent; the focus is on syndicate business.

== History ==
The institute was founded by the entrepreneur de:Wolfgang Schuppli . As a consequence of the 2008 financial crisis, it was necessary for the deposit guarantee fund (de:Einlagensicherungsfonds) of the Federal Association of German Banks (BdB) to take over the shares in 2008. It sold them in 2010 to LSF5 German Investments II, L.P. in Delaware, USA (94%) and to LSF5 Riverside Ltd. & Co KG in Frankfurt, Germany (6%) companies belonging to the Lone Star Group. This group was also a shareholder of the Corealcredit Bank. Schuppli later sued the BdB and other defendants for approx. € 500 million in damages because the sale came only through threat and coercion. The charge was dismissed in the first instance. The balance sheet total decreased to € 11 billion as of 30 June 2013 compared to the end of the previous year. The accumulated loss amounted to € 516.4 million in mid-2013; This result was essentially based on the loss carryforward, thus largely coming from the result of earlier financial years. In December 2013, with the maturity of a bond issued by the Düsseldorfer Hypothekenbank of 1.1 billion, the last remaining liquidity guarantee of the SoFFin was repaid.

The Lone Star Group - allegedly - sold their shares to the MainFirst founder Patrick Bettscheider and the British investment company Attestor Capital. However, it became known in March 2015 that the Düsseldorfer Hypothekenbank once again faced bank failure in the wake of the Hypo Alpe Adria crisis, implying that the ownership status was unclear.

On 15 March 2015, the Federal Association of German Banks announced that the private-sector deposit guarantee fund provided a guarantee for the so-called Heta bonds in order to eliminate the acute risks. The aim is to take over the bank through the Deposit Guarantee Fund. According to its 2017 Annual Report, an investment company of the Deposit Guarantee Fund is the sole shareholder.

The Bank is a member of the Association of German Banks (de: Bundesverband deutscher Banken )and the Verband deutscher Pfandbriefbanken'.

== Key figures ==
Reference number	2016	2015	2014	2013
New real estate business (EUR million)	0	162	712	494
Real estate loans portfolio (EUR million)	1.033	1.405	1.213	1.093
Capital markets (portfolio) (EUR million)	4.478	5.445	8.445	9.462
Earnings after taxes (EUR million)	−94,0	−40,7	−42,0	−59,6
Core capital ratio	13,1 %	10,5 %	10,8 %	13,2 %

== See also ==
- List of banks in Germany
