= Georg Fahrenschon =

German politician

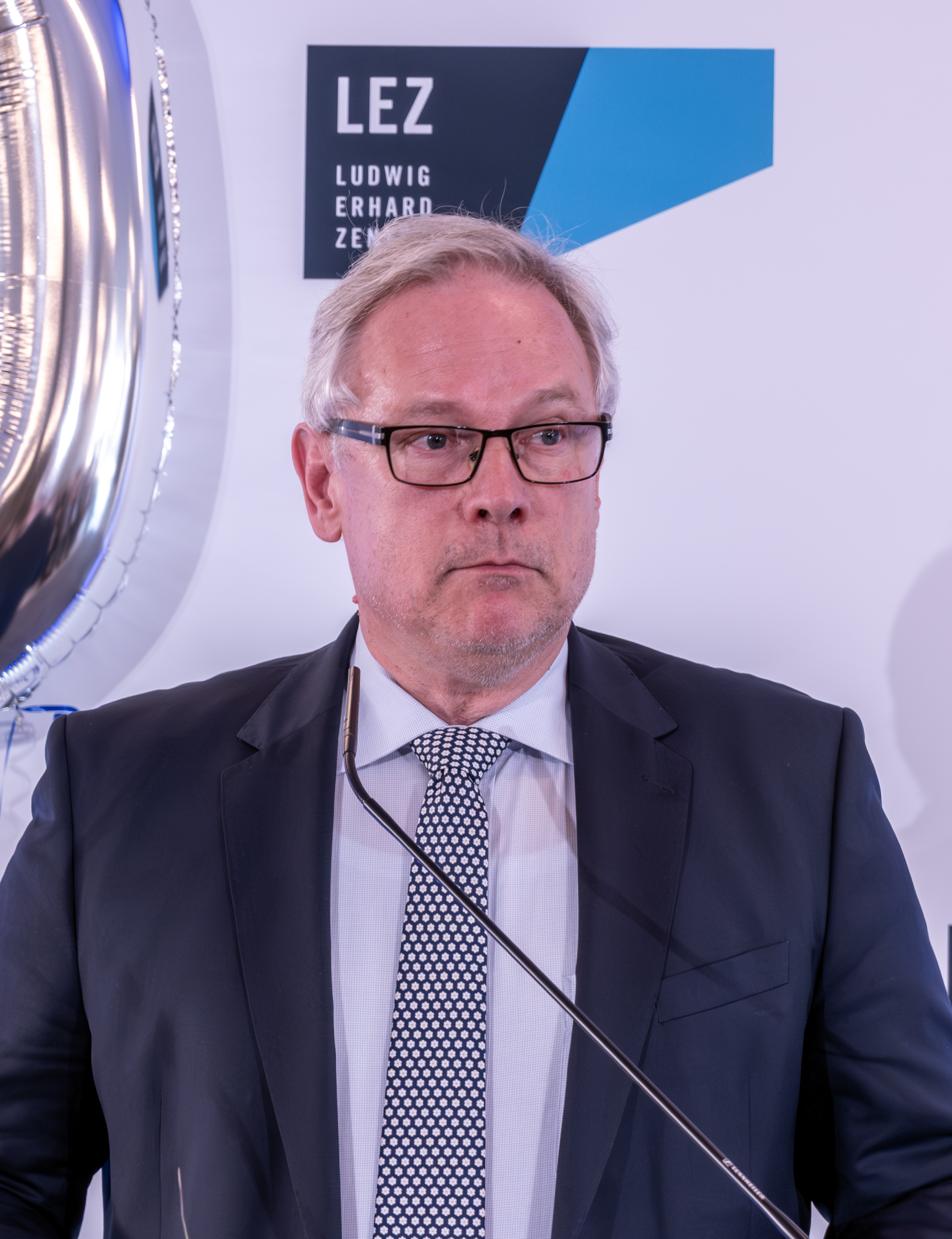
- Fahrenschon in 2026

Minister of Finance of Bavaria
- In office 30 October 2008 – 3 November 2011
- Minister-President: Horst Seehofer
- Preceded by: Erwin Huber
- Succeeded by: Markus Söder

Member of the Landtag of Bavaria; for Eichstätt
- In office May 2011 – March 2012
- Preceded by: Siegfried Schneider
- Succeeded by: Alex Dorow

Member of the Bundestag; from Bavaria
- In office 17 October 2002 – 8 November 2007
- Preceded by: Martin Mayer
- Succeeded by: Marion Seib
- Constituency: State list (2002–2005); Munich Land (2005–2007)

Personal details
- Born: 8 February 1968 (age 58) Munich, West Germany
- Party: Christian Social Union
- Education: University of Augsburg
- Profession: Economist
- Website: georg-fahrenschon.de

Georg Fahrenschon (born 8 February 1968) is a German politician of the Christian Social Union (CSU). From 2008 to 2011, he served as finance minister in the Bavarian State Ministry of Finance. He was a member of the Bundestag of Germany until 2007.

== Early life and education ==
Fahrenschon graduated with a diplom in economics from the University of Augsburg in 1999.

== Career ==
=== Member of the German Bundestag, 2002-2007 ===
Following the 2002 federal elections, Fahrenschon became a Member of the German Bundestag, where he served on the Finance Committee. Within the Finance Committee, he was the CDU/CSU parliamentary group's rapporteur on Germany's Transparency Directive Implementation Act (Transparenzrichtlinie-Umsetzungsgesetz, TUG), among others.

=== State Minister of Finance, 2008-2011 ===
Following the Bavarian state elections in 2008, Fahrenschon was made State Minister of Finance in the cabinet of Minister-President Horst Seehofer. During his time in office, he led the talks with his Austrian counterpart Josef Proell in 2009 about Austria nationalizing Hypo Alpe-Adria-Bank International, a local unit of BayernLB, after heavy losses tied to loans in Southeast and Eastern Europe had driven the overextended lender to the brink of collapse.

In the negotiations to form a coalition government following the 2009 federal elections, Fahrenschon was a member of the working group on taxes, national budget and financial policy, led by Thomas de Maizière and Hermann Otto Solms.

In 2011, Fahrenschon presented a proposal envisaging tax cuts of 5 billion euros ($6.5 billion) for lower- and middle incomes by 2013, the year of the subsequent federal election; this move put him in conflict with federal Finance Minister Wolfgang Schäuble, who wanted to delay tax cuts to cut Germany's budget deficit.

=== President of the German Savings Banks Association, 2012-2017 ===
In October 2011, it became known that both Fahrenschon and Steffen Kampeter, Parliamentary State Secretary at the German Finance Ministry would be seeking the presidency of the DSGV after incumbent Heinrich Haasis stepped down.

In 2012, Fahrenschon led Germany's savings banks in helping quash a proposal for Europe-wide deposit guarantees. He later sought to limit the remaining aspects of a European banking union, namely a joint resolution fund and central supervision of all the region's lenders. Eventually, it was agreed that day-to-day supervision of all but one of the 417 Sparkassen – the largest, the Hamburger Sparkasse is the exception – would remain in German hands.

In November 2017, shortly before Fahrenschon was scheduled to stand for re-election for another six-year term, prosecutors in Munich charged Fahrenschon with tax evasion; he admitted to having filed his tax statements for 2012, 2013 and 2014 too late but denied the allegation and declined to pay a fine. Following internal and public pressure, he resigned from his post.

== Personal life ==
Fahrenschon is married and has two daughters.

== Other activities ==
=== Regulatory bodies ===
- Federal Financial Supervisory Authority (BaFin), Member of the Administrative Council (2012–2017)

=== Financial institutions ===
- European Savings Banks Group (ESBG), Member of the Board (2012–2017)
- Federal Association of Public Banks in Germany (VÖB), Member of the Board
- KfW, Member of the supervisory board, of the Remuneration Committee and of the Audit Committee
- DekaBank, chairman of the supervisory board and Chairman of the Remuneration Committee
- Helaba, Member of the supervisory board and the Board of Public Owners
- Berlin Hyp, Chairman of the Supervisory Board
- Landesbank Berlin Holding (LBB), Chairman of the Supervisory Board
- Landwirtschaftliche Rentenbank, Member of the Supervisory Board
- Giesecke & Devrient (G&D), Member of the Advisory Board
- BayernLB, chairman of the supervisory board (2008–2011)
- SaarLB, Member of the supervisory board (2007–2008)

=== State-owned companies ===
- Flughafen München GmbH, chairman of the supervisory board (2008–2011)
- Messe München GmbH, Member of the Supervisory Board

=== Scientific institutions ===
- Medical Center of LMU Munich, Member of the Supervisory Board
- Max Planck Institute of Biochemistry, Member of the Board of Trustees
- Max Planck Institute of Neurobiology, Member of the Board of Trustees
- Max Planck Institute for Tax Law and Public Finance, Member of the Board of Trustees
- Munich School of Philosophy, Member of the Board of Trustees
- Ifo Institute for Economic Research, Member of the Board of Trustees

=== Others ===
- Cultural Foundation of the Federal States, Member of the Board of Trustees
- Deutsche Sporthilfe, Member of the Foundation's Council
- Deutsches Museum, Member of the Supervisory Board
- Sparkassenstiftung für internationale Kooperation (Savings Banks Foundation for International Cooperation, SBFIC), chairman of the Board of Trustees (2012–2017)
- Hochschule der Sparkassen-Finanzgruppe - University of Applied Sciences, chairman of the advisory board (2012–2017)
- Goethe-Institut, Member of the Business and Industry Advisory Board
- Kulturkreis der deutschen Wirtschaft, Member of the Board of Directors
- Market Economy Foundation (Stiftung Marktwirtschaft), Member of the Political Advisory Board
- Forum Kapitalmarktinstrumente – Kapitalmarktfinanzierung, Member of the Advisory Board
- Ludwig Erhard Foundation, Member
- Munich Finance Forum, Member
- Stiftung Brandenburger Tor, Member of the Board of Trustees
- Schloss Neuhardenberg Foundation, chairman of the Board of Trustees (2012–2017)
- Graf von Montgelas-Stiftung, Member of the Board of Trustees
- Central Committee of German Catholics (ZdK), Member

== See also ==
- List of Bavarian Christian Social Union politicians
