= Sparkasse Mittelholstein =

Free public savings bank in Germany

Coordinates: 54.303241°N 9.667513°E

Sparkasse Mittelholstein AG

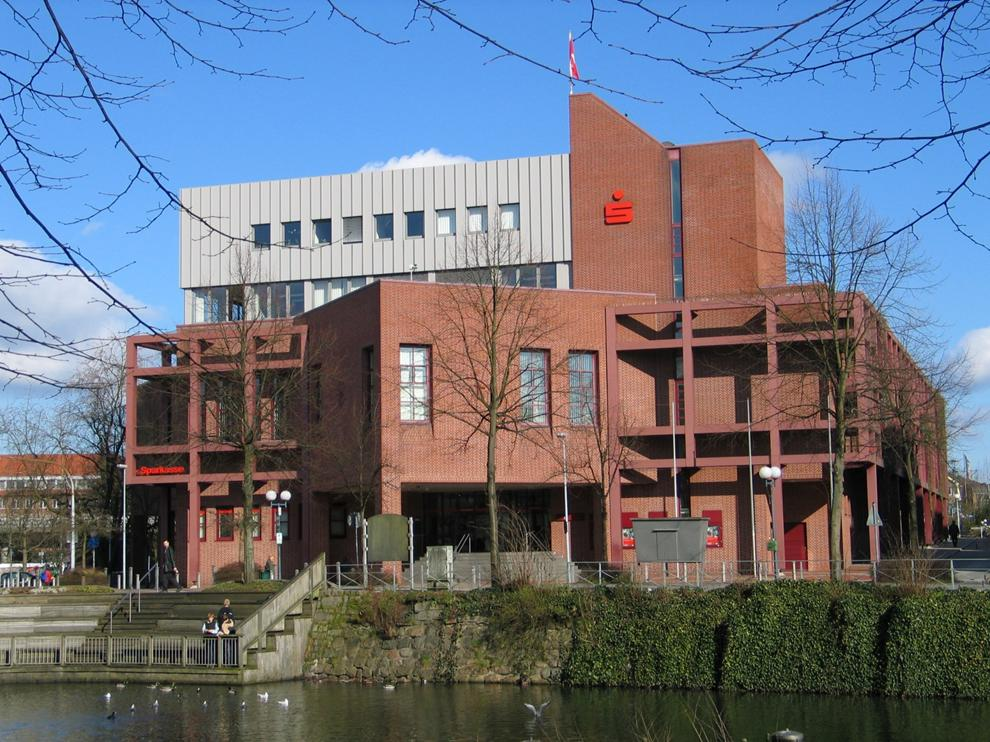
- Main office in Rendsburg, Röhlingsplatz 1
- Type: Joint-stock company (Aktiengesellschaft AG)
- Industry: Financial services
- Founded: 1991; 35 years ago
- Founder: Johann Georg Röhling
- Headquarters: Rendsburg, Germany
- Products: Banking services
- Total assets: €2.674 billion (2018)
- Number of employees: 480 (2018)
- Parent: Sparkassen- und Giroverband für Schleswig-Holstein
- Website: www.spk-mittelholstein.de

The Sparkasse Mittelholstein is a German savings bank or Sparkassen-Finanzgruppe that is based in Rendsburg. It is one of five free public savings banks in Germany. The Sparkasse Mittelholstein operates a universal banking business.

As of 2017, according to the savings bank rankings, it is ranked 142nd in terms of total assets. It had 26 branches/self-service locations and 480 employees.

== History ==
The Sparkasse Mittelholstein was created in 1823 under the name Spar- und Leih-Kasse in Rendsburg as a foundation savings bank. The foundation's capital was 1,500 Mark courant. The founder was Johann Georg Röhling.

In 1847, another predecessor institute was founded, the Spar- und Leihcasse in Nortorf. In 1979 it merged with the Verbandssparkasse Nortorf to create Sparkasse Nortorf. In 1862, the Hademarscher Spar- und Leihcasse - Verein, the third predecessor institute was created. It was converted in 1899 into a public limited company and thus forms the origin of the present form of the company.

In 1973, the Hademarscher Spar- und Leihcasse AG merged with the Kirchspiel Spar- und Leihkasse zu Hanerau to Sparkasse Hanerau-Hademarschen AG. This was the first savings bank as a joint-stock company in the Federal Republic of Germany.

The current institute was founded in 1991. In 2007, the takeover of the public legally Sparkasse Büdelsdorf took place. The city Büdelsdorf, as a sponsor of the former Sparkasse Büdelsdorf, received in return shares of the Sparkasse Mittelholstein AG and has since participated in their share capital.

On 1 July 2017, retroactively to 1 January 2017, the Sparkasse Mittelholstein merged with Sparkasse Hennstedt-Wesselburen.

== Organization structure ==
The Sparkasse Mittelholstein is a savings bank in Schleswig-Holstein. Since 1991 it has been a Joint-stock company registered in the German Trade Register of Kiel. The legal basis for the Sparkasse is essentially the Kreditwesengesetz (KWG) and the Savings Banks Act for Schleswig-Holstein. The bodies of the Sparkasse are the Annual General Meeting, the Supervisory Board and the Management Board.

As of 2018, the share capital of the Sparkasse Mittelholstein AG is held by the following shareholders:

- Haspa Finanzholding – 51,45 %
- Zweckverband der Sparkasse Hennstedt-Wesselburen - 20,28 %
- Stiftung Spar- und Leih-Kasse in Rendsburg – 13,37 %
- Private shareholders and employees – 6,77 %
- Stadt Büdelsdorf – 5,14 %
- Zweckverband Sparkasse Mittelholstein – 1,69 %
- Stadt Rendsburg – 1,30 %

== Business partners ==
The Sparkasse works together with the following partners in the network business:

- DekaBank (Germany)
- Deutsche Leasing AG
- Hamburger Sparkasse AG
- HSH Nordbank AG
- LBS Bausparkasse Schleswig-Holstein-Hamburg AG
- MSH – Mittelstandsfonds Schleswig-Holstein
- Norddeutsche Landesbank
- PLUSCARD a service company for credit card processing mbH Mastercard and VisaCard
- Provinzial NordWest
- S-Broker
- Sparkassen-Finanzgruppe
- UKV, a company of the Versicherungskammer Bayern (VKB)

== See also ==
- List of banks in Germany
