= Berlin Hyp =

German mortgage bank

Coordinates: 52.50663°N 13.34776°E

Berlin Hyp AG
- Company type: Corporation
- Industry: Mortgage bank
- Predecessor: Berliner Hypothekenbankverein; Brandenburgische Provinzialbank und Girozentrale; Kur- und Neumärkische Ritterschaftliche Darlehns-Kasse; Preussische Zentralstadtschaft; Stadtschaft der Mark Brandenburg; Prussian State Bank
- Founded: 1868
- Headquarters: Berlin, Germany
- Total assets: €27.178 billion (2018)
- Number of employees: 596 (2018)
- Parent: Landesbank Berlin
- Website: www.berlinhyp.de

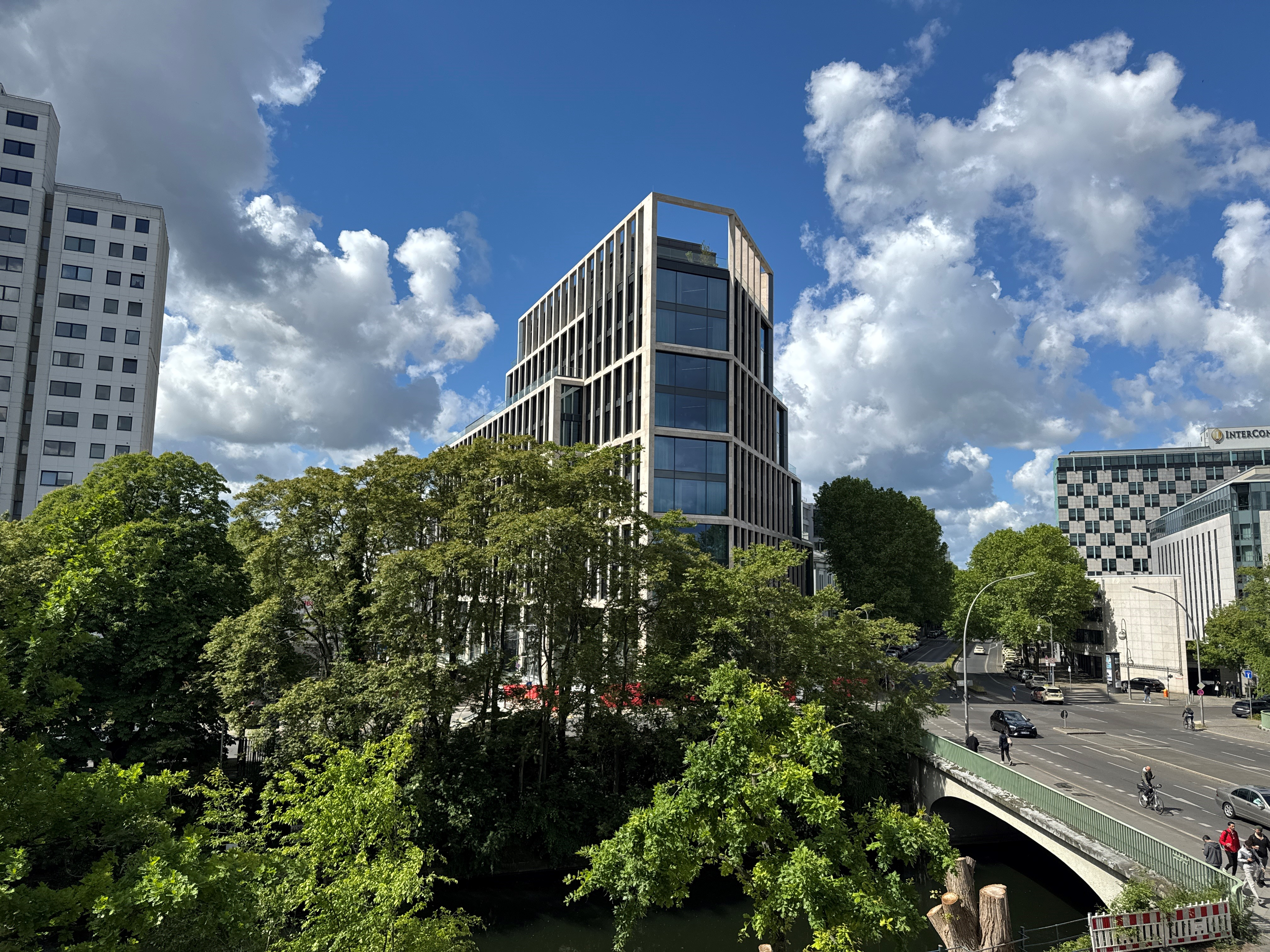
New headquarters since 2020, Berlin

The Berlin Hyp AG, based in Berlin, is one of the large German real estate and mortgage banks. The bank was created in 1996 from the merger of Berliner Hypotheken- und Pfandbriefbank AG and Braunschweig-Hannoversche Hypothekenbank AG.

The Berlin Hyp focuses its sales activities on business with investors, housing companies, real estate funds, investment companies and selected developers. Regionally, it concentrates on economically strong metropolitan areas in Germany and various foreign markets in Europe.

== History ==
The Berlin Hyp's first predecessor institute, the Berliner Pfandbriefinstitut, was founded in 1868. Later, the institute operated under the name of Berliner Pfandbriefamt. In 1973, a number of public institutions were incorporated under the name Berliner Pfandbrief-Bank as a public-law institution:

- Stadtschaft der Mark Brandenburg
- Berliner Hypothekenbankverein (Stadtschaft)
- Preußische Zentralstadtschaft
- Brandenburgische Provinzialbank und Girozentrale
- Brandenburgischer Sparkassen- und Giroverband
- Kur- und Neumärkische Ritterschaftliche Darlehens-Kasse, Märkische Landschaft, Preussische Staatsbank

In 1993, the legal form was changed to a Joint-stock company. Since this change, the bank has been operating as Berliner Hypotheken- und Pfandbriefbank AG (short: Berlin Hyp). The sole shareholder was the state of Berlin. In 1994, a predecessor institution of today's Landesbank Berlin took over all shares. The current bank was created in 1996 from the merger of Berliner Hypotheken- und Pfandbriefbank AG and Braunschweig-Hannoversche Hypothekenbank AG.

In November 2009, the Berlin Hyp's Supervisory Board resolved a substantial capital increase by issuing new no-par-value shares in order to broaden the scope of action for new business acquisitions and thereby expand and consolidate its market position.

In October 2013, the company was renamed Berlin Hyp AG. Also, the brand image of the bank was completely revised and has since leaned its business colors and appearance against the image of the Sparkasse, to make the involvement of the Berlin Hyp in the Sparkassen-Finanzgruppe outwardly visible.

As of January 1, 2015, the company's shares were transferred to LBB Holding and the commercial real estate financing business, which had previously been operated jointly with Landesbank Berlin, was dissolved.

The Berlin Hyp is a member of the Verband deutscher Pfandbriefbanken.

== Key figures ==
Key figures	2018	2017	2016	2015	2014	2013	2012	2011	2010	2009	2008	2007	2006	2005	2004	2003	2002	2001
Balance sheet total [in million €]	27.178	27.123	26.354	28.544	30.427	33.367	34.205	38.556	40.738	41.291	41.487	41.198	40.639	39.591	35.688	39.877	43.002	42.996
Operating result [in million €]	220,4	184,4	120,1	126,1	121,9	119,0	202,7	129,8	88,0	78,5	57,5	77,0	74,7	57,7	45,6	13,6	− 51,2	− 92,2
Annual net profit [in million €]	116,4	117,0	73,0	68,1	120,1	125,8	105,4	86,4	58,9	44,7	55,1	54,5	36,7	24,8	4,3	− 80,3	− 92,2	
Cost-Income-Ratio [in %]	45,2	51,2	44,0	46,1	46,1	37,5	35,4	30,7	31,8	35,1	33,0	33,3	33,5	33,5	33,6	30,1	40,9	38,8
Employees	596	585	585	576	544	402	399	419	441	439	426	405	423	421	434	461	481	551

The bank employs 596 people (as of 2018) and has offices in Berlin (headquarters), Düsseldorf, Frankfurt, Hamburg, Munich, Stuttgart and overseas locations in Warsaw, Amsterdam and Paris.

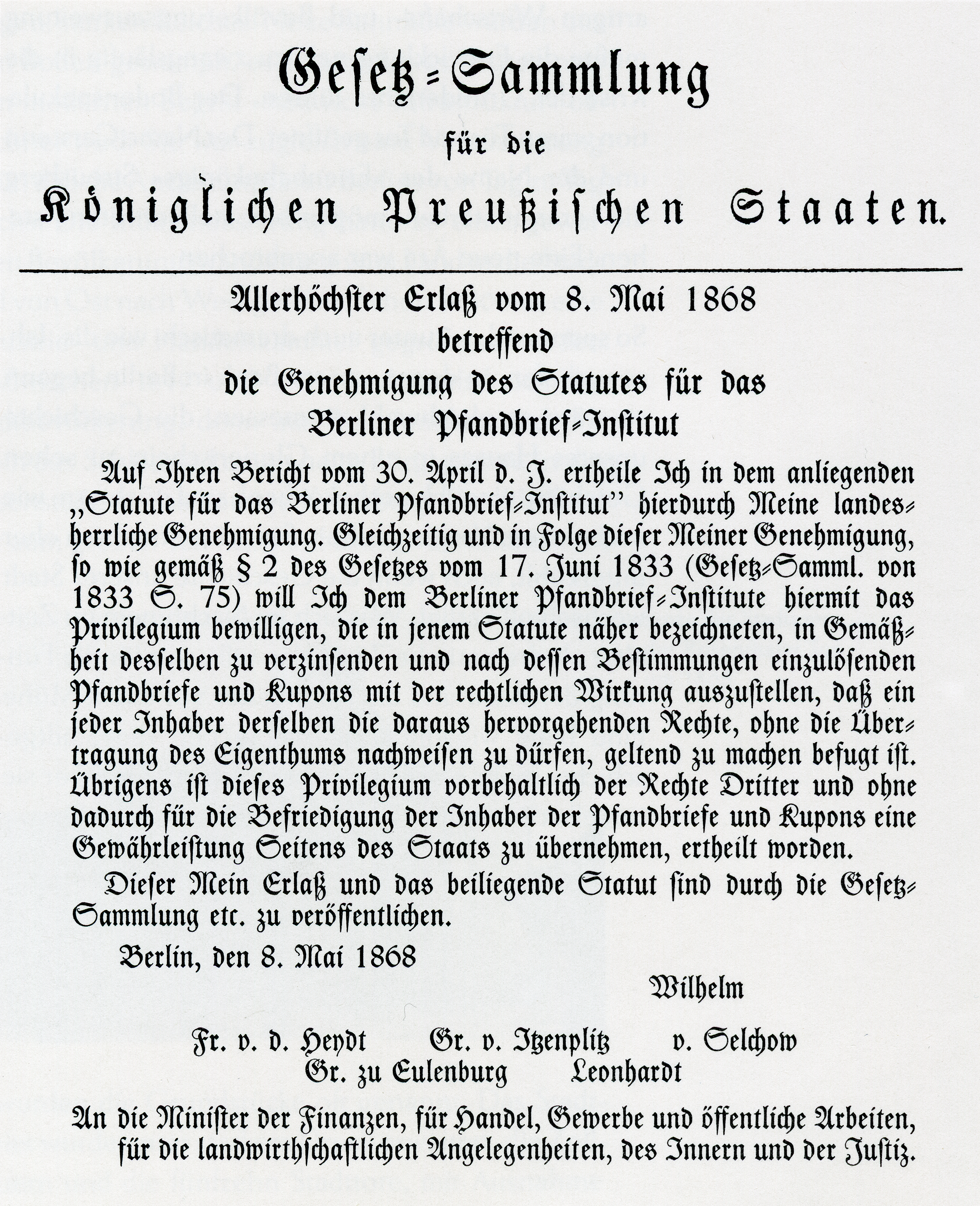
Founding document Berliner Pfandbrief-Institut

== Shareholders ==
Share	Stockholders
100 %	Landesbank Berlin Holding

Status: February 2018

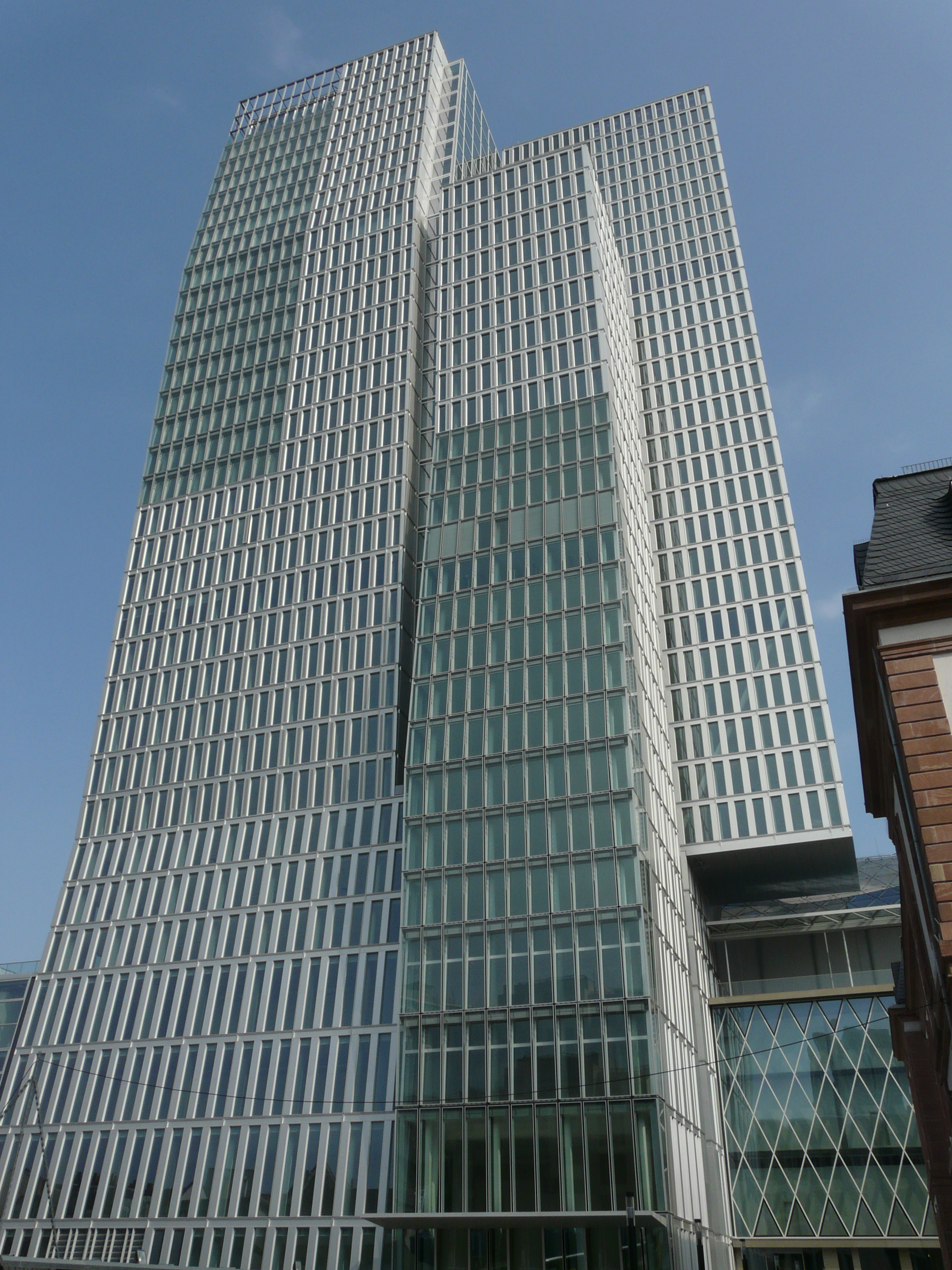
Office in the Nextower in Frankfurt

== Corporate publications ==
The Berlin Hyp regularly publishes real estate studies, some of which are own works and partly in cooperations.

- Logistik und Immobilien 2017
- Trendbarometer 2/2017
- Wohnmarktreport 2018

== Significant investments ==
Since 2008, the Berlin Hyp holds a 100 percent stake in the now-defunct Berlin Hyp Immobilien GmbH. The Berlin Hyp's business purposes were brokerage and real estate marketing.

== Brand and corporate design ==
At the beginning of 2013, the traditional Berliner Immobilienbank was facing a comprehensive strategic repositioning. The starting point for the rebranding was the organizational reorganization of the parent company, Landesbank Berlin (LBB). Berlin Hyp was set up as an independent real estate financier and future subsidiary of Berliner Sparkasse within the Sparkassen-Finanzgruppe. Factors of the reorientation were the now independent market position and the expansion of the range of services as a composite bank in the Sparkassen-Finanzgruppe and for real estate clients.

The slogan of the Berlin Hyp is "partnership is our foundation". The slogan represents a promise of service to its employees, customers, partners and owners. It guides the operation and emphasizes key features of the Berlin Hyp: down-to-earth, reliable, in partnership and personal.

== See also ==
- List of banks in Germany
