= Sparkassen-Finanzgruppe =

Group of German public banks

- Type: Public banking group
- Industry: Financial services
- Founded: 18th century: first Sparkassen; 1884: Deutscher Sparkassenverband; 1924: DSGV; 1975: Institutional Protection Scheme
- Headquarters: Germany
- Key people: Helmut Schleweis, Sparkassenpräsident since 2018
- Products: Retail banking; corporate banking; investment banking; insurance; private banking; private equity; mortgage loans; credit cards; investment management; wealth management; asset management; mutual funds; exchange-traded funds; index funds
- Total assets: ▲€2.492,8 billions (2023)
- Website: sparkasse.de

The Sparkassen-Finanzgruppe ("Savings Banks Financial Group") is a network of public banks that together form the largest financial services group in Germany and Europe by assets. Its name refers to local government-controlled savings banks that are known in German as Sparkasse, plural Sparkassen. Its activity is overwhelmingly located in Germany.

== History ==
The Ersparungsclasse der Allgemeinen Versorgungsanstalt, established in Hamburg in 1778, is widely viewed as the first modern savings bank. Other accounts emphasize the significance of the savings bank of Göttingen, founded in 1801, which was the first established with a municipal guarantor whereas earlier foundations had been initiated by merchants, clerics or academics (Hamburg later created its own municipal savings banks in 1827). In 1838, the Kingdom of Prussia adopted the first savings banks legislation (Sparkassenreglement), which unified the legal status of the 234 savings banks then existing under its jurisdiction and put them under the regime of the respective local governments; it served as a model for other German polities.

Between 1850 and 1903, the idea of the municipal savings banks spread further, and the number of savings banks in Germany increased from 630 to 2834. In 1913, of the 1765 Sparkassen that operated in Prussia alone, about 90 percent belonged to either a city or a county (German: Kreis), while the remaining 10 percent were either private or belonged to an association. Throughout the 19th century, the services that Sparkassen could provide had been strictly restricted, but these restrictions were loosened as joint-stock banks, starting with Deutsche Bank, started competing for the collection of retail savings. In 1909, new legislation allowed the Sparkassen to offer checking and related payment accounts. This change fostered the creation of regional public entities that cleared payments between different Sparkassen, known as Girozentralen. The first Girozentrale was established in 1909 in Saxony, soon followed by those for Bavaria (1914), the Rhineland (1914), Thuringia (1915), Silesia (1916), and from 1916, the national Deutscher Zentral-Giroverband which in 1918 became the Deutsche Girozentrale (DGZ).

Also during World War I, the Imperial German government leveraged the network of Sparkassen to place war bonds, marking the beginning of their activity in the securities space. In 1921, further legislative changes enabled them to underwrite and sell securities more broadly, thus allowing them to act practically as universal banks. The Sparkassen, however, were severely impacted by hyperinflation: their deposit base shrunk from nearly 32 billion marks in late 1918 (up from 19 billion in 1913) to a mere 608 million Reichsmarks at end-1924.

In 1934, all savings banks were designated as credit institutions under new banking legislation following the crisis of 1931. The savings banks group, designated from 1935 as Wirtschaftsgruppe Sparkassen, again participated in war financing before and during World War II. The savings banks in East Germany were nationalized and separated from the rest of the network in 1945, but reintegrated into it after German reunification in 1990.

== Key concepts ==
The Sparkassen-Finanzgruppe is highly idiosyncratic, and its description requires understanding of key notions that are unique to its German context.

=== Träger ===
In the context of the Sparkassen-Finanzgruppe, the German word Träger ("holder") refers to the owner-like relationship between a local government and a public-sector institution (German: Anstalt des öffentlichen Rechts), i.e. the Sparkasse. Examples of such local govern entities are municipality (German: Gemeinde), union of municipalities (Gemeindeverband) or district (German: Kreis, Landkreis, kreisfreie Stadt or Stadtkreis)).

Träger implies a form of control that is not legally considered ownership, but it is functionally similar to ownership. This is because Sparkasse is an independent public entity, but the Träger holds governance rights that resemble ownership. As a result, most Sparkassen are overseen by locally elected politicians. The Träger position (German: Trägerschaft) cannot be sold, and it does not grant rights to the Sparkasse's financial surplus, which is typically retained or used for local public welfare projects.

Until the early 21st century, the Träger also provided explicit financial guarantees to the institutions they controlled, but these guarantees were mostly phased out under an agreement concluded on 17 July 2001 between a group of German negotiators and the European Commission represented by Competition Commissioner Mario Monti, known in German as the Brüsseler Konkordanz.

=== Regional principle ===
The Regional Principle (German: Regionalprinzip) stipulates that entities of the Sparkassen-Finanzgruppe such as Sparkassen or public insurers have a local monopoly within the group within the geographical area in which they are established, namely the territory of their Träger. It is established in the Sparkassen legislation (German: Sparkassengesetz, German acronym SpkG) which is specific to each of the states of Germany (German: Länder) except Hamburg, which has no SpkG. The states of Hesse and Schleswig-Holstein have less restrictive legislation on the Regional Principle than the other German Länder, linked to the fact that, as in Hamburg, they have Sparkassen under the legal-form of joint-stock companies (Aktiengesellschaft) as opposed to public-sector entities.

== Group entities ==
In late 2020, the Sparkassen-Finanzgruppe included 520 member entities, as described in its 2021 Annual Report:

- 376 local savings banks (German: Sparkassen): 200,676 employees
- 6 regional banking groups (German: Landesbank, including Landesbank Berlin which is directly owned by the DSGV): 33,502 employees
- 9 public insurance groups (German: Öffentlicher Versicherer): 26,680 employees
- 8 regional building societies (German: Landesbausparkasse, abbreviated as LBS; sometimes translated into English as "building and loan associations") and 7 LBS real estate companies: 7,392 employees
- DekaBank (asset management and wholesale financial services): 4,711 employees
- Finanz Informatik (IT services): 4,474 employees
- Deutsche Leasing and other leasing companies: 3,441 employees
- DSV-Gruppe (publishing and other group services): 2,100 employees
- Berlin Hyp (property lending): 593 employees
- S-Kreditpartner (car loans and consumer credit): 530 employees
- 3 factoring companies: 403 employees
- Sparkassen Rating und Risikosysteme GmbH (risk management): 311 employees
- SIZ GmbH (IT security): 281 employees
- 51 capital investment companies: 179 employees

=== National and regional associations ===
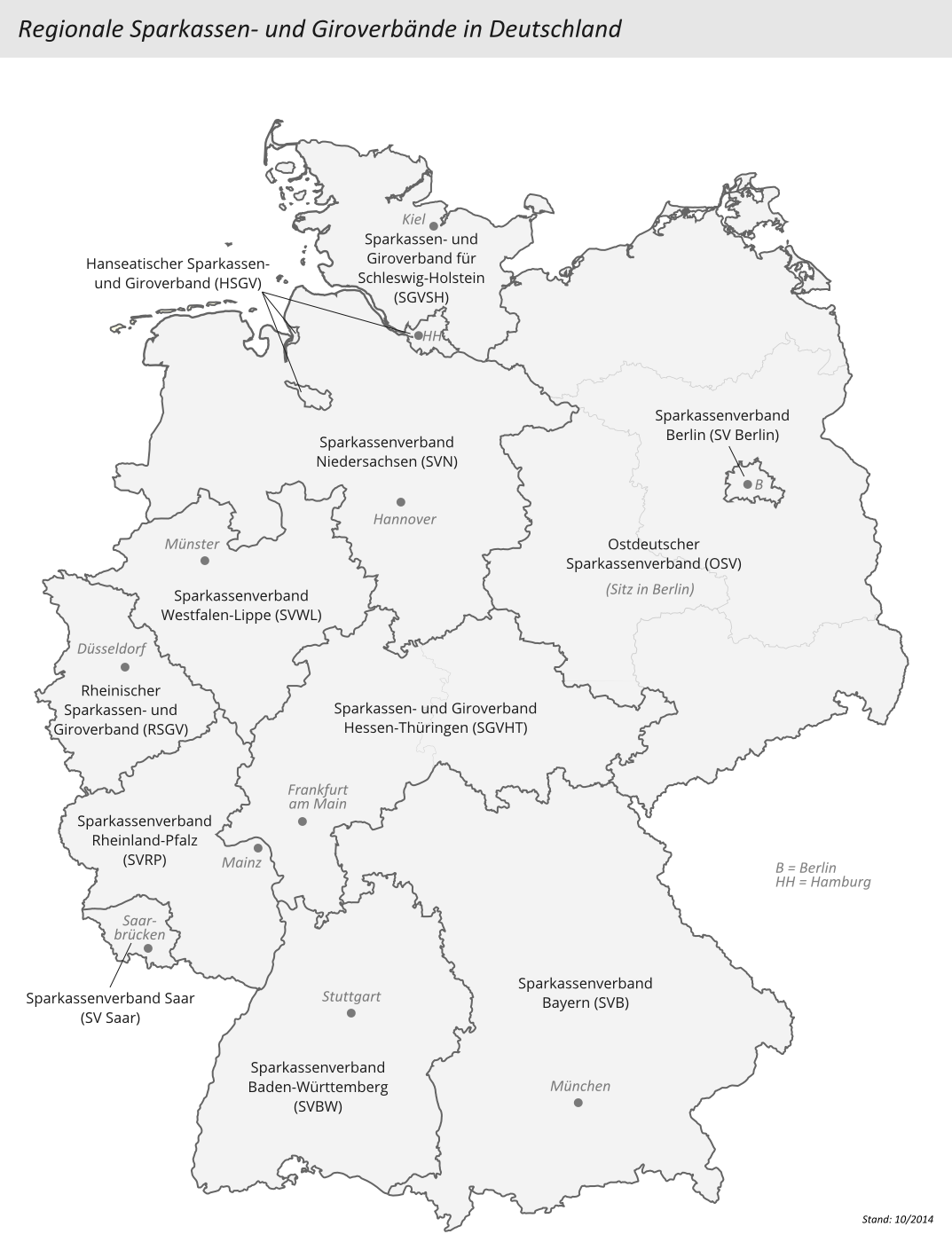
Coverage map of the regional Sparkassenverbände

The Deutscher Sparkassen- und Giroverband (DSGV, self-translated as "German Savings Banks Association") is a nonprofit association, based in Berlin and founded in 1924. It operates as an umbrella organization to facilitate decision-making processes, coordinate strategy, and represent its members' political and regulatory interests at the national and international levels.

The 12 regional associations (German: Sparkassenverbände) are statutory bodies, of which savings banks Träger are statutory members. They are responsible for coordination between savings banks in a region, and manage the regional sub-funds that participate in the Sparkassen-Finanzgruppe's institutional protection scheme (except in Berlin where a special arrangement is in place). They also act as auditors and operate regional savings bank academies for educational and training purposes.

They are, from north to south:

- Sparkassen- und Giroverband für Schleswig-Holstein with head office in Kiel, covering Schleswig-Holstein;
- Hanseatischer Sparkassen- und Giroverband in Hamburg, covering Bremen and Hamburg;
- Sparkassenverband Berlin in Berlin, covering Berlin;
- Ostdeutscher Sparkassenverband also in Berlin, covering Brandenburg, Mecklenburg-Vorpommern, Saxony, and Saxony-Anhalt;
- Sparkassenverband Niedersachsen in Hanover, covering Lower Saxony;
- Sparkassenverband Westfalen-Lippe in Münster, covering the northeastern part of North Rhine-Westphalia;
- Rheinischer Sparkassen- und Giroverband in Düsseldorf, covering the southwestern part of North Rhine-Westphalia;
- Sparkassen- und Giroverband Hessen-Thüringen in Frankfurt and Erfurt, covering Hesse and Thuringia;
- Sparkassenverband Rheinland-Pfalz in Mainz, covering Rhineland-Palatinate;
- Sparkassenverband Saar in Saarbrücken, covering Saarland;
- Sparkassenverband Baden-Württemberg in Stuttgart, covering Baden-Württemberg;
- Sparkassenverband Bayern in Munich, covering Bavaria.

In addition, a dedicated association, the Verband der Freien Sparkassen (VFS), exists for Sparkassen that are (or recently were) joint-stock companies. The latter are members of both the respective regional Sparkassenverband and the VFS.

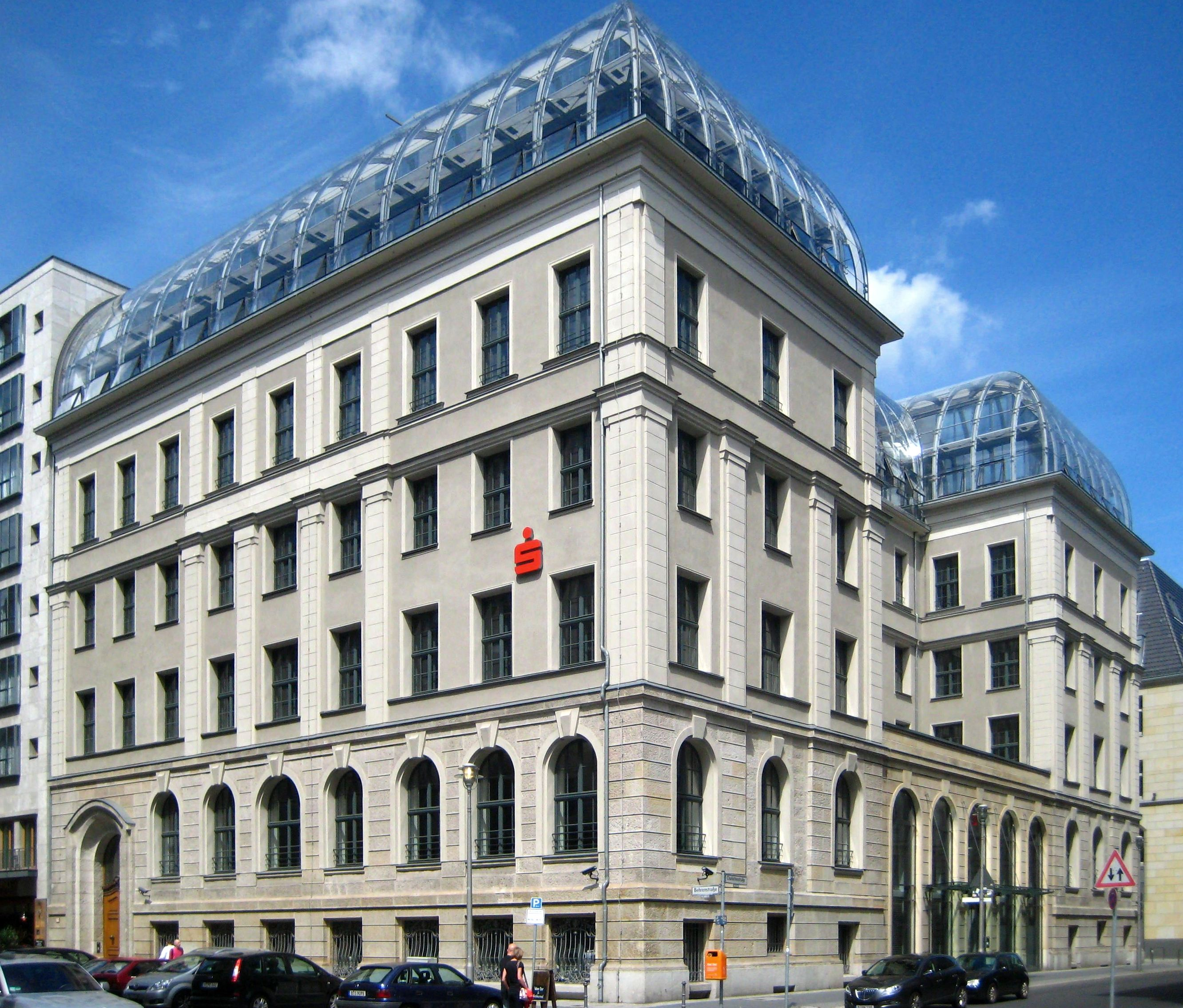
DSGV head office in Berlin

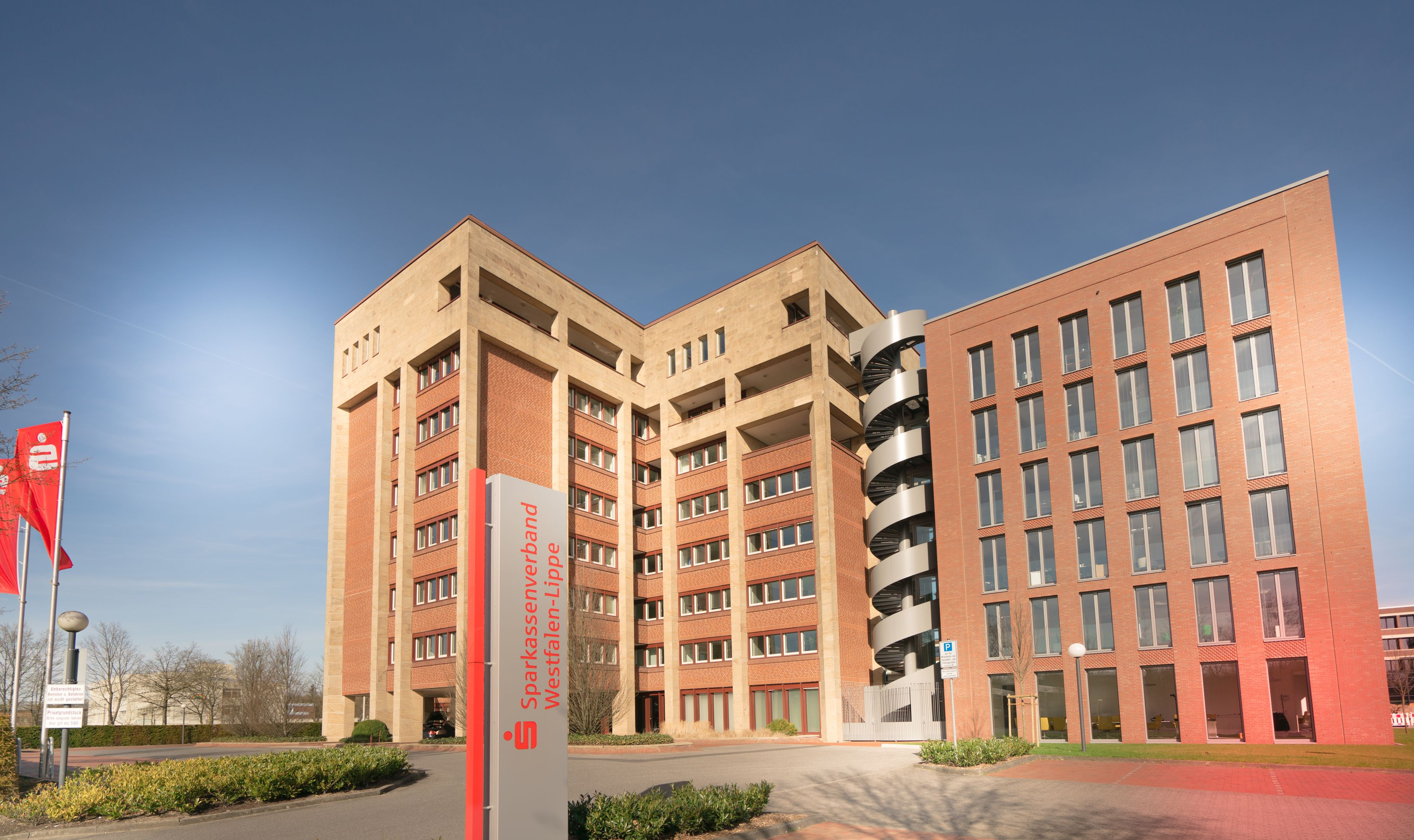
Sparkassenverband Westfalen-Lippe head office in Münster

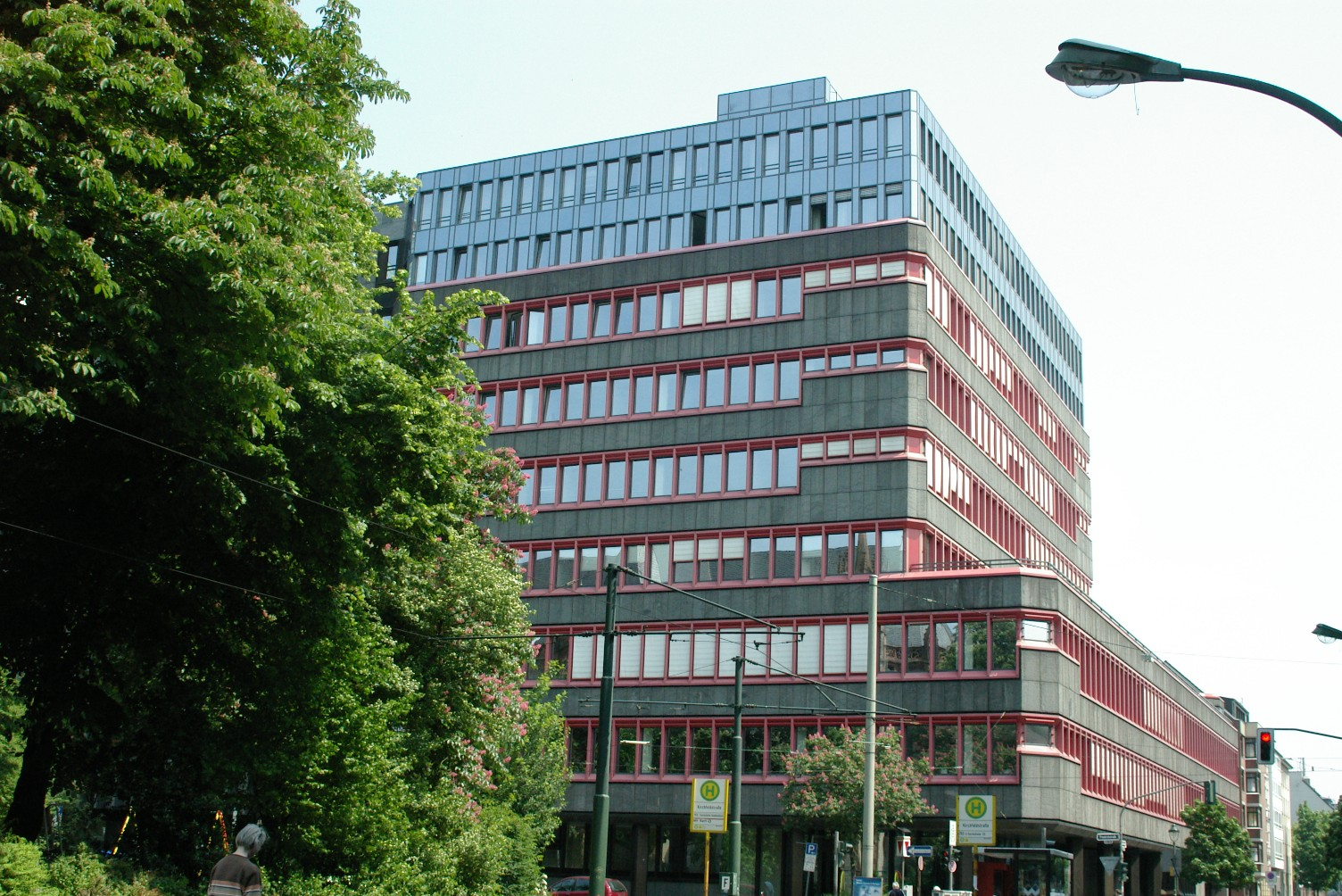
Rheinischer Sparkassen- und Giroverband head office in Düsseldorf

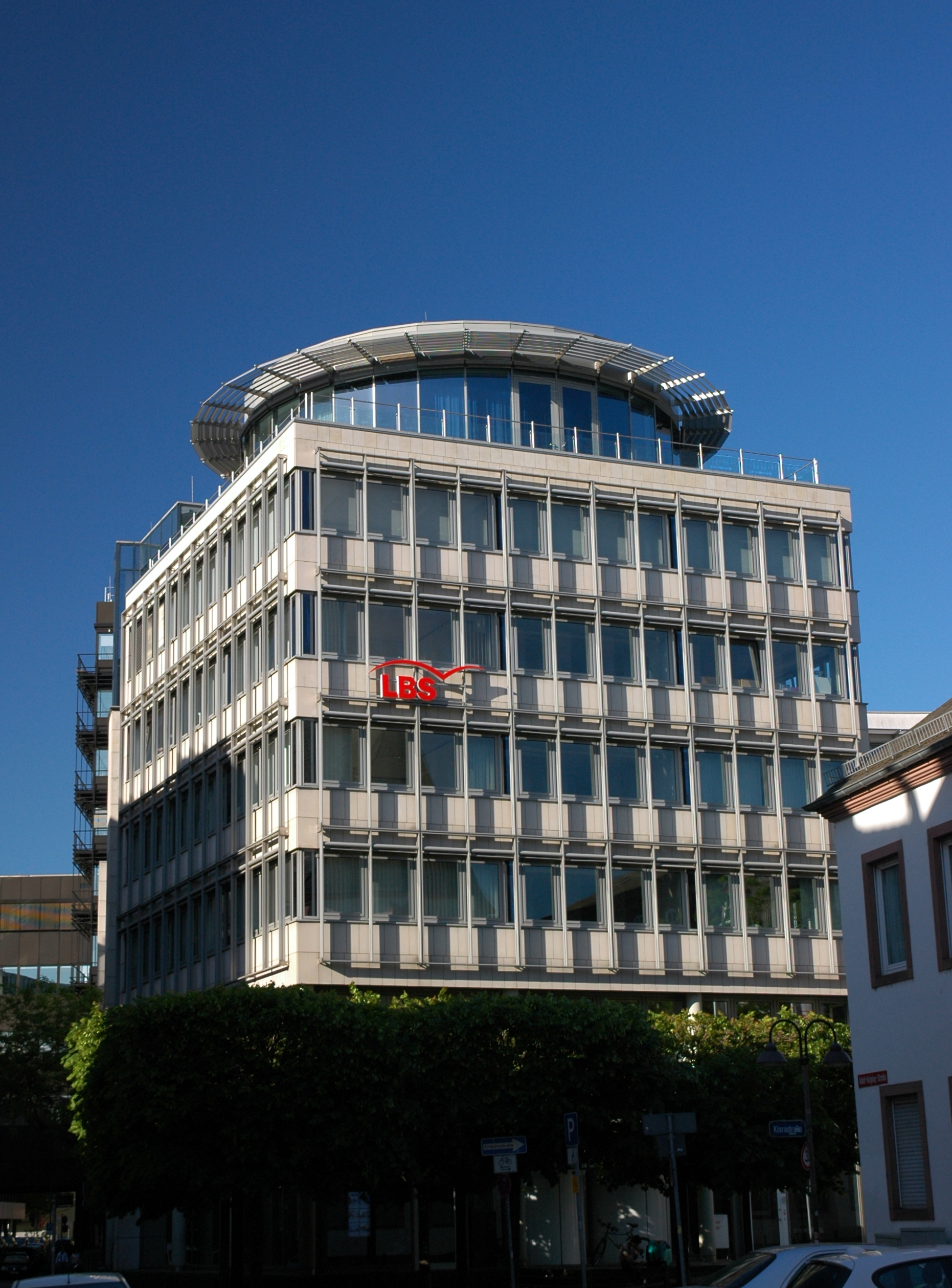
Sparkassenverband Rheinland-Pfalz head office in Mainz

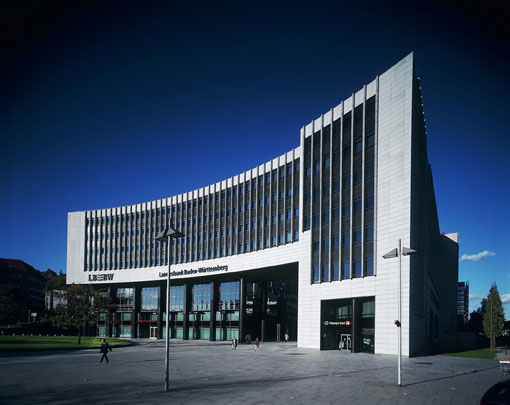
LBBW building in Stuttgart, hosting the head office of Sparkassenverband Baden-Württemberg

=== Sparkassen ===
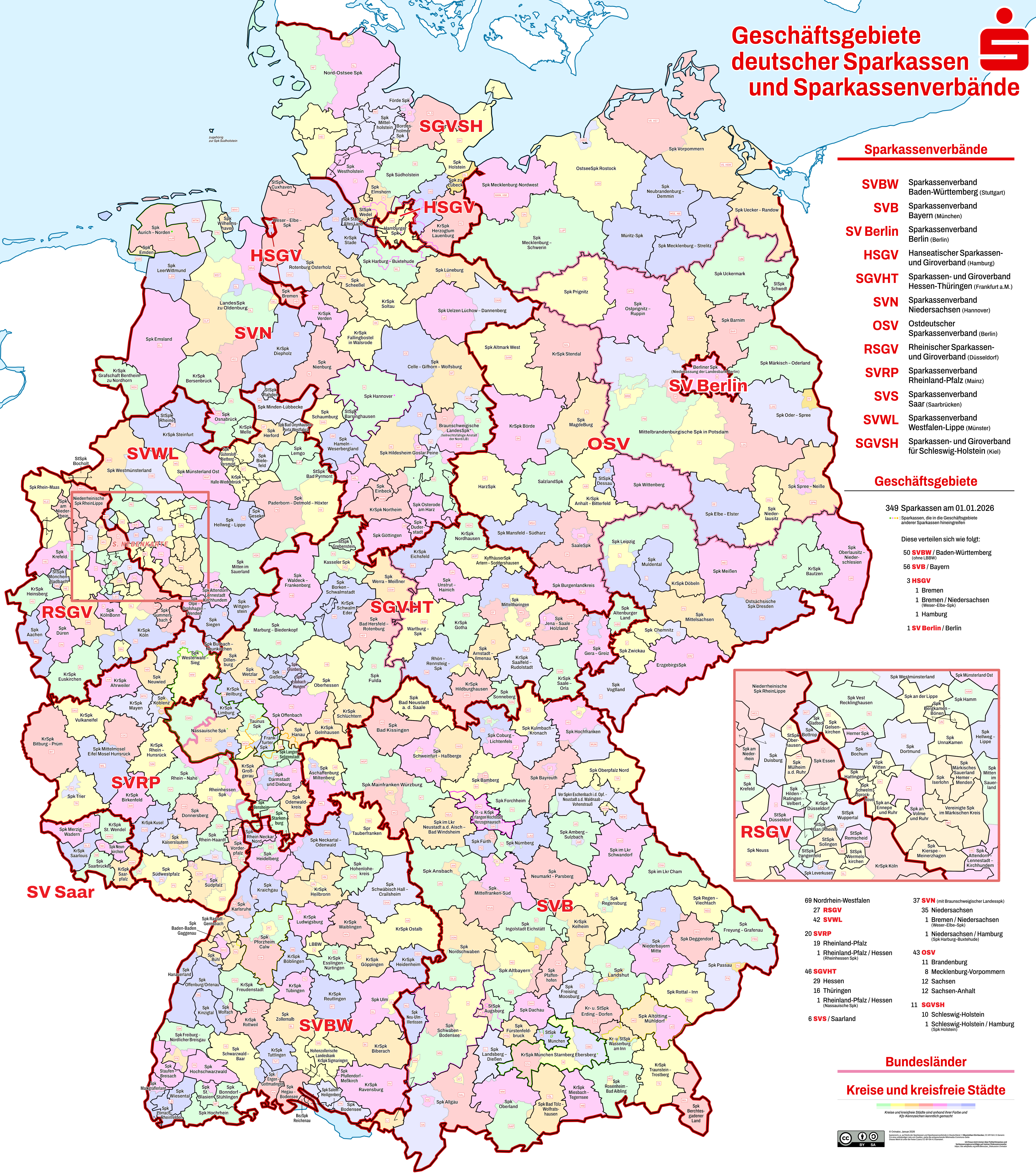
Saving banks coverage in Germany

The Sparkassen work as commercial banks in a decentralized structure. Each savings bank is independent, locally managed and concentrates its business activities on customers in the territory in which it is situated under the Regional Principle. In general, Sparkassen are not profit oriented. The Träger of the savings banks are usually single municipalities or several municipalities within a district.

As banks under public law, the vast majority of Sparkassen have a public mandate which requires that they serve their local stakeholders and local communities. Five institutions known as "free Sparkassen" (German: freie Sparkassen) are or recently were joint-stock companies. They are: Bordesholmer Sparkasse, Sparkasse Bremen, Hamburger Sparkasse, Sparkasse zu Lübeck, and Sparkasse Mittelholstein. Their Träger are charitable foundations. They are members of the VFS, as is Sparkasse Westholstein despite its current public-sector legal status.

Fulfilling public interests is still one of the most significant characteristics of public banks in general and the savings banks in particular. Although public interest is very unspecific, objects of those companies are usually:

- providing financial and monetary services in economically underdeveloped regions;
- supporting saving processes and accumulation of capital;
- strengthening competition in the banking industry.

The total assets of the Sparkassen amount to about €1 trillion. The 431 savings banks operate a network of over 15,600 branches and offices and employ over 250,000 people. Savings banks are universal banks and provide the whole spectrum of banking services for private and commercial medium-sized customers. 50 million customers maintain business activities with savings banks. Although independent and regionally spread, the savings banks act as one unit under the brand Sparkasse with its iconic logo and recognizable red hue.

The size of savings banks differs widely depending on the economy in their region. While the biggest, Hamburger Sparkasse, had total assets of €37.7 billion and 5,500 employees in 2009, the smallest (Stadtsparkasse Bad Sachsa) had only €129.6 million in assets and 45 employees.

=== Landesbanken ===
Landesbanken coverage map in Germany

The Landesbanken are mostly owned by the regional savings banks through its regional association and the respective federal states. In total, the assets of the Landesbanks have shrunk by 45 percent, or more than €702 billion, between end-2008 and end-2017.

The Landesbanks have traditionally acted as central financial services providers for regional savings bank association and as the "main bank" of the respective Länder. They are also local banks, mortgage banks and general commercial banks. Their duties and powers are codified in the individual banking laws of the Länder (Landesbankengesetze). The specific tasks for the savings banks include central clearing for cashless payments and liquidity funding for the regional savings banks. They also provide many services for the savings banks in the region in securities and cross-country businesses. In contrast to savings banks, they do wholesale banking rather than retail banking.

After multiple mergers and restructurings, five Landesbanken operated in Germany as of late 2022:

- Landesbank Baden-Württemberg (LBBW) in Stuttgart
  - covers Baden-Württemberg, Rhineland-Palatinate, and Saxony
  - owned by the State of Baden-Württemberg (40.53 percent), the regional Sparkassenverband (40.53 percent), and the City of Stuttgart (18.93 percent)
- Bayerische Landesbank (BayernLB) in Munich
  - covers Bavaria
  - owned by the Free State of Bavaria (75 percent minus one share) and the Bavarian Sparkassenverband (25 percent plus one share)
- Landesbank Hessen-Thüringen (Helaba) in Frankfurt and Erfurt
  - covers Brandenburg, Hesse, North Rhine-Westphalia, and Thuringia
  - owned by the Sparkassenverband of Hesse and Thuringia (68,85 percent), the State of Hesse (8,10 percent), the Rhenish Sparkassenverband, Sparkassenverband Westphalia-Lippe, FIDES Alpha, and FIDES Beta (4.75 percent each), and the Free State of Thuringia (4,05 percent)
- Norddeutsche Landesbank (NORD/LB) in Hanover
  - covers Bremen, Hamburg, Lower Saxony, Mecklenburg-Vorpommern, Saxony-Anhalt, and Schleswig-Holstein
  - owned by the State of Lower Saxony (56.76 percent), FIDES Gamma and FIDES Delta (12.27 percent each), the Sparkassenverband of Lower Saxony (9.16 percent), the State of Saxony-Anhalt (6.42 percent), and holding entities of the Sparkassen in Saxony-Anhalt and Mecklenburg-Vorpommern (1.83 percent and 1.27 percent respectively)
- Landesbank Saar (SaarLB) in Saarbrücken
  - covers Saarland
  - owned by the State of Saarland (74.90 percent) and the regional Sparkassenverband (25.10 percent)

FIDES Alpha and Gamma are trustee entities for the regional sub-funds of the Sparkassenverbände within the Institutional Protection Scheme (IPS) under the DSGV, and FIDES Beta and Delta are trustees for the sub-fund of the Landesbanken in the IPS.

Landesbank Berlin (LBB) does not belong in the same category as it was converted into a joint-stock company (German: Aktiengesellschaft) in 2007, when the DSGV rescued it and took full ownership through two of its legal entities, Erwerbsgesellschaft der S-Finanzgruppe mbH & Co. KG (owning 89.37 percent) and Beteiligungsgesellschaft der S-Finanzgruppe mbH & Co. KG (owning 10,63 percent).

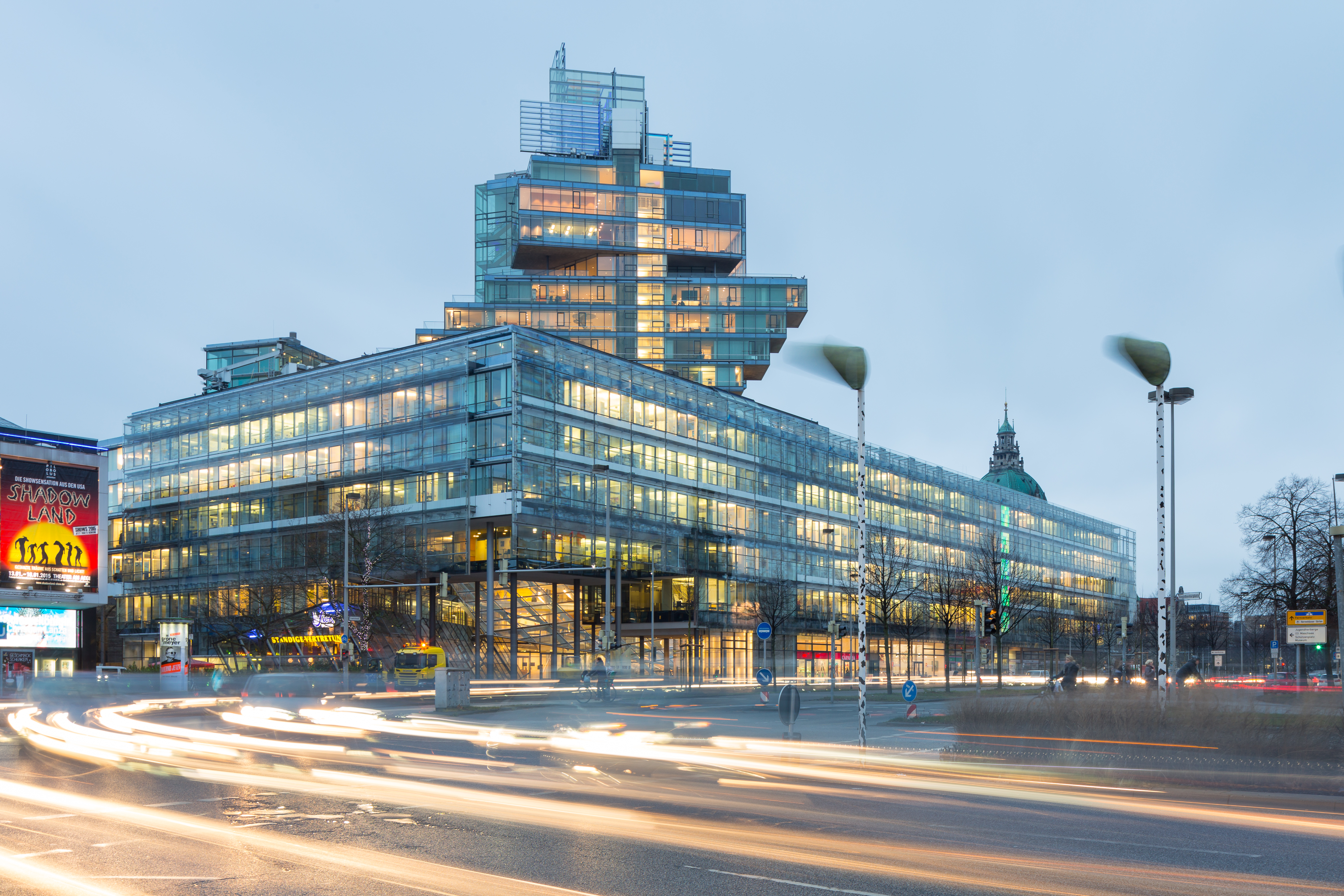
NordLB head office in Hanover

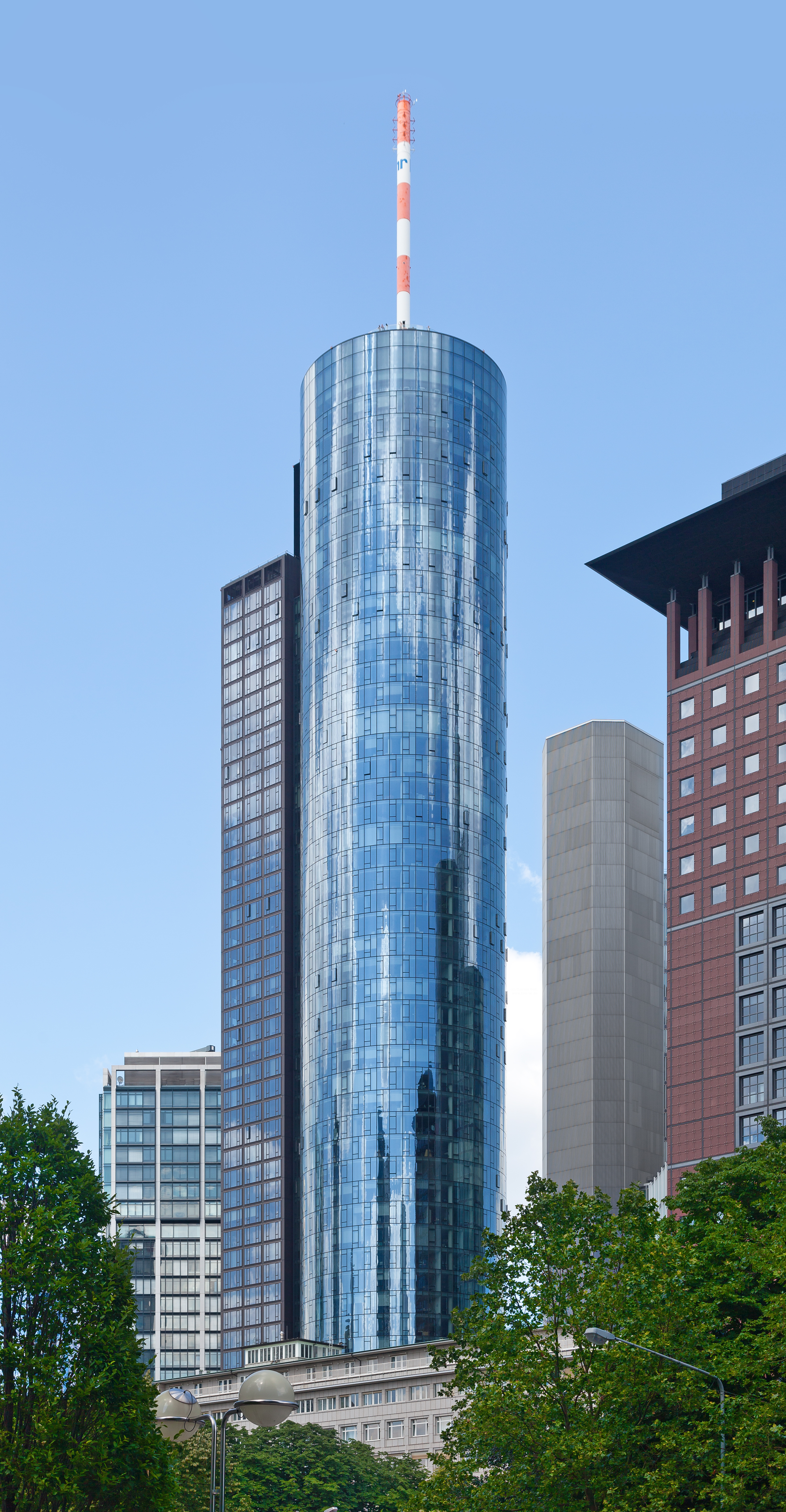
Helaba head office in frankfurt

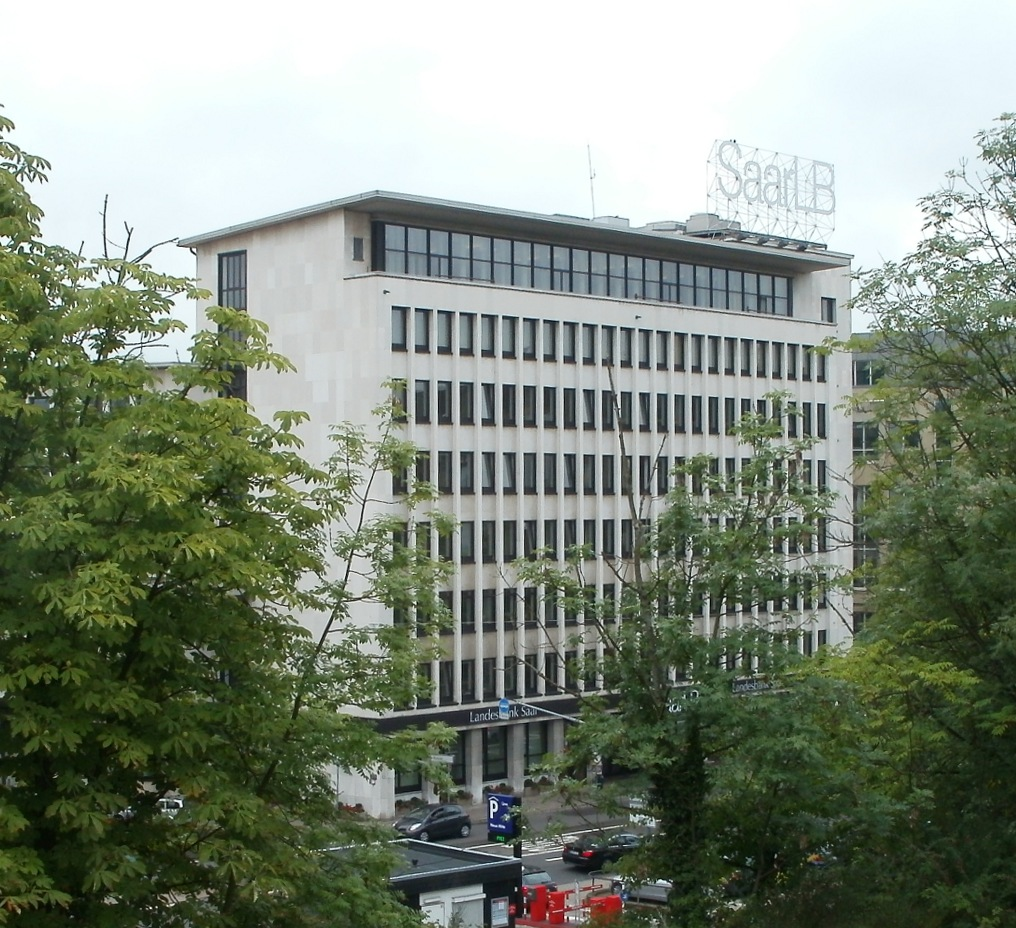
SaarLB head office in Saarbrücken

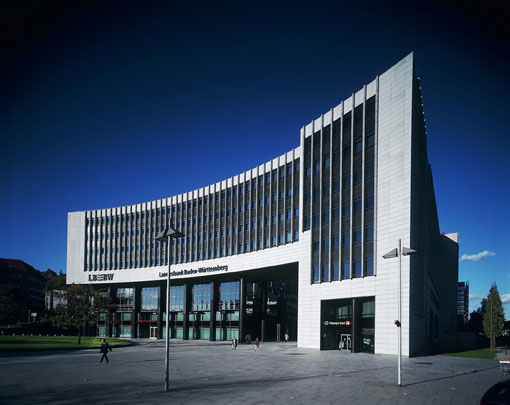
LBBW head office in Stuttgart

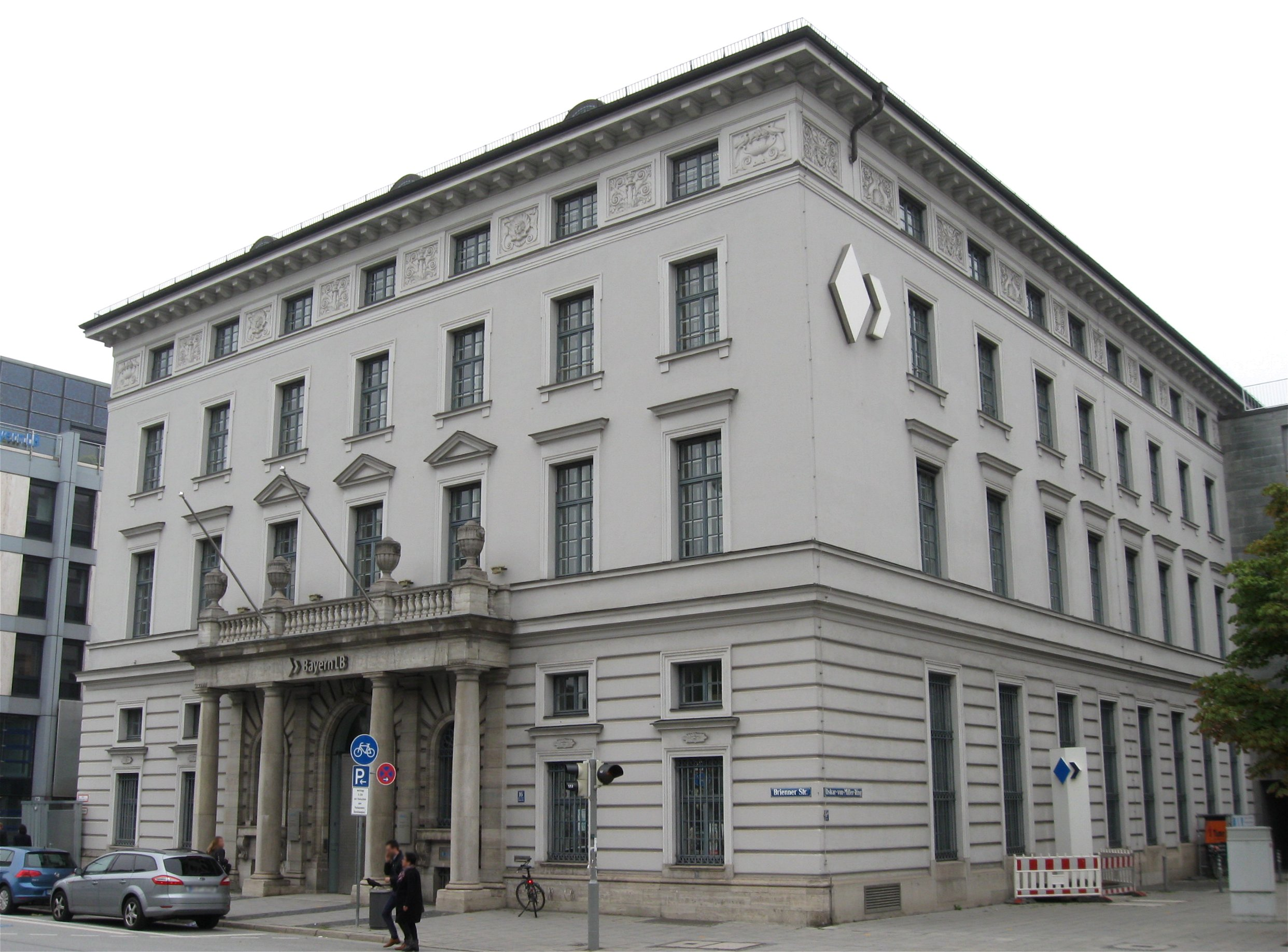
BayernLB head office in Munich

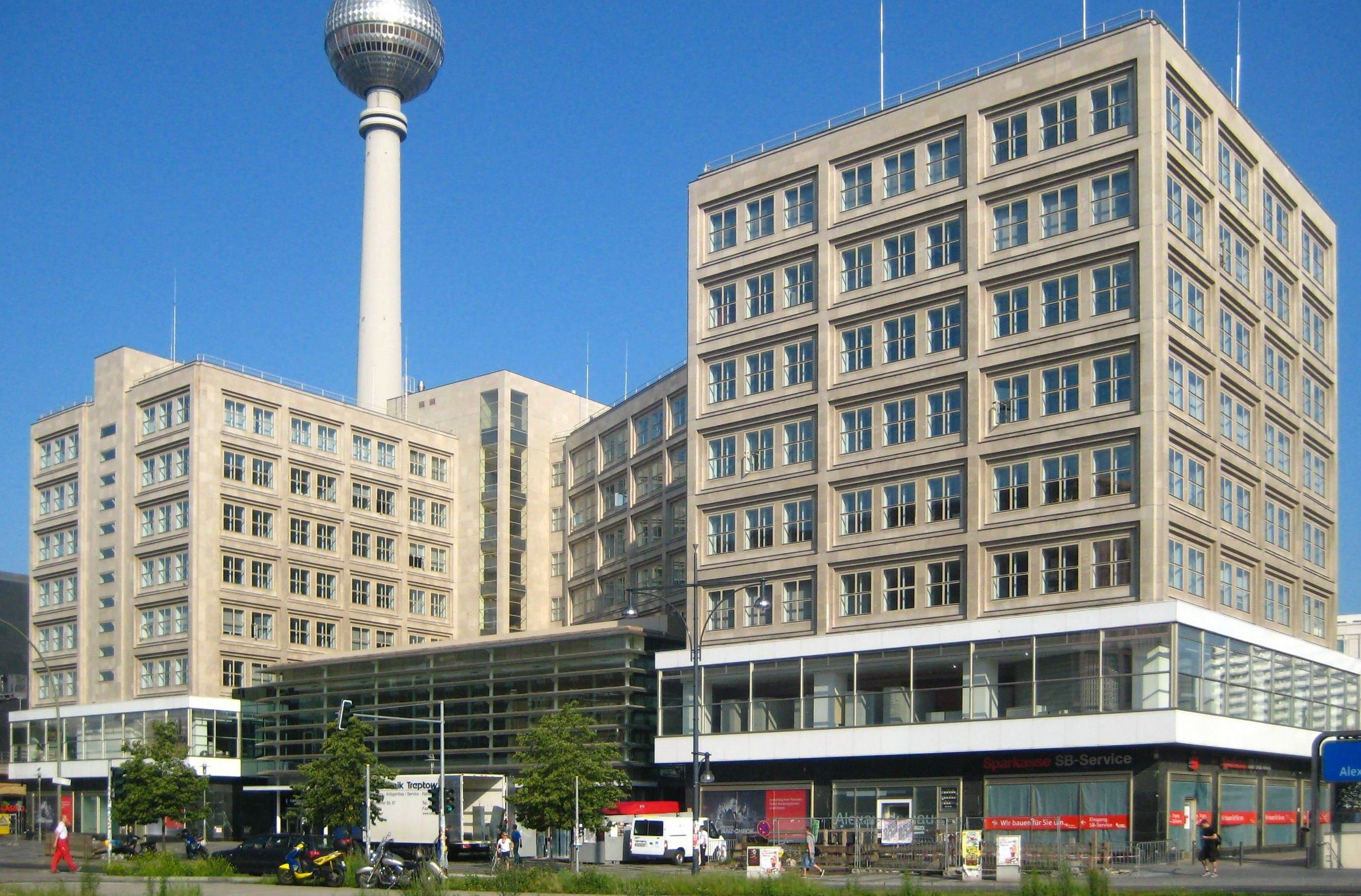
Landesbank Berlin head office in Berlin

=== Public insurers ===
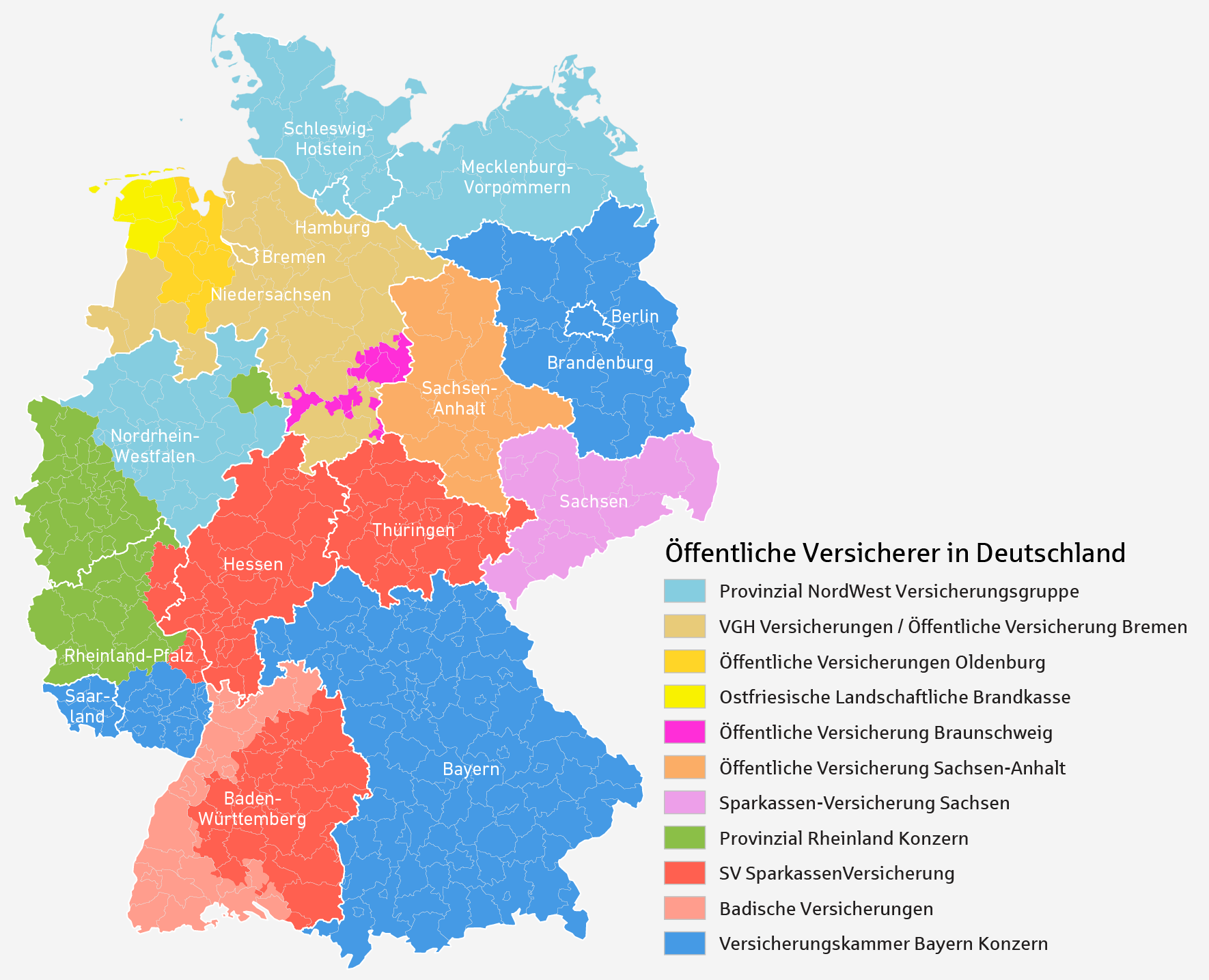
Public insurers coverage map in Germany

The nine public insurers that belong to the Sparkassen-Finanzgruppe are:

- Versicherungskammer Bayern (est. 1811 as General Brandversicherungsanstalt in Munich): Bavaria, Berlin, Brandenburg, south of Rhineland-Palatinate, Saarland
- Provinzial (Versicherung) (est. 1676 as Hamburger Feuerkasse): North Rhine-Westphalia, most of Rhineland-Palatinate, Schleswig-Holstein, Hamburg, Mecklemburg-Vorpommern
- SV Sparkassenversicherung Holding (est. 1758 as Brand-Assecurations-Societät in Karlsruhe: Baden-Württemberg, Hesse, Thuringia, eastern fringe of Rhineland-Palatinate
- VGH Versicherungen (est. 1750 as Landschaftliche Brandkasse Hannover): most of Lower Saxony, Bremen
- Sparkassen-Versicherung Sachsen (est. 1992 in Dresden: Saxony
- Öffentliche Versicherung Braunschweig (est. 1754 as Braunschweigische Landesbrandversicherungsanstalt): parts of southern Lower Saxony
- BGV / Badische Versicherungen (est. 1923 in Karlsruhe): west of Baden-Württemberg
- Öffentliche Versicherungen Oldenburg (est. 1764 as Oldenburgischen Landesbrandkasse): parts of western Lower Saxony
- Ostfriesische Landschaftliche Brandkasse (est. 1754 as Feuersozietät für die ostfriesischen Städte und Flecken): parts of western Lower Saxony
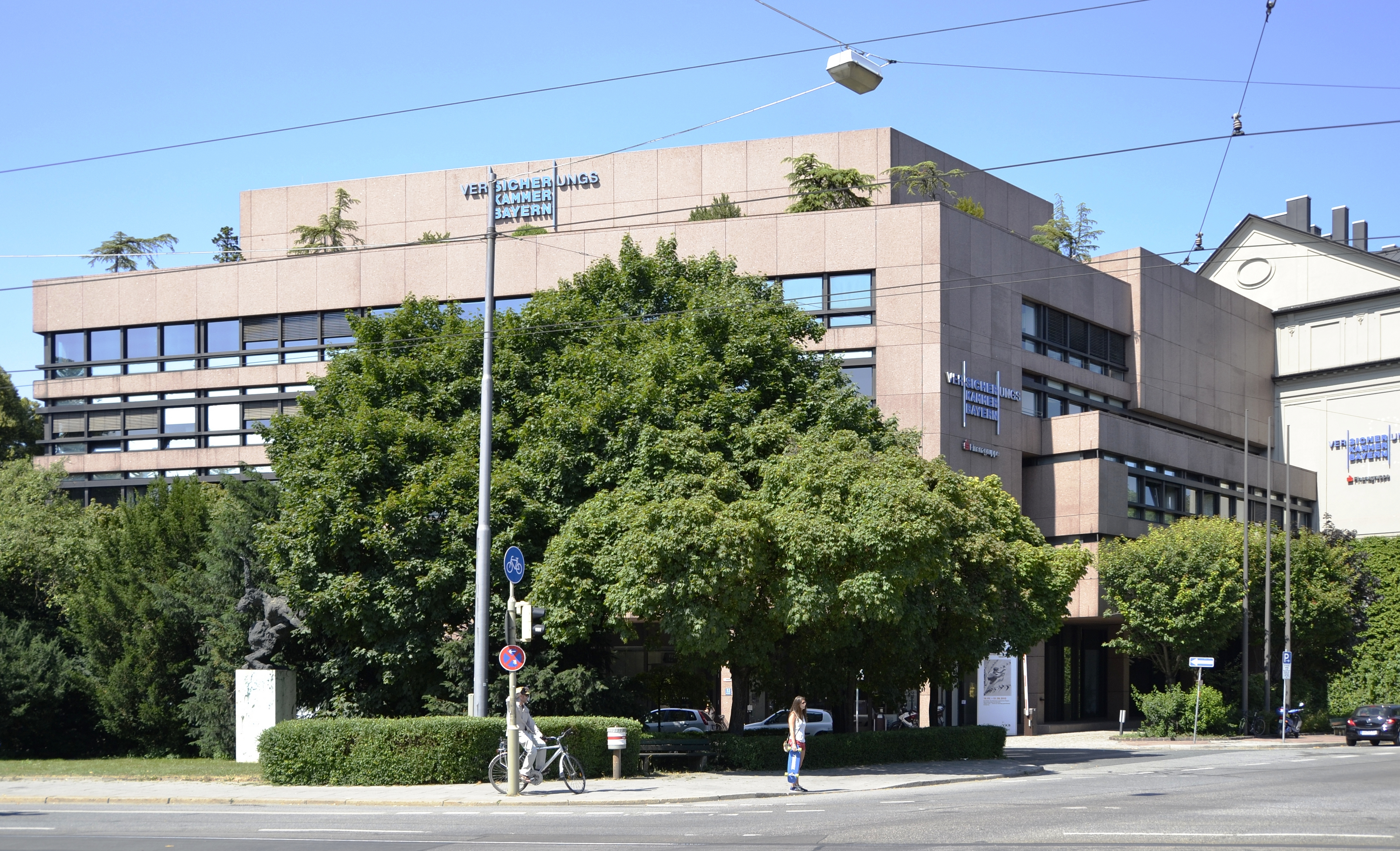
Head office of Versicherungskammer Bayern in Munich

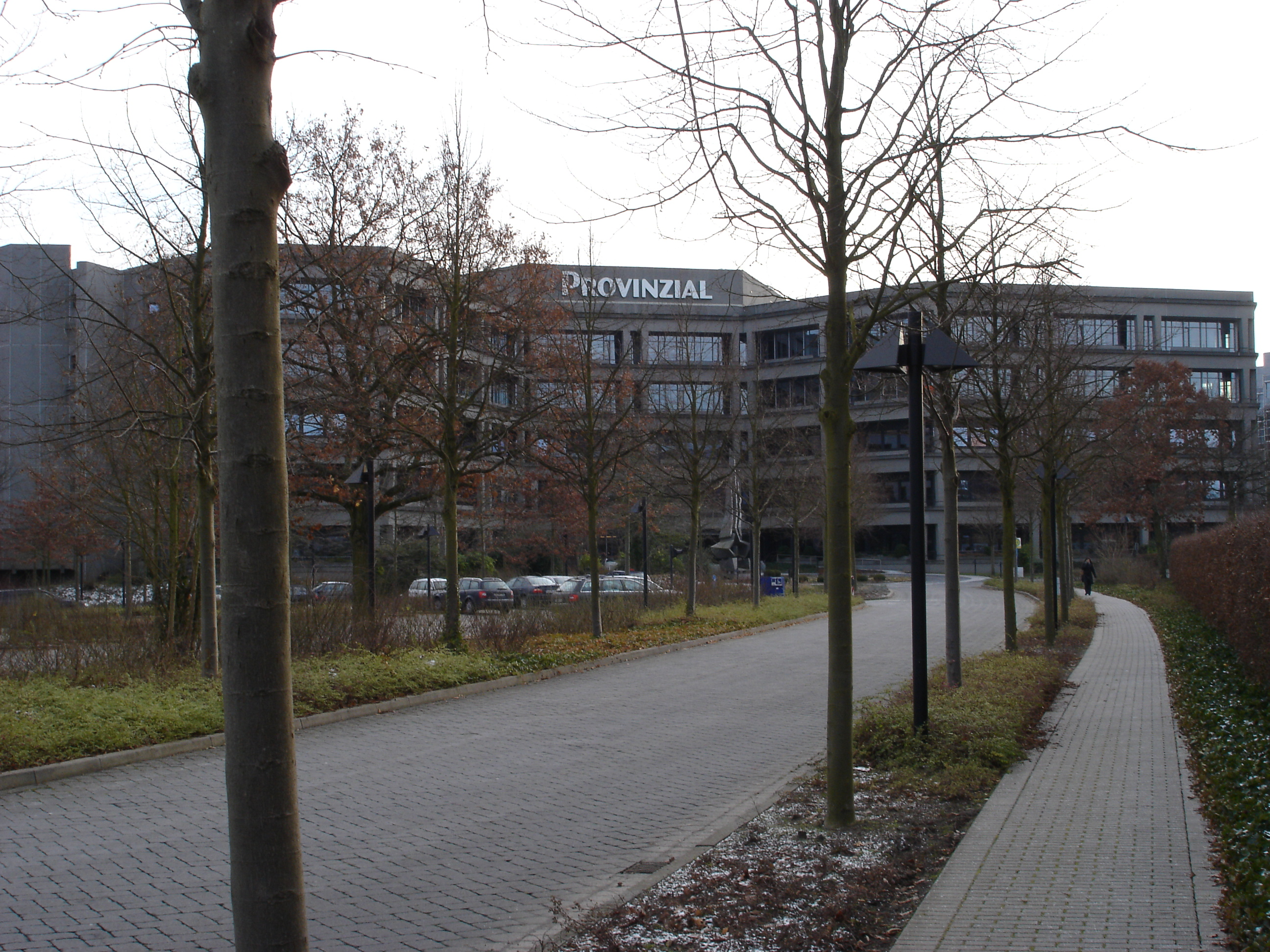
Head office of Provinzial in Münster

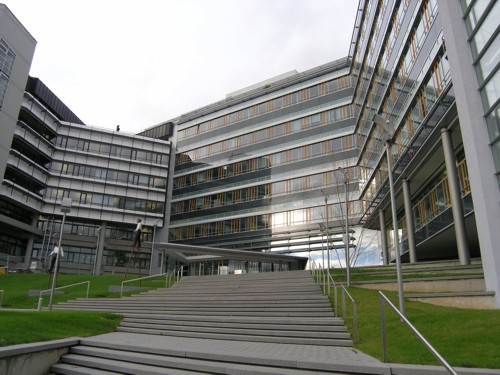
Head office of SV Sparkassenversicherung in Stuttgart

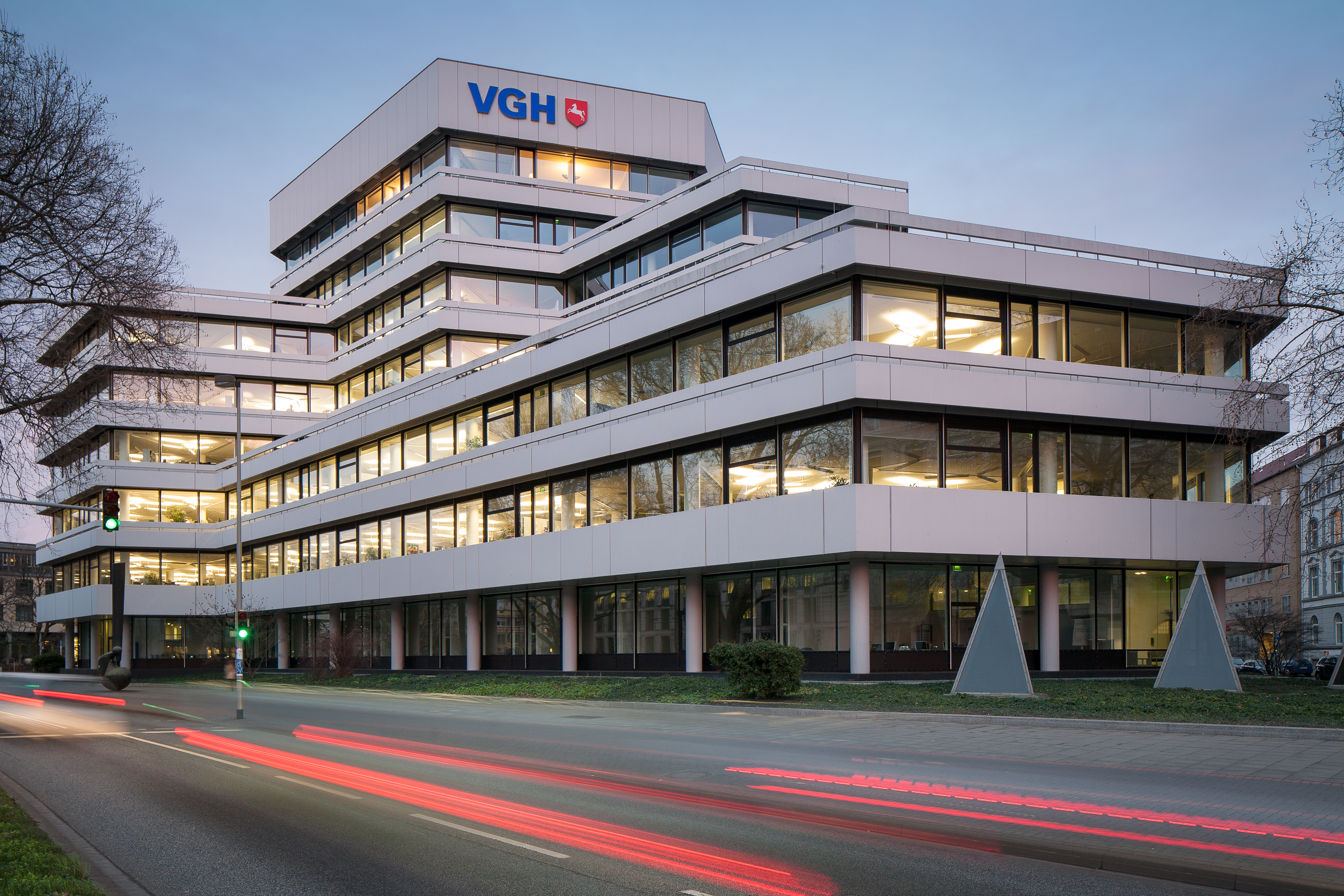
Head office of VGH Versicherungen in Hanover

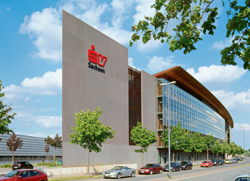
Head office of Sparkassen-Versicherung Sachsen in Dresden

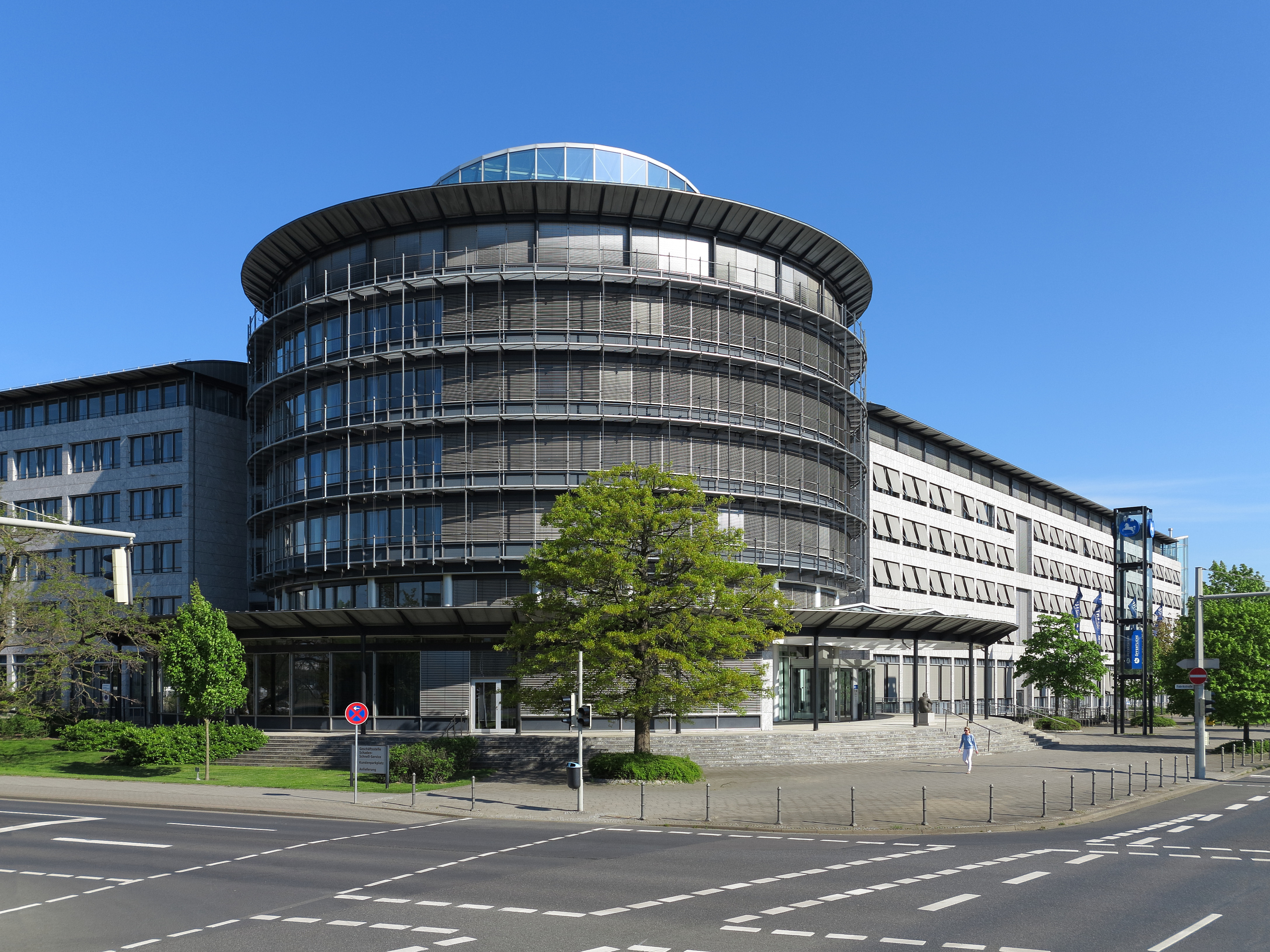
Head office of Öffentliche Versicherung in Braunschweig

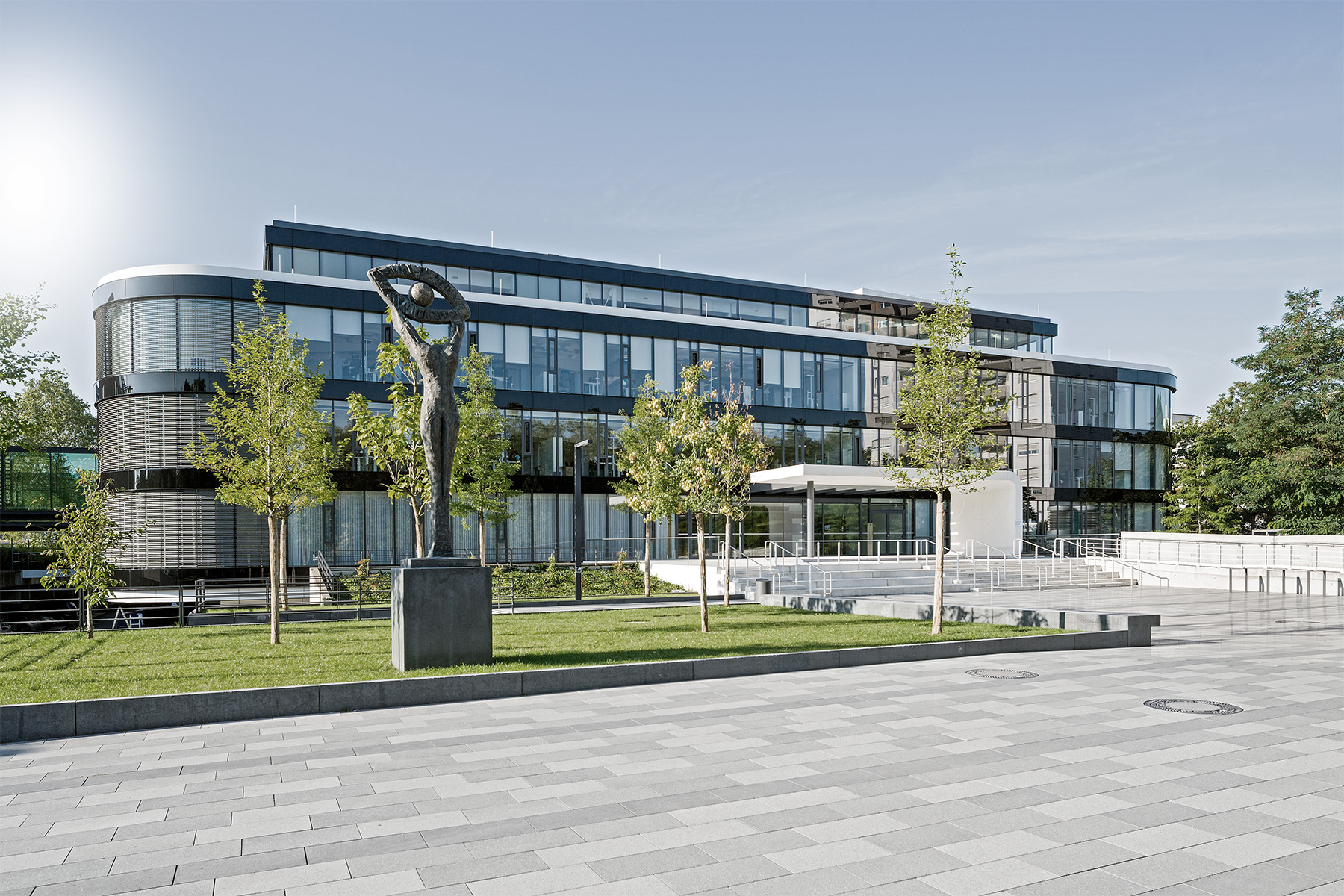
Head office of BGV / Badische Versicherungen in Karlsruhe

=== Landesbausparkassen ===
The core business of the eight Landesbausparkassen ("Land-level building savings banks") is collective real estate saving products (Bausparen) and low-interest residential mortgage loans, with a share of the German mortgage market of about one-third and cumulative assets of €74.5 billion.. As of 2022 they were, from north to south:

- Bausparkasse Schleswig-Holstein-Hamburg AG in Hamburg, covering Hamburg and Schleswig-Holstein
- Ostdeutsche Landesbausparkasse AG (LBS Ost) in Potsdam, covering Brandenburg, Mecklenburg-Vorpommern, Saxony, Saxony-Anhalt, and the eastern part of Berlin
- Norddeutsche Landesbausparkasse Berlin – Hannover (LBS Nord) in Hanover, covering Berlin and Lower Saxony
- Westdeutsche Landesbausparkasse (LBS West) in Münster, covering Bremen and North Rhine-Westphalia
- Landesbausparkasse Hessen-Thüringen in Frankfurt, covering Hesse and Thuringia
- Landesbausparkasse Saar in Saarbrücken, covering Saarland
- Landesbausparkasse Südwest in Stuttgart, covering Baden-Württemberg and Rhineland-Palatinate
- Bayerische Landesbausparkasse (LBS Bayern) in Munich, covering Bavaria

The first Landesbausparkassen were established in 1929. The corporate forms and ownership structures of the Landesbausparkassen are diverse, even though all involve one or several regional associations (Sparkassenverbände). Some, like LBS Ost and Bausparkasse Schleswig-Holstein-Hamburg, are joint-stock companies, while others are public-sector entities. Bausparkasse Schleswig-Holstein-Hamburg is owned by the Sparkassenverband (57.5%) and Hamburger Sparkasse (42.5%). LBS Nord is owned by NordLB (44%), Landesbank Berlin (12%) and the Lower Saxon Sparkassenverband (44%). Landesbausparkasse Hessen-Thüringen is majority-owned (68.85%) by the regional Sparkassenverband but also has stakes from the two Länder of Hesse and Thuringia as well as from the two Sparkassenverbände of North Rhine-Westphalia and two legal entities of the Finanzgruppe, FIDES Alpha and FIDES Beta. Landesbausparkasse Saar is owned by the Land (74.9%) and the Sparkassenverband (25.1%) of Saarland. For the others, the relevant regional association(s) are the sole Träger.

Further consolidation happened in 2023: LBS Süd (Landesbausparkasse Süd, Stuttgart und München) was formed by merger of LBS Bayern and LBS Südwest; LBS NordWest (Landesbausparkasse NordWest, Münster und Hannover) by merger of LBS Nord and LBS West; and LBS NordOst (Landesbausparkasse NordOst, Hamburg, Kiel und Potsdam) by merger of Bausparkasse Schleswig-Holstein-Hamburg AG and LBS Ost.

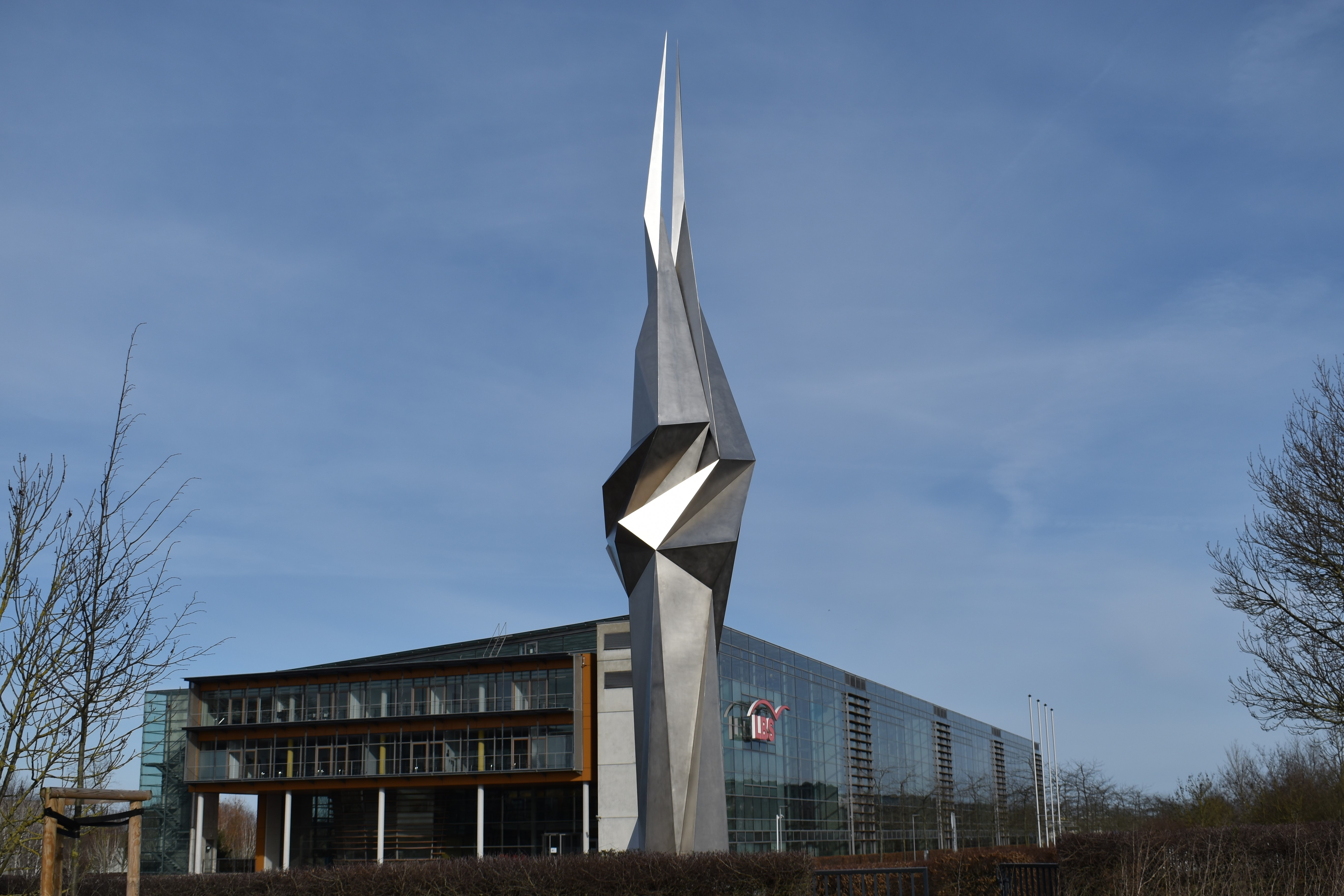
LBS Nord head office in Hanover

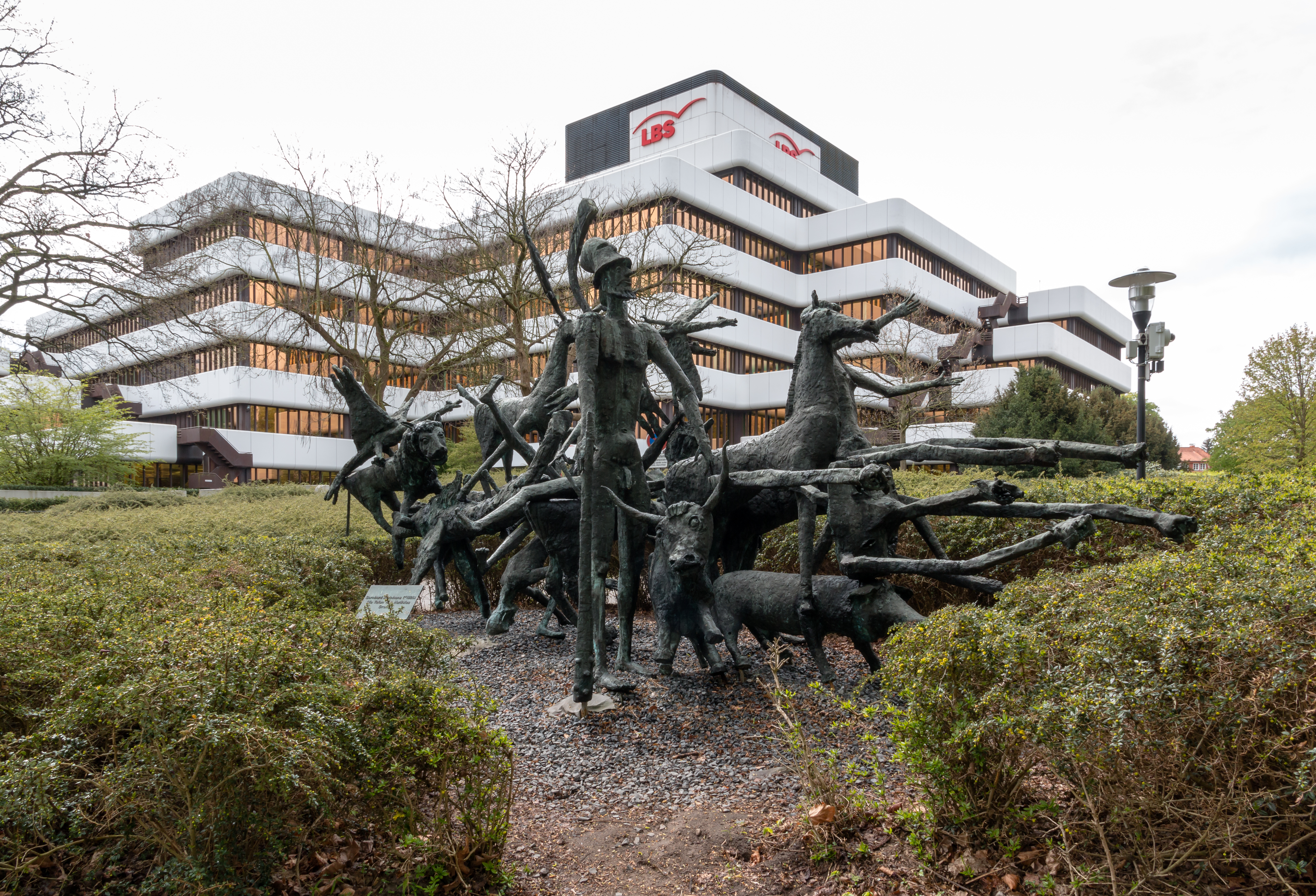
LBS West head office in Münster

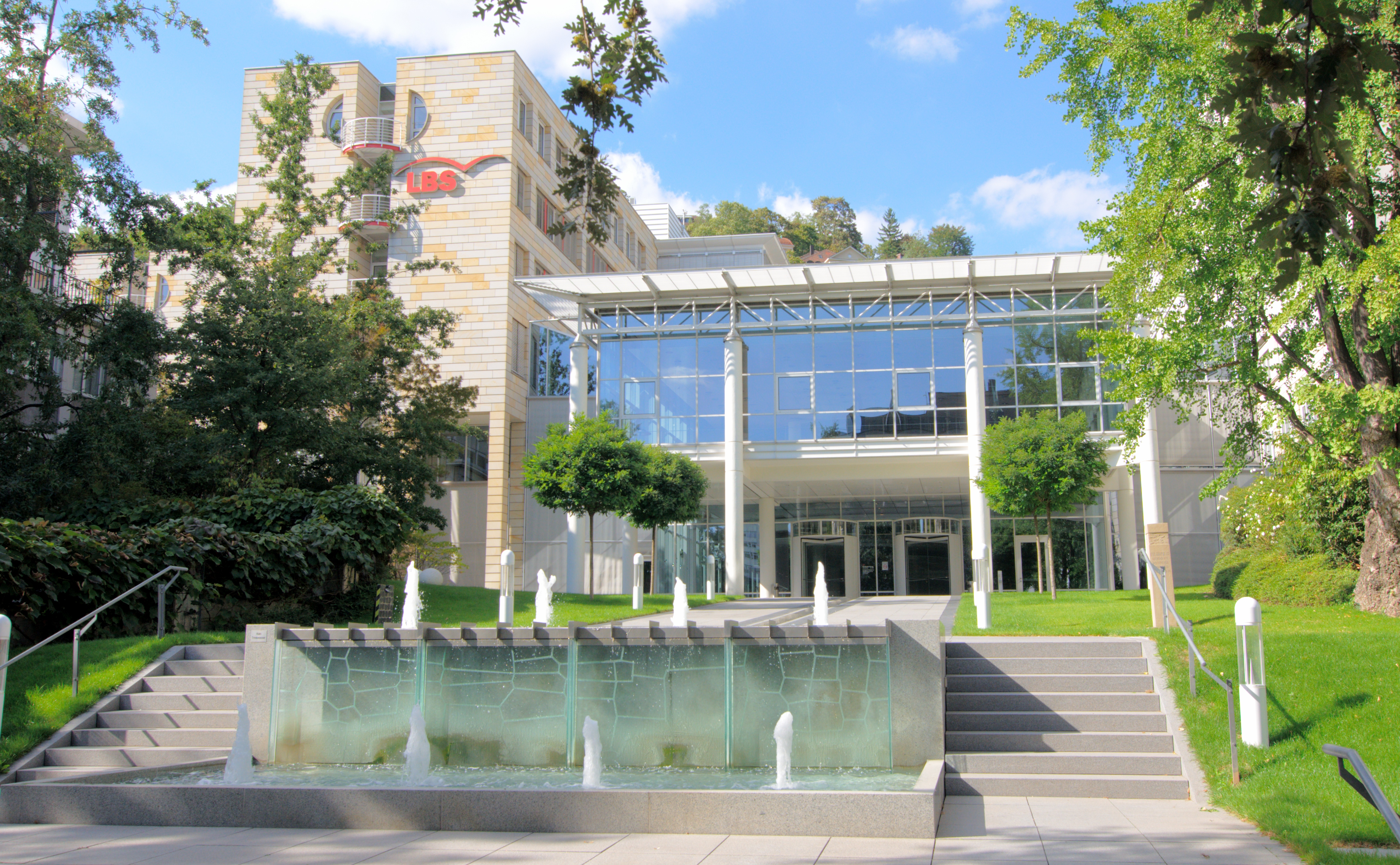
LBS Südwest head office in Stuttgart

=== DekaBank ===
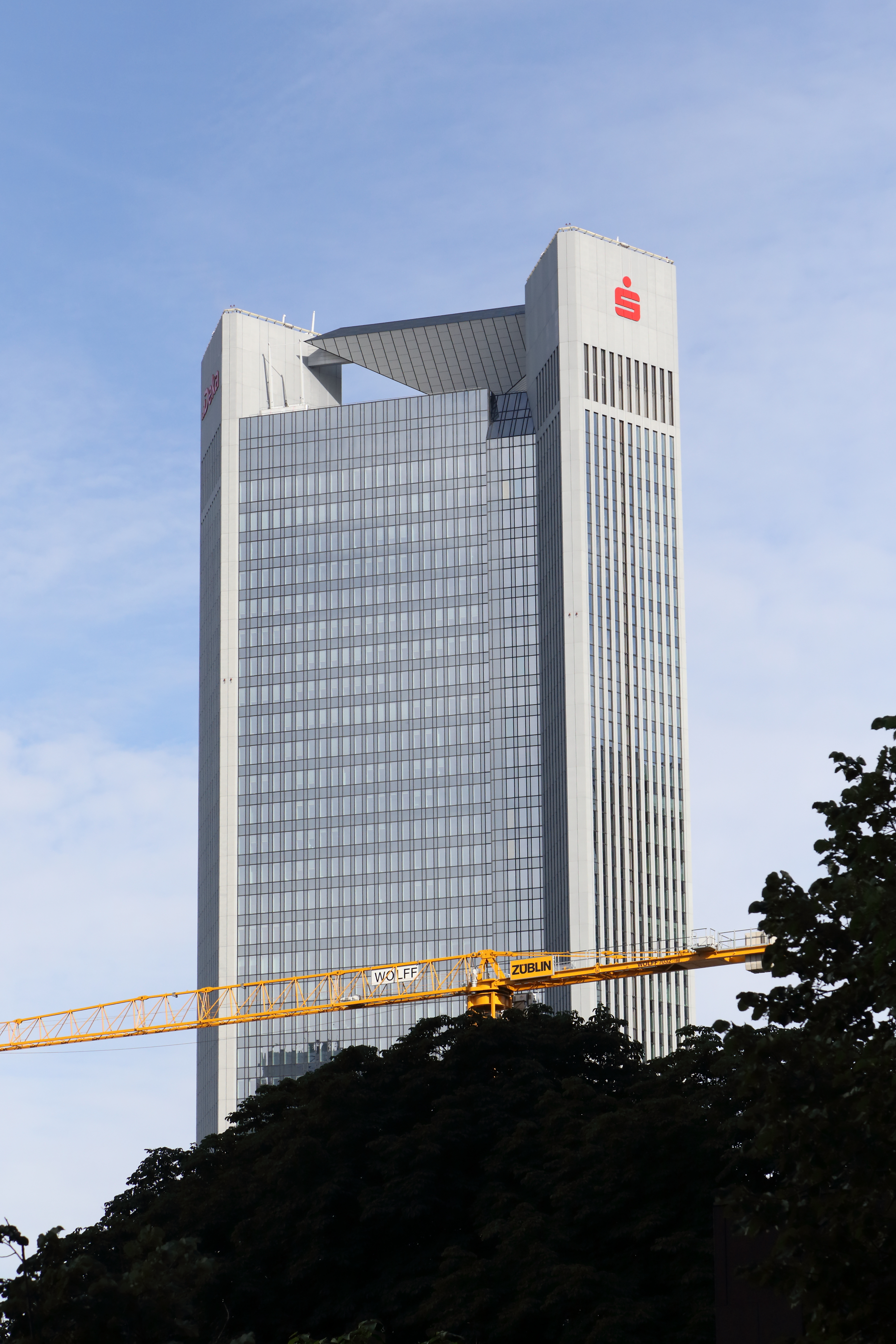
Trianon Tower in Frankfurt, head office of DekaBank

DekaBank with its subsidiaries is the central asset manager of the German Savings Bank Finance Group. Based in Frankfurt and Berlin it provides asset management and other services for the Sparkassen and Landesbanks. It resulted in 1999 from the merger of Deutsche Girozentrale (DGZ), established in 1918 as a national hub for the savings banks' regional giro associations, and Deka (Deutsche Kapitalanlagegesellschaft), an investment company established in 1956.

Until 8 June 2011, DekaBank was owned by the DSGV and Landesbanks which grouped the shares in the GLB GmbH & Co.OHG, which held the DekaBank shares. On 7 April 2011, the Savings Banks bought the 50% stake from the landesbanken for €2.3 billion to become sole owner of the DekaBank. The acquisition was closed on 8 June 2011 and DekaBank became fully, directly owned by the savings banks.

3,700 people throughout the group work in one of the three business divisions AMK (Asset Management Capital Markets), AMI (Asset Management Real Estate Business), C&M (Corporates and Markets), the sales division or one of the corporate centers.

=== Foundations ===
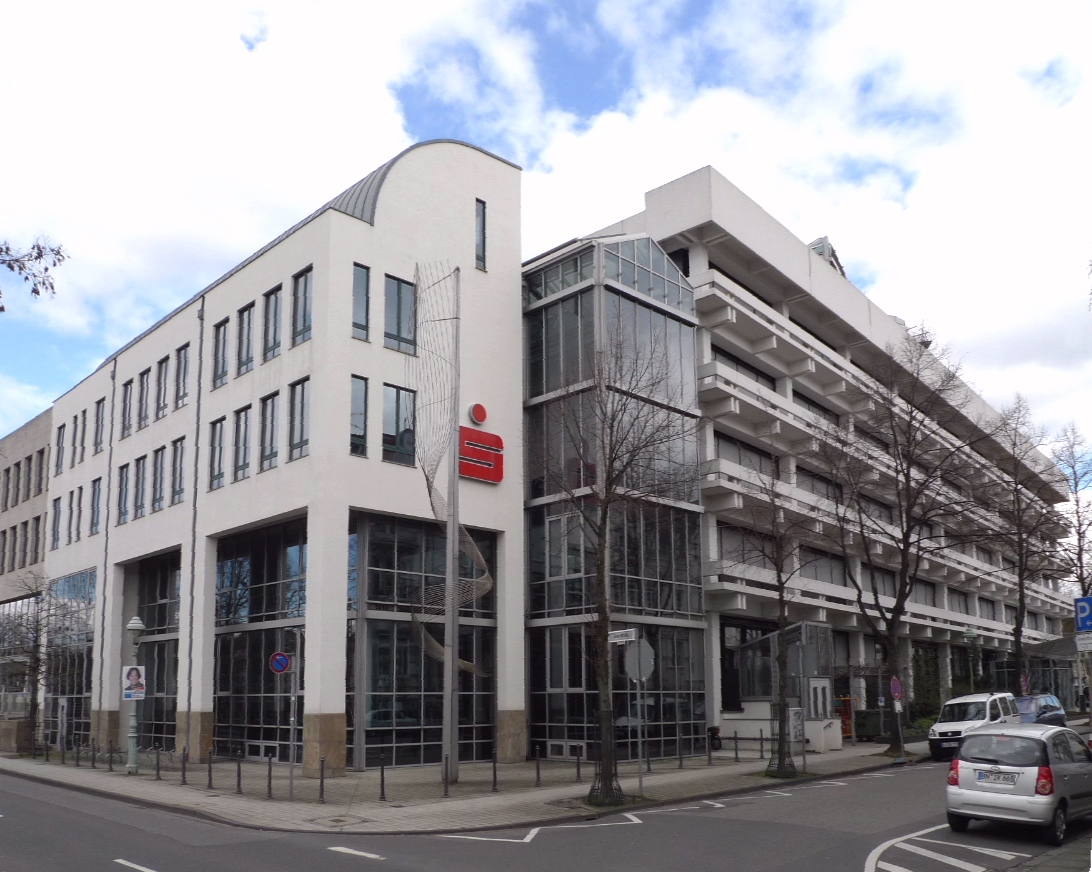
Head office of the German Savings Banks Foundation for International Cooperation in Bonn

As of end-2020, the Savings banks network maintained a total of 769 foundations in Germany, with total capital of €2.72 billion. At the national level, the German Savings Banks Foundation for International Cooperation (German: Deutsche Sparkassenstiftung für internationale Kooperation e.V.) in Bonn, also known as Deutsche Sparkassenstiftung, centralizes actions in favor of international development.

== Group arrangements ==
The internal legal and financial arrangements of the Sparkassen-Finanzgruppe are complex, in line with its largely decentralized structure that mirrors its long history.

=== Institutional protection scheme ===
The core feature of the Sparkassen-Finanzgruppe is a set of mutual support arrangements known as an Institutional Protection Scheme (IPS) in EU law, namely the Capital Requirements Regulation. The Sparkassen-Finanzgruppe IPS is complex and its contractual details are not made public. It started in 1969 with the establishment of protection schemes (German: Sicherungseinrichtungen) on a regional basis, expanded to the Landesbanks through a community of liability (German: Haftungsverbund) in 1973, and was reformed in 2005 following negotiations with the European Commission on state aid control.

As of 2021, the Sparkassen-Finanzgruppe IPS included 13 participating sub-funds (German: Teilfonds):

- eleven regional Savings Banks sub-funds (German: Sparkassenstützungsfonds) managed by the respective regional Sparkassenverbände, covering all of Germany except Berlin which relies on the reserve fund of the Landesbank Berlin;
- a national sub-fund of the Landesbanken and Girozentralen;
- a national sub-fund of the eight Landesbausparkassen.

The Landesbanks' sub-fund includes the six remaining such institutions (BayernLB, Helaba, LBBW, NORD/LB, SaarLB, and Landesbank Berlin AG) as well as the national DekaBank; the Berlin entities Landesbank Berlin Holding and Berlin Hyp; the defunct WestLB's "bad bank", Portigon AG; Frankfurter Bankgesellschaft, the group's main private bank; Weberbank, another private bank once owned by WestLB and subsequentlty by the Potsdam-based Mittelbrandenburgische Sparkasse; and two specialized arms of the Sparkassen-Finanzgruppe, S-Kreditpartner (car loans and consumer credit) and S Broker (securities brokerage). Hamburg Commercial Bank left it by end-2021.

Each of the regional sub-funds absorbs losses as needed to preventively support a member entity in need, unless it is itself depleted in which case it is in turn supported by the other regional sub-funds on a proportional basis ("supra-regional equalization") and, if further needed, also by the two national sub-funds ("system-wide equalization"). The exact formula for such equalization, however, has not been made clear in the public domain, and the protection is in no way automatic but instead relies on voting within the Sparkassenverbände and other managers of the relevant sub-funds. The corresponding uncertainty has generated concerns from the supervisors at the European Central Bank and BaFin and partial reform of the IPS adopted by the DSGV in August 2021. A new national protection fund is to be set up with 2.6 billion euro to be paid in by the Sparkassen and Landesbanken between 2025 and 2032, which is expected to allow for faster intervention in future cases of need, complementing the existing IPS setup of 13 regional and sectoral sub-funds.

The DSGV does not generally disclose cases or amounts of IPS interventions. One known case was the rescue of Norddeutsche Landesbank in 2019, in which the IPS contributed 1.2 billion euro in fresh equity in addition to contributions by the relevant Länder. This case also highlighted the protracted nature of the Sparkassen-Finanzgruppe's IPS decision-making process, with a delay of nearly five months from the IPS's intervention decision to the agreement on basic principles (German: Grundlagenvereibarung) for NordLB's recapitalization.

A revision of the IPS statutes (German: Satzung) in early 2024 led credit rating agency Moody's to upgrade its ratings of IPS members and specifically of the Landesbanks, noting: "The revised statutes result in a more rule-based IPS that implements an early intervention system with clearly identified triggers and timely escalation of decision-making steps as well as increased ex-ante funds over time, which, in the view of the rating agency, increase the likelihood and timeliness of support".

=== Deposit guarantee scheme ===
In line with the EU Deposit Guarantee Scheme Directive of 2014, the IPS of the Sparkassen-Finanzgruppe is also designated as the deposit guarantee scheme for all its member banks. In August 2021, the DSGV members unanimously adopted a resolution to reform the system and establish a deposit insurance fund, gradually from 2024 to 2025.

=== Accounting and auditing ===
The Sparkassen-Finanzgruppe publishes unaudited, unconsolidated, aggregated financial statements of the German activities of its group entities, in line with the disclosure requirement for IPSs enshrined in Article 113(7)(e) of the EU Capital Requirements Regulation. Specifically, the scope of aggregation in 2021 (report on the financial year 2020) included all Savings Banks, Landesbanken, Landesbausparkassen, as well as Hamburg Commercial Bank since it was still affiliated with the Institution Protection Scheme. Neither the foreign branches of Landesbanken nor any of their subsidiaries, whether domestic or foreign, are included, and neither are the foreign branches of Landesbausparkassen. On that basis, the group had total aggregated assets of €2.4 trillion as of end-2020, of which 1.4 trillion in the local savings banks.

The following entities are members of the IPS even though they are not included in the group's scope of accounting aggregation: Berlin Hyp, Deutsche Hypothekenbank, Frankfurter Bankgesellschaft (Deutschland) AG, Landesbank Berlin Holding, Portigon AG, S-Kreditpartner, S Broker, and Weberbank.

Most entities of the Sparkassen-Finanzgruppe have no external auditors but are audited instead by audit entities of the group itself. Some group-level entities such as DekaBank, however, publish externally audited financial statements.

=== Branding ===
The S-shaped logo of the Sparkassen-Finanzgruppe is one of Germany's most recognizable brand images. It was introduced in 1938 and given its present form, with the trademark red color, in 1972 by designer Otl Aicher. Erste Bank in Austria also uses said logo under license since the 1950s.

== Leadership ==
The leading public figure of the Sparkassen-Finanzgruppe at the national level is the President of the DSGV, also known as the Sparkassenpräsident.

- 1924–1935: Ernst Eberhard Kleiner
- 1935–1945: Johannes Heintze
- 1945–1967: Fritz Butschkau (1945–1953 as Geschäftsführender Direktor)
- 1967–1972: Ludwig Poullain
- 1972–1993: Helmut Geiger
- 1993–1998: Horst Köhler
- 1998–2006: Dietrich H. Hoppenstedt
- 2006–2012: Heinrich Haasis
- 2012–2017: Georg Fahrenschon
- 2017–present: Helmut Schleweis

== See also ==
- Sparkassengruppe Österreich in Austria
- Südtiroler Sparkasse – Cassa di Risparmio di Bolzano in Italy
- Banque et Caisse d'Épargne de l'État – Spuerkeess in Luxembourg
- Swedbank in Sweden
- SpareBank 1 in Norway
- Sberbank in Russia
- Groupe Caisse d'Épargne in France, including its successor Groupe BPCE
- German Cooperative Financial Group, the other large German network of non-joint-stock banks
- German public banking sector
- List of banks in Germany
