= Landesbank Berlin Holding =

Landesbank Berlin AG
- Formerly: Bankgesellschaft Berlin
- Company type: Aktiengesellschaft
- Industry: Commercial bank
- Founded: December 19, 2005; 19 years ago
- Headquarters: Berlin, Germany
- Number of employees: 3210
- Parent: Deutscher Sparkassen- und Giroverband
- Website: lbb.de

Landesbank Berlin Holding (formerly Bankgesellschaft Berlin; FWB: BEB2) is a large commercial bank based in Berlin, Germany. It is the holding company of the Berliner Sparkasse and Landesbank. In 2007, LBB was taken over by the Deutscher Sparkassen- und Giroverband (DSGV). Berlin was forced to sell its stake by the European Commission as a condition of permitting the bailout of the then Bankgesellschaft Berlin, which had gotten into difficulties due to a real-estate scandal. In 2010, a net profit of EUR 317 million was reported.

LBB has been designated as a Significant Institution since the entry into force of European Banking Supervision in late 2014, and as a consequence is directly supervised by the European Central Bank.

== See also ==
- German public banking sector
- List of banks in the euro area
- List of banks in Germany
