= Hamburger Sparkasse =

Public savings bank in Germany

- Native name: Hamburger Sparkasse AG
- Industry: Banking
- Founded: 1827
- Headquarters: Dammtorstraße 1, 20354 Hamburg, Germany
- Website: www.haspa.de

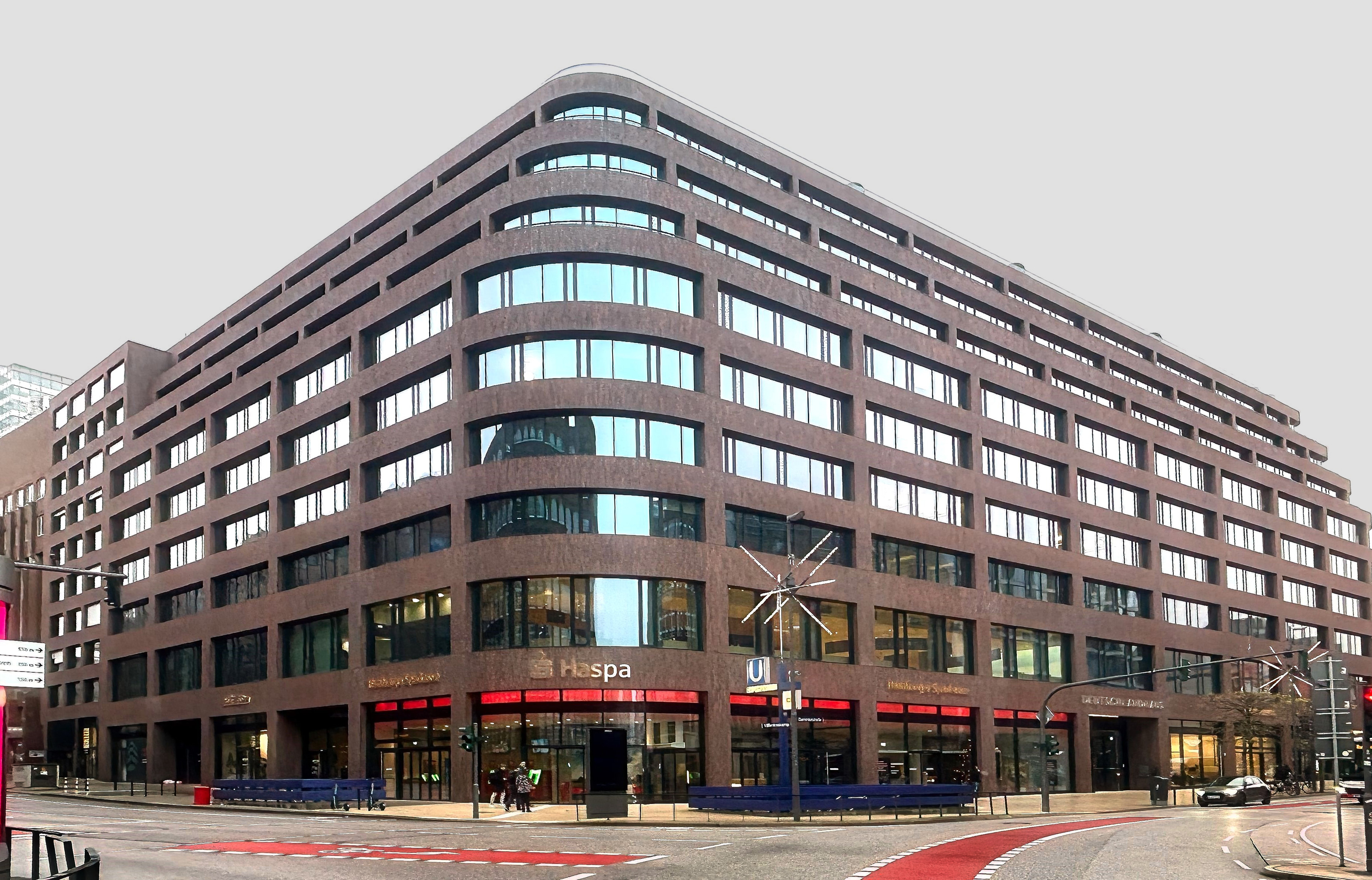
Hamburger Sparkasse (Head Office)

Hamburger Sparkasse AG (Haspa) is one of 5 free public savings banks in Germany based in Hamburg. With a balance sheet total of around 41.9 billion euros and about 5,000 employees, it is the largest savings bank in Germany. It was founded in 1827 in the legal form of the old Hamburg law. In 2003 the bank was separated to a stock corporation and the original Hamburger Sparkasse changed its name to Haspa Finanzholding.

Haspa has been designated as a Significant Institution since the entry into force of European Banking Supervision in late 2014, and as a consequence is directly supervised by the European Central Bank.

== Corporate structure ==
Hamburger Sparkasse is a non-listed stock corporation. The legal basis of the Sparkasse is the Haspa statutes (Haspa-Satzung). For historical reasons, unlike most German Sparkassen, Haspa is not governed by the Sparkassengesetz but by the Aktiengesetz.

== Services ==
Haspa provides the universal banking business as a savings bank. According to its data, it is the market leader in the Hamburg Metropolitan Region for retail and medium-sized corporate clients. In contrast to most other savings banks, it is not subject to a savings bank law, but as a stock corporation it is subject to the German stock corporation law. Organs of the Sparkasse are the board of directors, the supervisory board, the general meeting and various advisory boards. Haspa Finanzholding is the only shareholder.

The savings bank is divided into different central areas. This includes:

- Retail customers
- Corporate banking
- Private banking

It has around 200 branches and customer centres. Other competence centres are dedicated to business start-ups, complex real estate transactions and large customer business. Haspa operates a total of around 370 ATMs in the greater Hamburg area.

Hamburger Sparkasse AG also has stakes in the following companies:

1. Haspa BGM - investment company for medium-sized companies
2. GBP Company for company pension planning mbH
3. Diebold Nixdorf Portavis GmbH
4. Hanseatic Savings Banks and Giro Association

== Business alignment ==
As a savings bank, Haspa operates the universal banking business. According to its own information, it is the market-leading bank in the Hamburg metropolitan region for retail customers and medium-sized corporate customers.

== History ==
Against the background of the end of the Napoleonic era and the reorganization of political conditions in Europe by the Congress of Vienna, the "Hamburger Sparkasse von 1827" was founded by Hamburg citizens on the initiative of Senator Amandus Augustus Abendroth. In the spirit of Hanseatic merchants, this was done without a contribution from the city. Surprisingly, it was soon found that not only the financially disadvantaged population was investing their money, but also business people, craftsmen and other tradespeople appeared. This showed that the population had independently modified the original concept of a "poor savings bank".

In the first few years, a business policy was pursued under the slogan “Sparkasse for the smallest amounts”, the primary goal of which was limited to deposits of 8 to 30 Kurant-Marks (at that time the common Hamburg currency), which earned interest at 3 1/8%. The business was initially modest, with two paid employees (bookkeeper and messenger) and six volunteers who were responsible for the deposits and withdrawals. The spatial presence was initially limited to two furnished offices: one each in the town hall and one in the Eimbeck house.

From 1847 to 1848, the Hamburg architects Hermann Peter Fersenfeldt and Carl Friedrich Reichardt, built today's Sparkasse building, which was initially used as the Reichsbank headquarters, at Adolphsplatz 2 in Hamburg, directly across from the Hamburg Stock Exchange.

A special turning point for the then young Sparkasse occurred in 1864. Due to differences in the management board of Haspa in connection with the abolition of the maximum deposit limit - now amounting to 60 marks - the two retired members of the board, Rudolf Martin and F. E. Schlueter, founded the "Neue Sparcasse von 1864" together with Senator Eduard Johns.

This division lasted into the second half of the 20th century. It was not until 1968 that the first steps in the merger of the two savings banks, which took place in 1972, were finally taken, with the decisive efforts of the board spokesman Peter Mählmann. In contrast to the majority of savings banks in Germany under public law, the new “Hamburger Sparkasse” continued to be constituted as a “legal person under old Hamburg law”, as a private savings bank.

An important step in the development of Haspa in the 1980s came with the end of the so-called savings bank war between Haspa and the state of Schleswig-Holstein. This particularly concerned a conflict in which the Hamburger Sparkasse was prohibited from opening further branches in the communities in Schleswig-Holstein bordering Hamburg. This legal dispute went up to the Federal Administrative Court on a legal level. This highest authority gave Haspa the right: It is allowed to open branches in the Hamburg area. On that day, the banking operations of Hamburger Sparkasse were transferred to a stock corporation and the company under old Hamburg law was renamed "Haspa Finanzholding".

== See also ==
- List of banks in the euro area
- List of banks in Germany
