= Association of German Public Banks =

Government owned banks

Logo

The Association of German Public Banks (German: Bundesverband Öffentlicher Banken Deutschlands, generally referred to as VÖB) is a leading association within the German banking sector, bringing together most of the German public banking sector except the local-level savings banks (German: Sparkassen). Its membership includes 63 banks, including the Landesbanks that are also members of the Deutscher Sparkassen- und Giroverband (DSGV) and form part of the Sparkassen-Finanzgruppe, and promotional and development banks (German: Förderbanken) owned by the Federal Republic of Germany or the individual German federal states.

VÖB is the only German banking association exercising the functions of an employer association for its member institutions: the Public-Sector Banks’ Employer Association (German: Tarifgemeinschaft Öffentlicher Banken), which comprises VÖB member institutions with a total of 60,000 employees (as at financial year 2022) and which performs collective bargaining duties. VÖB is also a member of the European Banking Federation (EBF) together with the Bundesverband deutscher Banken, Germany being the only country represented in the EBF by more than one member, and of the European Association of Public Banks.

== History ==
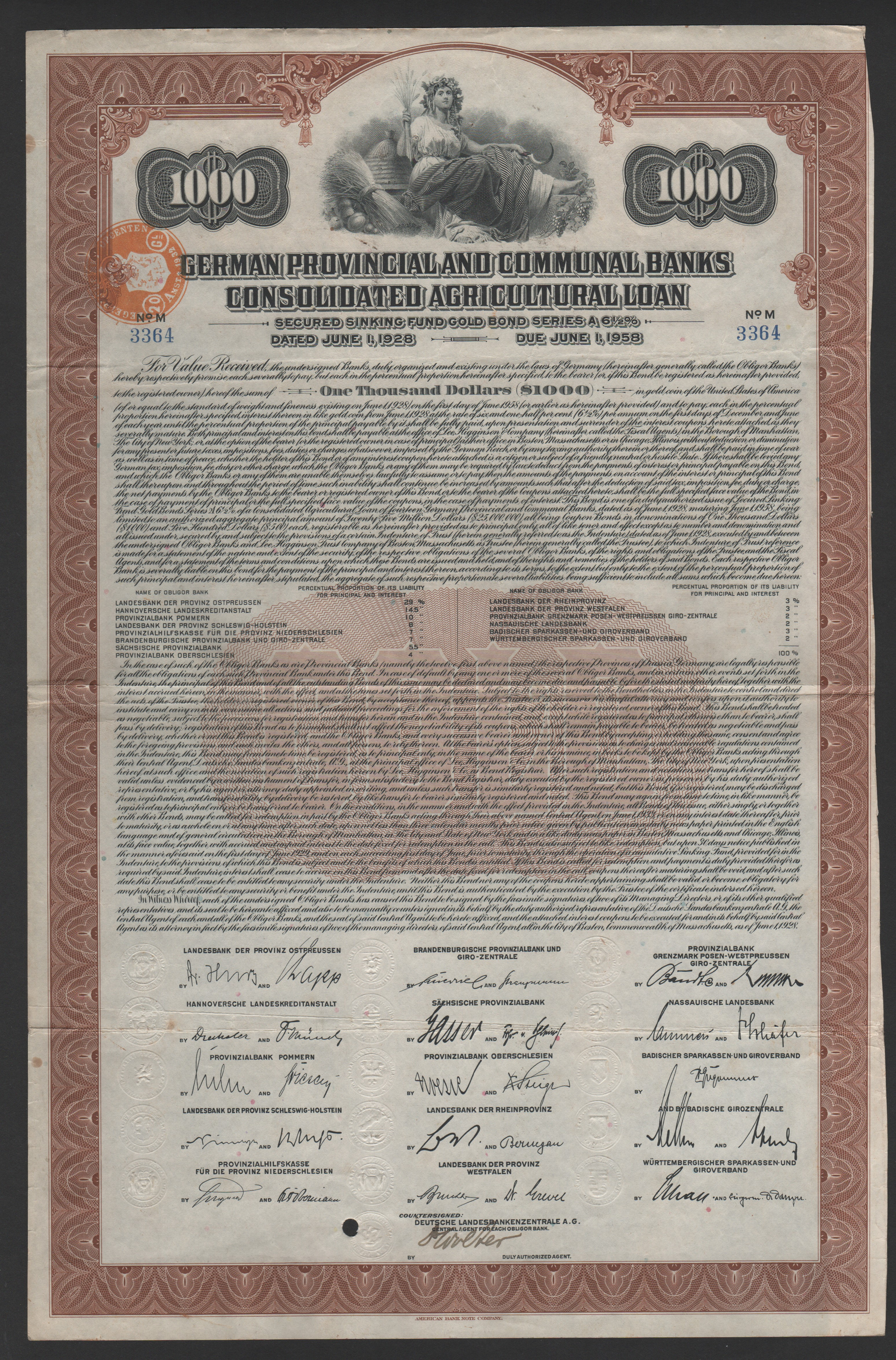
Sinking Fund Gold Bond of the Verband deutscher öffentlich-rechtlicher Kreditanstalten, issued 1. Juny 1928

The Verband deutscher öffentlich-rechtlicher Kreditanstalten was originally established in Berlin in 1916, and renamed Verband Öffentlicher Banken in 1974.

== Membership ==
With total assets of some 3,029 billion euros, VÖB's member institutions cover approximately one quarter of the German banking market. Public-sector banks view themselves as owing responsibility towards SMEs, other enterprises, the public sector, and retail customers; they are deeply rooted in their respective home regions, all over Germany.

Ordinary VÖB member banks are market leaders in local authority financing, with a 59 percent market share. In addition, they provide some 22 percent of all corporate lending in Germany. In 2022, development and promotional banks at federal and state level provided 72 billion euros in new development and promotional loans.

As of mid-2022, the VÖB's ordinary membership included:

- the federal development bank KfW (formerly Kreditanstalt für Wiederaufbau) and its export financing subsidiary KfW IPEX-Bank, both based in Frankfurt
- Landwirtschaftliche Rentenbank in Frankfurt, a national agricultural development bank
- the regional development banks (German: Förderbank) of the 16 respective German states (German: Länder), namely:
  - Investitionsbank Schleswig-Holstein (IB.SH) in Kiel, for Schleswig-Holstein
  - Landesförderinstitut Mecklenburg-Vorpommern (LFI-MV) in Schwerin, for Mecklenburg-Vorpommern
  - Hamburgische Investitions- und Förderbank (IFB Hamburg) for Hamburg
  - Bremer Aufbau-Bank (BAB) for Bremen
  - Investitionsbank Berlin (IBB) for Berlin
  - Investitionsbank des Landes Brandenburg (ILB) in Potsdam, for Brandenburg
  - Investitions- und Förderbank Niedersachsen (NBank) in Hanover, for Lower Saxony
  - Investitionsbank Sachsen-Anhalt (IB) in Magdeburg, for Saxony-Anhalt
  - Sächsische Aufbaubank (SAB) in Leipzig, for Saxony
  - NRW.Bank in Düsseldorf and Münster, for North Rhine-Westphalia
  - Thüringer Aufbaubank in Erfurt, for Thuringia
  - Wirtschafts- und Infrastrukturbank Hessen (WI-Bank) in Offenbach am Main, for Hesse
  - Investitions- und Strukturbank Rheinland-Pfalz (ISB) in Mainz, for Rhineland-Palatinate
  - Saarländische Investitionskreditbank (SIKB) in Saarbrücken, for Saarland
  - Landeskreditbank Baden-Württemberg – Förderbank (L-Bank) in Karlsruhe, for Baden-Württemberg
  - LfA Förderbank Bayern in Munich, for Bavaria
- several non-retail member banks of the Sparkassen-Finanzgruppe:
  - Norddeutsche Landesbank (NORD/LB) in Hanover
  - Landesbank Hessen Thüringen (known as Helaba from its former name Hessische Landesbank) in Frankfurt and Erfurt
  - Landesbank Saar (SaarLB) in Saarbrücken
  - Landesbank Baden-Württemberg (LBBW) in Stuttgart
  - Bayerische Landesbank (BayernLB) in Munich
  - DekaBank in Frankfurt
- five diverse additional institutions:
  - Calenberger Kreditverein in Hanover
  - Deutsche Kreditbank (DKB) in Berlin, a subsidiary of BayernLB
  - Internationales Bankenhaus Bodensee (IBB) in Friedrichshafen, a subsidiary of Würth
  - Ritterschaftliches Kreditinstitut Stade in Stade, a subsidiary of Hannoversche Volksbank
  - Weberbank in Berlin, a subsidiary of Mittelbrandenburgische Sparkasse

In addition, the VÖB has extraordinary members, which as of mid-2022 included Aareal Bank, Deutsche WertpapierService Bank, several Sparkassen, Landesbausparkassen and cooperative banks, several German stock exchanges, several Swiss cantonal banks, and other miscellaneous institutions such as Land Brandenburg Lotto, Lotto Sachsen-Anhalt, and an Austrian association of building societies.

== Deposit insurance ==
Until end-September 2021, the VÖB operated a mandatory deposit insurance system, the Entschädigungseinrichtung des Bundesverbandes Öffentlicher Banken Deutschlands GmbH, or "VÖB EdÖ". This became largely redundant and was phased out after the regional development banks were removed from the scope of EU banking and deposit insurance law in a revision of the EU Capital Requirements Regulation (CRR). The Landesbanken and DekaBank are affiliated with the deposit insurance and institutional protection scheme of the Sparkassen-Finanzgruppe. The other CRR members of VÖB (including DKB, despite it being a fully owned subsidiary of BayernLB) have opted to join the Entschädigungseinrichtung deutscher Banken, the mandatory deposit insurance scheme of the Bundesverband deutscher Banken.

The VÖB retains a residual additional (voluntary) deposit insurance scheme, the Einlagensicherungsfonds des Bundesverbandes Öffentlicher Banken Deutschlands e. V., or "VÖB ESF". Its only five members are Calenberger Kreditverein, Deutsche Kreditbank (DKB), Internationales Bankenhaus Bodensee, Landwirtschaftliche Rentenbank, and Ritterschaftliches Kreditinstitut Stade.

== Leadership ==
The President (German: Präsident) chairs the executive board (German: Vorstand) of the VÖB.

- 1970–1976: Kurt Hähnel
- 1976–1987: Hans Fahning
- 1987–2001: Friedel Neuber
- 2001–2004: Hans Dietmar Sauer
- 2004–2007: Thomas R. Fischer
- 2007–2009: Siegfried Jaschinski
- 2009–2013: Christian Brand
- 2013–2016: Gunter Dunkel
- 2016–2018: Johannes-Jörg Riegler
- 2019–2025: Eckhard Forst
- 2025–present: Thomas Groß

== See also ==
- Public bank
- German Banking Industry Committee
- German public banking sector
- List of banks in Germany
