= Medienboard Berlin-Brandenburg =

State-owned company for film funding

- Founded: January 1, 2004; 22 years ago
- Headquarters: Potsdam
- Key people: Kirsten Niehuus, CEO Film Funding; Helge Jürgens, CEO New Media Funding; Florian Graf, Chairman of the Supervisory Board
- Owner: Investitionsbank Berlin (50%); Investitionsbank des Landes Brandenburg (50%)
- Website: www.medienboard.de

The Medienboard Berlin-Brandenburg is the body responsible for Film Funding and New Media Funding in the states of Berlin and Brandenburg. It is also the first point of contact for international and German professionals active in the film and media industries.

The Medienboard's Film Funding department has an annual budget of roughly €32 million. The films that have received support from the Medienboard include the Bollywood production Don 2 starring Shah Rukh Khan, Inglourious Basterds directed by Quentin Tarantino, The White Ribbon directed by Michael Haneke, The Ghost Writer directed by Roman Polanski, The Reader directed by Stephen Daldry, Unknown directed by Jaume Collet-Serra, When We Leave directed by Feo Aladag and Keinohrhasen directed by Til Schweiger.

The New Media Funding division provides funding for games and innovative audiovisual projects (e.g. multiplatform content, virtual and augmented reality) and serial formats (fiction, entertainment and factual) with an annual budget of roughly €6 million. Additionally, Medienboard Berlin-Brandenburg provides funding for regional media-related projects and events such as prizes, competitions, festivals, events and conferences. Funded projects include the series MaPa, Wir sind jetzt, Für Umme and the computer games Dorfromantik, Through the Darkest of Times and Trüberbrook. Events and award ceremonies for the media industry, such as the Deutscher Computerspielpreis (German Computer Games Award), are also part of the Medienboard's funding portfolio.

== Film Funding ==
The Medienboard funds German and international films in the categories of Development, Production and Sales & Distribution (feature films, documentaries, animation, short films, international co-productions and high end series). The funds provided by the Medienboard are conditionally repayable loans and must be spent entirely in Berlin-Brandenburg. They can be combined with other funding.

== New Media Funding ==
The new media funding division supports the digital branches of the German Capital Region: projects in the areas of games, extended reality and innovative audiovisual formats as well as serial formats from fiction, factual and entertainment.

== Creative Europe Desk Berlin-Brandenburg ==
Creative Europe Desk Berlin-Brandenburg, which is affiliated with the Medienboard, is one of the four German information offices set up as part of the EU's Brussels-based MEDIA Programme. It provides information and support for producers, distributors, cinema operators, festivals and audiovisual companies with regard to the funding measures provided by the MEDIA Programme. It also supports applicants in filing submissions. The Desk is financed by the MEDIA Programme, the Medienboard and the Mitteldeutsche Medienförderung (MDM - Central German Media Fund) in Leipzig.

== Berlin Brandenburg Film Commission ==
The Berlin Brandenburg Film Commission (bbfc) is a department within the Medienboard that assists film and media companies interested in shooting in Germany's capital region. The bbfc helps in finding locations, acquiring filming permits and connecting to the local film industry. The Film Commission also holds a comprehensive and constantly updated database of addresses and images covering the Berlin-Brandenburg film and media region.
