= Deutsche WertpapierService Bank =

Coordinates: 50.122676°N 8.650153°E

Deutsche WertpapierService Bank AG
- Company type: Corporation
- Industry: Transaction banking
- Founded: 4 August 2003
- Headquarters: Frankfurt, Germany
- Total assets: €526.8 million (2018)
- Number of employees: 1,234 (2018)
- Website: www.dwpbank.de

As a transaction bank, the Deutsche WertpapierService Bank AG (dwpbank) handles the securities processing for financial institutions from the savings bank and cooperative sector, but also from the private and commercial banking sector in Germany. dwpbank currently manages around 5.34 million securities accounts.

== History ==
dwpbank in its present form was created on 4 August 2003 from the merger between Bank für Wertpapierservice und -systeme AG, Frankfurt (bws bank) and WPS WertpapierService Bank AG, Düsseldorf (WPS Bank). The predecessor institutes already started in mid-1998 as pioneers in transaction banking. At the time of foundation, the shares were distributed to Sparkassenverband Westfalen-Lippe, Münster with 25%, Rheinische SGV, Düsseldorf with 25%, DZ Bank, Frankfurt with 40% and WGZ-Bank, Düsseldorf with 10%. Thus, the ownership structure was divided equally between the Volksbanks and Sparkassen Gruppe. However, the ownership structure is open to other owners.

In March 2007, dwpbank expanded through the acquisition of TxB Transaktionsbank GmbH. TxB, which was initially a wholly owned subsidiary of dwpbank-Gruppe, was merged into dwpbank on 25 August 2008.

== Shareholders ==
- 50% DZ Bank
- 20% Sparkassenverband Westfalen-Lippe
- 20% Rheinischer Sparkassen- und Giroverband
- 3,74501 % BayernLB
- 3,74499 % Helaba
- 2,51 % HSH Nordbank

WGZ Bank which was involved in the foundation had sold its 10% stake in the meantime to DZ Bank.

== Organs ==
=== Board ===
Since January 1, 2016, Heiko Beck (Department of Corporate Management and Customer Management), Thomas Klanten (Department of IT and Finance and Risk Management) and Markus Neukirch (Department of Operations) have been the Board of Directors of the dwpbank. Heiko Beck was appointed CEO on January 1, 2016. On February 1, 2017, Markus Neukirch became a member of the executive board, following Christian Tonnesen. Klanten, previously chief representative and member of the dwpbank's management since its founding, was appointed to the executive board on 28 November 2013; Tonnesen joined HSH Nordbank on November 1, 2011. At the same time as November 28, 2013, former CEO Markus Walch and the Chief Sales Officer Karl-Martin im Brahm left the company. Walch had been a member of the executive board since October 2011 (previously DAB Bank) and, from 1 January 2012, Chairman; im Brahm (previously S-Broker) belonged to the board since December 2007.

Since the company was founded in 2003, the board has been headed by Ralf Gissel, who was responsible for the Department of Corporate Control and on April 6, 2011 surprisingly left the dwpbank. Deputy chairman of the executive board Sören Christensen, who has also been in this position since its founding, retired from the Executive Board as of December 31, 2011 due to age.

=== Board ===
Since June 24, 2013, the Supervisory Board of dwpbank consists of two-thirds representatives of the shareholders and one-third of the employees' representatives. In total it has 15 members.

== Locations ==
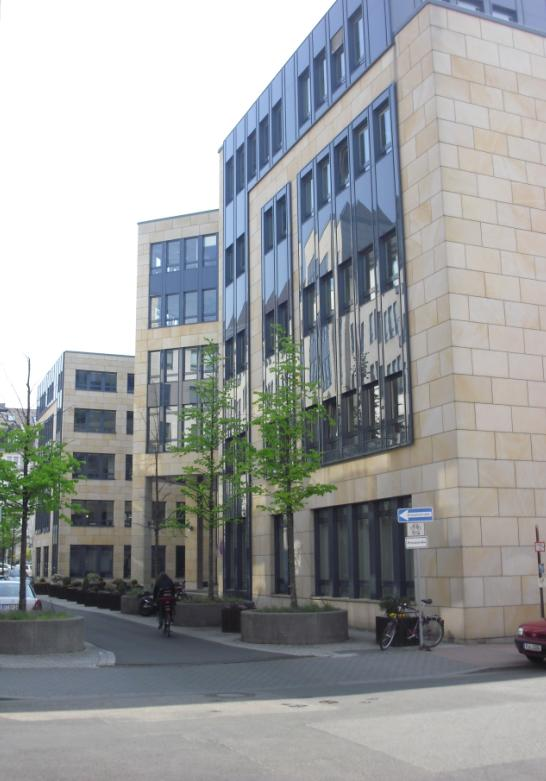
Headquarters at Wildunger Straße 14 in Frankfurt

Headquarters is Frankfurt am Main. dwpbank now has branches in the following locations:

- Munich
- Düsseldorf
- Hamburg - closed 30. Juni 2010
- Hanover - closed 30. März 2013
- Herford - closed 30. Dezember 2016
- Troisdorf

== Customers ==
The bank manages financial institutions from all three pillars of the German banking industry. It manages a central bank (DZ BANK) with 1003 affiliated credit unions, 391 savings banks from 16 federal states, six Landesbanks (BayernLB, Bremer Landesbank, HSH Nordbank, Helaba, Nord/LB and SaarLB), Portigon AG (formally Westdeutsche Immobilienbank AG) and other institutions from the private sector and business banking sector, u. a. Deutsche Postbank, Santander Consumer Bank and SEB AG.

In the first half of 2007, major customer Dresdner Bank AG switched to the dwpbanking system and its end-customer accounts were "de-migrated" to their new owner Commerzbank in April 2011. Commerzbank remains the customer of the dwpbank with its accounts for major customers.

== Business development ==
	2016	2015	2014	2013	2012	2011	2010	2009	2008	2007
Brokerage accounts (in millions)	5,0	5,2	5,34	5,3	5,5	5,87	7,50	7,83	8,25	8,558
Transactions (in millions)	22,7	24,00	20,90	21,19	19,37	25,38	28,5	28,8	39,84	50,01
Securities portfolio (in billion €)		2.362	1.909	1.793	1.773	1.778	2.022	1.777	1.634	1.907

(As of the end of 2016)

== Securities settlement systems ==
dwpbank operates the securities settlement system WP2 with an estimated around 230,000 users. By the end of 2010, several other accounting systems were consolidated on the central IT platform WP2. The accounting program WVS was consolidated until 2010, BSV already in 2007. Dresdner Bank's WP chain system was consolidated in 2007. TxB WIS and EWS PLUS systems were upgraded in 2007 (EWS PLUS) and 2010 (WIS) to WP2.

== BOSC services ==
As a further task, dwpbank will, as far as possible, assume the entire securities back-office work of various clients.

== See also ==
- List of banks in the euro area
- List of banks in Germany
