= Investitions- und Strukturbank Rheinland-Pfalz =

German regional promotional bank

Investitions- und Strukturbank Rheinland-Pfalz (ISB) is the regional promotional bank (German: Förderbank) for the German state of Rhineland-Palatinate. It was established in 2004, and is headquartered in Mainz.

Together with other Förderbanken and the more commercially oriented Landesbanken, ISB is a member of the Association of German Public Banks (VÖB).

== See also ==
- KfW
- German public banking sector
- List of banks in Germany
