= Hamburgische Investitions- und Förderbank =

German regional promotional bank

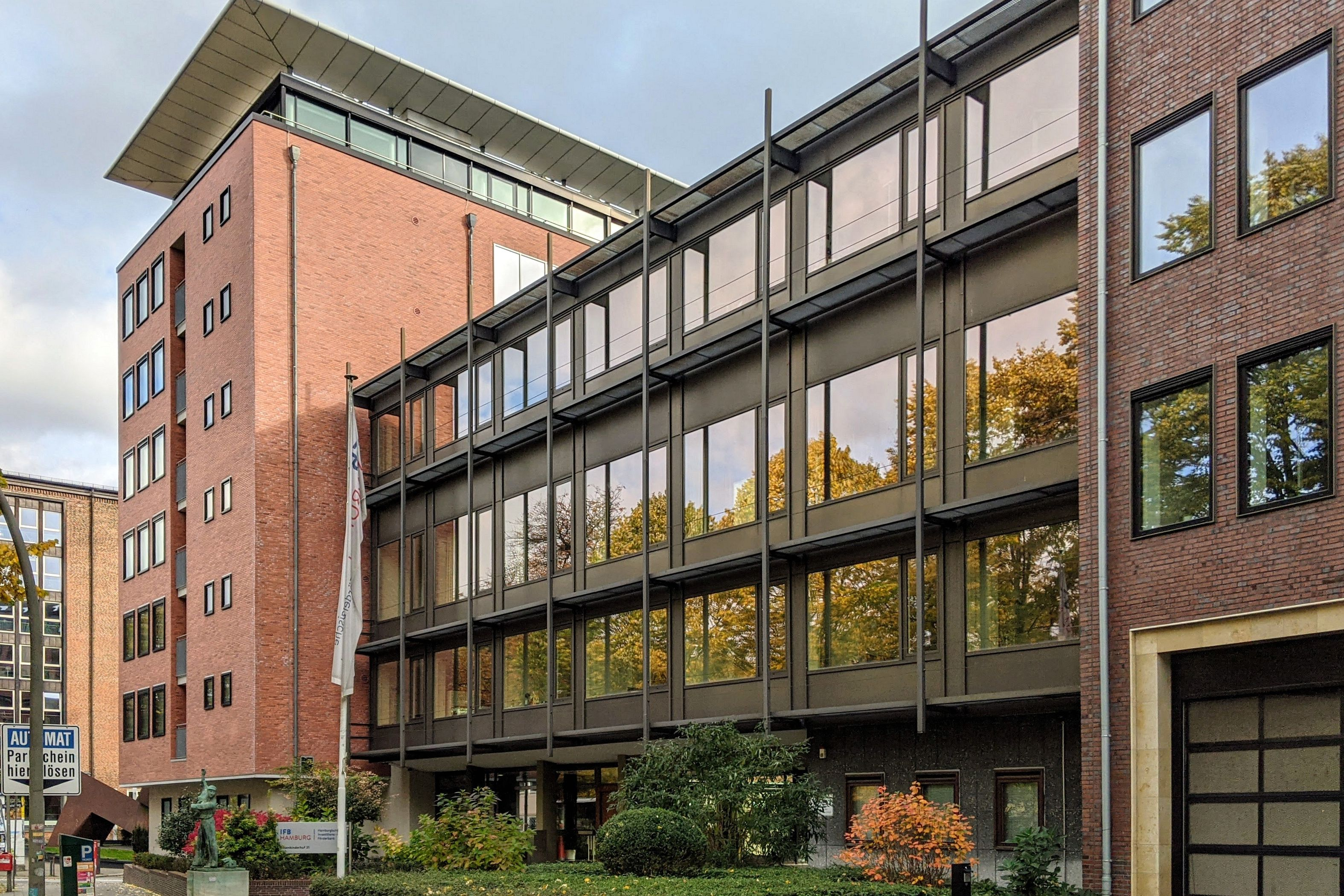
IFB Hamburg

Hamburgische Investitions- und Förderbank (IFB Hamburg) is the regional promotional bank (German: Förderbank) for the German state of Hamburg. It was established in 2005.

Together with other Förderbanken and the more commercially oriented Landesbanken, IFB Hamburg is a member of the Association of German Public Banks (VÖB).

== See also ==
- KfW
- German public banking sector
- List of banks in Germany
