= Saarländische Investitionskreditbank =

German regional promotional bank

Saarländische Investitionskreditbank (SIKB) is the regional promotional bank (German: Förderbank) for the German state of Saarland. It was established in 1951 and is headquartered in Saarbrücken.

Together with other Förderbanken and the more commercially oriented Landesbanken, SIKB is a member of the Association of German Public Banks (VÖB).

== See also ==
- KfW
- German public banking sector
- List of banks in Germany
