= Landesförderinstitut Mecklenburg-Vorpommern =

German regional promotional bank

Landesförderinstitut Mecklenburg-Vorpommern (LFI-MV) is the regional promotional bank (German: Förderbank) for the German state of Mecklenburg-Vorpommern. It was established in 1994, and is headquartered in Schwerin.

Together with other Förderbanken and the more commercially oriented Landesbanken, LFI-MV is a member of the Association of German Public Banks (VÖB).

== See also ==
- KfW
- German public banking sector
- List of banks in Germany
