= L-Bank =

German regional promotional bank

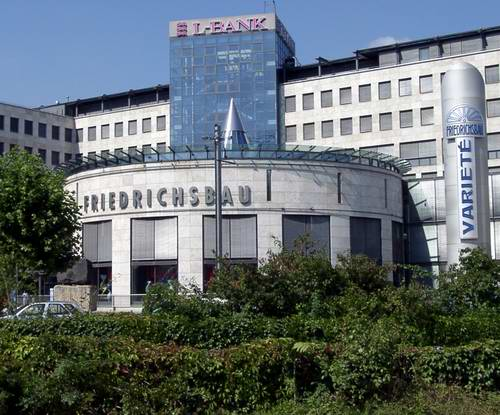
Head office of L-Bank in Stuttgart

L-Bank (complete name Landeskreditbank Baden-Württemberg – Förderbank –) is the regional Förderbank for the German state of Baden-Württemberg. It was established in 1998 and is headquartered in Stuttgart.

== Overview ==
L-Bank logo

In 1988, Landeskreditbank Baden-Württemberg spun off its development finance operations as Landeskreditbank Baden-Württemberg – Förderbank, branded L-Bank, before merging the next year with Südwestdeutsche Landesbank Girozentrale to form Landesbank Baden-Württemberg (LBBW). Also in 1998, the ownership of the Development Bank of Saxony was transferred from L-Bank to the state of Saxony.

In 2017, L-Bank lost a lawsuit in which it had argued that it should not have been brought under European Banking Supervision. Subsequent EU legislative changes, however, exempted all German Förderbanken from European-level supervision.

Together with other Förderbanken and the more commercially oriented Landesbanken, L-Bank is a member of the Association of German Public Banks (VÖB).

== See also ==
- KfW
- German public banking sector
- List of banks in Germany
