= NBank =

German regional promotional bank

Investitions- und Förderbank Niedersachsen

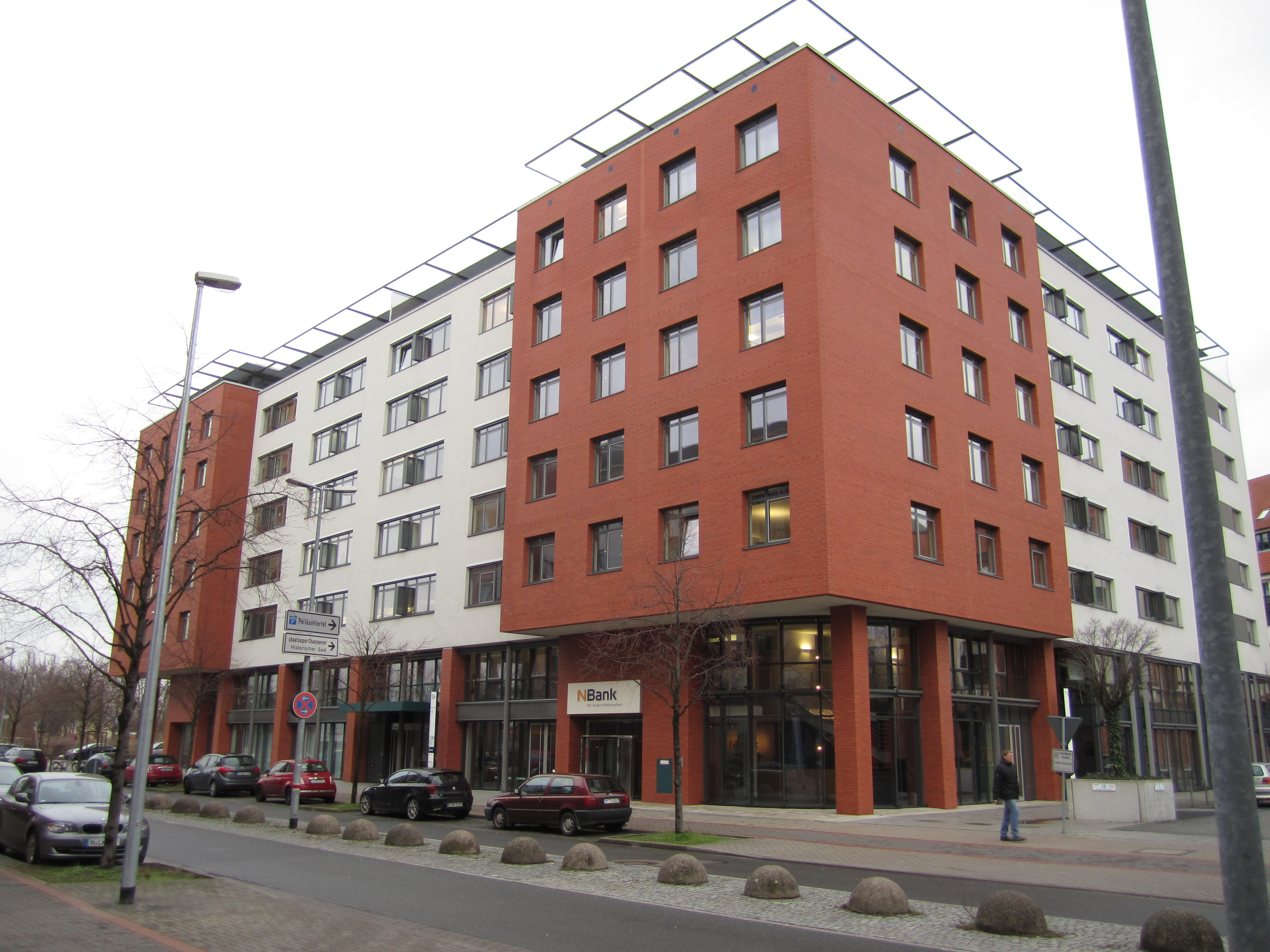
- Company type: Development bank
- Industry: Public finance
- Founded: 2004
- Headquarters: Hanover, Lower Saxony, Germany
- Area served: Lower Saxony
- Owner: State of Lower Saxony
- Website: https://www.nbank.de/

Investitions- und Förderbank Niedersachsen (NBank) is the regional promotional bank (German: Förderbank) for the German state of Lower Saxony. It was established in 2004, and is headquartered in Hanover.

Together with other Förderbanken and the more commercially oriented Landesbanken, NBank is a member of the Association of German Public Banks (VÖB).

== See also ==
- KfW
- German public banking sector
- List of banks in Germany
