= Bremer Aufbau-Bank =

German regional development bank

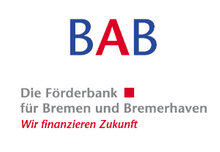
- Company type: State-owned enterprise
- Industry: Financial services
- Founded: 1951; 75 years ago
- Founder: Bremen state government
- Headquarters: Bremen, Germany
- Products: Development bank
- Owner: Bremen state government
- Website: www.bab-bremen.de

Bremer Aufbau-Bank (BAB) is a German regional development bank (German: Förderbank) of the German state of Bremen. It was established in 1951, and its current development bank mandate was defined by law in 2001.

== Overview ==
The bank operates under an explicit guarantee from the Bremen government, provided by state law. Like other Förderbanken, it does not compete directly with commercial banks but supplements them with co-lending, co-investment and guarantees. In 2023, it ramped up its programs to support local start-ups.

Together with other Förderbanken and the more commercially oriented Landesbanken, BAB is a member of the Association of German Public Banks (VÖB).

== See also ==
- KfW
- German public banking sector
- List of banks in Germany
