= Investitionsbank Schleswig-Holstein =

German regional promotional bank

Investitionsbank Schleswig-Holstein (IB.SH)
- Type: Development bank (Förderbank)
- Industry: Financial services
- Founded: 2001; 25 years ago
- Headquarters: Kiel, Schleswig-Holstein, Germany
- Area served: Schleswig-Holstein, Germany
- Products: Financing, subsidies, development banking
- Owner: State of Schleswig-Holstein
- Website: www.ib-sh.de

Investitionsbank Schleswig-Holstein (IB.SH) is a German regional development bank (German: Förderbank) for the German state of Schleswig-Holstein. It was established in 2001 and is headquartered in Kiel.

Together with other Förderbanken and the more commercially oriented Landesbanken, IB.SH is a member of the Association of German Public Banks (VÖB).

== See also ==
- KfW
- German public banking sector
- List of banks in Germany
