= Wirtschafts- und Infrastrukturbank Hessen =

German regional promotional bank

Wirtschafts- und Infrastrukturbank Hessen (WI-Bank) is the regional promotional bank (German: Förderbank) for the German state of Hesse. It was established in 2002 and is headquartered in Frankfurt and Offenbach am Main.

Together with other Förderbanken and the more commercially oriented Landesbanken, WI-Bank is a member of the Association of German Public Banks (VÖB).

== See also ==
- KfW
- German public banking sector
- List of banks in Germany
