= Hans-Dieter Brenner =

German banker

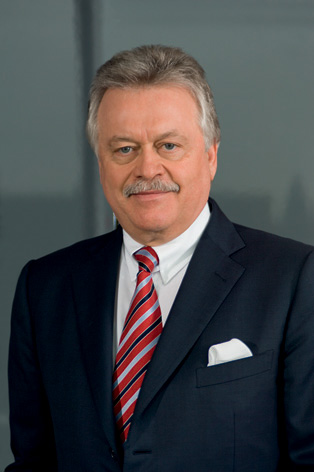
- Born: 30 April 1952 (age 74); Germany
- Education: Saarland University
- Occupation: Banker
- Employer: Helaba

Hans-Dieter Brenner (born 30 April 1952) a German businessman and Chief Executive of Helaba Landesbank Hessen-Thüringen.

== Biography ==
=== Education ===
Brenner studied Business Administration at the Saarland University in Saarbrücken, Germany. He started his professional life in 1979 at the accountancy and consulting firm Peat Marwick Mitchell & Co. (later KPMG Truehand GmbH).

=== Career ===
After his appointment as tax adviser in 1984 and certified public accountant in 1985, Brenner became managing director and Partner of KPMG Peat Marwick Treuhand GmbH. From 1993, he was head of the branch and partner of KMPG Deutsche Treuhandgesellschaft AG in Frankfurt am Main. Since 2001, he has been working for Helaba Landesbank Hessen-Thüringen. In 2002, Hans-Dieter Brenner joined the Board of Managing Directors of Landesbank Hessen-Thüringen and in 2006 was appointed vice-chairman of Landesbank Hessen-Thüringen. In 2008, he took over the office of chairman of the Board of Managing Directors of Helaba Landesbank Hessen-Thüringen.

He served as the vice chairman of the Board of Managing Directors of Helaba Landesbank Hessen-Thueringen Girozentrale from 1 May 2006 to 30 September 2008. He served as vice-président and member of Administrative Board at Banque LBLux S.A. Mr. He serves as a member of Economic Advisory Board of Fraport AG, and Helaba Landesbank Hessen-Thüringen Girozentrale. Mr. Brenner served as a member of Administrative Board of Deka Bank.
