= Investitionsbank des Landes Brandenburg =

German regional promotional bank

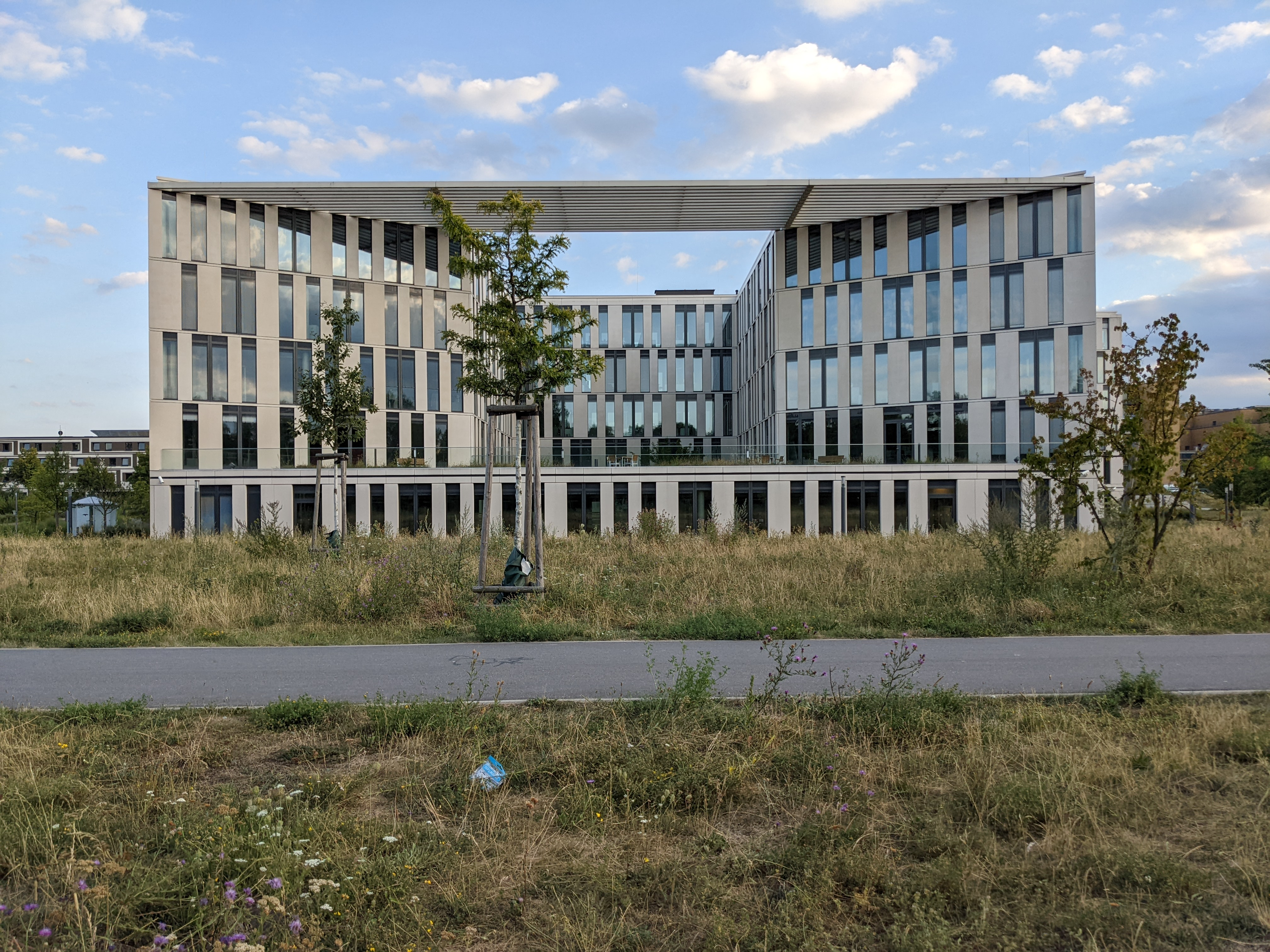
The bank in 2022

Investitionsbank des Landes Brandenburg (ILB) is the regional promotional bank (German: Förderbank) for the German state of Brandenburg. It was established in 1992 and is headquartered in Potsdam.

Together with other Förderbanken and the more commercially oriented Landesbanken, ILB is a member of the Association of German Public Banks (VÖB).

== See also ==
- KfW
- German public banking sector
- List of banks in Germany
