= Thomas Groß =

German banking executive

- Born: August 17, 1965 (age 61); Aalen, Germany
- Other name: Thomas Gross
- Education: Karlsruhe Institute of Technology
- Occupations: Business executive, banker
- Known for: CEO of German commercial bank Helaba

Thomas Groß (born August 1965) is a German banking executive. He has been chief executive officer of the Landesbank Hessen-Thüringen (Helaba) since June 2020, and a member of its management board since 2012. In November 2025, he was elected president of the Association of German Public Banks.

== Early life and education ==
Groß studied Industrial Engineering and Management at the University of Karlsruhe and graduated in 1992.

== Career ==
Groß began his professional career in 1992 at Boston Consulting Group. From 2000, he became partner and managing director in BCG's Frankfurt office and focused on advising financial services institutions. His focus was on banks and savings banks in Germany, Austria, Switzerland, and Central and Eastern Europe. From 2001 to 2004, he assumed the role of Global Head of Risk Management at BCG.

From 2004, Groß moved to HypoVereinsbank, Initially as Head of Credit Risk Controlling, later as Executive Board Member for Risk Controlling, and from 2006 also as Head of Credit Risk Control. His responsibilities included managing credit risk control, with group-level scope connected to the UniCredit Group in Milan. In October 2006, Groß became a member of the management board of Bank Austria as Chief Risk Officer. In 2008, his departure from the board in Vienna and a return to Germany were reported in the context of broader board changes at the bank.

From 2008 to 2012, Groß was a member of the management board at WestLB, linked to the Chief Risk Officer role and, from 2011, to Chief Financial Officer.

Groß joined Helaba’s management board in 2012. He became deputy CEO (stellvertretender Vorstandsvorsitzender) in 2015. On 1 June 2020, he assumed the role of CEO, succeeding Herbert Hans Grüntker. He is then responsible for group management and control, human resources and legal affairs, finance, internal audit, Frankfurter Sparkasse, and Frankfurter Bankgesellschaft. During his tenure, in July 2025, Reuters reported that Helaba was weighing a potential takeover of Aareal Bank, describing talks as early-stage and noting both banks declined to comment. In October 2025, Handelsblatt reported that takeover talks had ended.

On 27 November 2025, Groß was elected president of the Association of German Public Banks for a three-year term, succeeding Eckhard Forst.

In January 2025, Groß calls for a less politicized restart of the debate on a common European deposit insurance scheme.
