= DekaBank =

Asset manager of the German Sparkassen-Finanzgruppe

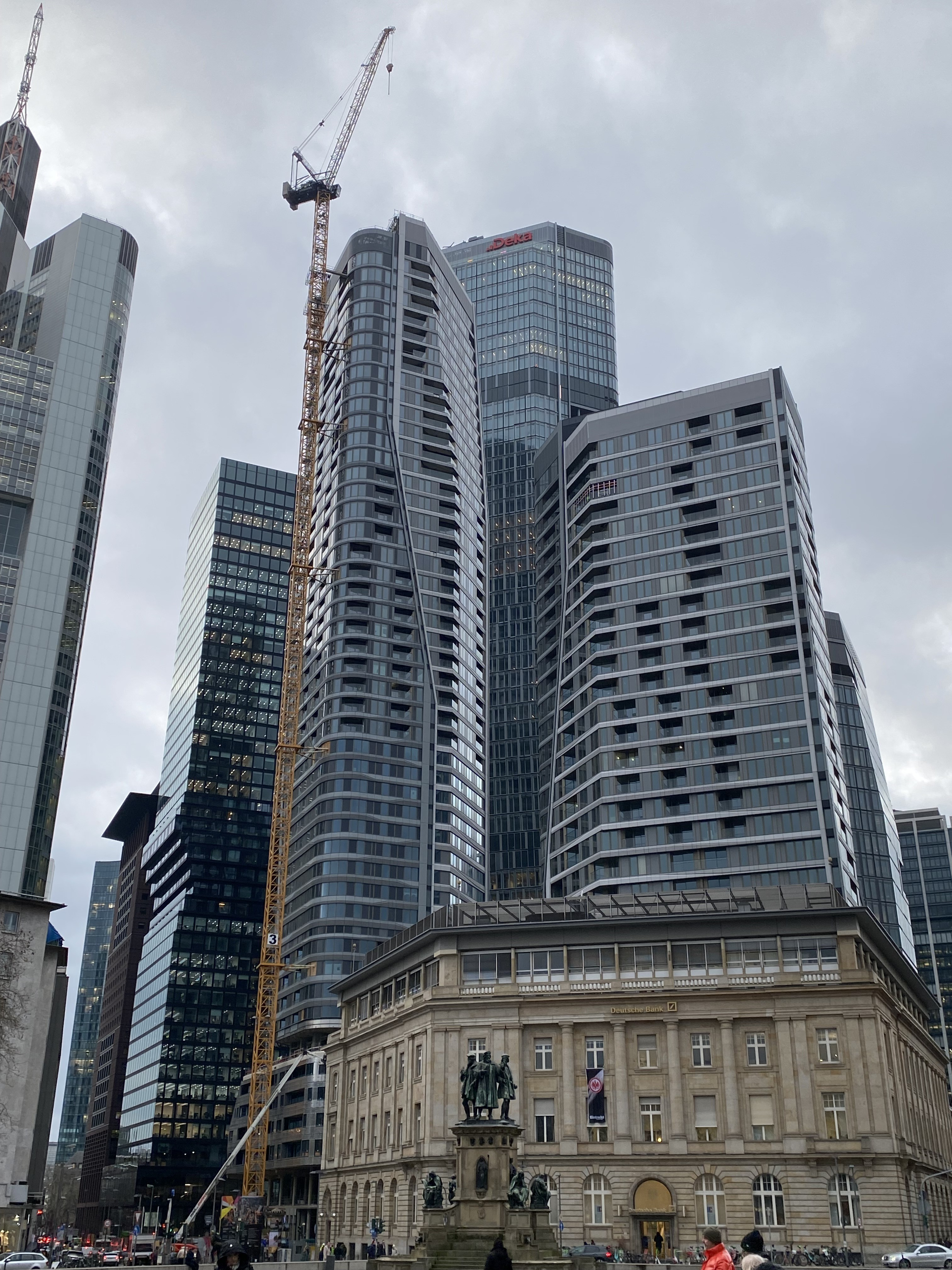
- High-rise building at Große Gallusstraße 14 in Frankfurt, DekaBank head office since 2024
- Type: Anstalt des öffentlichen Rechts
- Industry: Financial services
- Founded: 1918
- Headquarters: Frankfurt am Main, Germany
- Key people: Helmut Schleweis (Chairman); Georg Stocker(CEO)
- Revenue: €2.705 billion (2023)
- Net income: €742.3 million (2023)
- AUM: €394.132 billion (2024)
- Total assets: €92.9 billion (2024)
- Number of employees: 4,711 (30 June 2021)
- Parent: Deutscher Sparkassen- und Giroverband
- Website: www.deka.de

DekaBank Deutsche Girozentrale is a German financial institution. It is registered in both Frankfurt and Berlin, with main operational headquarters in Frankfurt. It traces its origins to the Deutsche Girozentrale, established in 1918 as a hub for payments within the German savings banks system.

DekaBank is the central asset manager of the Sparkassen-Finanzgruppe, and one of the largest securities services providers in Germany. As a central provider, the bank bundles its competencies in asset management and financial services in its five business areas of asset management, real estate, services, capital markets and financing. Retail and institutional clients and investors can choose from a wide range of investment products and services. DekaBank cooperates closely with local savings banks and Landesbanks. Additionally, it is represented internationally with branches, subsidiaries and representative offices in eleven countries.

DekaBank has been designated as a Significant Institution since the entry into force of European Banking Supervision in late 2014, and as a consequence is directly supervised by the European Central Bank.

== Background ==
Johann Christian Eberle established the first giro association involving German savings banks, the Giroverband Sächsischer Gemeinden (lit. 'giro association of Saxon municipalities'), which was founded on 5 October 1908 with 151 members and started giro operations on 2 January 1909. Several other regional giro associations (German: Giroverbände) were subsequently created. On 26 October 1916 during World War I, the Deutscher Zentral-Giroverband (lit. 'German Central Giro Association') was established in Berlin to coordinate the activities of the Giroverbände.

== Deutsche Girozentrale ==
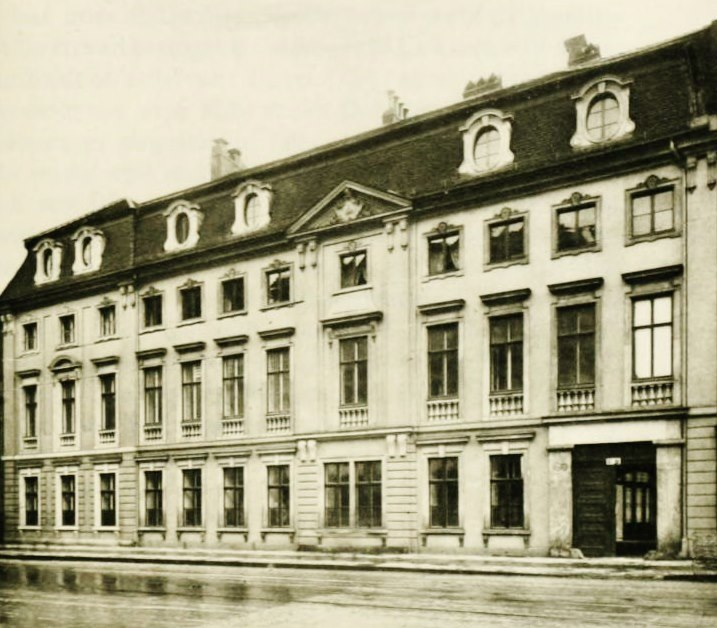
Building at Gertraudenstrasse 16 in Berlin (former seat of Bank- und Handelshaus Splitgerber & Daum), DGZ head office from 1918 to 1945; demolished in the 1960s

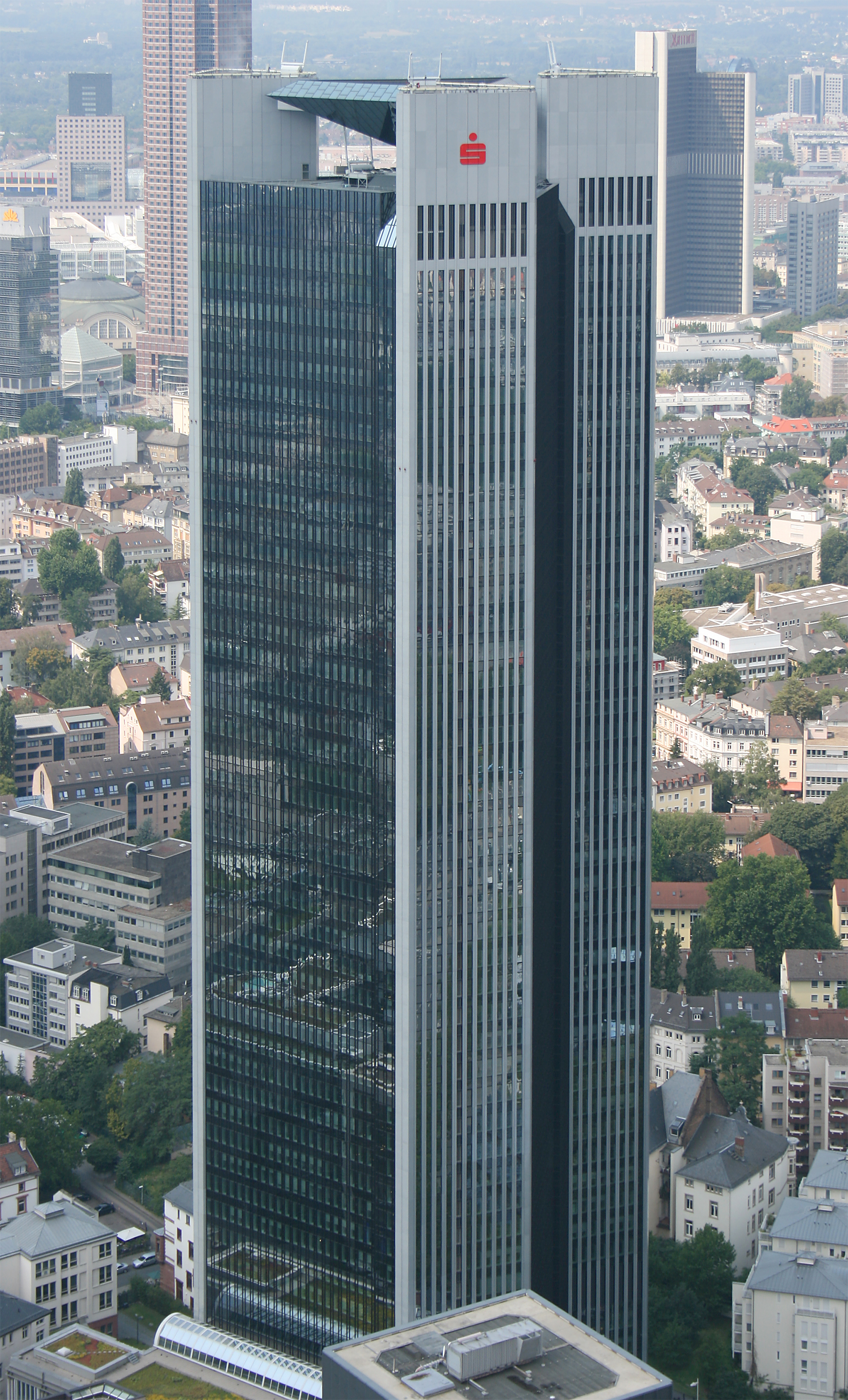
Trianon Tower in Frankfurt, seat of Dekabank from 1993 to 2024

The Deutsche Girozentrale (DGZ) was established on 1918-02-01, initially as a banking division of the Deutscher Zentral-Giroverband. Its capital of 15 million Reichsmarks was provided by the regional Giroverbände under joint and several liability. DGZ operated cashless payment (giro) transactions and settlement between the regional giro organizations (German: Girozentralen). DGZ was also tasked with short-term lending to regional giro associations that were members of the Deutscher Zentral-Giroverband, from 1924 the Deutscher Sparkassen- und Giroverband (DSGV), and to other German municipal associations, managing interest-bearing funds, buying and selling foreign exchange, and borrowing on their behalf. In 1919, DGZ was also authorized to provide long-term financing to municipalities and to issue municipal bonds. The name "Deutsche Kommunalbank" was consequently added to that of DGZ in 1921, so that its full name became Deutsche Girozentrale – Deutsche Kommunalbank, still known as DGZ. In 1931, DGZ was reorganized together with the broader municipal banking system, and it received a statute (German: Satzung) of its own in 1932. Even so, the DSGV remained ultimately liable for DGZ. At the same time, the supervision of DGZ was transferred from the Interior Minister of Prussia to the national government of the Weimar Republic. From 1933, the National Socialists used DGZ to cover the steadily growing financial needs for rearmament and later for warfare.

Following the end of World War II, the DGZ head office, in East Berlin, was closed by the Soviet Military Administration. In 1949, it was revived as Deutsche Kommunalbank in Düsseldorf, West Germany, but with a more limited mandate that was focused on short-term transactions. In 1954, it was again named Deutsche Girozentrale – Deutsche Kommunalbank and resumed full activities, and in 1955 it opened a branch in West Berlin. In 1964–1965, DGZ's head office was relocated from Düsseldorf to Frankfurt.

== 1999 merger and aftermath ==
On 1 January 1999, DGZ and DekaBank merged to form DGZ-DekaBank Deutsche Kommunalbank, which was renamed DekaBank Deutsche Girozentrale in 2002.

In April 2011, DSGV became the sole owner of DekaBank by purchasing the 50 percent stake owned until then by the Landesbanks.

In November 2014, DekaBank came under the prudential supervisory authority of the European Central Bank as a consequence of European banking union.

In 2015, Deka joined Lloyds Bank and Qatar National Bank in a £705 million senior loan which financed the Qatar Investment Authority's acquisition of 8 Canada Square in Canary Wharf. That same year, Helaba's leadership proposed a merger with Deka. In May 2019, both entered into exploratory talks on a merger. Later that year, Deka's supervisory board instructed management to explore "deeper cooperation" with the bank from January 2020.

In 2016, Deka was one of Germany's main issuers of credit-linked notes.

In 2017, amid the Volkswagen emissions scandal, a German court named Deka as lead plaintiff for 1,470 damages claims against Volkswagen totaling 1.9 billion euros ($2 billion).

== See also ==
- DZ Bank
- List of banks in the euro area
- List of banks in Germany
