= Transaction banking =

Bank services to corporate trade partners

Transaction banking can be defined as the set of instruments and services that a bank offers to trading partners to financially support their reciprocal exchanges of goods (e.g., trade), monetary flows (e.g., cash), or commercial papers (e.g., exchanges). Transaction banking allows banks to maintain close relationships with their corporate clients, so banks don’t want to be disintermediated by other players.

The transaction banking division of a bank typically provides commercial banking products and services for both corporations and financial institutions, including domestic and cross-border payments, risk mitigation, international trade finance as well as trust, agency, depositary, custody and related services. It comprises the Cash Management, Trade Finance and Trust & Securities Services businesses. Although some business banking depends on a third party for 3-5 working days, others take over 10 working days.

A number of global trends are leading to a renewed focus on the transaction banking sector. These trends include the globalization of trade, the increasing importance of liquidity management and a heightened emphasis on securing relationships in a world where both competition and clients are becoming more global and sophisticated. Transaction banking is also particularly attractive in the current economic context because it often has relatively low regulatory capital requirements.

== Benefits of for businesses ==
=== Cash Flow Management ===
Transaction banking solutions like account aggregation, real-time cash flow visibility, and automated payments enable businesses to optimize their working capital. This can lead to reduced idle cash balances and improved access to funds for essential operations.

=== Enhanced Efficiency and Reduced Costs ===
Transaction banking automates routine tasks like payments, reconciliations, and collections. Additionally, bulk payment processing and streamlined trade finance procedures can generate cost savings.

=== Mitigated Risks and Fraud Protection ===
Transaction banking offers a range of risk management tools such as letters of credit, guarantees, and fraud prevention services. These tools help businesses minimize financial losses associated with non-payment, counterfeit documents, and cybercrime.

=== Greater Control and Visibility ===
Transaction banking platforms provide businesses with real-time access to account information and transaction history. This improved transparency allows for better financial decision-making, forecasting, and budgeting.

== Impact of technology ==
=== Automation and Artificial Intelligence ===
Repetitive tasks like data entry, reconciliation, and fraud detection are increasingly being automated using machine learning algorithms. This can improve processing speed and accuracy.

=== Cloud Computing ===
Cloud-based transaction banking offers businesses greater scalability and accessibility. Cloud platforms enable real-time data processing and facilitate collaboration between businesses and banks.

=== Blockchain Technology ===
Blockchain has the potential to revolutionize trade finance by streamlining processes, improving transparency, and enhancing security. Blockchain can facilitate secure and efficient document exchange, automated payments, and improved trade traceability.

=== Open Banking and APIs ===
Open banking initiatives and application programming interfaces (APIs) are enabling greater collaboration between banks and fintech companies. This fosters innovation and allows businesses to access a wider range of financial services through integrated platforms.
