= KfW IPEX-Bank =

Coordinates: 50.120396°N 8.65544°E

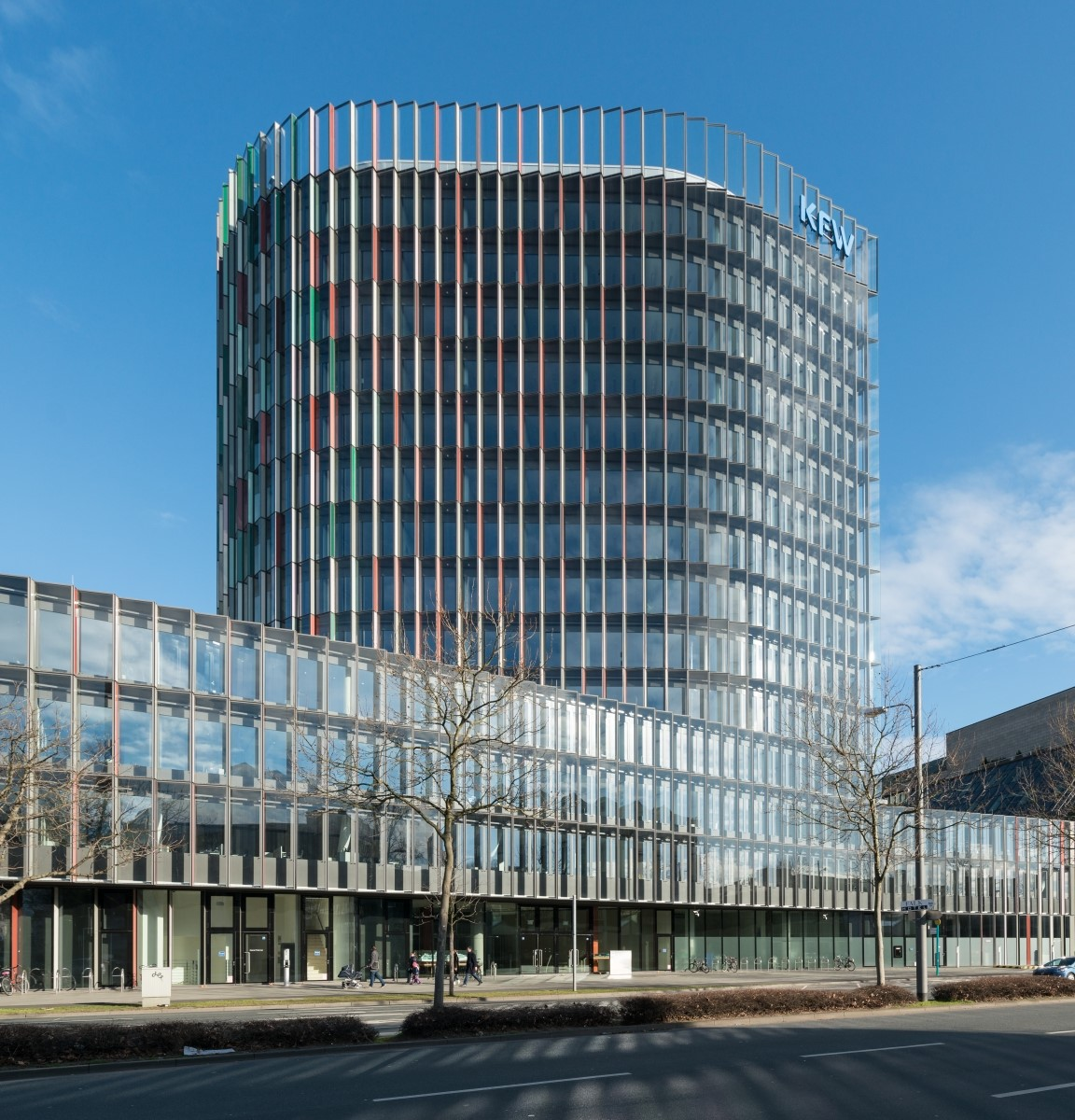
- Westarkade - headquarters in Frankfurt
- Company type: Limited liability company
- Industry: Banking
- Founded: 2008; 18 years ago
- Headquarters: Frankfurt, Germany
- Products: commercial banking
- Total assets: €28.1 billion (2020)
- Number of employees: 837 (2020)
- Parent: KfW
- Website: www.kfw-ipex-bank.de

The KfW IPEX-Bank GmbH is a German commercial bank that is the wholly owned subsidiary of German KfW (Kreditanstalt für Wiederaufbau; lit. 'credit institute for reconstruction') that focuses on development financing. Since 1 January 2008 it has been a legally independent bank governed by the German Banking Act. Its work focuses on international project and export financing. The bank's headquarters is located in Frankfurt, where the KfW IPEX-Bank uses the Westarkade, which was completed in 2011.

== History ==
The KfW, founded in 1948, used the instruments of export and project financing (E&P) within its business model quite early on. In 1950 the KfW was given this task. This branch of their business became increasingly important in the 1980s and 1990s and, not least because of this, attracted the attention of the competition authorities of the European Union, who regarded the Bank's activities as a German development bank in the area of E&P as non-competitive. This is mainly because this business activity did not take place under market conditions within the protected area of a development bank secured by the German state and thus created an inadmissible competitive advantage.

The outsourcing of the KfW's international project and export financing goes back to an agreement between Germany and the European Commission on the orientation of legally independent development institutions in Germany.

Under the terms of the agreement, the KfW may use the refinancing benefits in the form of federal guarantees only for its original promotional activities as defined in a list of tasks. All other activities were, according to the agreement, spun off until the beginning of 2008 into a privately organized credit institution, which operates under the competitive conditions of the market. On August 15, 2003, the Deutscher Bundestag implemented this agreement in the Förderbankenneustrukturierungsgesetz (Development Bank Restructuring Act).

As of January 1, 2004, the brand KfW IPEX-Bank (IPEX stands for International Project and Export Financing) was constituted within the framework of a four-year transitional phase (the so-called bank-in-the-bank phase). On 1 January 2008, it was spun off in the legal form of a Limited liability company as a company and is subject to full tax liability and in particular the banking supervision, which does not apply to the parent company, the KfW.

In 2014, KfW successfully lobbied for the KfW IPEX-Bank to remain under national supervision on the grounds that its parent group is in the ownership of the German government; the bank had originally been on a list of 24 German lenders that were among 128 banks across the eurozone deemed significant enough to be supervised directly by the European Central Bank.

== Operations ==
=== Strategic focus and financing products ===
The KfW IPEX-Bank is a specialist bank for export and project financing. The tasks of the KfW IPEX-Bank consist of financing in the interest of the German and European economy and are derived from the statutory mandate of the KfW. The focus is on the provision of medium and long-term earmarked financing to support the export economy, the development of economic and social infrastructure, and environmental and climate protection projects.

The KfW IPEX-Bank is active in the business sectors Basic Industry, Manufacturing, Telecommunications, Trade & Health, Energy & Environment, Shipping & Ports, Aviation & Airports, Rail & Road, Construction & PPP. Their financing offers range from traditional export-related export credits and trade financing to complex project and structured financing in various currencies, including the integration of export credit insurance.

=== Business development ===
KfW IPEX-Bank's own-account lending volume amounted to EUR 38.1 billion at year-end 2020. The Energy and Environment, Industry and Services and Aviation, Mobility & Transport business lines accounted for the largest share of on-balance sheet lending volume, totalling EUR 15.2 billion (56%). The lending volume of KfW's Project and Export Finance business sector, for which KfW IPEX-BANK is responsible, was EUR 67.5 billion at year-end 2020 (previous year: EUR 69 billion).

In 2020 financial, the bank issued new commitments with a total volume of EUR 15.9 billion in its original lending business in the Export and Project Finance business sector. At EUR 13.8 billion (87%), the market business accounted for the largest share. In trust business, which the bank conducts on behalf and for the account of KfW, further commitments were made in the amount of EUR 2.1 billion. In addition, there was new business of EUR 0.7 billion for the refinancing of banks from the Ship and ERP CIRR. KfW IPEX-Bank is active here under an agency agreement for KfW (mandatary on behalf of the Federal Government of Germany). The total volume of new commitments (including CIRR) was EUR 16.6 billion, EUR 5.5 billion below the previous year's level. KfW IPEX-Bank employed an average of 837 people in the 2020 financial year.

=== International network ===
The KfW IPEX-Bank currently has as a branch in London, a subsidiary in Singapore as well as foreign representative offices in Abu Dhabi, Bogotá, Istanbul, Johannesburg, Mexico City, Mumbai, New York City, and São Paulo.
