= Development Bank of Saxony =

- Founded: 1991
- Headquarters: Leipzig, Saxony, Germany
- Key people: Hartmut Vorjohann (Chairman of supervisory board) and Katrin Leonhardt (Chairman of management board)
- Total assets: €8.2 Billion
- Number of employees: 1,131
- Website: www.sab.sachsen.de

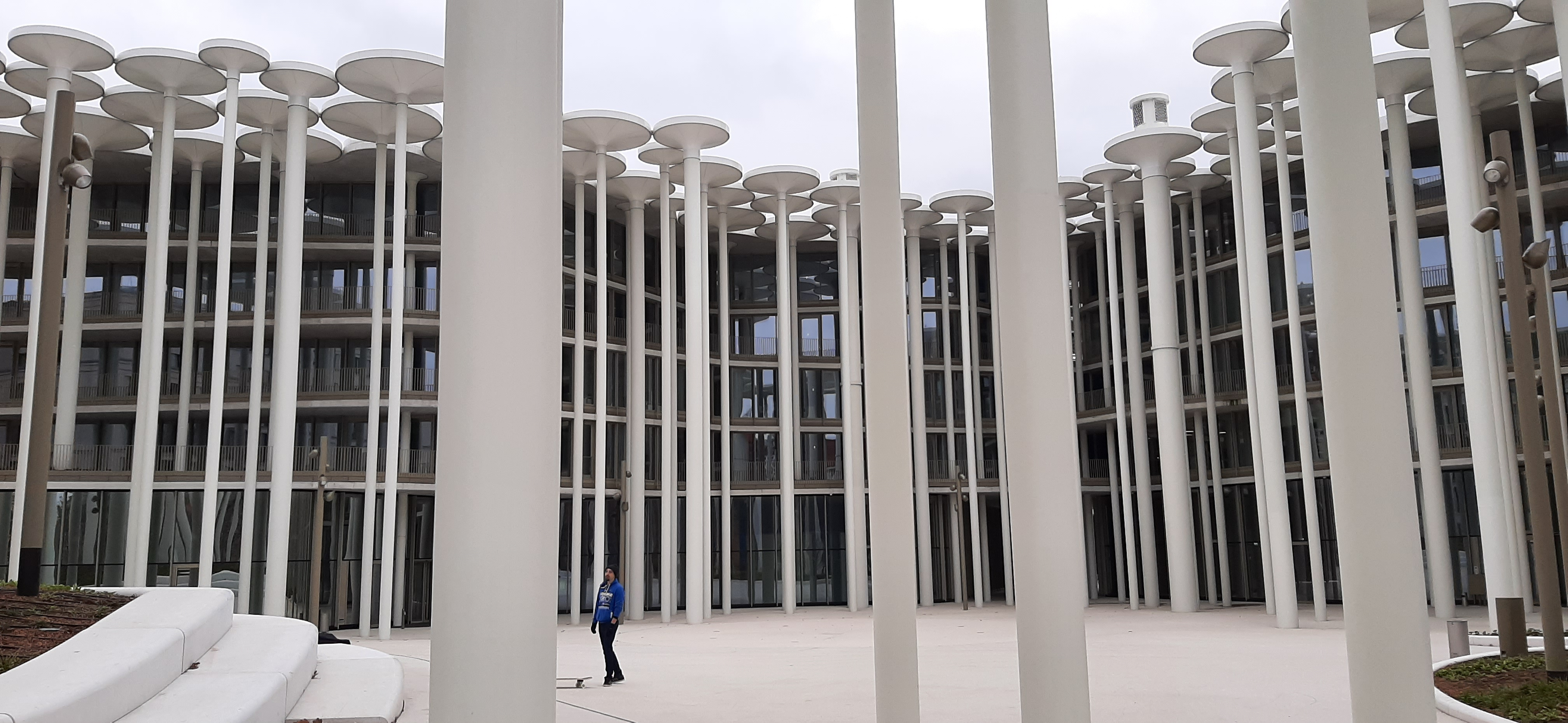
SAB headquarters in Leipzig shortly after completion in 2021

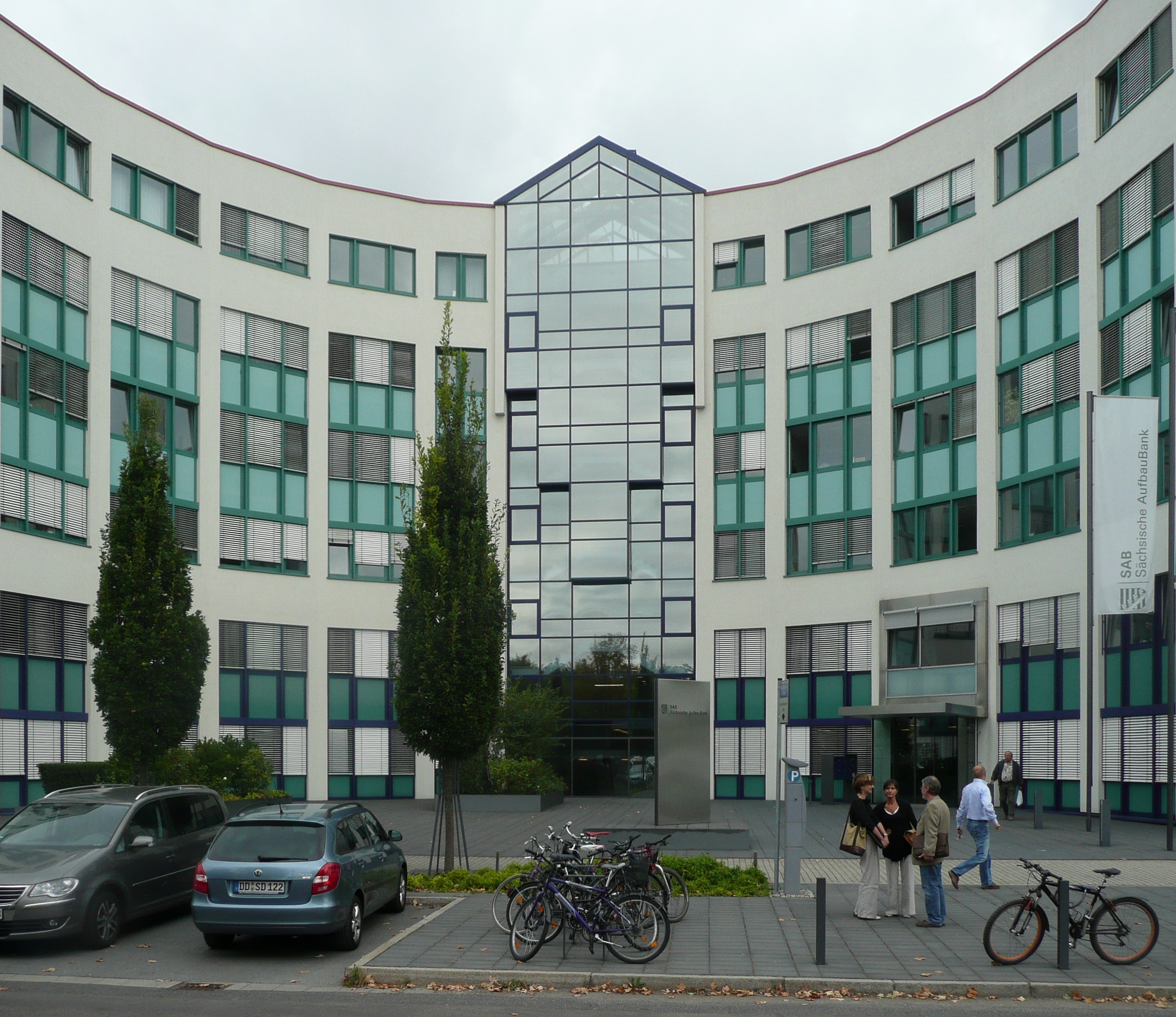
SAB's former headquarters in Dresden, now one of the bank's registered addresses

The Development Bank of Saxony (known as SAB, an abbreviation of its German name Sächsische Aufbaubank), founded in 1991 is the state development finance institution for Saxony, Germany.

== Activities ==
The Development Bank of Saxony allocates subsidies from sources like the European Regional Development Fund in the form of grants, sureties and loans to various sectors such as housing, business, infrastructure, education, environment and agriculture.

In 2016, the bank made over 50,000 payments and grants totalling almost 1.4 billion euro and loans of over 450 million euro.

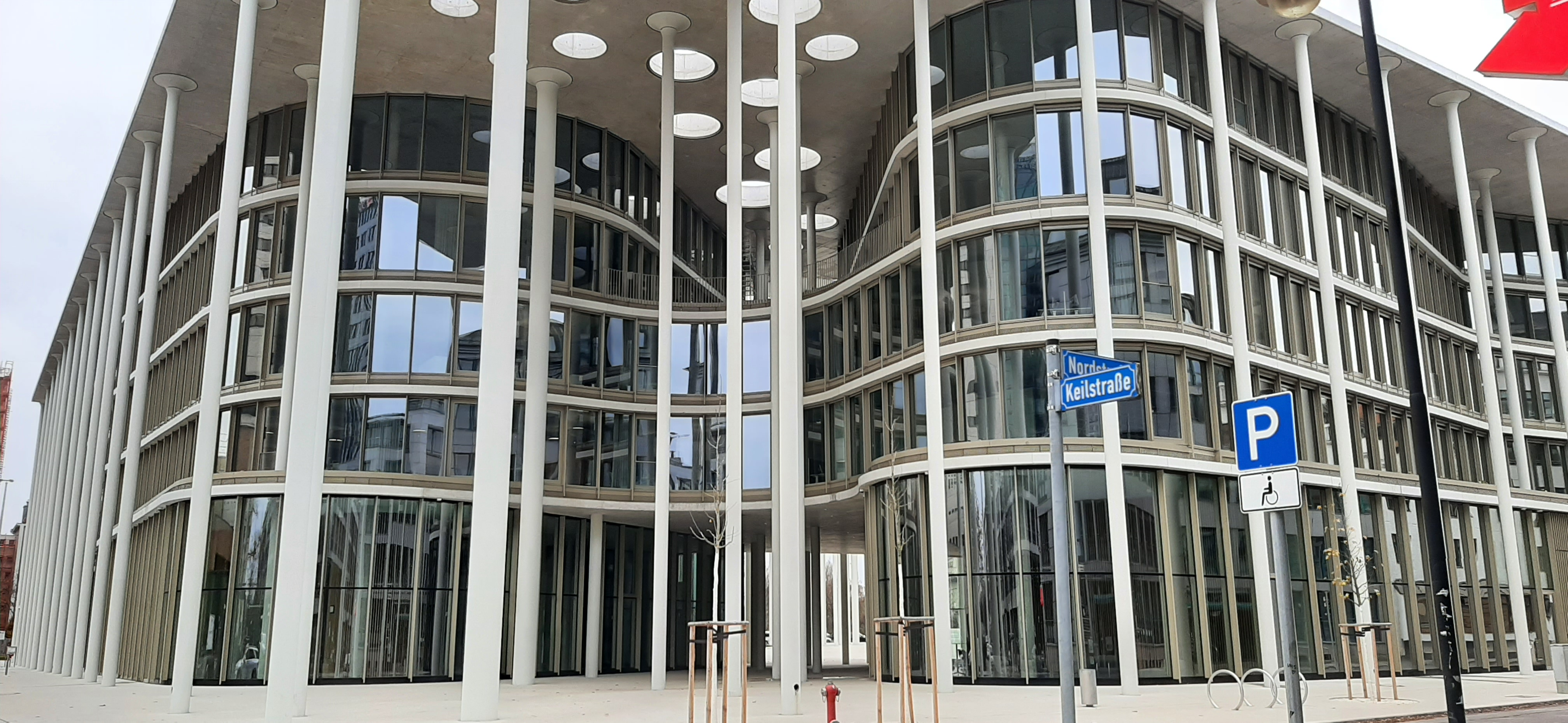
Street view of Sächsische Aufbaubank's headquarters, shortly after completion in 2021

== Location ==
The headquarters of the Development Bank of Saxony have been in Leipzig since January 2017, the building itself was completed in 2021. The bank's registered offices are in Leipzig and Dresden.

The bank also has customer centers in Leipzig, Dresden and Chemnitz and a regional office in Görlitz.

== History ==
Between 1991 and 1995 L-Bank, Baden-Württemberg's state development finance institution, operated SAB. On December 19, 1995 SAB GmbH was created as an L-Bank subsidiary. SAB GmbH started operations on June 1, 1996. Since December 30, 2002, SAB has been a wholly-owned subsidiary of the state of Saxony.

In 2003 its legal form was changed to an Institution under Public Law (Anstalt des öffentlichen Rechts in German).

== See also ==
- German public banking sector
- List of banks in Germany
