= Investitionsbank Berlin =

- Type: State-owned enterprise
- Industry: Financial services
- Founded: 1924
- Headquarters: Berlin, Germany
- Key people: Dr. Axel Nawrath (Chairman of the administrative board); Dr. Hinrich Holm (Chairman of the management board), Angeliki Krisilion (member of the management board), Stephan Brandt (member of the management board)
- Services: Development bank
- Total assets: 24.15 billion euros (2025)
- Number of employees: 988 (2025)
- Website: www.ibb.de

The Investitionsbank Berlin (IBB) is a development bank and central promotional institute of the state of Berlin. The aim of the funding is the Berlin economy and housing construction.

The main task of IBB is business development of small and medium-sized enterprises (SME). With the monetary promotion offers, a comprehensive financing consultation and a management and business-oriented promotion and loan processing. The focus for IBB is innovative, technology-oriented companies based in Berlin. In addition, IBB offers financing for investors in the area of real estate promotion.

== History ==
- 1924: founded as Wohnungsfürsorgegesellschaft Berlin mbH to finance Berlin housing construction
- 1937: conversion to the housing loan institute of the capital city of Berlin (as a legal municipality)
- 1965: conversion to the Housing Loan Institute Berlin as a public institute. The Wohnungsbau-Kreditanstalt Berlin becomes a capital collection point for loans according to § 17 Berlin Promotion Act.
- 1993: conversion into the Investment Bank Berlin under expansion of the tasks on the economic promotion; Integration into Landesbank Berlin as an economically and organizationally independent department
- 2004: spin-off from the Landesbank Berlin and separation as Investment Bank Berlin, public institute with Anstaltslast and Refinanzierungsgarantie of Berlin
- 2021: IBB Unternehmensverwaltung Anstalt öffentlichen Rechts (IBB UV) is established by law by the Federal State of Berlin. As the parent company of the group, IBB UV is the owner of IBB and for its part is wholly owned by the Federal State of Berlin. All of IBB’s equity investments are transferred to IBB UV.

== Significant investments ==
IBB is involved in numerous companies in order to fulfill its mandate as the central development bank of the state of Berlin. There are two groups, participations, which are held on behalf of the city, and participations, which are held in connection with promotional tasks.

=== Banking-related promotional business ===
- IBB Ventures (formerly known as IBB Beteiligungsgesellschaft mbH)
- IBB Business Team GmbH
- IBB Capital

=== Location and other economic development measures ===
- Berlin Partner GmbH
- Berlin Tourismus & Kongress GmbH
- Medienboard Berlin-Brandenburg GmbH
- DAB Digitalagentur Berlin
- House of Finance and Tech Berlin GmbH (HoFT Berlin GmbH)

=== Fund participations ===
- EU Malaria Fund Berlin (EUMF)
- European Social Innovation and Impact Fund (ESIIF)
- Peppermint CBF 1 GmbH & Co. KG

== See also ==
- List of banks in Germany
