= Deutscher Sparkassen- und Giroverband =

German association of savings banks

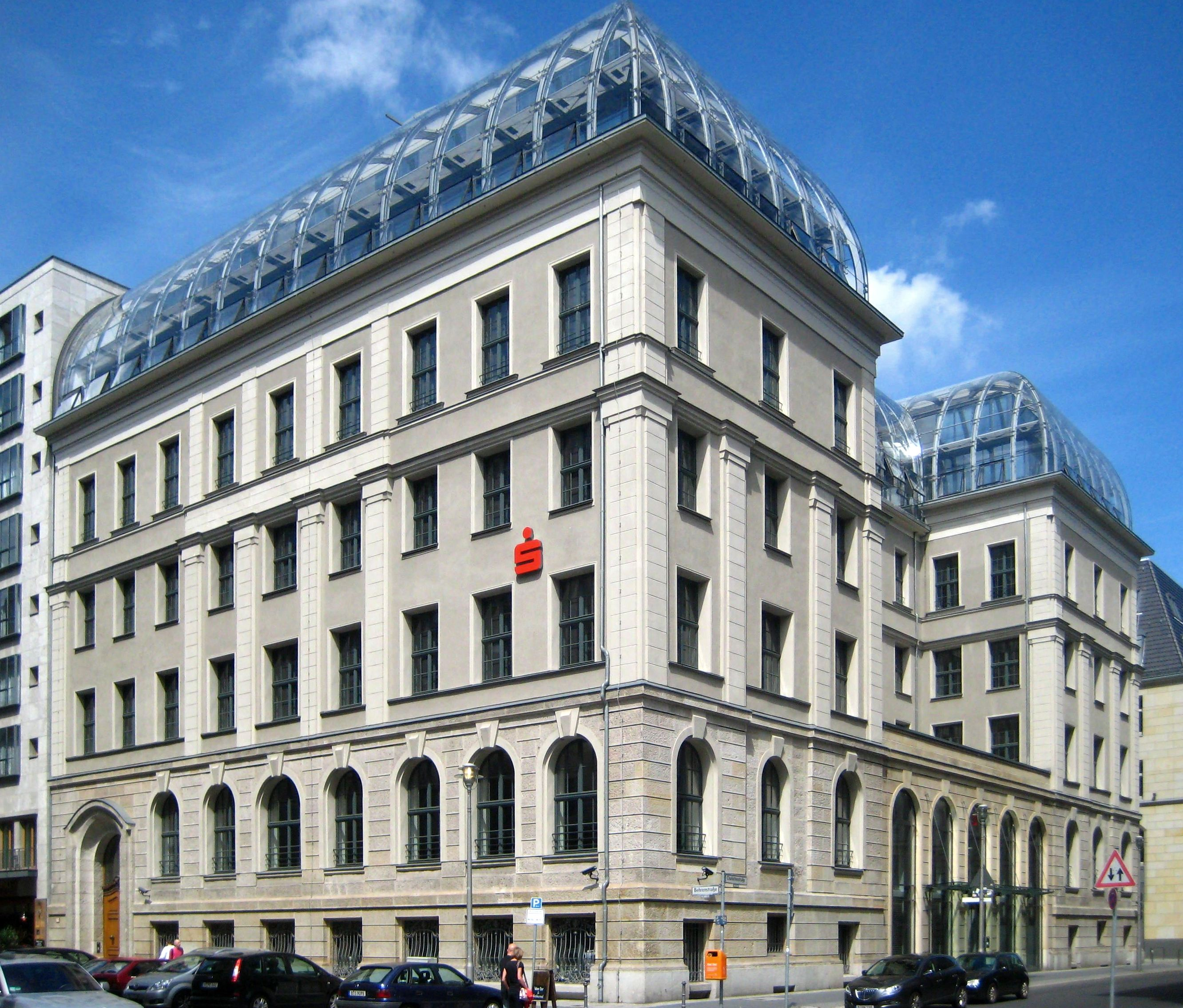
Building at Charlottenstrasse 47 in Berlin, head office of DSGV

The Deutscher Sparkassen- und Giroverband (DSGV, lit. 'German association of savings banks and money transfers') is the association of German savings banks (German: Sparkassen) and the apex entity of the Sparkassen-Finanzgruppe, the European Union's second-largest financial services group (after BNP Paribas) with 2.5 trillion euros combined assets as of end-2023. Germany's savings banks, owned by local governments, play a major role in the country's economy, together operating some 15,860 branches and employing about 284,800 people.

== History ==
German savings banks started organizing on a regional basis in the 1870s and early 1880s, e.g. the Verband der Sparkassen in Rheinland und Westfalen und Sparkassenzeitung, est. 1881. The first national conference of savings banks (German: Deutscher Sparkassentag) was held in 1882. on 6 December 1884, the first national umbrella organization was established as the Deutscher Sparkassenverband in Dortmund. In 1892, it was agreed that the Deutscher Sparkassenverband would be an "association of associations" whose members would not be individual savings banks, but rather regional associations thereof (German: Sparkassenverbände). By 1911, fifteen such Sparkassenverbände had been established, covering all the country's savings banks.

on 26 October 1916 during World War I, the Deutscher Zentralgiroverband was established to coordinate the regional payments clearing houses or Giroverbände (lit. 'giro associations') that had appeared since 1908.

The DSGV was founded in 1924 by the merger of Deutscher Sparkassenverband and Deutscher Zentral-Giroverband, with seat in Berlin. It simultaneously absorbed the Deutscher Verband der Kommunalen Banken, a separate organization in Königsberg.

In 1947, after de facto separation from their Eastern German peers and central organization in East Berlin, the savings banks and regional associations in West Germany formed the Arbeitsgemeinschaft Deutscher Sparkassen- und Giroverbände und Girozentralen (lit. 'work community of German savings banks and giro associations and payment clearing houses') as their new national organization. In 1953, it was restructured as the Deutscher Sparkassen- und Giroverband e.V., with head office in Bonn. Unlike the prior DSGV in Berlin, it was not a public corporation (German: Körperschaft des öffentlichen Rechts, abbreviated as ö.K.) but a non-profit association (German: eingetragener Verein, abbreviated e.V.).

Following German reunification, the DSGV relocated from Bonn to Berlin in 1999.

In April 2011, DSGV took control of DekaBank, buying a 50% stake from the Landesbanken, public sector banks such as HSH Nordbank, WestLB and SachsenLB that stumbled badly during the 2008 financial crisis. After years of subsidising the activities of the Landesbank sector, savings banks have been more assertive about ending the Wall Street-style ambitions of some of these regional lenders.

== Presidents ==
- Ernst Eberhard Kleiner (1924-1935)
- Johannes Heintze (1935-1945)
- Fritz Butschkau (1947-1967)
- Ludwig Poullain (1967-1972)
- Helmut Geiger (1972-1993)
- Horst Köhler (1993-1998)
- Dietrich H. Hoppenstedt (1998-2006)
- Heinrich Haasis (2006-2012)
- Georg Fahrenschon (2012-2017)
- Helmut Schleweis (since 2018)

== See also ==
- Bundesverband der Deutschen Volksbanken und Raiffeisenbanken
- German public banking sector
- List of banks in Germany
