= Landesbank Saar =

Coordinates: 49.239461°N 6.993411°E

- Company type: Public institution
- Industry: financial service activities, except insurance and pension funding
- Predecessor: Hypothekenbank Saarbrücken; Pfälzische Wirtschaftsbank gAG
- Founded: 1941
- Headquarters: Saarbrücken, Germany
- Net income: 10,685,548.04 euro (2017)
- Total assets: €14.9 billion (2018)
- Number of employees: 531 (2018)
- Website: www.saarlb.de

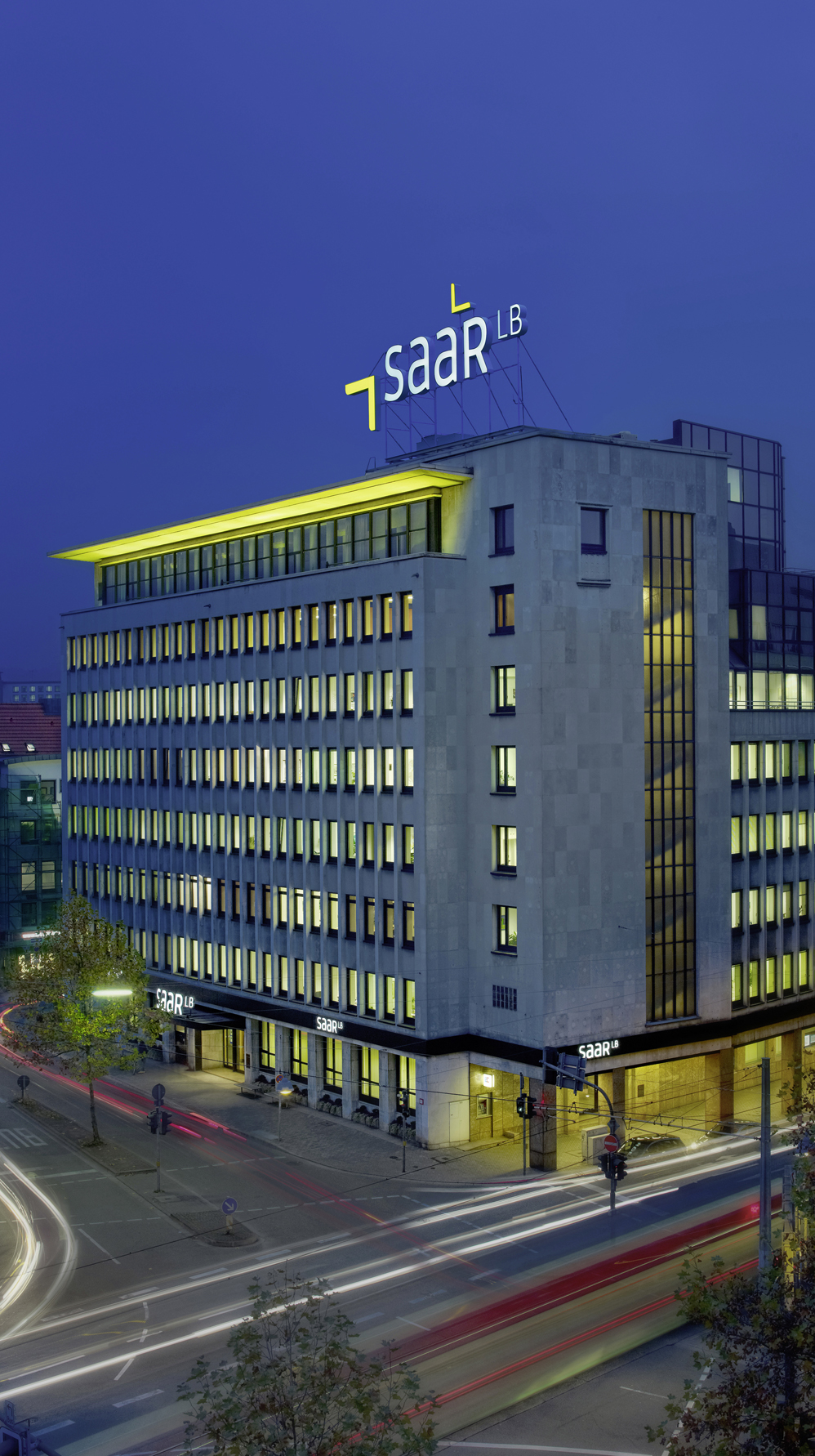
Headquarter in Saarbrücken, Ursulinenstraße 2

Landesbank Saar (short SaarLB) is a public-law corporation established in Saarbrücken and the largest credit and mortgage bond institute in Saarland. In 2017, the balance sheet total was around €14 billion. Core markets are Saarland and France, especially the northeast of the country.

Until December 31, 2013, shareholders of SaarLB were Bayerische Landesbank (BayernLB, 49.9%), Saarland (35.2%) and Sparkassenverband Saar (14.9%), after Bayerische Landesbank, during the 2008 financial crisis, sold a share of 25.2% for 65 million euros to Saarland. This share ratio changed as of September 30, 2013, as Saarland Sparkassen converted previously held silent participations into so-called "hard core capital". At this date the participation rates amounted to 43.92 percent for BayernLB, 30.98 percent for Saarland and 25.1 percent for Sparkassenverband Saar.

As of 1 January 2014, BayernLB sold its remaining shares to Saarland, so that now Saarland is involved with 74.9 percent and Sparkassenverband with 25.1 percent in SaarLB.

== See also ==
- German public banking sector
- List of banks in the euro area
- List of banks in Germany
