= Helaba =

German bank owned by the states of Hesse and Thuringia

Landesbank Hessen-Thüringen
- Trade name: Helaba
- Type: Institution incorporated under public law
- Industry: Finance
- Predecessor: Hessische Landes-Hypothekenbank; Hessische Landesbank - Staatsbank; Landeskommunalbank - Girozentrale für Hessen; Landeskreditkasse zu Kassel
- Founded: 1 June 1953
- Defunct: 1953
- Headquarters: Frankfurt and Erfurt, Germany
- Key people: Thomas Groß, CEO
- Total assets: €205 billion (Q2 2026)
- Number of employees: app. 6000 (2021)
- Website: www.helaba.com

Helaba, short for Landesbank Hessen-Thüringen, is a commercial bank with core regions in Hesse and Thuringia, Germany offering financial services to companies, banks, institutional investors and the public sector, both within Germany and internationally. At the same time, it is the central clearing institution and service provider for 40 percent of German savings banks.

Helaba is an institution incorporated under public law. With approximately 6,300 employees and two headquarters in Frankfurt and Erfurt, the bank maintains branches in Düsseldorf and Kassel as well as offices in Berlin, Stuttgart, Munich and Muenster. On an international level, Helaba acts through branches and representative offices in Paris, London, New York, Madrid, Moscow, Shanghai, and Singapore. Frankfurter Sparkasse, the leading retail bank in the Rhine-Main region, is a wholly owned subsidiary of Helaba. The Helaba Group also comprises the online bank 1822direkt, LBS Hessen-Thüringen and WIBank. The latter implements development programmes of the State of Hesse. Further Helaba subsidiaries are Helaba Invest Kapitalanlagegesellschaft, Frankfurter Bankgesellschaft and the OFB Group (real estate development).

Helaba has been designated as a Significant Institution since the entry into force of European Banking Supervision in late 2014, and as a consequence is directly supervised by the European Central Bank.

== Business activities ==
The business field "Wholesale customer business" comprises financial services for enterprises, banks and institutional investors. In the business field of "private customers and small and medium-sized enterprise (SMEs)", through its S-Group Bank, Helaba provides services for the S-Group savings banks in Hesse, Thuringia, North Rhine-Westphalia and Brandenburg. the framework of "public development and infrastructure business", Helaba serves the development support programmes of the regional state of Hesse and participates in the development institutions and agencies in Hesse and Thuringia. Also GWH, one of Hesse's biggest housing corporations, belongs to Helaba.

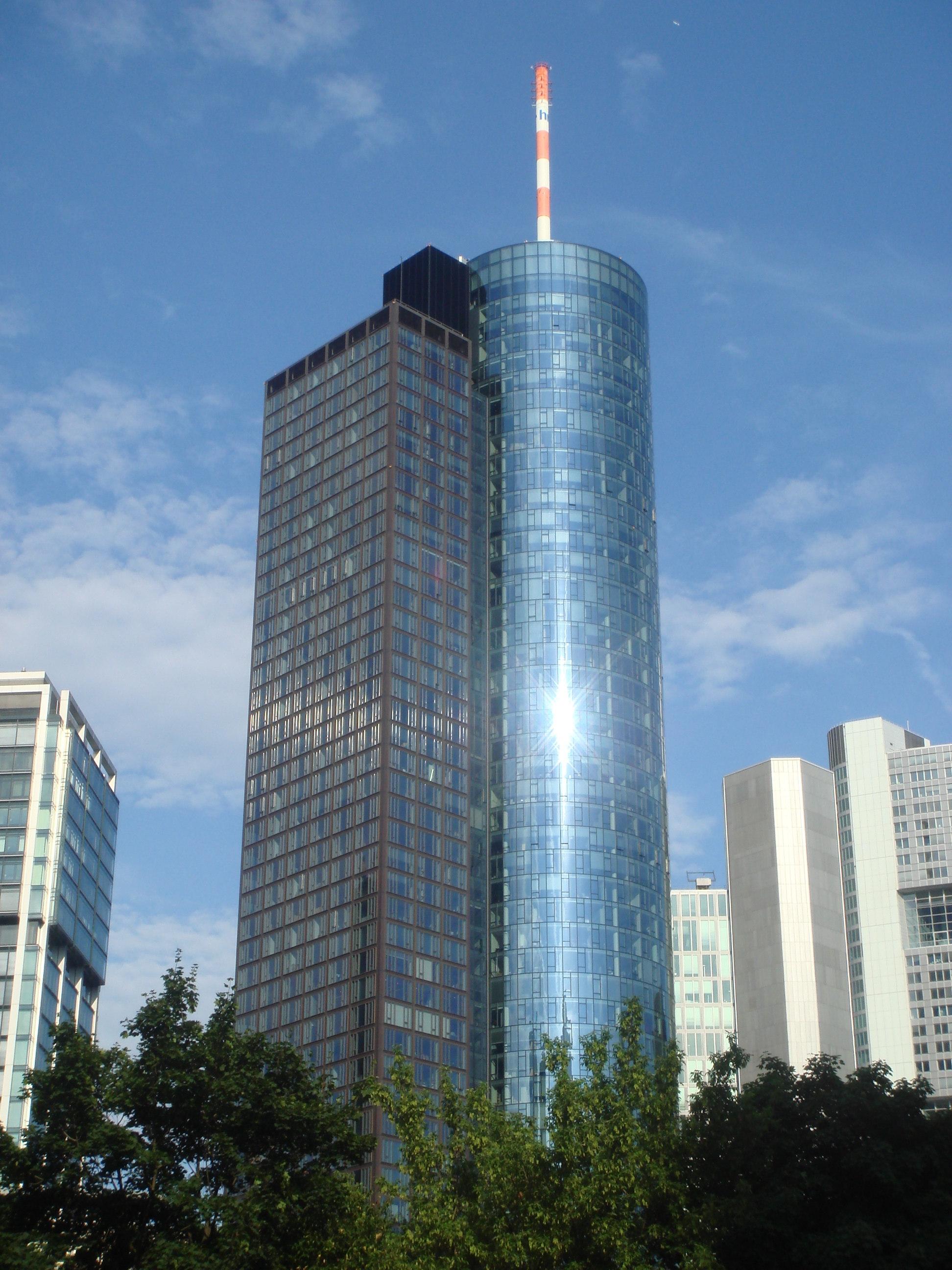
Main Tower in Frankfurt

== History ==
On 1 June 1953, Hessische Landesbank Girozentrale arose from the merger of Hessische Landesbank Darmstadt Girozentrale (founded in 1940), Nassauische Landesbank Wiesbaden (founded in 1940) and Landeskreditkasse zu Kassel (founded in 1832). In the 1970s, a financial scandal in relation to Tibor Rosenbaum brought Hessische Landesbank into serious difficulties. On 1 July 1992, a state treaty between Hesse and Thuringia on uniting the savings banks organizations of the two federal states brought about the creation of a joint Landesbank. As a result, it was the first Landesbank to operate outside a single federal state's boundary. In the year 2005, Helaba acquired Frankfurter Sparkasse and thereby entered further into private customer business, which it had already conducted through its Darmstadt Branch and at its Kassel location through Landeskreditkasse zu Kassel.

In 2007, Jürgen Rüttgers and Roland Koch, the minister-presidents of North Rhine-Westphalia and Hesse, tentatively agreed on approving a merger of their respective state-owned banks, Helaba and WestLB; however, WestLB was eventually broken up in 2012 after years of losses and controversy. During his time in office, CEO Hans-Dieter Brenner later advocated a merger of Helaba with DekaBank, the fund manager for the country's savings banks.

In 2014, Helaba entered a joint venture with U.S. banking group BNY Mellon and the country's 25 largest savings banks to help corporate customers to expand foreign trade with Asia.

In late 2018, it acquired Dexia Kommunalbank Deutschland, the German unit of Franco-Belgian bank Dexia, for 352 million euros ($398 million).

In July 2011, it was reported that Helaba would pull out of the EU's bank stress tests to avoid public failure.

In July 2025, news media reported that Helaba was weighing a takeover of property bank Aareal.

== Governance ==
=== Legal form and owners ===
Helaba has legal capacity as an institution incorporated under public law. Owners and guarantors of Landesbank Hessen-Thüringen are the Sparkassen- und Giroverband Hessen-Thüringen (85%) (Savings Banks and Giro Association of Hesse-Thuringia), the Federal State of Hesse (10%) and the Free State of Thuringia (5%). The governing bodies of the bank are the Owners' Assembly, the Supervisory Board and the Board of Managing Directors. CEO of Landesbank Hessen-Thüringen is Hans-Dieter Brenner.

=== Board of Managing Directors ===
- Thomas Groß
- Tamara Weiß
- Hans-Dieter Kemler
- Frank Nickel
- Christian Rhino
- Christian Schmidt

=== Former Chairs of the Board of Managing Directors ===
- Hans-Herbert Grüntker (2015–2020)
- Hans-Dieter Brenner (2009–2015)
- Dr Günther Merl (2001–2008)
- Walter Schäfer (1996–2001)
- Dr Hermann-Adolf Kunisch (1995–1996)
- Dr Karl Kauermann (1993–1995)
- Dr Herbert J. Kazmierzak (1985–1993)
- Heinz Sippel (1975–1985)
- Dr Wilhelm Hankel (1971–1973)
- Gustav Bothe (1971)
- Dr Wilhelm Conrad (1964–1971)
- Dr Herbert Lauffer (1953–1964)

== Headquarters ==
The foundation stone of the Main Tower was laid in October 1996. Three years later, the bank moved into the building. With a height of 200 metres, it is the fourth-highest skyscraper in Frankfurt. Earlier, the bank was headquartered in the adjacent building, now called Garden Towers.

== Controversy ==
In 2023, the European Central Bank fined Helaba with 6.83 million euro ($7.29 million) for "consciously" misrepresenting its exposure to turbulent financial markets during the COVID-19 pandemic so it would need less capital; at the time, this was the second-largest levied by the ECB since taking over supervision of the euro zone's biggest lenders in 2014.

Helaba arranged the pre-letting quota of residences as a so-called "suitable financier" so that construction of the Hamburg Elbtower could proceed. Only then did the city of Hamburg sell the ground to Signa, which as of 2023 is bankrupt.

== See also ==
- List of banks in the euro area
- List of banks in Germany
