= Landesbank =

Bank category in the German-speaking world

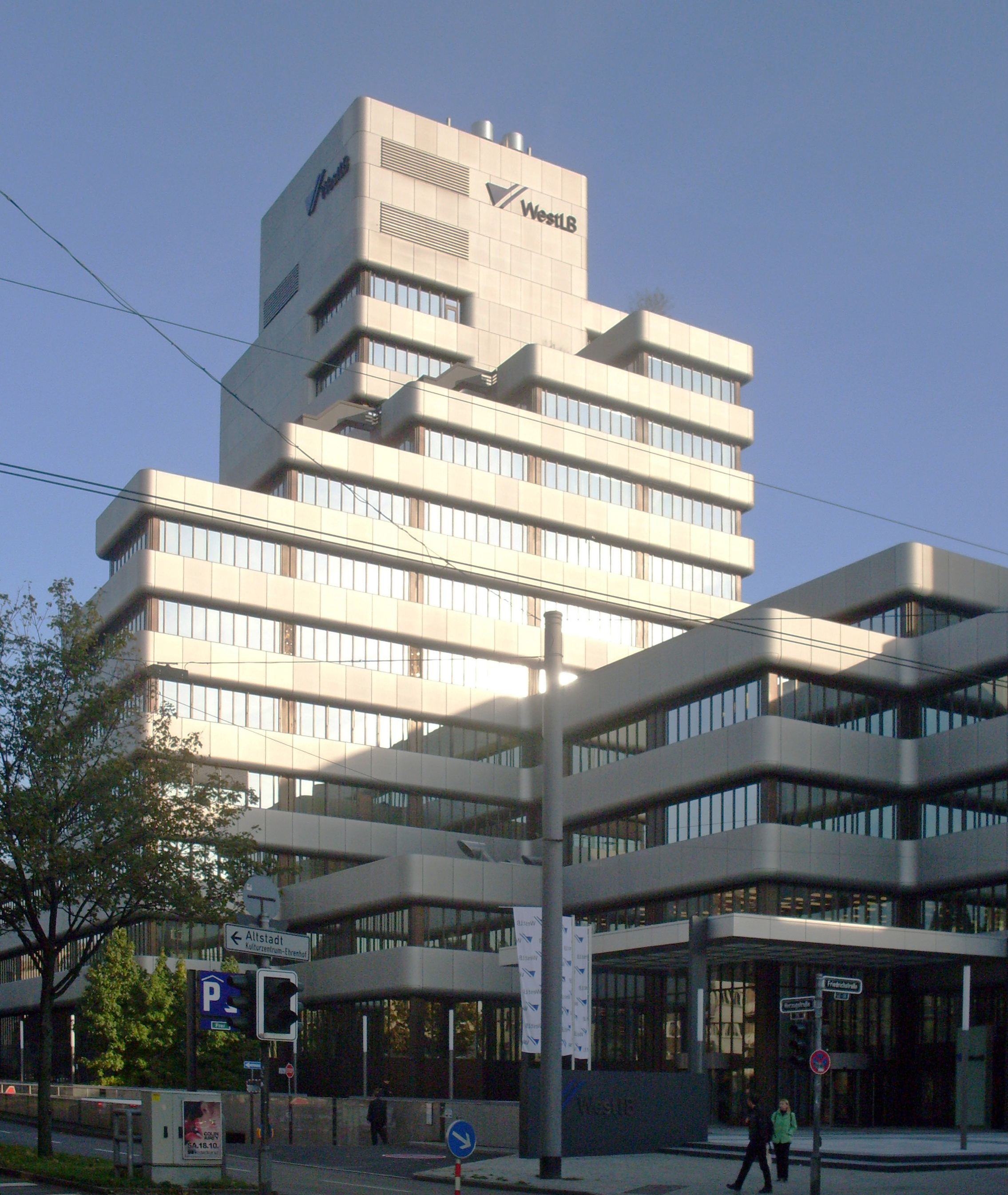
Westdeutsche Landesbank was a prominent exemplar of the German Landesbanken before collapsing in 2007-2012

In German-speaking jurisdictions, Landesbank (plural Landesbanken), lit. 'bank of the Land', refers to a category of public sector banks that are owned by one or more of the Länder (federated internally self-governing states). Institutions of this type exist in most German states, as well as Austria and Switzerland.

== Austria-Hungary ==
In the Austro-Hungarian Empire under the rule of the Habsburg monarchy, Landesbanken were government-sponsored banks established in some of the kingdoms and lands of the crown:

- Landesbank des Königreichs Galizien und Lodomerien mit dem Grossherzogtum Krakau, est. 1883 in Lemberg (now Lviv) for the Kingdom of Galicia and Lodomeria and the Grand Duchy of Kraków
- Landesbank des Königreiches Böhmen, est. 1890 in Prague for the Kingdom of Bohemia
- Landesbank für Bosnien und Herzegowina, est. 1895 in Sarajevo for Bosnia and Herzegovina under Austro-Hungarian rule
- Bukowinaer Landesbank, est. 1905 in Czernowitz (now Chernivtsi) for the Duchy of Bukovina
- Kroatische Landesbank, est. 1909 in Esseg (now Osijek) for the Kingdom of Croatia-Slavonia
- Krainische Landesbank, est. 1912 in Laibach (now Ljubljana) for the Duchy of Carniola

By contrast, Vienna's Länderbank (est. 1880) and its short-lived affiliate the Ungarische Landesbank (1881-1887) were private-sector initiatives. The name Landesbank also survives in regional entities of the cooperative Raiffeisen Group in Austria and, similarly, the Raiffeisen Landesbank Südtirol – Cassa Centrale Raiffeisen dell'Alto Adige in the Italian region of South Tyrol.

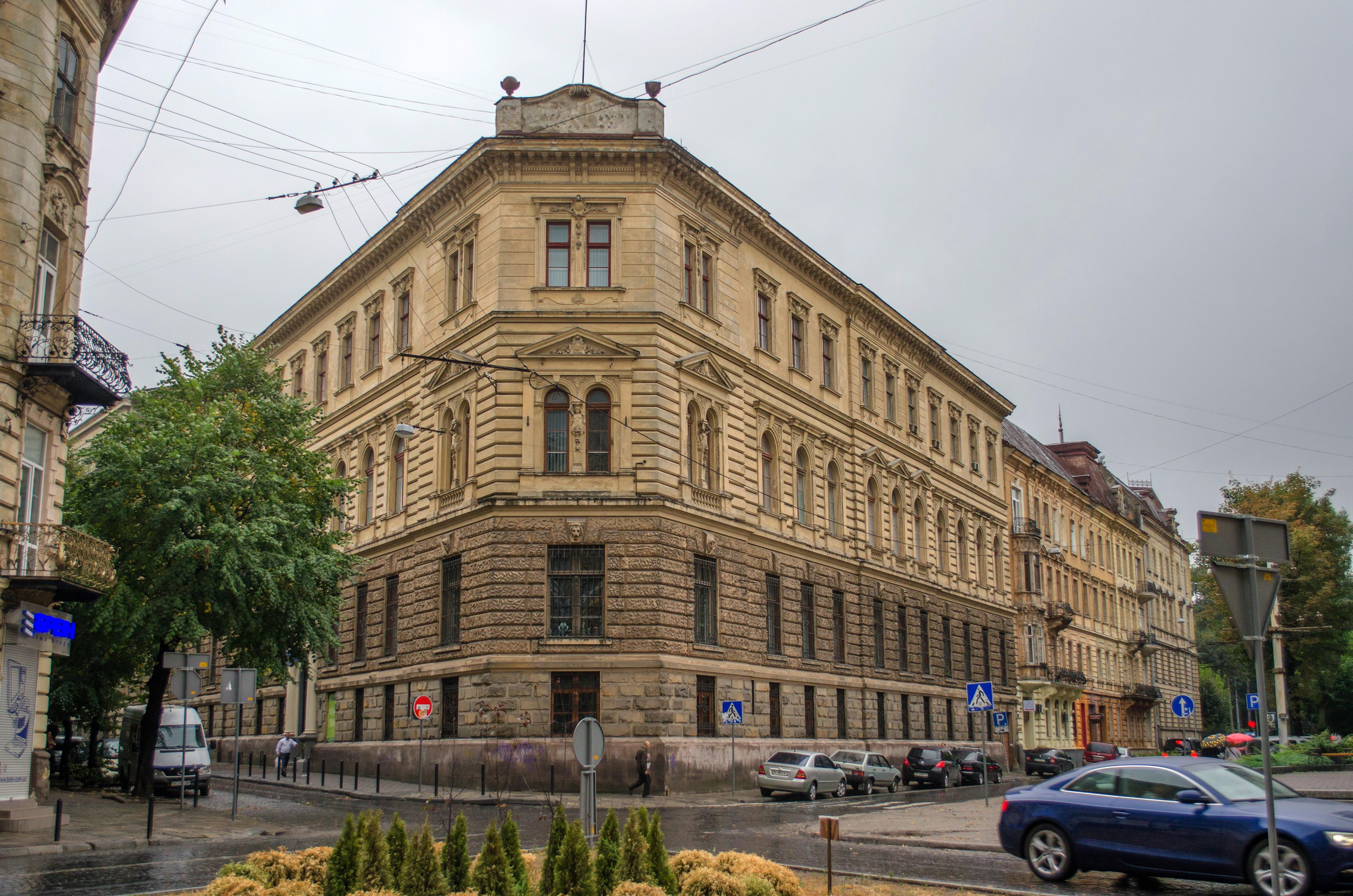
Former Galizische Landesbank in Lviv, 2015

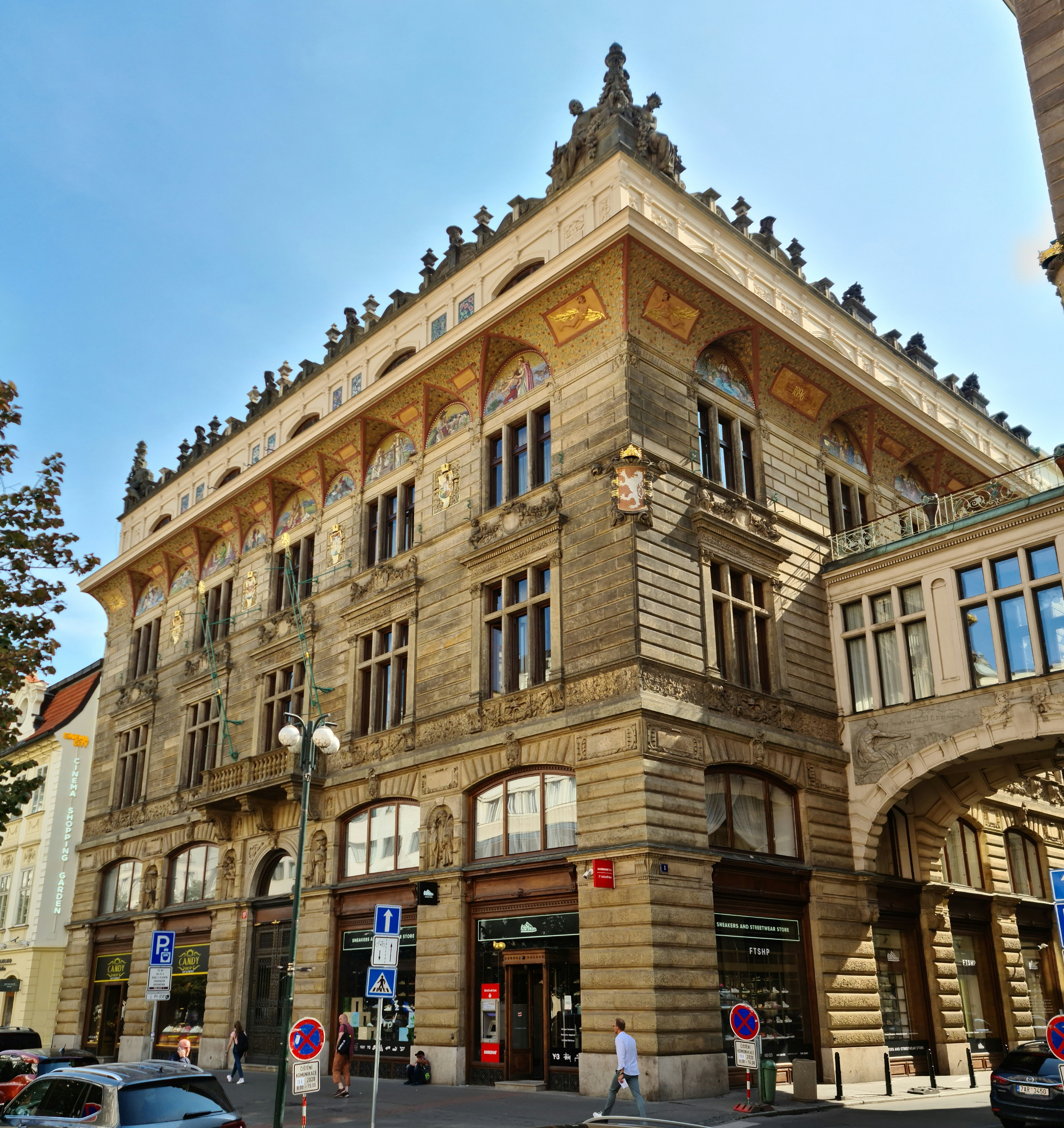
Former Böhmische Landesbank in Prague, 2020

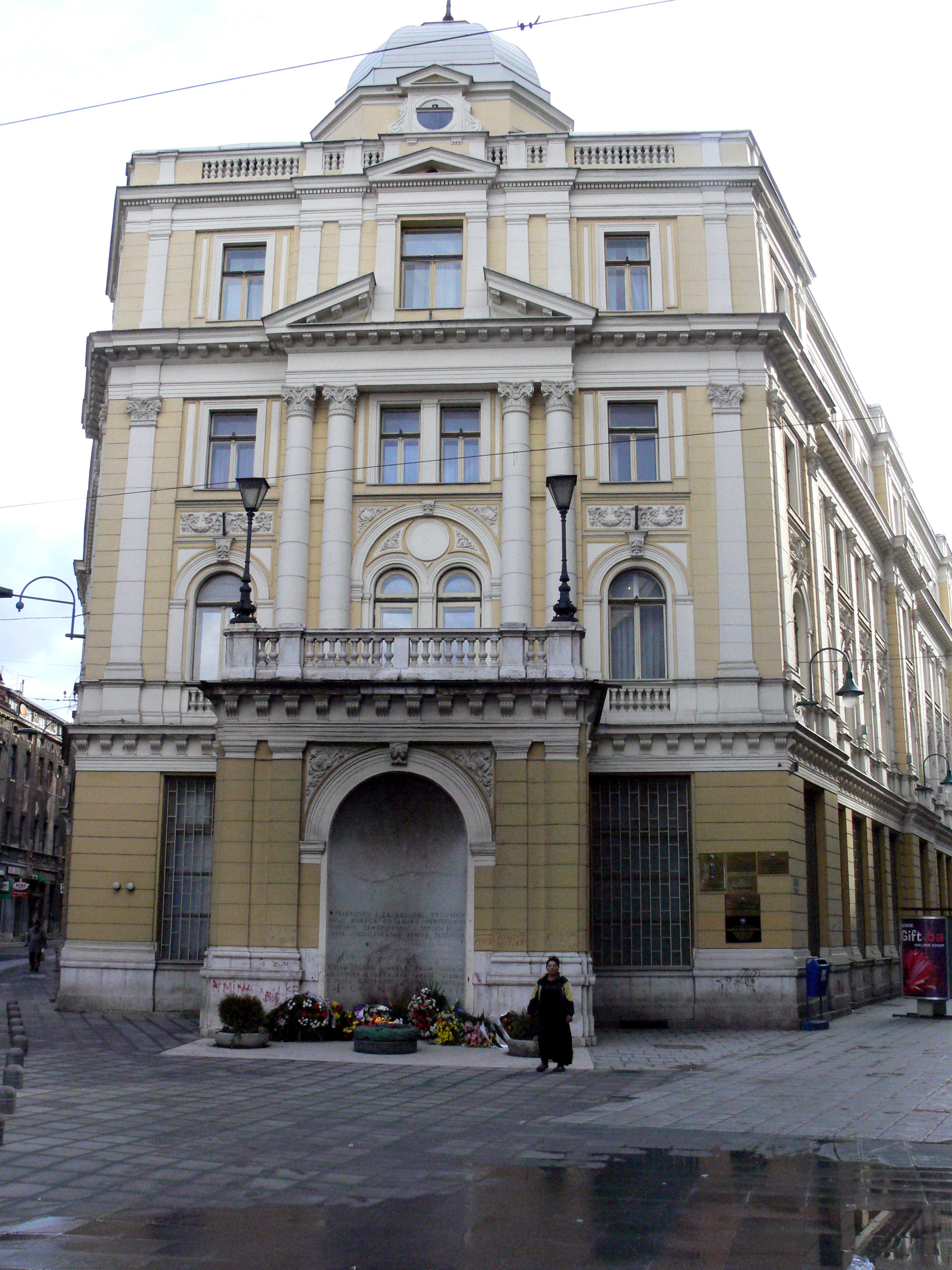
Former Bosnische Landesbank in Sarajevo, 2006

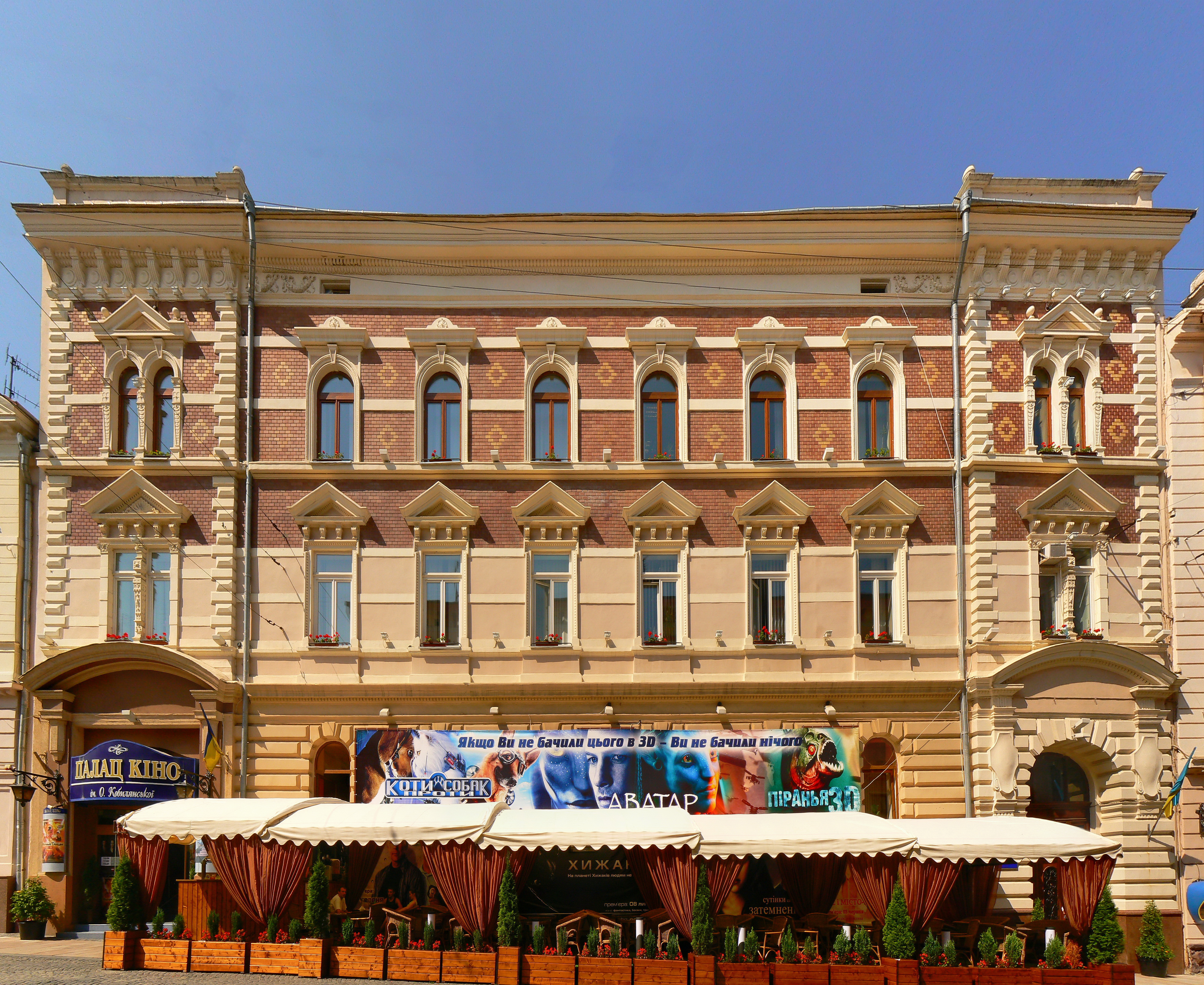
Former Bukowinaer Landesbank in Chernivtsi, 2010

== Germany ==
Map of coverage of Landesbanks as of 2022

The current Landesbanken are part of the Sparkassen-Finanzgruppe, one of the three pillars of Germany's banking system. Their business is predominantly wholesale banking, partly to serve local savings banks (German: Sparkassen). With a few exceptions, Landesbanken and Sparkassen are chartered by national and state banking laws to pursue a public purpose (German: öffentlicher Auftrag). As of late 2022, they are:

- Landesbank Baden-Württemberg (LBBW) in Stuttgart, covering Baden-Württemberg, Rhineland-Palatinate, and Saxony
- Bayerische Landesbank (BayernLB) in Munich, covering Bavaria
- Landesbank Hessen-Thüringen (Helaba) in Frankfurt and Erfurt, covering Brandenburg, Hesse, North Rhine-Westphalia, and Thuringia
- Norddeutsche Landesbank (NORD/LB) in Hanover, covering Bremen, Hamburg, Lower Saxony, Mecklenburg-Vorpommern, Saxony-Anhalt, and Schleswig-Holstein
- Landesbank Saar (SaarLB) in Saarbrücken, covering Saarland
Logo of LBBW

Logo of BayernLB

Logo of Helaba

Logo of NORD/LB

Logo of SaarLB

Four other German institutions are named Landesbank without playing the role of the above five within the public sector:

- Landesbank Berlin (LBB) was converted into a joint-stock company (German: Aktiengesellschaft) in 2007, when the DSGV rescued it and took full ownership of its share capital; it is part of the Sparkassen-Finanzgruppe
- Hohenzollerische Landesbank Kreissparkasse Sigmaringen is a local public savings bank, part of the Sparkassen-Finanzgruppe; its earliest predecessor was established in 1834 as Spar- und Leihkasse für das Fürstentum Hohenzollern-Sigmaringen, and was renamed Hohenzollerische Landesbank Spar- und Leihkasse in 1930
- Kreissparkasse Birkenfeld, another local public savings bank within the Sparkassen-Finanzgruppe, is also occasionally referred to as Birkenfelder Landesbank because one of its predecessor entities was a local branch of Oldenburgische Landesbank, opened in Birkenfeld in 1914
- Oldenburgische Landesbank (OLB, est. 1869) has always been a private-sector bank, controlled since 2017 by Apollo Global Management.
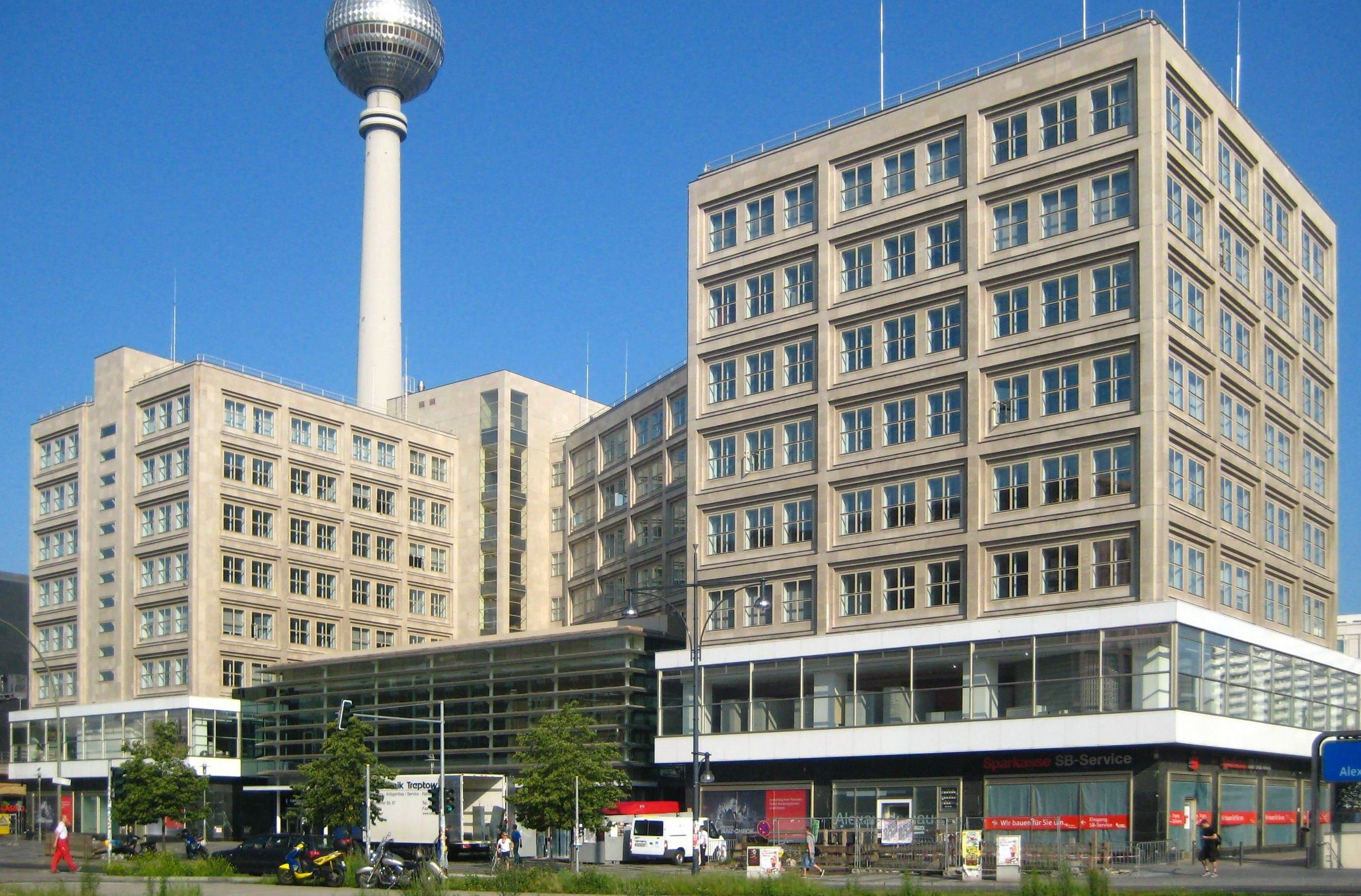
Landesbank Berlin head office in Berlin, 2009

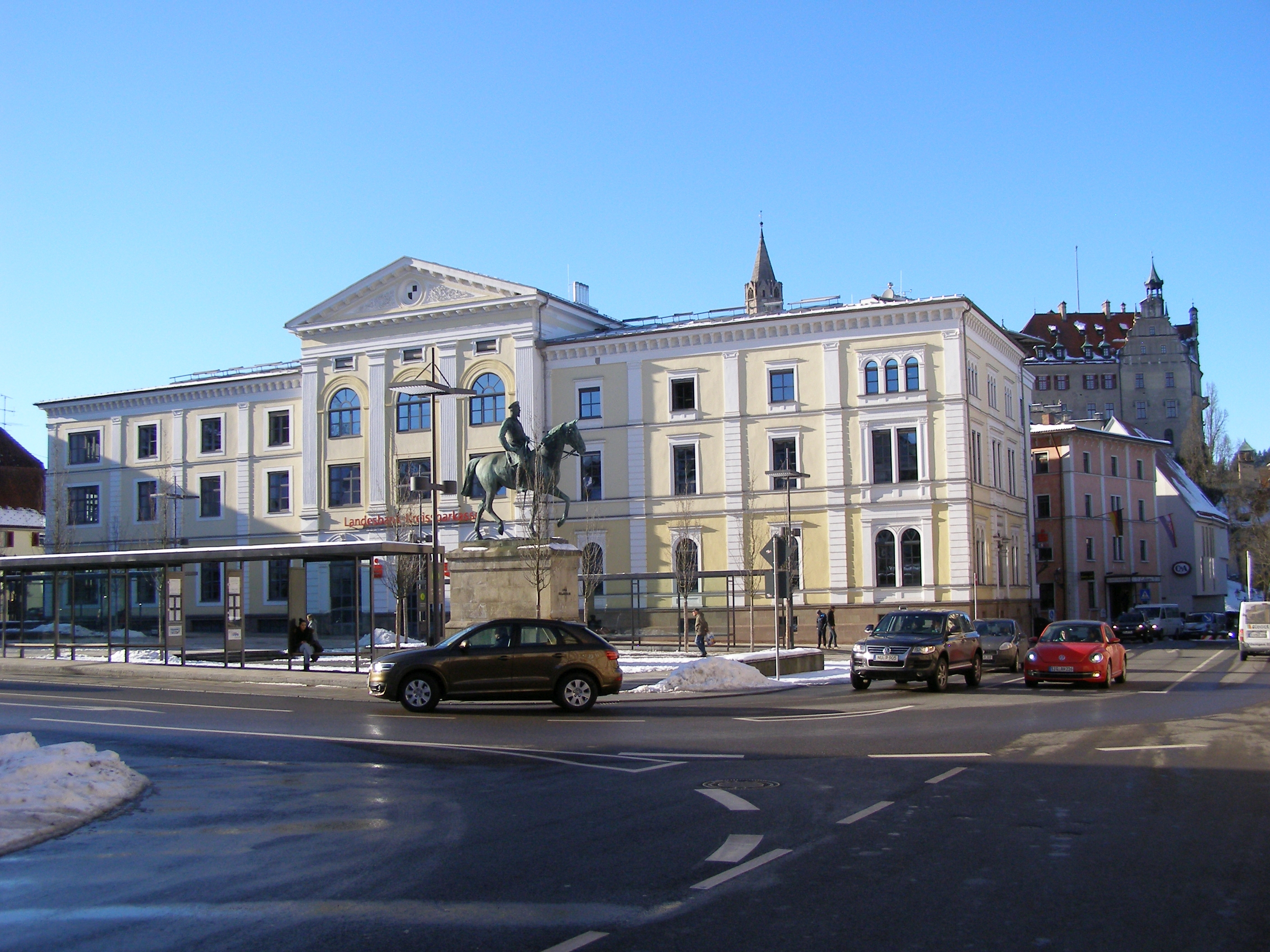
Hohenzollerische Landesbank Kreissparkasse in Sigmaringen, 2015

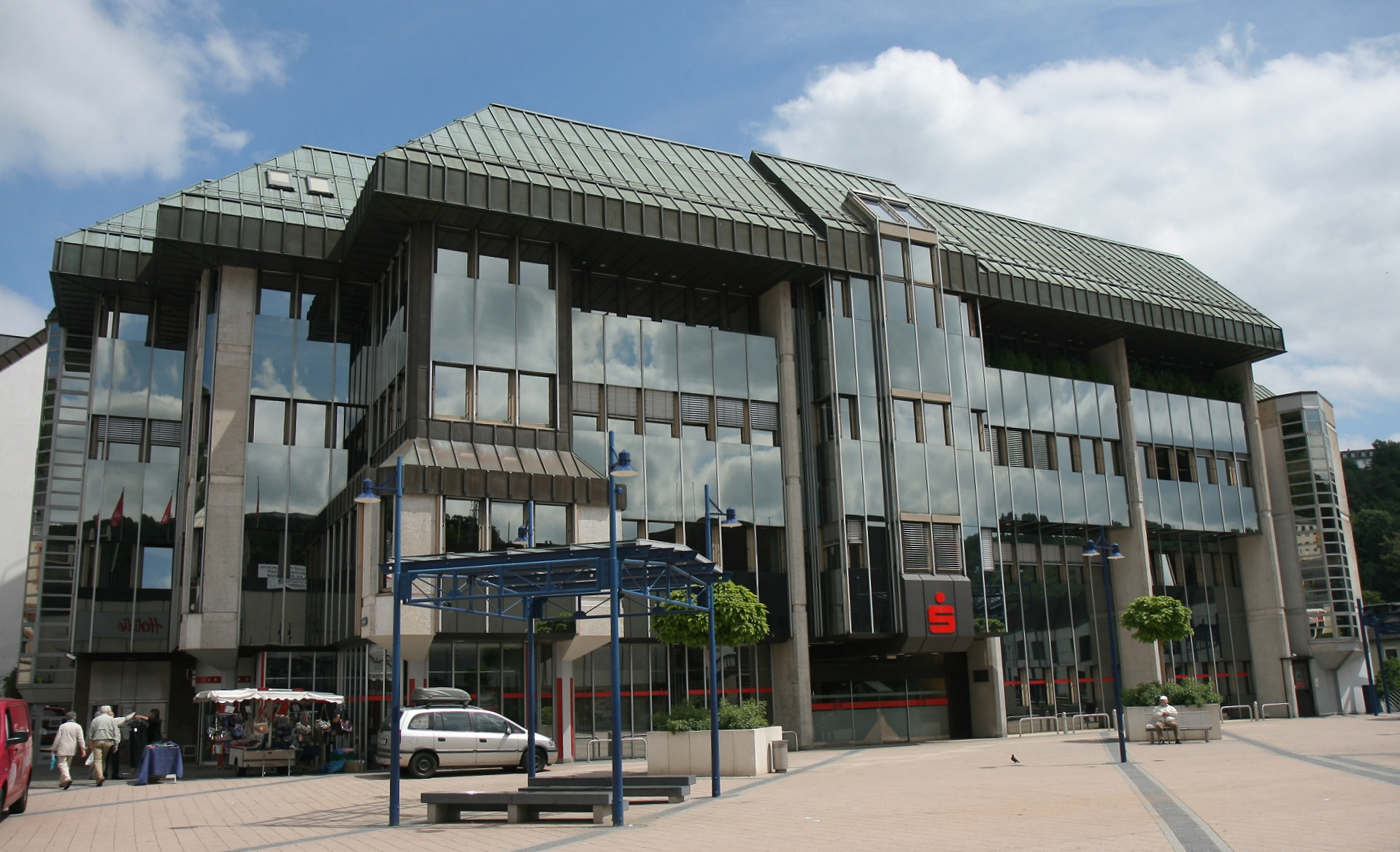
Kreissparkasse Birkenfeld in Idar-Oberstein, 2009

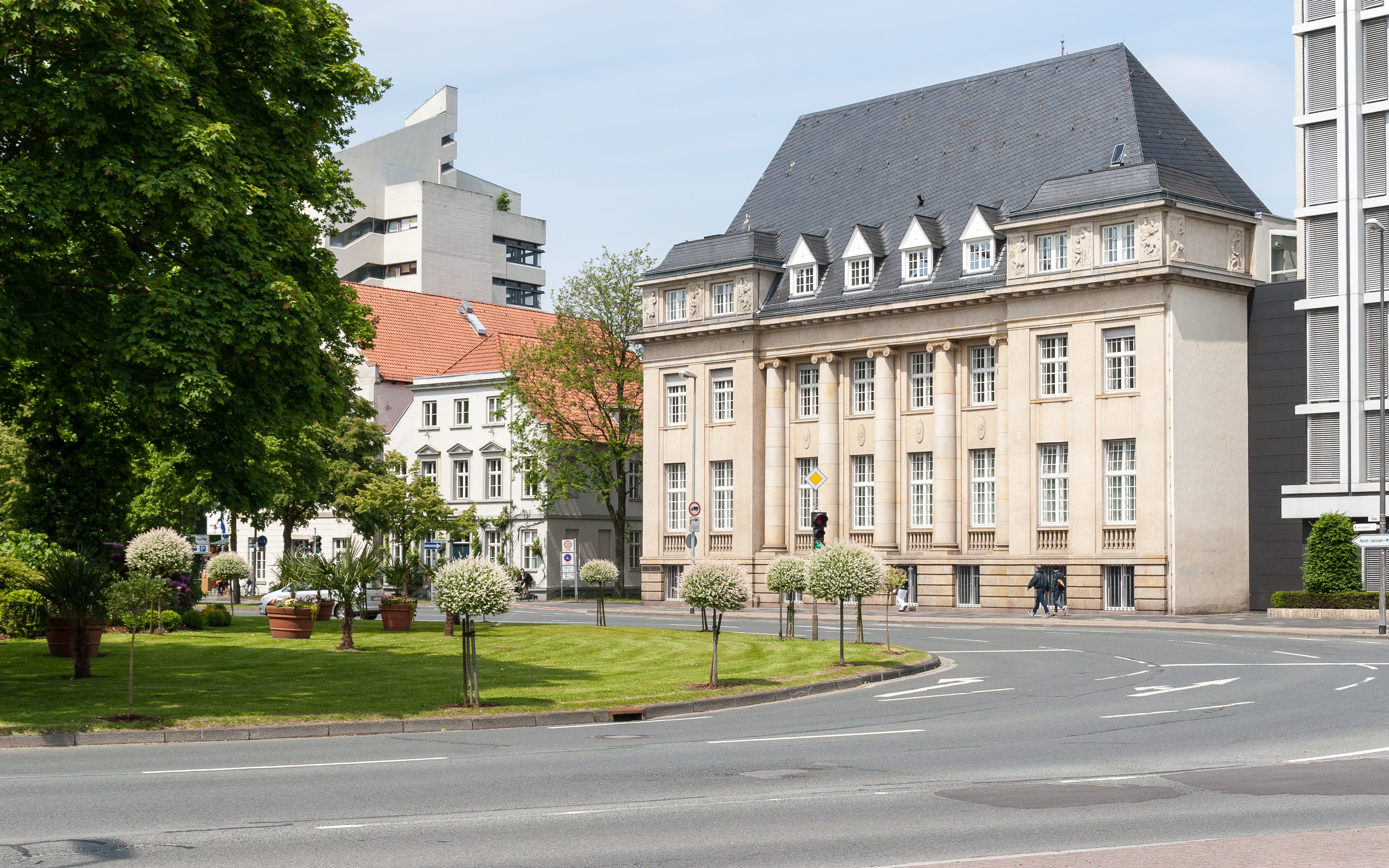
Oldenburgische Landesbank in Oldenburg, 2010

== Liechtenstein ==
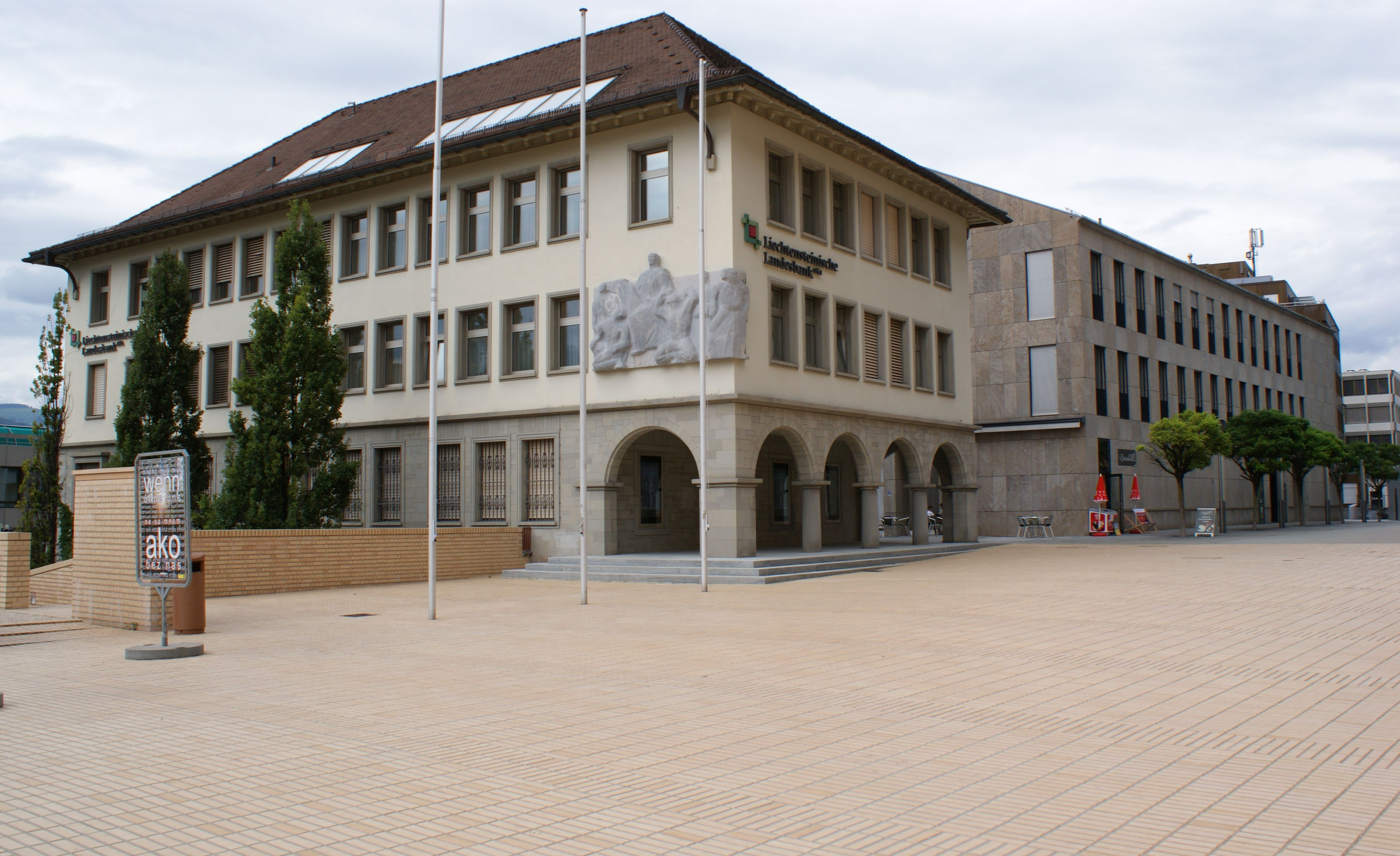
Liechtensteinische Landesbank in Vaduz

The German name of the National Bank of Liechtenstein is Liechtensteinische Landesbank AG.

== See also ==
- Cantonal banks, the Swiss equivalent of Landesbanken
- Bank of North Dakota
- Puerto Rico Government Development Bank
