= DVB (disambiguation) =

DVB is the acronym for Digital Video Broadcasting, a set of standards relating to digital television.

DVB may refer to:

- Delhi Vidyut Board
- Democratic Voice of Burma, expatriate broadcaster, broadcasting into Burma
- Divinylbenzene, a benzene derivative used to make polymers
- Dresdner Verkehrsbetriebe, the municipal transport company for Dresden in Germany
- DVB Bank, a commercial transport finance company based in Frankfurt, Germany

== See also ==
- Donny van de Beek, Dutch footballer
