= German public banking sector =

Component of Germany's banking sector

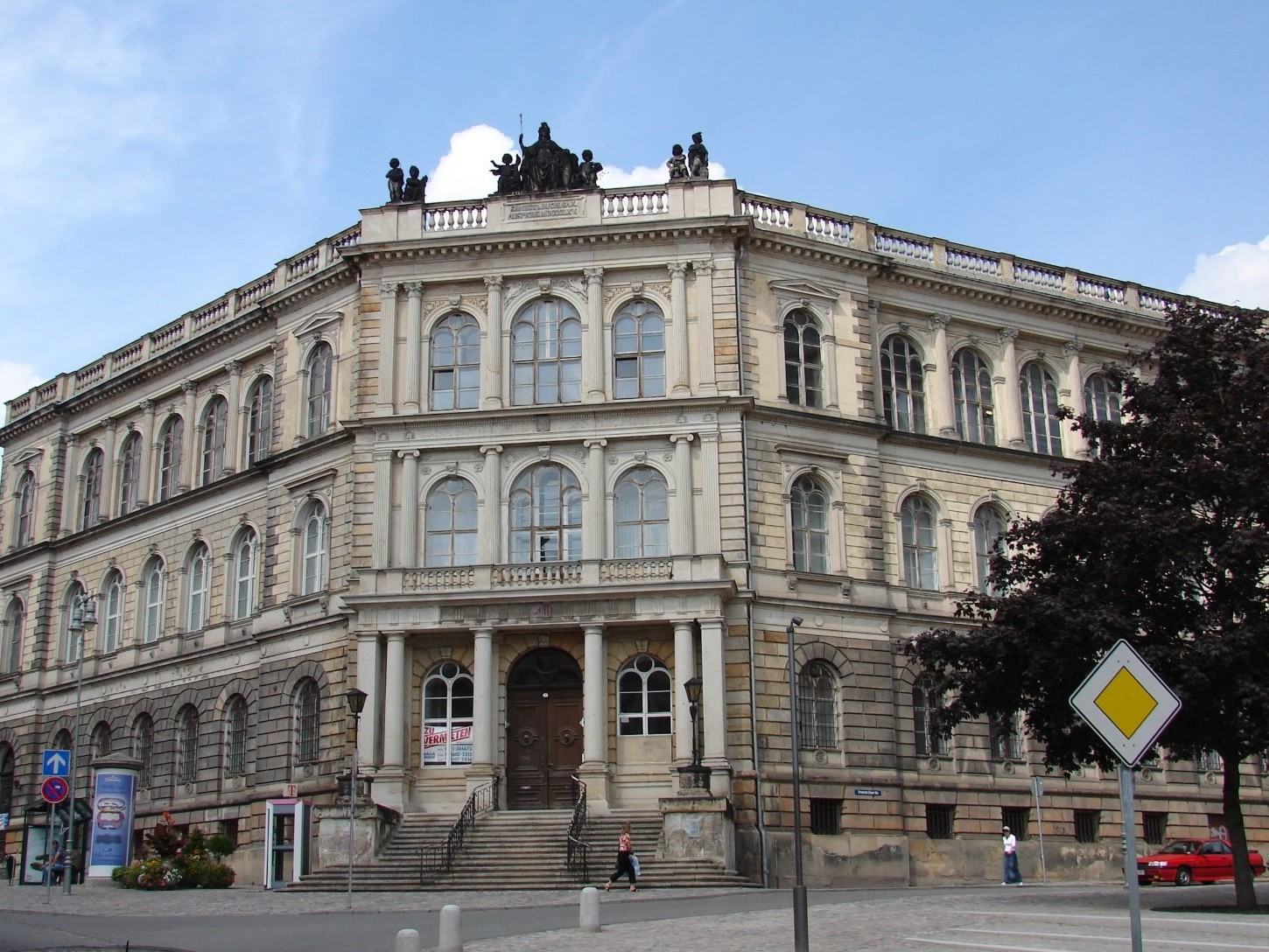
Building of the Herzogliche Landesbank in Altenburg, erected 1862-1865

The German public banking sector (German: Öffentliches Kreditwesen) represents a significant share of the broader banking sector in Germany. Unlike in most other Western and Central European countries, German public-sector banks have been present since the early phases of formalization of banking entities in the early modern period and have never lost their collective significance. They are typically referred to as one of the three “pillars” of the German banking system, the other two pillars being the cooperative banks and commercial banks.

Following many steps of development, consolidation, and restructuring, the German public banking sector (leaving aside the Deutsche Bundesbank) consists mainly of two clusters: the Sparkassen-Finanzgruppe, which competes with commercial and cooperative banks and includes local savings banks (German: Sparkassen) and regional entities (German: Landesbanken); and promotional and development banks (German: Förderbanken) owned by the Federal Republic of Germany (in the case of KfW) or the individual states of Germany.

== History ==
Government-owned banks are among the oldest financial institutions in Germany, with several appearing in the late 18th century simultaneously as the first municipally owned savings banks. Throughout the 19th century, governments of individual states or provinces of Prussia established (respectively) Landesbanken and Provinzialbanken to lend to various kinds of borrowers, including Sparkassen but not limited to them. Unlike in most European countries where banking was an exclusive activity of the private sector, government-owned banks thus remained a structural feature of the German financial system, even as joint-stock Grossbanken gained relative importance in the second half of the century.

The beginning of the 20th century saw the emergence of a number of Girozentralen acting as centralizing entities for their region's Sparkassen, a trend that was greatly accelerated by government policy choices during World War I even though it had started slightly earlier; numerous episodes of consolidation followed, leading to the current Landesbank landscape. By 1929, government-owned banks accounted for at least 40 percent of all banking assets in Germany. That feature set Germany apart from other European countries in which, aside from the Soviet Union of course, the bulk of the banking sector was in private-sector hands.

As a consequence of the European banking crisis of 1931, further German banks were nationalized, but they were soon reprivatized in 1935–1937 by Nazi Germany. Still, by 1938, government-owned banks represented 42 percent (in terms of aggregated assets) of the 25 largest banks in Germany, not counting those in annexed Austria. These included the Prussian and Bavarian Staatsbanken, Berliner Sparkasse, Reichs-Kredit-Gesellschaft, Deutschlandkasse, Deutsche Girozentrale, and eight regional Girozentralen, namely those in Düsseldorf (serving the Rhineland), Dresden (Saxony), Munich (Bavaria), Magdeburg (central Germany), Berlin (city), Hanover (Lower Saxony), Berlin (Brandenburg), and Breslau (Silesia). (The other 11 banks in the top 25 were Deutsche Bank, Dresdner Bank, Bank der Deutschen Arbeit, Commerzbank, the indirectly government-owned Deutsche Verkehrs-Kredit-Bank, cooperative Deutsche Rentenbank-Kreditanstalt, Bayerische Hypotheken- und Wechsel-Bank, Deutsche Centralbodenkredit AG, part-government-owned Deutsche Industriebank and Deutsche Bau- und Bodenbank, and Bayerische Vereinsbank.) By 1943, the share had risen to 54 percent.

With the delineation of West Germany's Länder between 1948 and 1957, the Landesbanks started acting as "house banks" of their respective Land, thus expanding into some of largest German issuers of cross-border debt. By the early 21st century, other European countries that had nationalized swathes of their banking sectors in the 1930s and 1940s had mostly brought them back into the private sector, and Germany again stood out for the large share of its banking sector under government control, a situation that has not much changed in the subsequent two decades.

The Förderbanken emerged more recently as a distinct category. KfW was established in 1948 and a few regional promotional banks in the early 1950s, but in most German states they were created (in Eastern Germany) or spun off from the local Landesbank (in the West) in the 1990s and 2000s.

The German public banking sector has witnessed numerous episodes of distress, in part because of its inherently politicized governance. In mid-1931, the default of the Landesbank der Rheinprovinz, following aggressive and uncontrolled expansion of its credit to German municipalities, was a major trigger of Germany's economic depression, even though other Landesbanken such as the Mitteldeutsche Landesbank survived the episode largely unscathed. Other cases of major difficulties have included the troubles of Westdeutsche Landesbank (WestLB) in the 1970s; Bankgesellschaft Berlin in the early 2000s; Landesbank Sachsen and (again) WestLB in 2007–2008; and HSH Nordbank and NORD/LB in the 2010s.

The following lists detail the path of formation of the current landscape, which has tended to be understudied because of its complexity and heterogeneity. For relative readability, developments are classified in broad geographical categories, and individual Sparkassen are omitted. The list also omits various state financial entities set up at the time of Nazi Germany and discontinued in 1945.

=== National entities ===
- 1895: Preussische Central-Genossenschaftskasse, also known as the Preussenkasse, established in Berlin to facilitate the funding of local agricultural cooperative banking throughout Prussia, with capital provided by the Prussian state
- 1918: Deutsche Girozentrale (DGZ) established in Berlin
- 1922: Reichs-Kredit-Gesellschaft (RKG) established in Berlin
- 1923: Deutsche Rentenbank established in Berlin to address hyperinflation
  - Deutsche Bau- und Bodenbank established to finance low-income housing
  - Deutsche Verkehrs-Kredit-Bank established as a subsidiary of the state-owned Deutsche Reichsbahn
- 1924: Deutsche Industriebank (initially Bank für deutsche Industrieobligationen) founded to act as a trustee for the revenues collected from German industry under the Dawes Plan
- 1925: Deutsche Rentenbank-Kreditanstalt established in Berlin to take over the Deutsche Rentenbank's agricultural credit portfolio
- 1932: Preussenkasse renamed as Deutsche Zentralgenossenschaftskasse, or Deutschlandkasse
- 1931: The German government becomes owner of equity stakes in distressed commercial banks including Dresdner Bank (97 percent), Commerz- und Privatbank (71 percent), Allgemeine Deutsche Credit-Anstalt (70 percent), Norddeutsche Kreditbank (67 percent), and Deutsche Bank (38.5 percent)
- 1935-1937: the commercial banks nationalized in 1931 are reprivatized
- 1945: All banks in the Soviet occupation zone, including DGZ, RKG and Deutschlandkasse, ordered to stop their operations by the Soviet Military Administration in Germany
- 1948: Kreditanstalt für Wiederaufbau (KfW) established in Frankfurt
- 1949: DGZ recreated in Düsseldorf, and Landwirtschaftliche Rentenbank established as a public bank in Frankfurt. Deutsche Genossenschaftskasse (DGK) is also recreated but without government ownership
- 1950: Vertriebenen-Bank AG established in Bonn, later renamed Bank für Vertriebene und Geschädigte (1952), Lastenausgleichsbank (1954) and eventually Deutsche Ausgleichsbank (1986)
- 1956: Deutsche Kapitalanlagegesellschaft (Deka) established in Frankfurt
- 1965: DGZ relocated in Frankfurt
- 1995: Cooperative DZ Bank acquires majority ownership of the former Deutsche Verkehrs-Kredit-Bank
- 1999: DekaBank formed by merger of DGZ and Deka
- 2003: KfW takes over Deutsche Ausgleichsbank
- 2011: DSGV acquires sole ownership of Dekabank

=== Berlin and Eastern Germany ===
- 1765: Prussian Royal Bank (German: Königliche Hauptbank) established in Berlin
- 1772: Seehandlungsgesellschaft established in Berlin; renamed as Prussian State bank (German: Preussische Staatsbank) in 1918
- 1792: Landesbank established in Altenburg
- 1847: Prussian Royal Bank replaced by the Bank of Prussia, a nominally private-sector institution
  - Sächsische Provinzialbank established in Merseburg
  - Anhalt-Dessauische Landesbank established in Dessau
- 1849: Landeskreditanstalt Meiningen established in Meiningen
- 1909: Giroverband Sächsischer Gemeinden established in Dresden (later Girozentrale Sachsen
- 1915: Girozentrale - Kommunalbank für die Provinz Sachsen, Thüringen und Anhalt established in Magdeburg
- 1916: Schlesische Landesbank und Girozentrale established in Breslau
- 1919: Sächsische Staatsbank established in Leipzig; relocated in 1920 to Dresden
- 1922: Thüringische Staatsbank established in Weimar
- 1923: Thüringische Staatsbank takes over the Landesbank in Altenburg, Landesbank in Rudolstadt, Landeskreditanstalt Meiningen, and the Landessparkassen in the former Gera-Greiz area
- 1924: Wohnungsfürsorgegesellschaft Berlin established in Berlin
- 1925: Berliner Stadtbank – Girozentrale der Stadt Berlin established in Berlin
- 1927: Brandenburgische Provinzialbank und Girozentrale established in Berlin
- 1928: Mitteldeutsche Landesbank - Girozentrale für die Provinz Sachsen, Thüringen und Anhalt formed by merger of Girozentrale - Kommunalbank für die Provinz Sachsen, Thüringen und Anhalt and Sächsische Provinzialbank in Merseburg, with head office in Magdeburg
- 1932: Anhalt-Dessauische Landesbank acquired by Allgemeine Deutsche Credit-Anstalt
- 1937: Wohnungsfürsorgegesellschaft Berlin restructured as Wohnungsbau-Kreditanstalt der Reichshauptstadt Berlin; the construction and property management operations are spun off as Gemeinnützige Siedlungs- und Wohnungsbaugesellschaft Berlin (GSW)
- 1945: All banks in the Soviet occupation zone ordered to end their operations by the Soviet Military Administration in Germany
- 1949 Wohnungsbau-Kreditanstalt (WBK) recreated in West Berlin
- 1950: Berliner Bank established in Berlin
- 1973: Berliner Pfandbrief-Bank, later known as Berlin Hyp, formed by combination of the West Berlin operations of Prussian State Bank, Brandenburgische Provinzialbank und Girozentrale, and other entities
- 1990: Landesbank Berlin established in Berlin
  - Sächsische Aufbaubank established in Leipzig by Landeskreditbank Baden-Württemberg
- 1992: Landesbank Sachsen established in Leipzig, Saxony
  - Investitionsbank des Landes Brandenburg (ILB) established in Potsdam
  - Thüringer Aufbaubank established in Erfurt
- 1993: Wohnungsbau-Kreditanstalt Berlin renamed as Investitionsbank Berlin
  - Landesförderinstitut Sachsen-Anhalt established in Magdeburg
- 1994: Bankkesellschaft Berlin formed as a holding company bringing together Landesbank Berlin, Berliner Bank and Berlin Hyp
  - Landesförderinstitut Mecklenburg-Vorpommern established in Schwerin
- 1998: Sächsische Aufbaubank ownership transferred from L-Bank to the state of Saxony
- 2004: Landesförderinstitut Sachsen-Anhalt transformed into Investitionsbank Sachsen-Anhalt (IB)
- 2007: Troubled Bankkesellschaft Berlin acquired by the DSGV and renamed Landesbank Berlin Holding
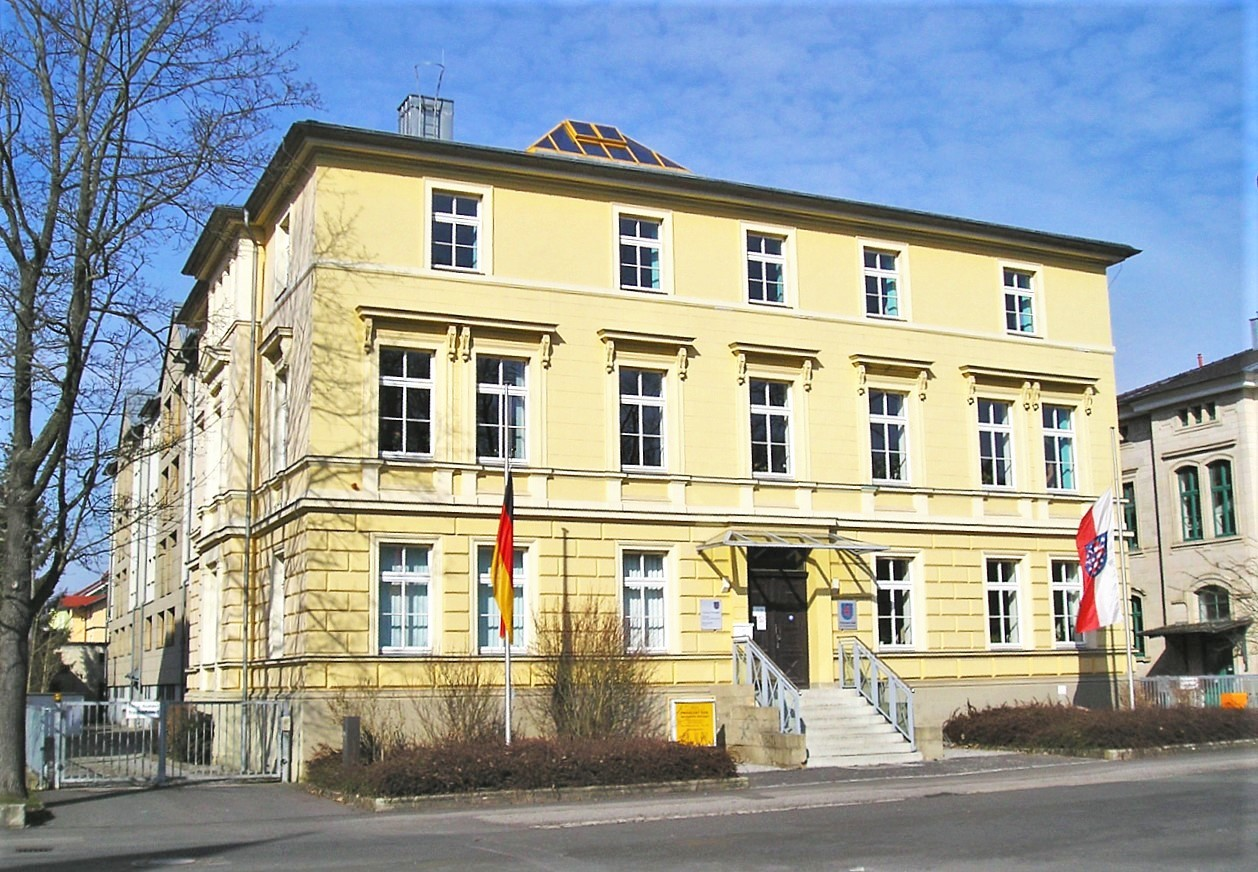
Former head office of Landeskreditanstalt Meiningen, 2009

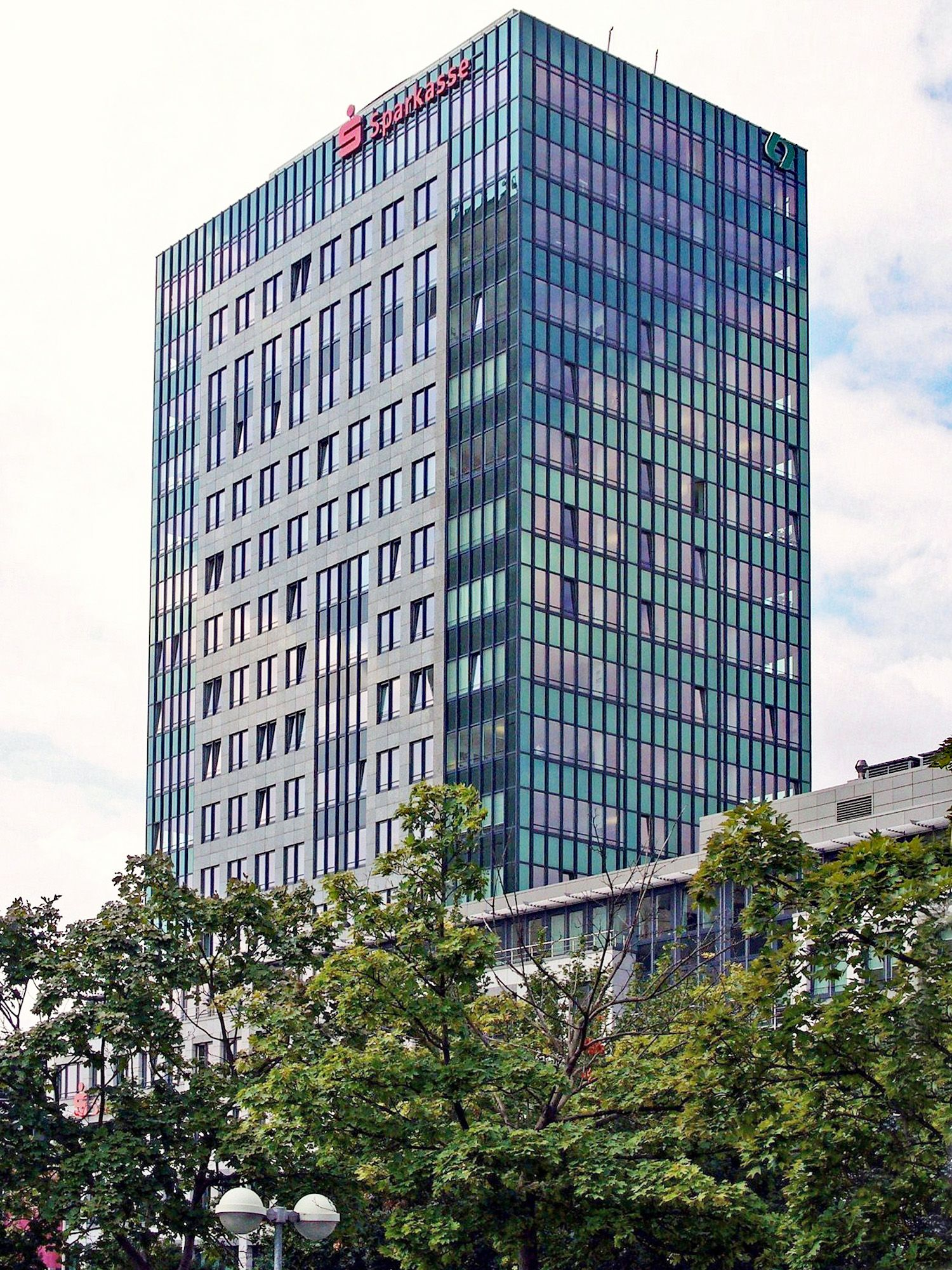
Former SachsenLB head office in Leipzig, 2007

=== Northwestern Germany ===
- 1619: Hamburger Bank established in Hamburg
- 1765: Herzogliche Leyhaus established in Braunschweig
- 1825: Calenberger Kreditverein established in Hanover
- 1840: Hannoversche Landeskreditanstalt established in Hanover
- 1875: Hamburger Bank taken over by the Bank of Prussia
- 1883: Bodencredit-Anstalt des Herzogtums Oldenburg established in Oldenburg, renamed Staatliche Kreditanstalt des Herzogtums Oldenburg in 1906 and Staatliche Kreditanstalt Oldenburg in 1922
- 1917: Landesbank Schleswig-Holstein Girozentrale established in Kiel
  - Landesbank der Provinz Hannover established in Hanover
- 1918: Niedersächsische Wohnungskreditanstalt Stadtschaft established in Hanover
- 1919: Herzogliche Leyhaus in Braunschweig renamed Braunschweigische Staatsbank
- 1928: Hansa-Bank established in Bremen
- 1933: Landesbank der Provinz Hannover renamed Niedersächsische Landesbank Girozentrale
- 1938: Staatliche Kreditanstalt Oldenburg-Bremen formed by merger of Hansa-Bank and Staatliche Kreditanstalt Oldenburg
  - Bremer Landesbank – Girozentrale established in Bremen
  - Hamburgische Landesbank – Girozentrale (HLB) established in Hamburg
- 1951: Bremer Aufbau-Bank (BAB) established in Bremen
- 1952: Hamburgische Wohnungsbaukasse established in Hamburg, renamed Hamburgische Wohnungsbaukreditanstalt (WK) in 1973
- 1970: Norddeutsche Landesbank Girozentrale (later branded as NORD/LB) formed by merger of Braunschweigische Staatsbank, Hannoversche Landeskreditanstalt, Niedersächsische Landesbank Girozentrale, Niedersächsische Wohnungskreditanstalt Stadtschaft, and Braunschweigische Landessparkasse)
- 1983: Bremer Landesbank Kreditanstalt Oldenburg – Girozentrale (also known as Bremer Landesbank, or BLB) formed by merger of Bremer Landesbank – Girozentrale and Staatlichen Kreditanstalt Oldenburg-Bremen
- 2001: Investitionsbank Schleswig-Holstein (IB.SH) established in Kiel
- 2003: HSH Nordbank AG formed by merger of Hamburgische Landesbank – Girozentrale and Landesbank Schleswig-Holstein Girozentrale, with joint head offices in Hamburg and Kiel
- 2004: Investitions- und Förderbank Niedersachsen (NBank) established in Hanover
- 2005: Hamburgische Investitions- und Förderbank (IFB Hamburg) established in Hamburg
- 2013: IFB Hamburg takes over Hamburgische Wohnungsbaukreditanstalt
- 2017: BLB merged into NORD/LB
- 2019: HSH Nordbank privatized and renamed Hamburg Commercial Bank; Landesbank role in Hamburg and Schleswig-Holstein taken up by NORD/LB
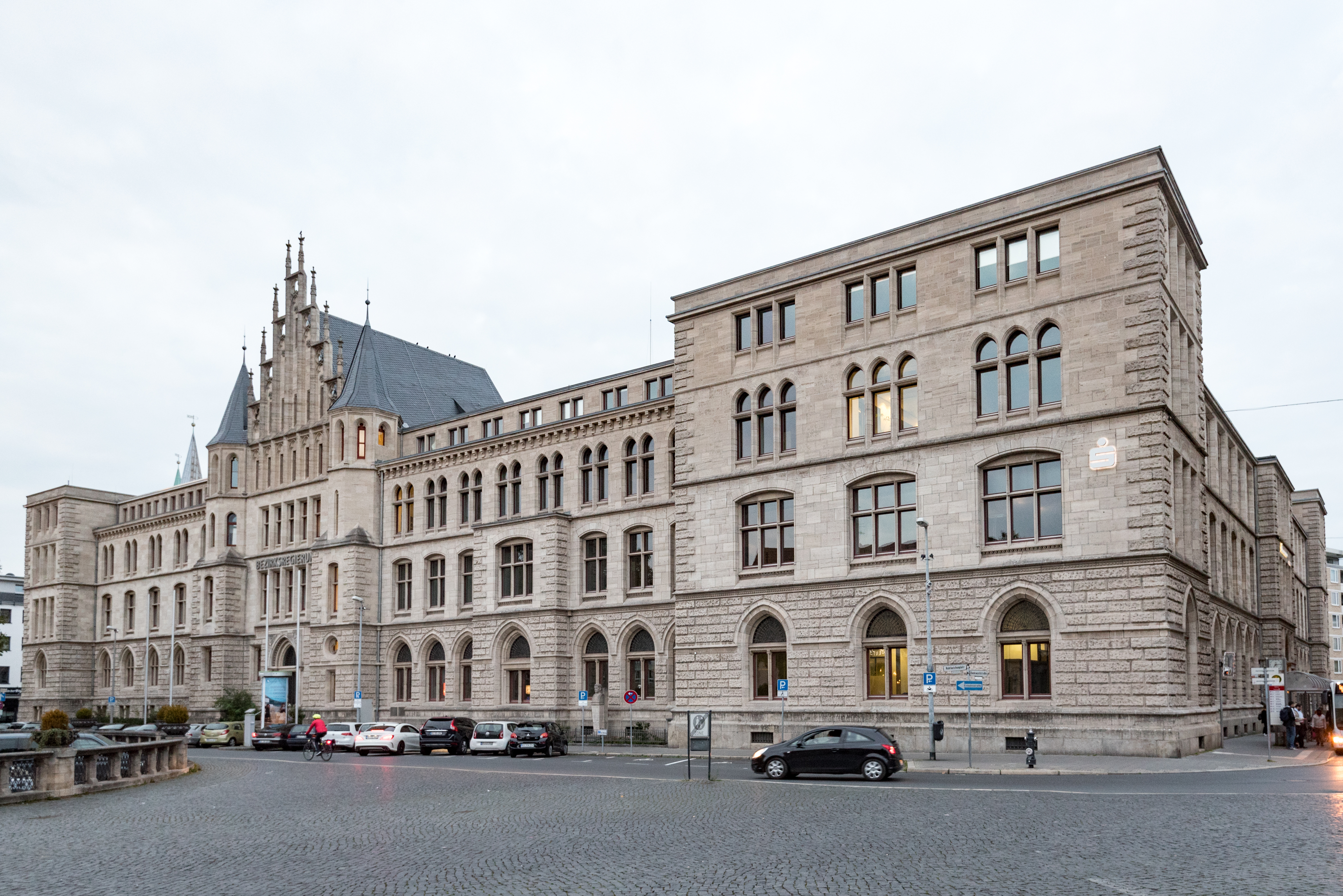
Verwaltungsbezirk building on Ruhfäutchenplatz in Braunschweig, head office of Braunschweigische Staatsbank until 1966

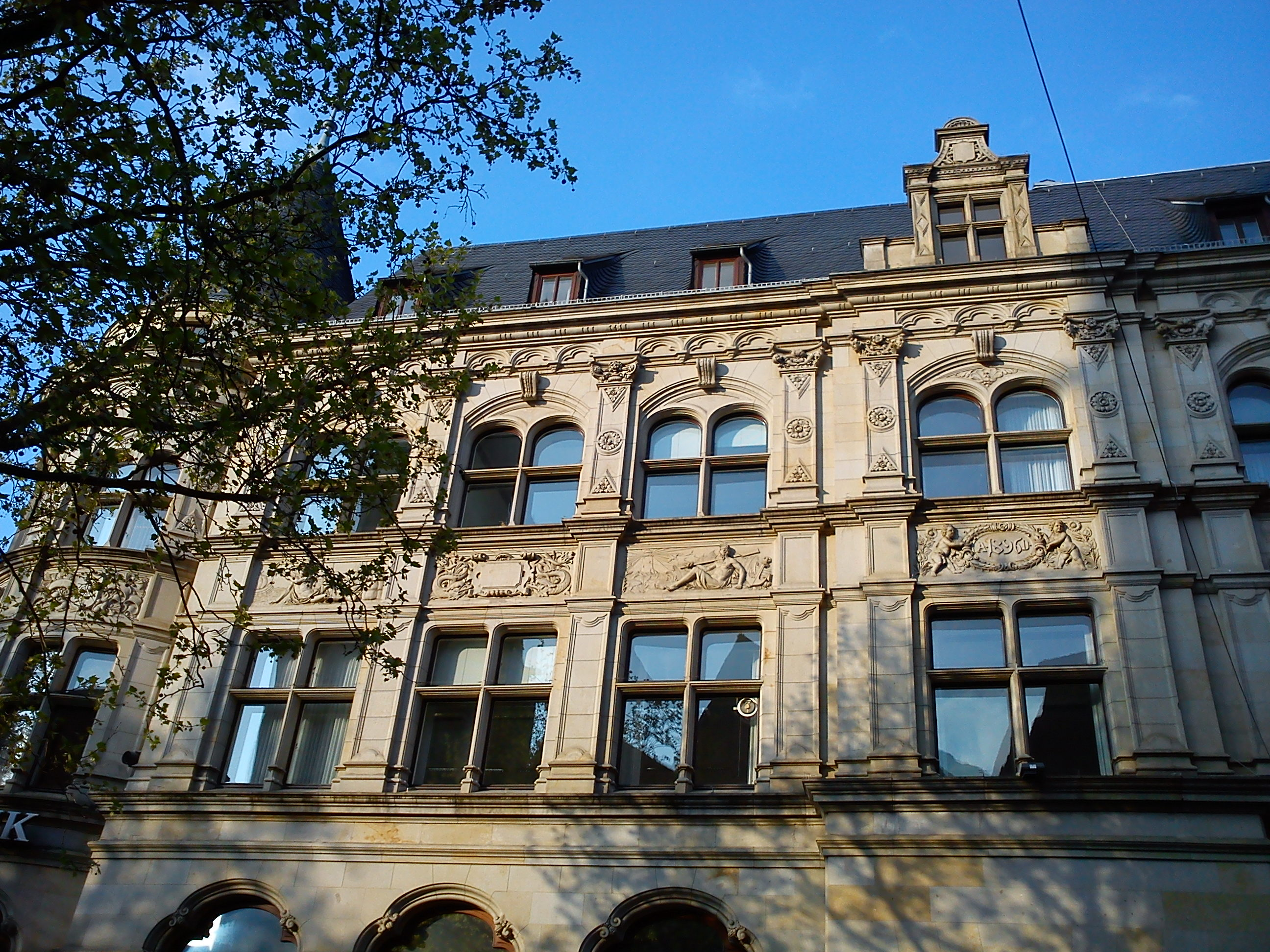
1896 building of the Deutsche Nationalbank, head office of Bremer Landesbank in Bremen from 1938 to the 2010s

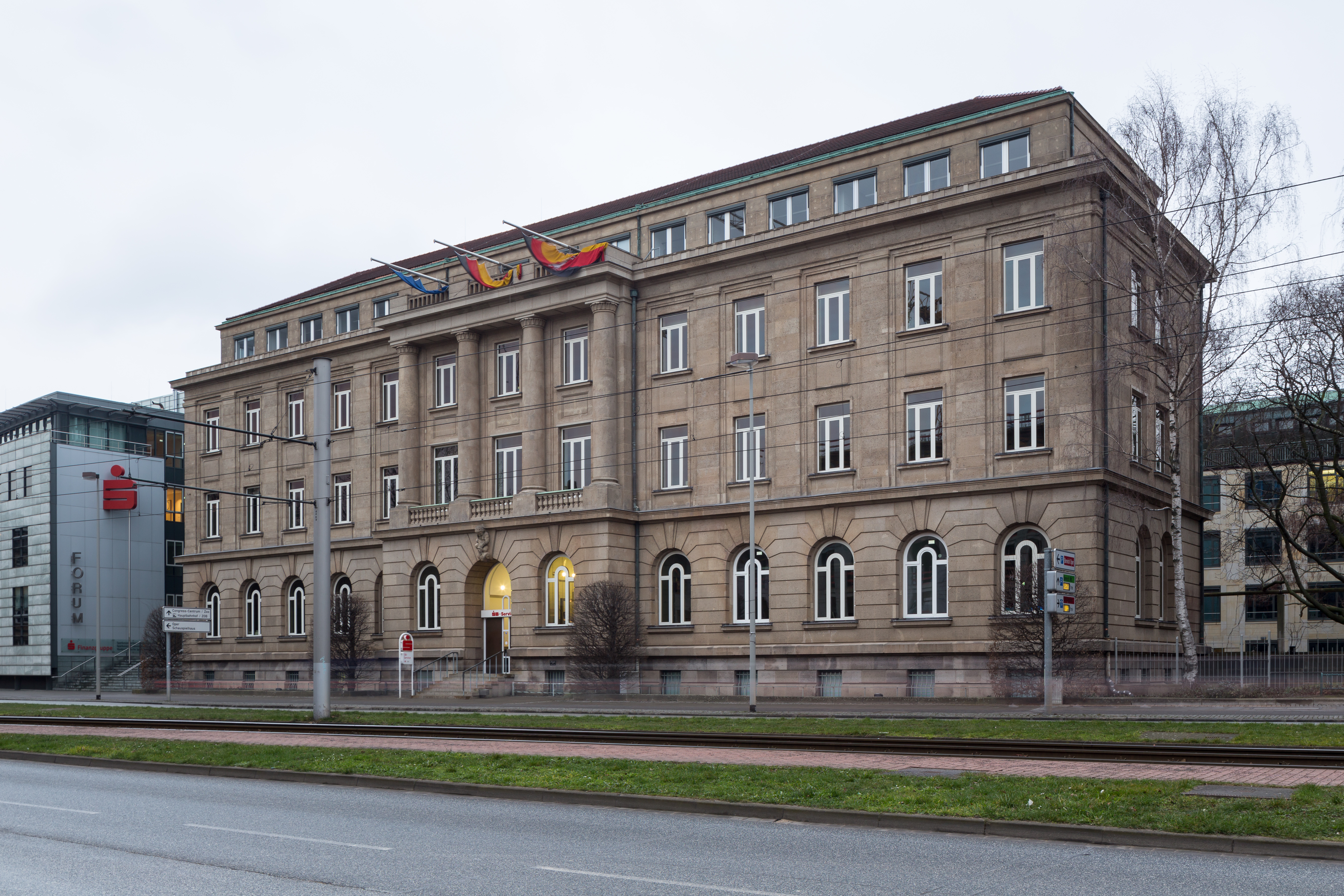
Building at Schiffgraben 6 in Hanover, head office of Landeskreditanstalt from 1914 to 1970; later seat of the regional Sparkassenverband

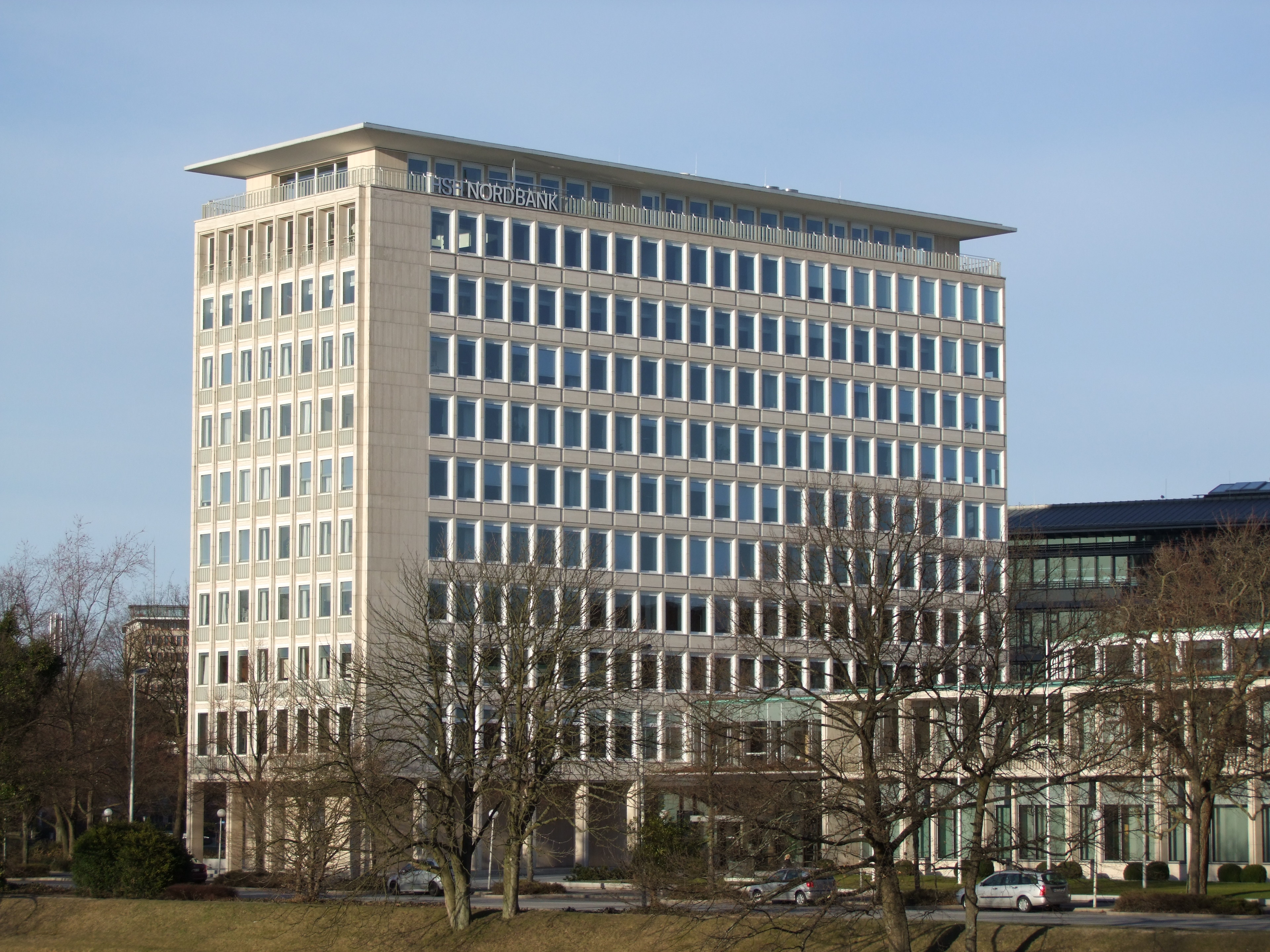
Building at Martendamm 4 in Kiel, head office of Landesbank Schleswig-Holstein Girozentrale (1954–2003), HSH Nordbank (2003–2019), and Hamburg Commercial Bank (since 2019)

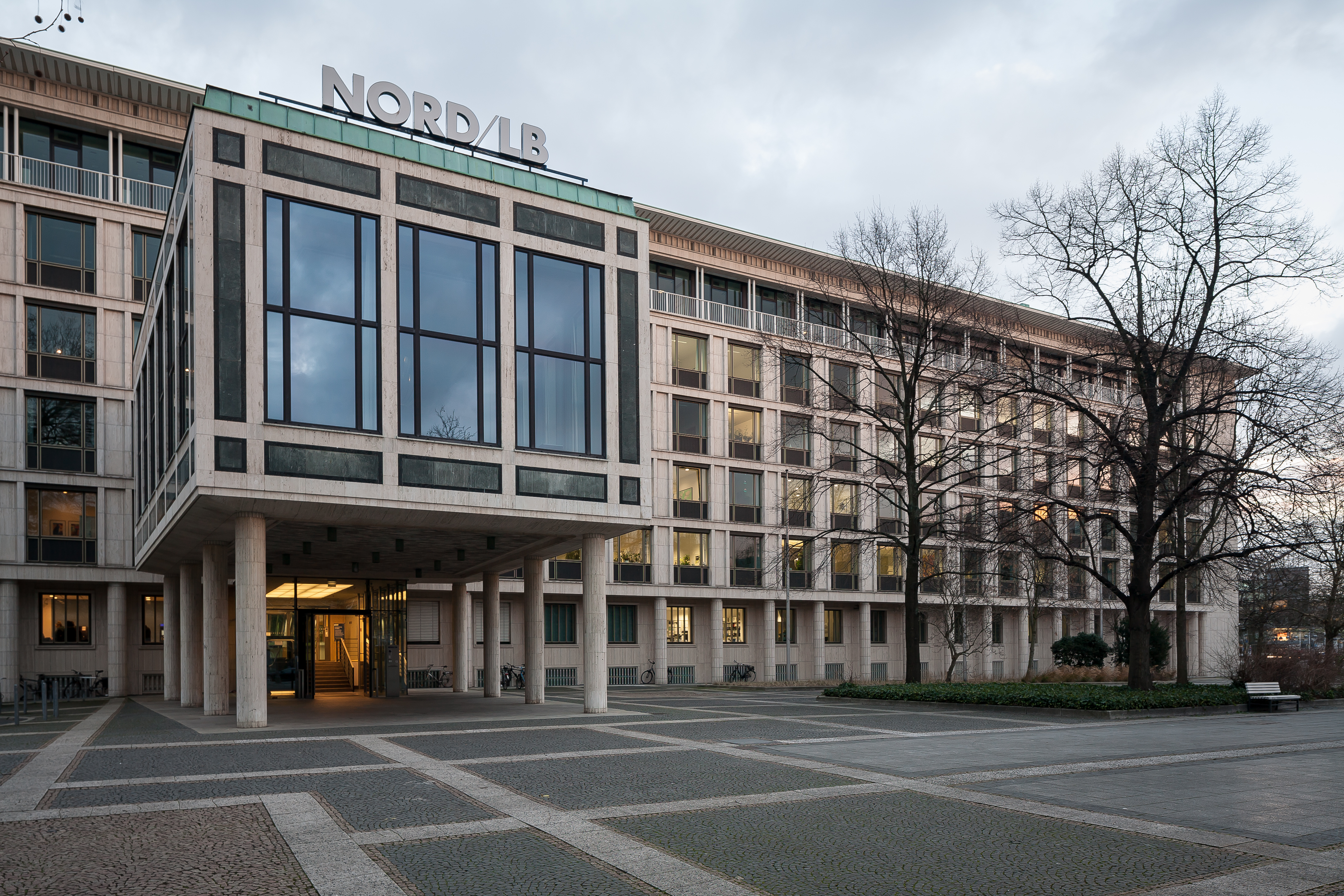
Building at Georgsplatz 2 in Hanover, head office of Niedersächsische Landesbank Girozentrale from 1958 to 1970, then of NORD/LB until 2002

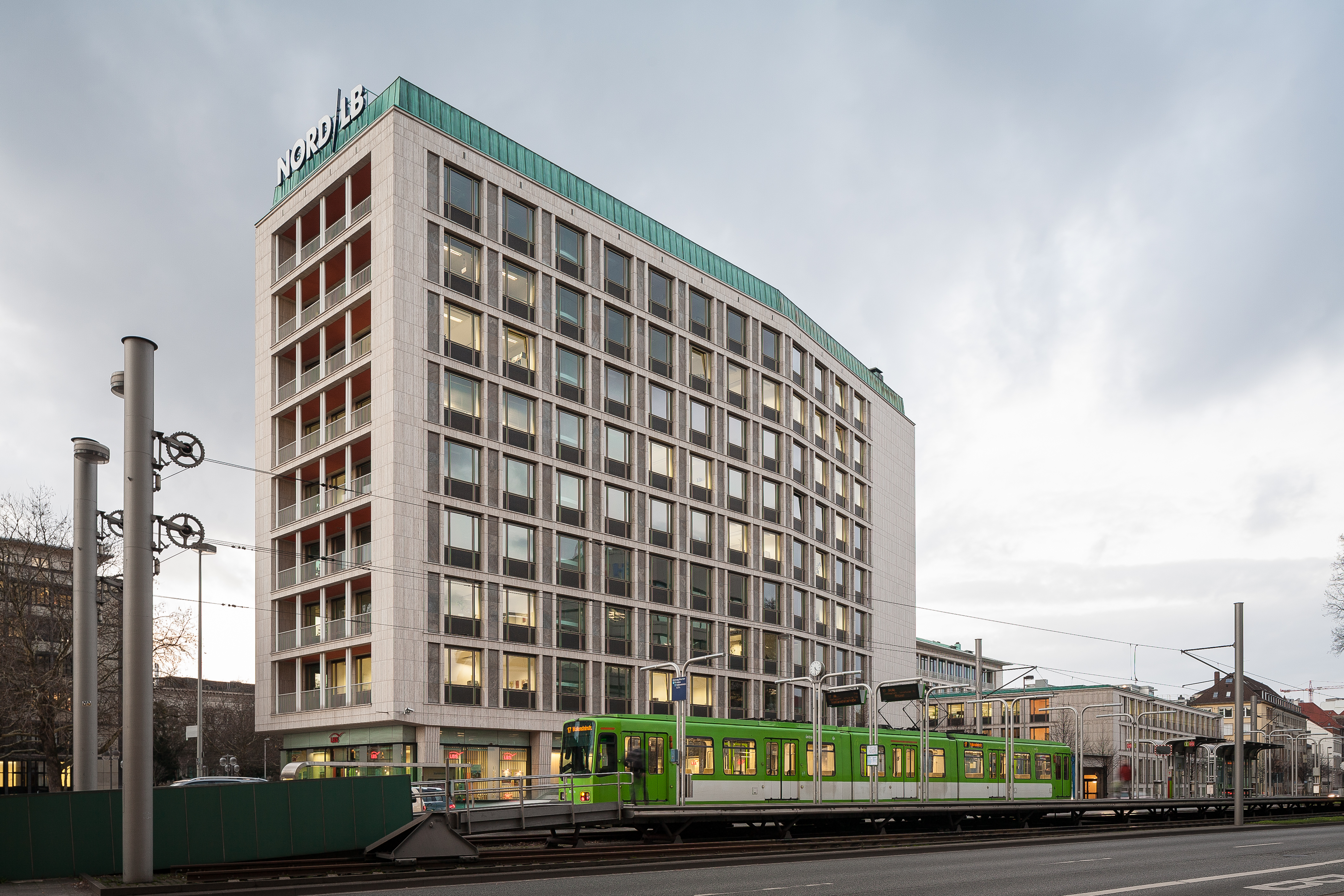
High-rise wing of the former Niedersächsische Landesbank Girozentrale complex in Hanover

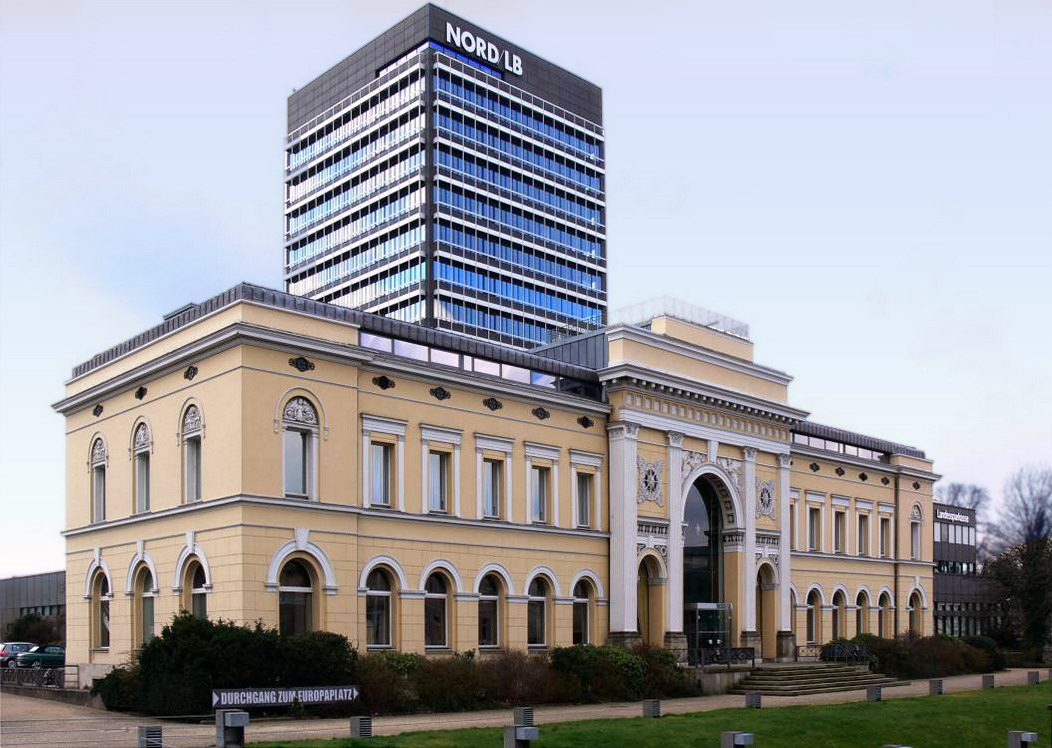
Former Alter Bahnhof building or Ottmerbau in Braunschweig, head office of Braunschweigische Staatsbank (1966–1970), Nord/LB (1970–2002), then Braunschweigische Landessparkasse (since 2008)

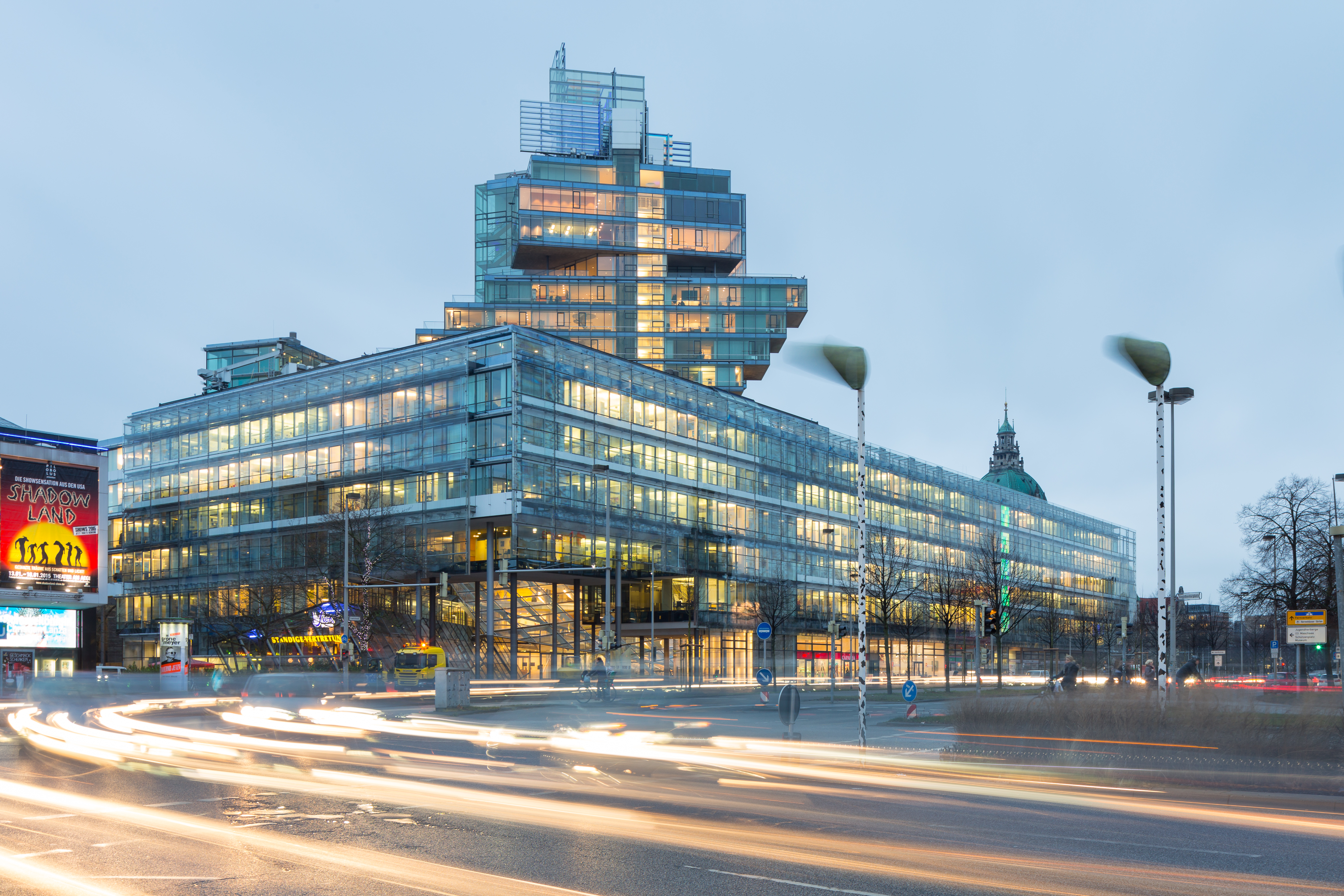
NORD/LB Head Office Building opened in 2002 in Hanover

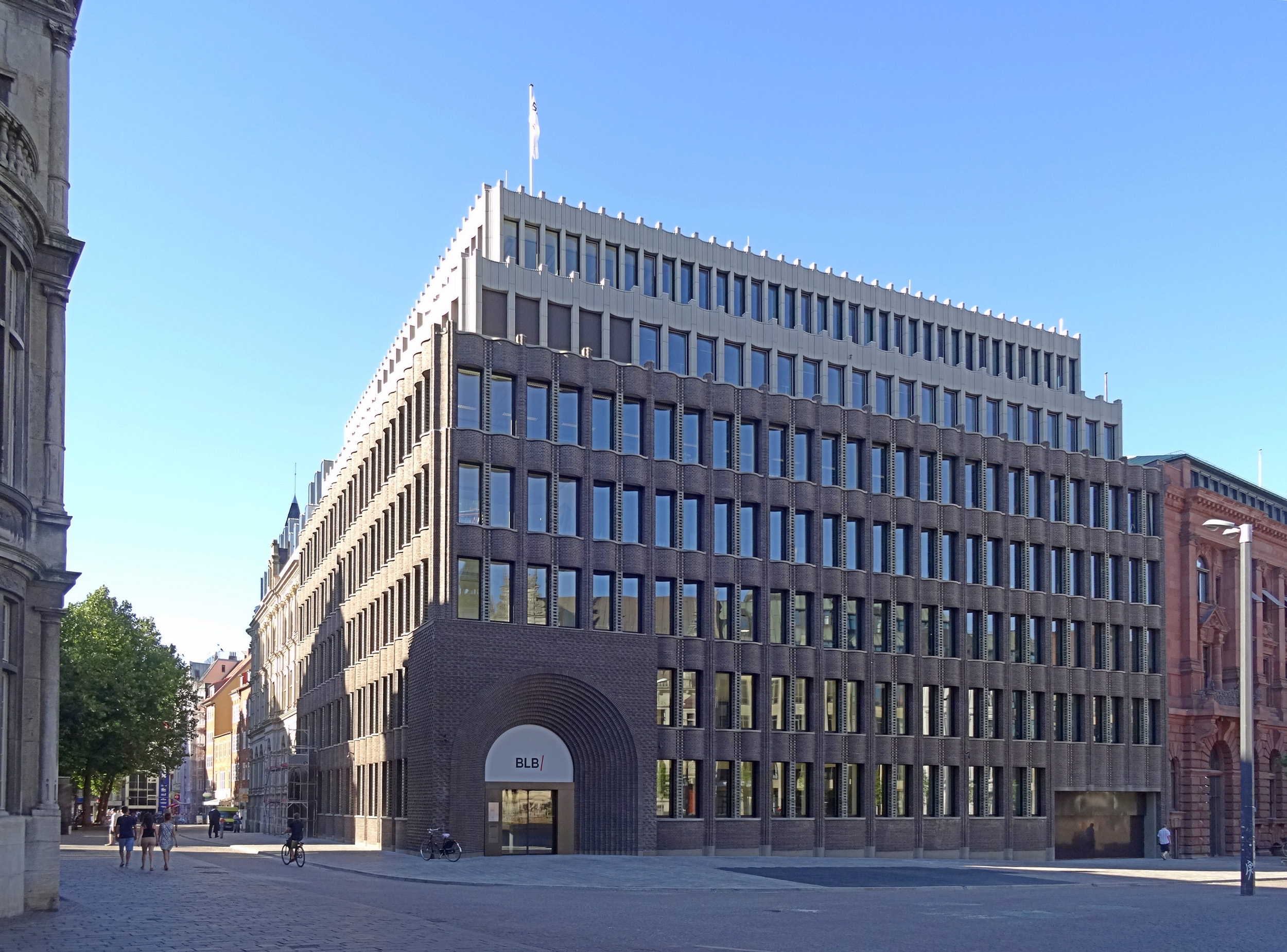
Former Bremer Landesbank head office in Bremen, inaugurated in 2016 a year before the bank's absorption by NORD/LB

=== Western-central Germany ===
- 1832: Provinzial-Hülfskasse Westfalen established in Münster, sometimes referred to as the first Landesbank
  - Landeskreditkasse established in Kassel
- 1840: Landeskreditkasse established in Wiesbaden, reorganized in 1849 as Nassauische Landesbank
- 1854: Rheinische Provinzial-Hülfskasse established in Cologne; relocated in 1877 to Düsseldorf, and renamed in 1888 Landesbank der Rheinprovinz
- 1890: Provinzial-Hülfskasse Westfalen renamed Landesbank der Provinz Westfalen
- 1903: Hessische Landes-Hypothekenbank AG established in Darmstadt
- 1914: Landesbank der Rheinprovinz becomes the payments clearing house (German: Girozentrale) for the savings banks in the Rheinisch-Westfälische Sparkassentag, in substitution of the Stadtsparkasse Köln which had taken up that role in 1911 for the Rhine Province of Prussia
- 1921: Westfälisches Pfandbriefamt für Hausgrundstücke established in Münster
- 1923: Hessische Landesbank - Staatsbank established in Darmstadt
- 1929: Landeskommunalbank - Girozentrale für Hessen established in Darmstadt
- 1931: Landesbank der Rheinprovinz in distress, suspends payments despite emergency liquidity assistance from Deutsche Girozentrale, Preussische Staatsbank and the Reichsbank; clearing house role transferred to the Cologne branch of the Deutsche Girozentrale
- 1935: Landesbank der Rheinprovinz renamed Rheinische Girozentrale und Provinzialbank
- 1940: Hessische Landesbank Darmstadt Girozentrale formed by merger of Landeskommunalbank - Girozentrale für Hessen, Hessische Landes-Hypothekenbank AG, and Hessische Landesbank - Staatsbank, with seat in Darmstadt
- 1941: Landesbank und Girozentrale Westmark established in Saarbrücken, renamed Landesbank und Girozentrale Saar in 1946 (also known as Landesbank Saar, later SaarLB)
- 1943: Landesbank für Westfalen (Girozentrale) formed by merger of Landesbank der Provinz Westfalen and Westfälisches Pfandbriefamt für Hausgrundstücke
- 1948: Landesbank und Girozentrale Kaiserslautern established in Kaiserslautern
- 1951: Saarländische Investitionskreditbank established in Saarbrücken
- 1953: Hessische Landesbank Girozentrale (Helaba) formed by merger of Landeskreditkasse Kassel, Nassauische Landesbank, and Hessische Landesbank Darmstadt Girozentrale, with seat in Frankfurt
- 1958: Landesbank Rheinland-Pfalz (LRP) formed by merger of the branch of the Rheinische Girozentrale und Provinzialbank in Koblenz, that of the Hessen-Nassauische Landesbank in Mainz and Landesbank und Girozentrale Kaiserslautern, with seat in Mainz
- 1969: Westdeutsche Landesbank Girozentrale (WestLB) formed by merger of Rheinische Girozentrale und Provinzialbank and Landesbank für Westfalen (Girozentrale), with joint head offices in Düsseldorf and Münster and branches in Cologne, Dortmund, Bielefeld, and Essen
- 1972: WestLB starts its international expansion by opening a branch in Luxembourg, followed by London in 1973 and New York in 1975
- 2002: WestLB spins off NRW.Bank, converts itself into a joint-stock company as WestLB AG, and sells its private banking business to Merck Finck Privatbankiers
  - Wirtschafts- und Infrastrukturbank Hessen (WI-Bank) established in Frankfurt and Offenbach am Main
- 2004: Investitions- und Strukturbank Rheinland-Pfalz established in Mainz
- 2012: WestLB dismantled with assets transferred to Portigon Financial Services; Landesbank role in North Rhine-Westphalia taken up by Helaba
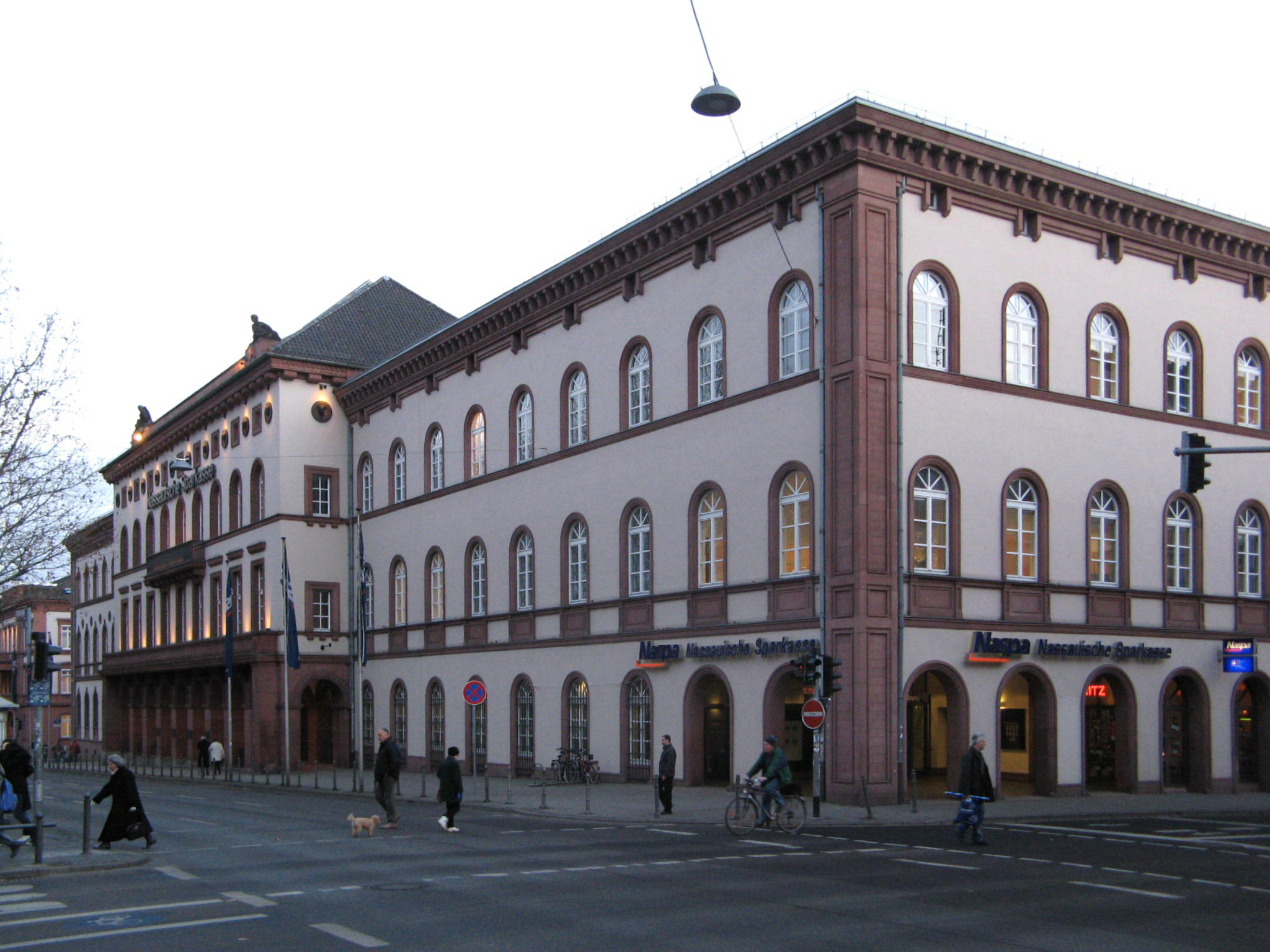
Former Nassauische Landesbank in Wiesbaden

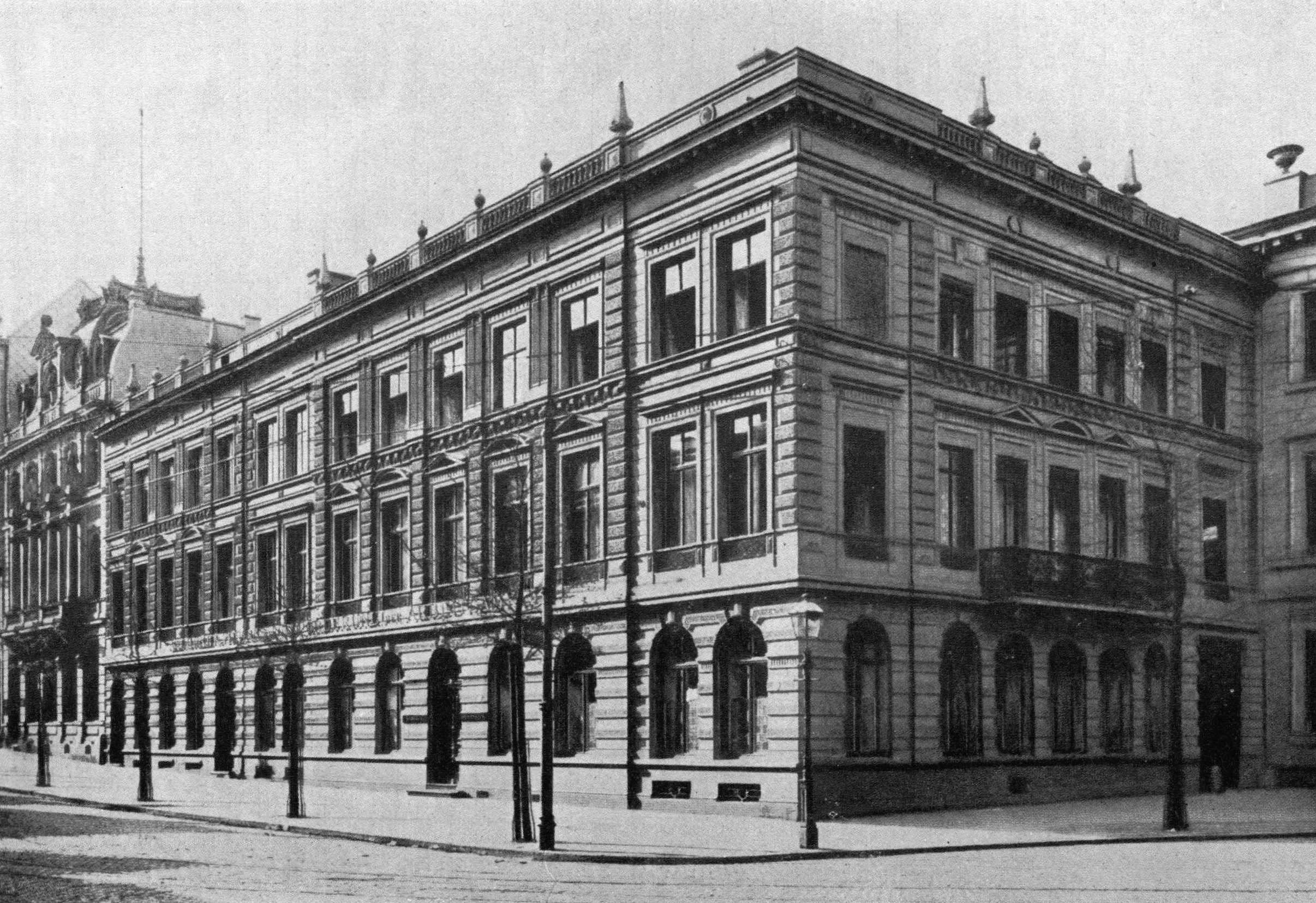
Former branch of Landesbank der Rheinprovinz in Aachen

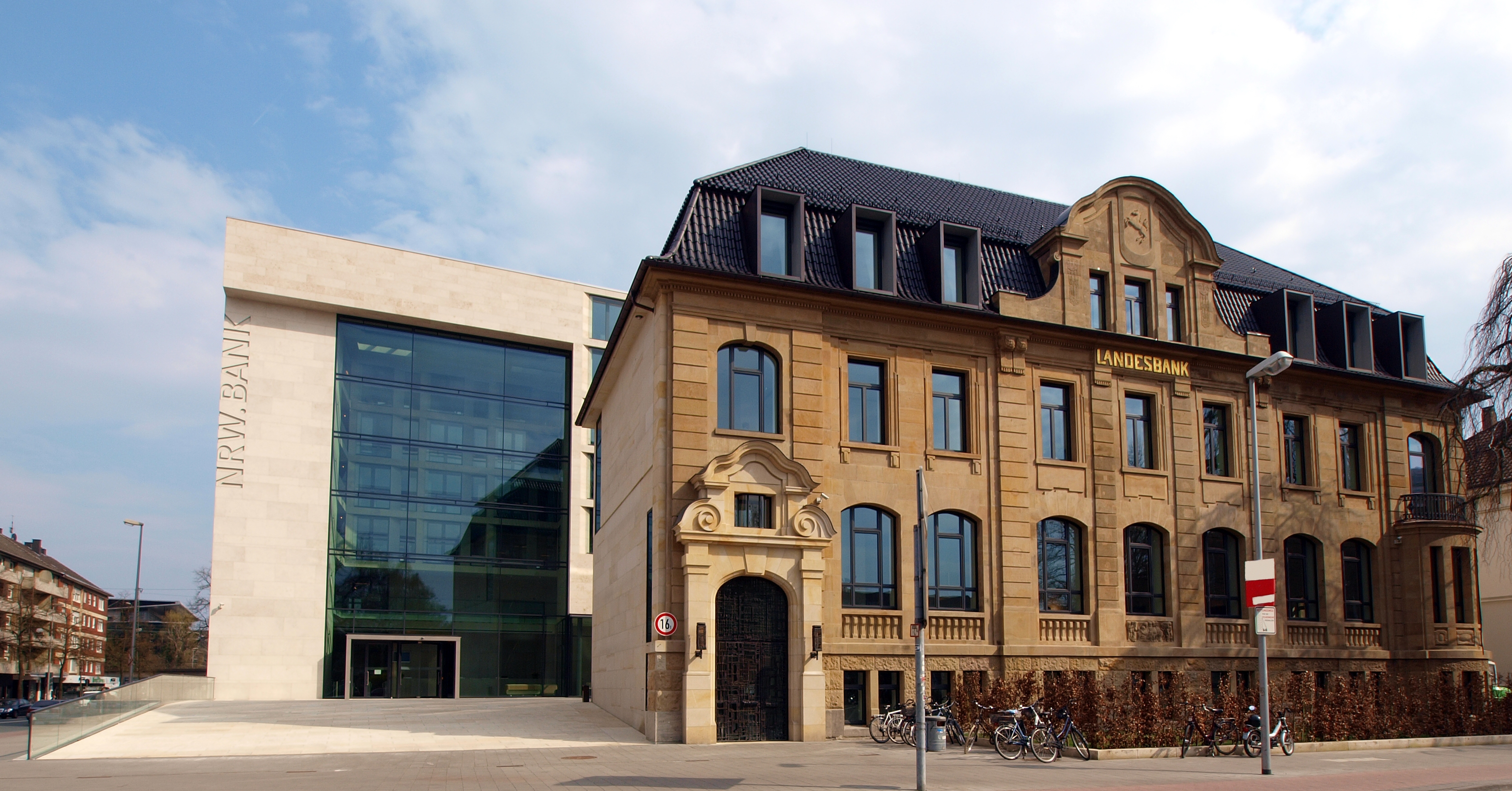
Former Landesbank der Provinz Westfalen in Münster

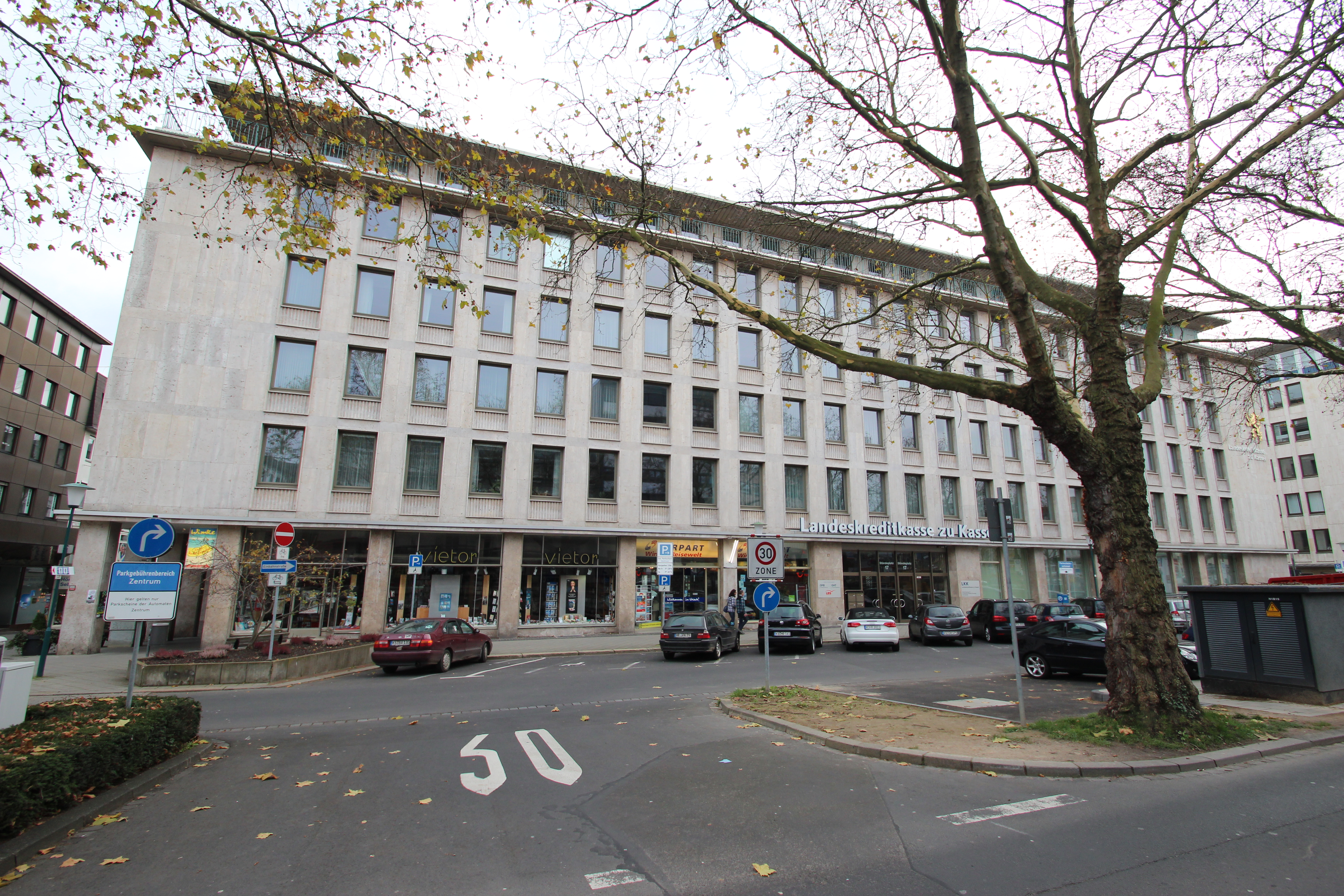
Landeskreditkasse building in Kassel

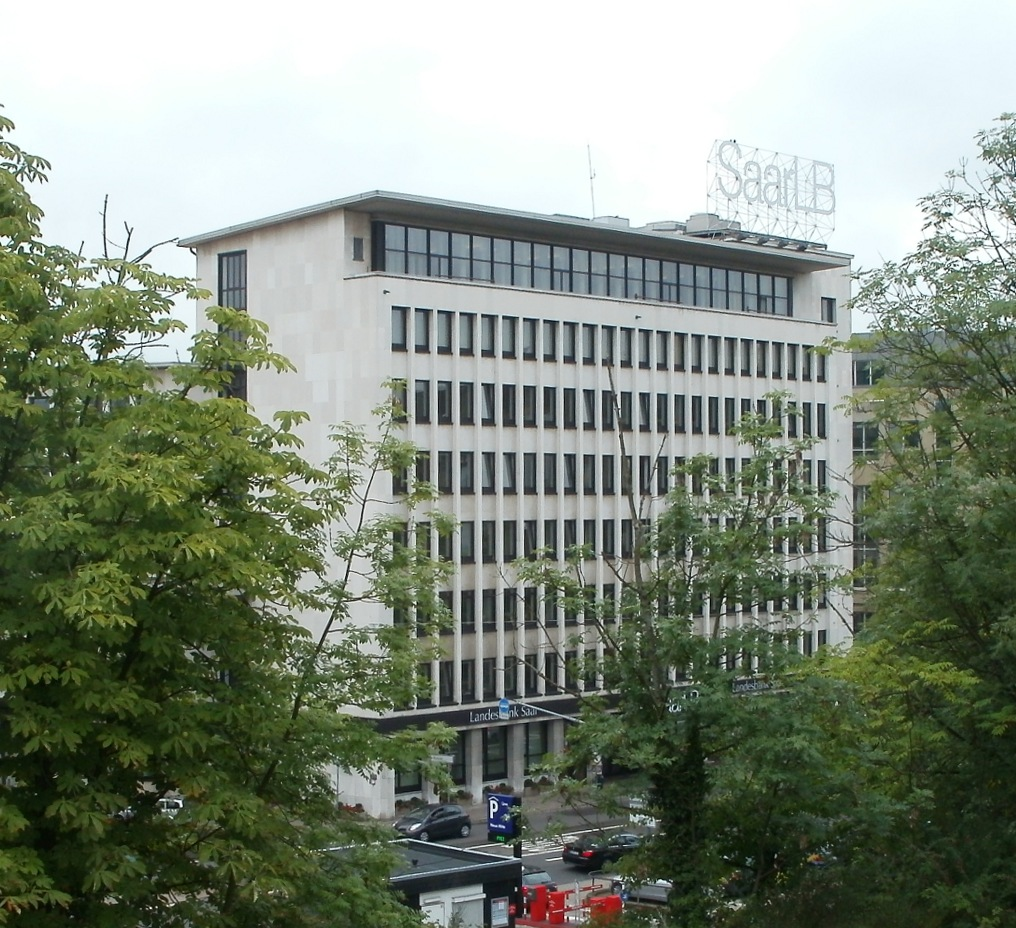
SaarLB head office in Saarbrücken, 2011

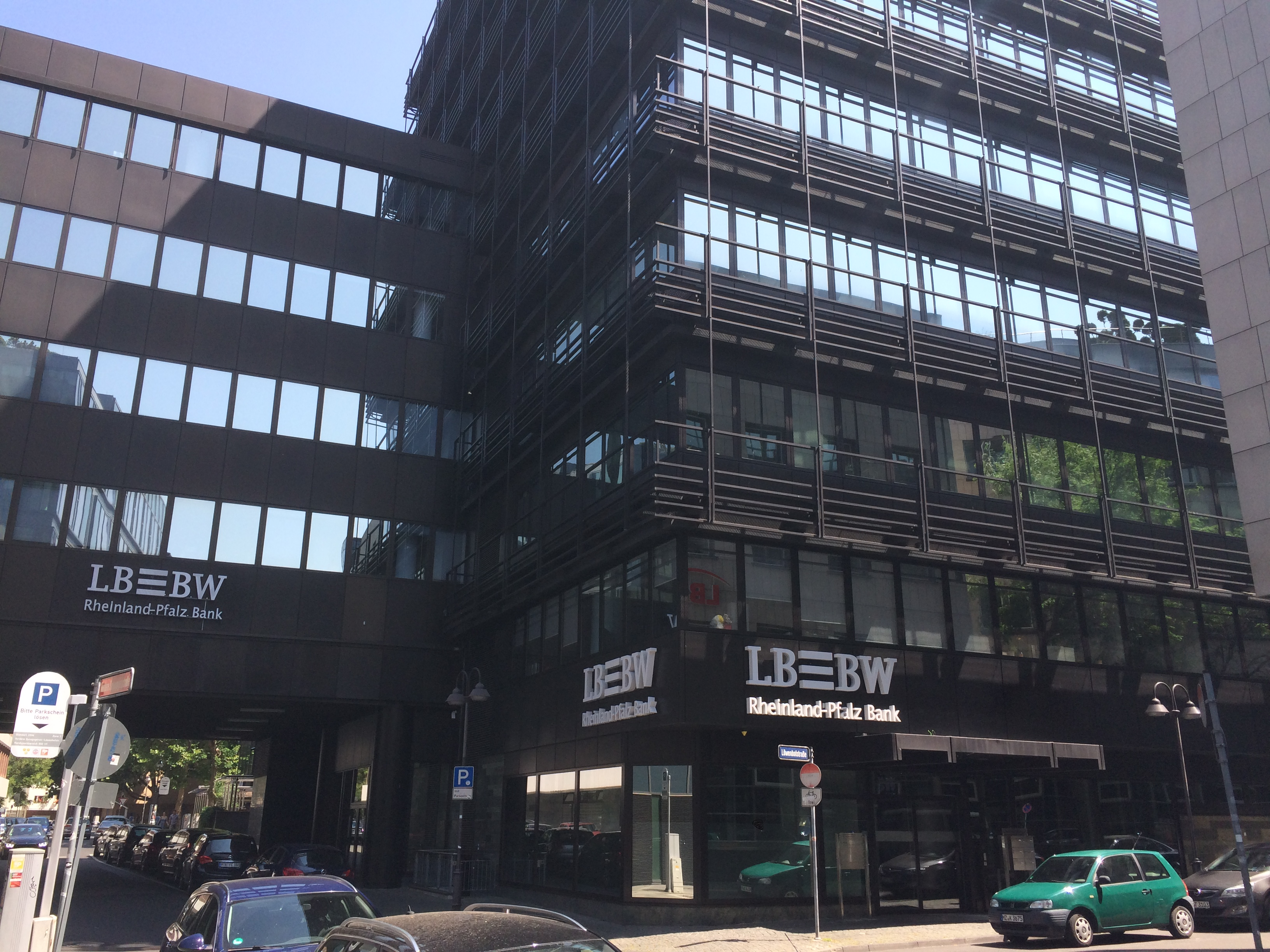
Former LRP head office in Mainz, 2015

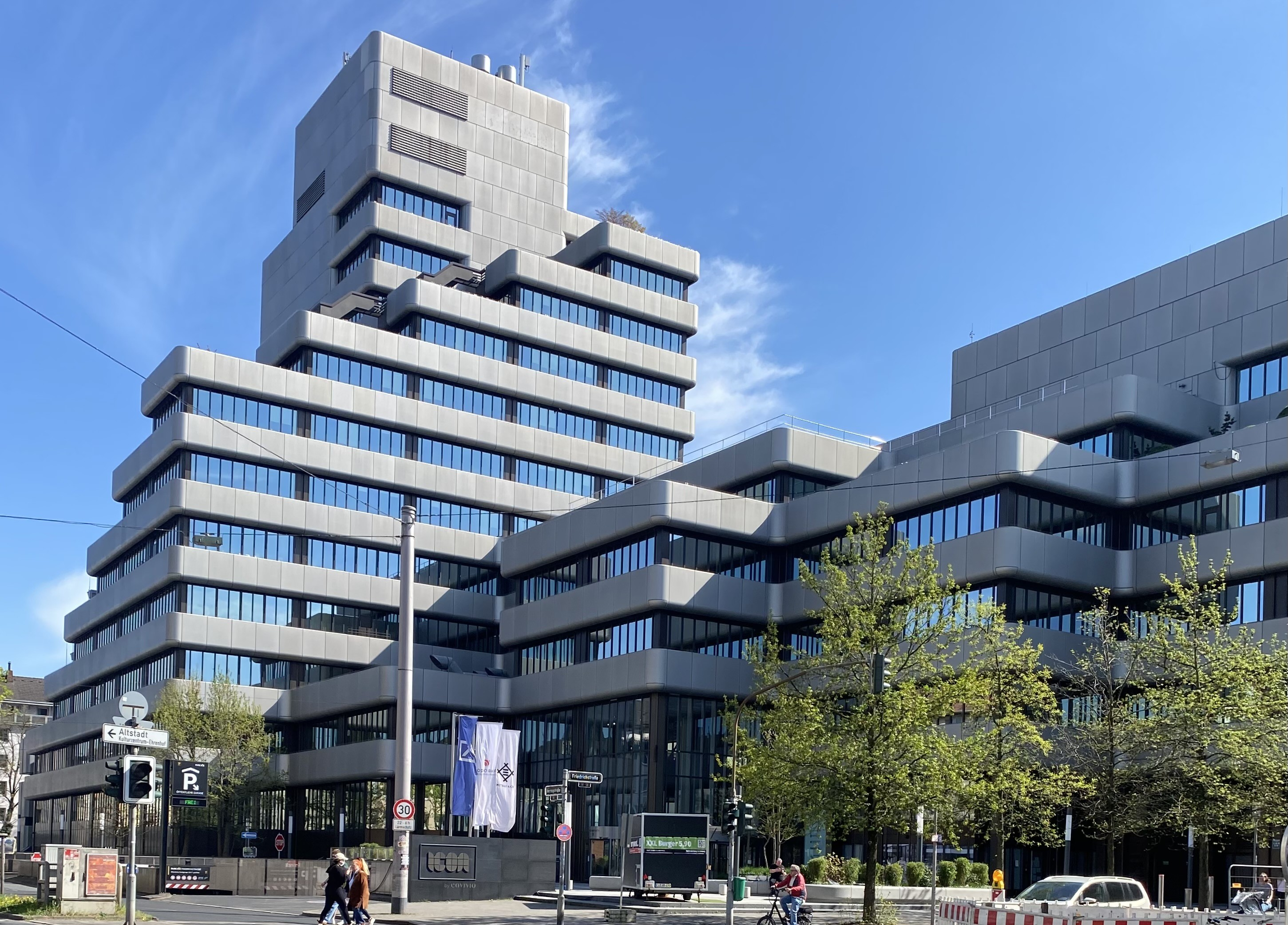
Building at Herzogstrasse 15 in Düsseldorf, built 1974–1986, head office of WestLB until 2012, now Herzogterrassen commercial complex

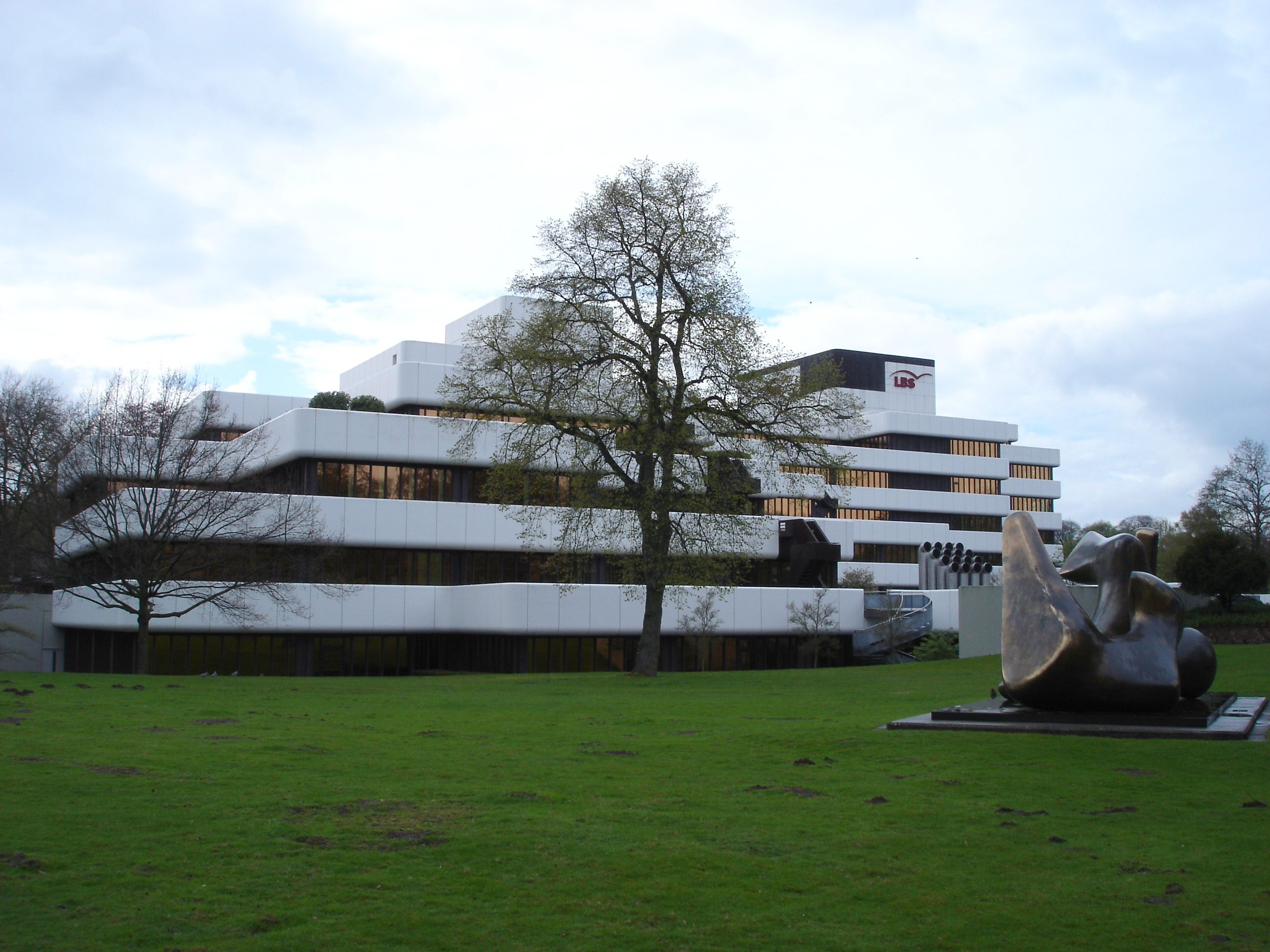
WestLB branch in Münster from 1975 to 2002, later head office of the regional Landesbausparkasse

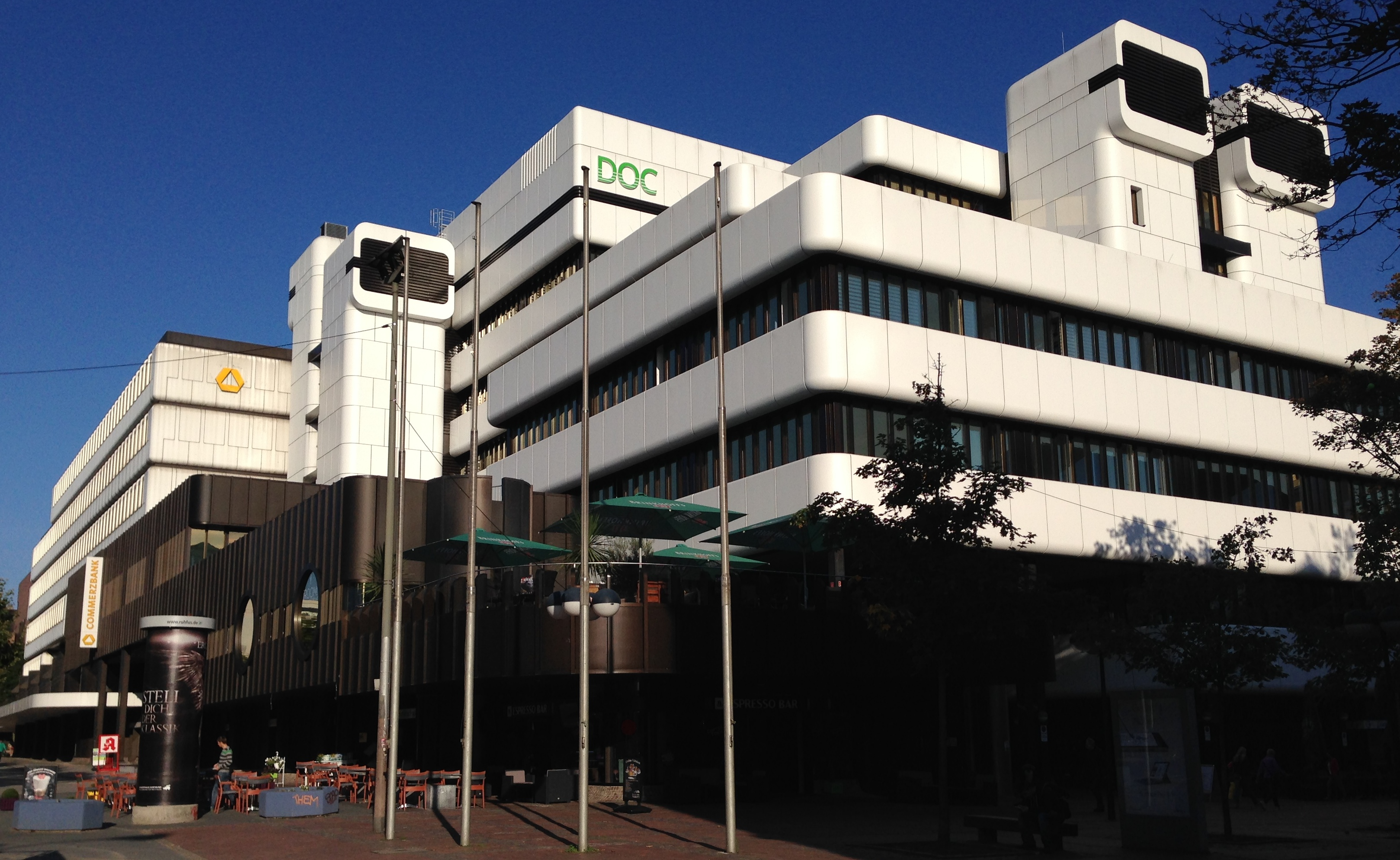
WestLB branch in Dortmund from 1978 to 2010, repurposed in 2014 as Dortmunder Centrum für Medizin & Gesundheit

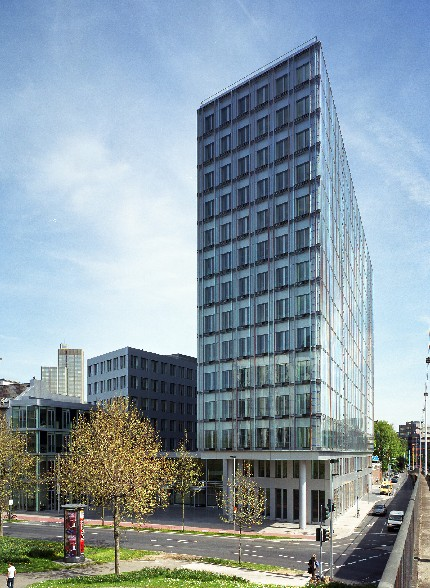
NRW.Bank head office in Düsseldorf

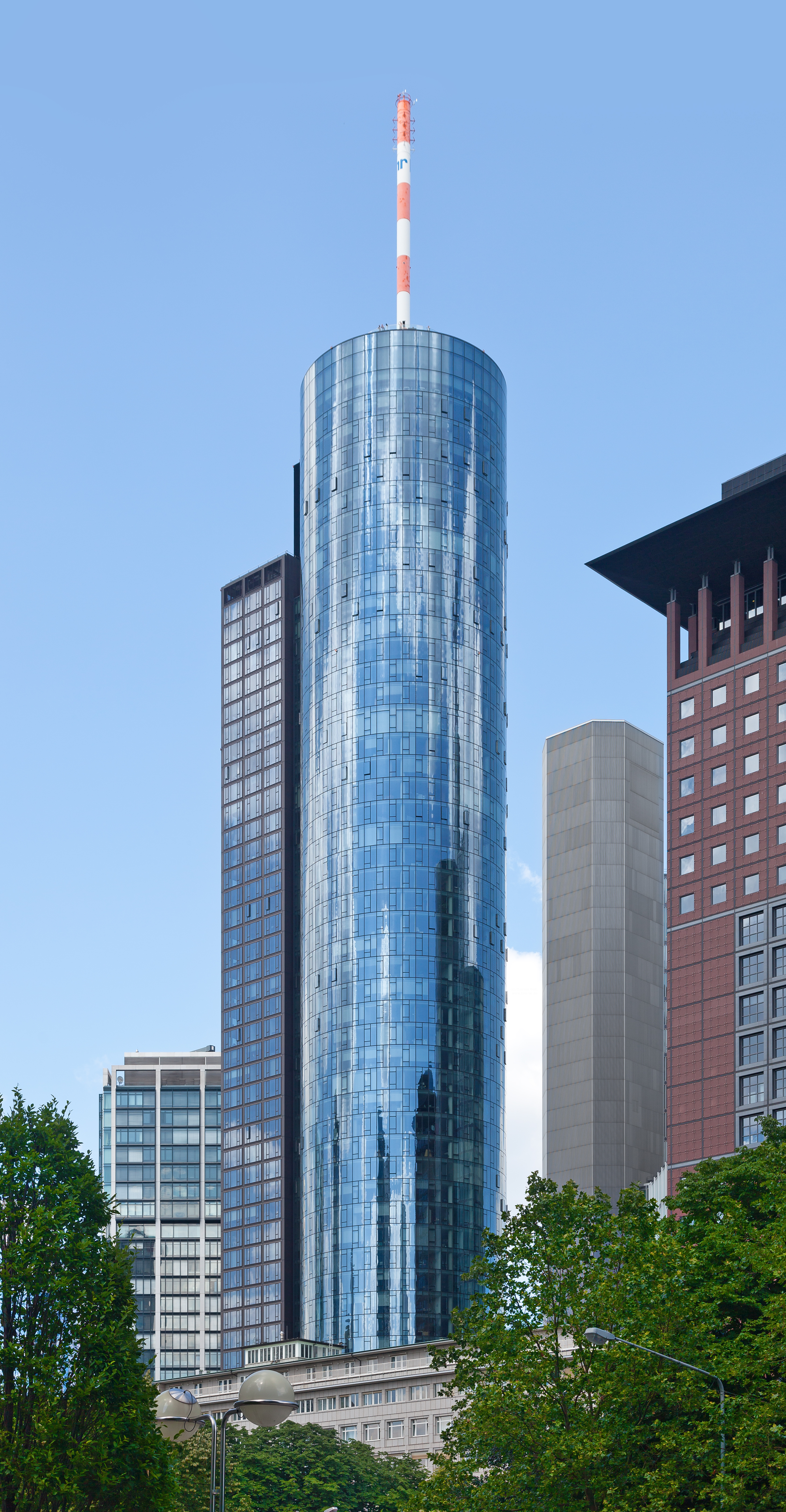
Helaba head office in Frankfurt, 2012

=== Southern Germany ===
- 1780: Hochfürstlich-Brandenburg-Anspach-Bayreuthische Hofbanco established in Ansbach, successively renamed as Königlich Baierische Banco (1806), Königliche Bank Nürnberg (1807), Königliche Filialbank in Munich (1875), and Bayerische Staatsbank (1918)
- 1818: Württembergische Landessparkasse established in Stuttgart as national savings bank of the Kingdom of Württemberg
- 1884: Landeskultur-Rentenanstalt established in Munich
  - Städtische Sparkasse Stuttgart established in Stuttgart
- 1914: Bayerische Girozentrale founded, permanently established in 1917 in Nuremberg and relocated in 1920 in Munich
- 1916: Zentralstelle des Württembergischen Giroverbands – Stuttgart established in Stuttgart, later renamed Landesbank Stuttgart
- 1923: Württembergische Notenbank (est. 1871 in Stuttgart) becomes government-owned
- 1924: Württembergische Wohnungskreditanstalt established in Stuttgart; renamed Württembergische Landeskreditanstalt in 1932
  - Badische Landeskreditanstalt für Wohnungsbau established in Karlsruhe
- 1925: Bayerische Girozentrale reorganized and renamed Bayerische Gemeindebank (Girozentrale) Öffentliche Bankanstalt
- 1929: Badische Kommunale Landesbank established in Mannheim
- 1931: Bank of Baden (est. 1870 in Mannheim) becomes government-owned; relocated to Karlsruhe in 1932
- 1934: Bank of Baden and Württembergische Notenbank deprived of their note-issuing role and repurposed as commercial entities; the latter renamed Württembergische Landeskommunalbank - Girozentrale (also known as Württembergische Bank) in 1935
- 1949: Landeskultur-Rentenanstalt renamed Bayerische Landesbodenkreditanstalt (Bayern Labo)
- 1951: LfA Förderbank Bayern established in Munich
- 1971: Bayerische Staatsbank privatized and acquired by Bayerische Vereinsbank
- 1972: Bayerische Landesbank Girozentrale (BayernLB) formed by merger of Bayerische Gemeindebank (Girozentrale) Öffentliche Bankanstalt and Bayerische Landesbodenkreditanstalt
  - Landeskreditbank Baden-Württemberg formed by merger of Württembergische Landeskreditanstalt and Badische Landeskreditanstalt für Wohnungsbau
- 1975: Landessparkasse – Girokasse öffentliche Bank formed by merger of Württembergische Landessparkasse and Städtische Spar- und Girokasse Stuttgart, renamed Landesgirokasse Stuttgart in 1977
- 1978: Baden-Württembergische Bank (BW-Bank) formed by merger of Bank of Baden, Württembergische Bank and private-sector Handelsbank Heilbronn, with seat in Stuttgart
- 1988: Südwestdeutsche Landesbank Girozentrale (SüdwestLB) formed by merger of Landesbank Stuttgart and Badische Kommunale Landesbank, with seat in Stuttgart
- 1998: Landeskreditbank Baden-Württemberg – Förderbank (L-Bank) formed from the development finance activities of Landeskreditbank Baden-Württemberg
- 1999: Landesbank Baden-Württemberg (LBBW) formed by merger of SüdwestLB, Landesgirokasse Stuttgart and the commercial activities of Landeskreditbank Baden-Württemberg
- 2005: BW-Bank merged into LBBW
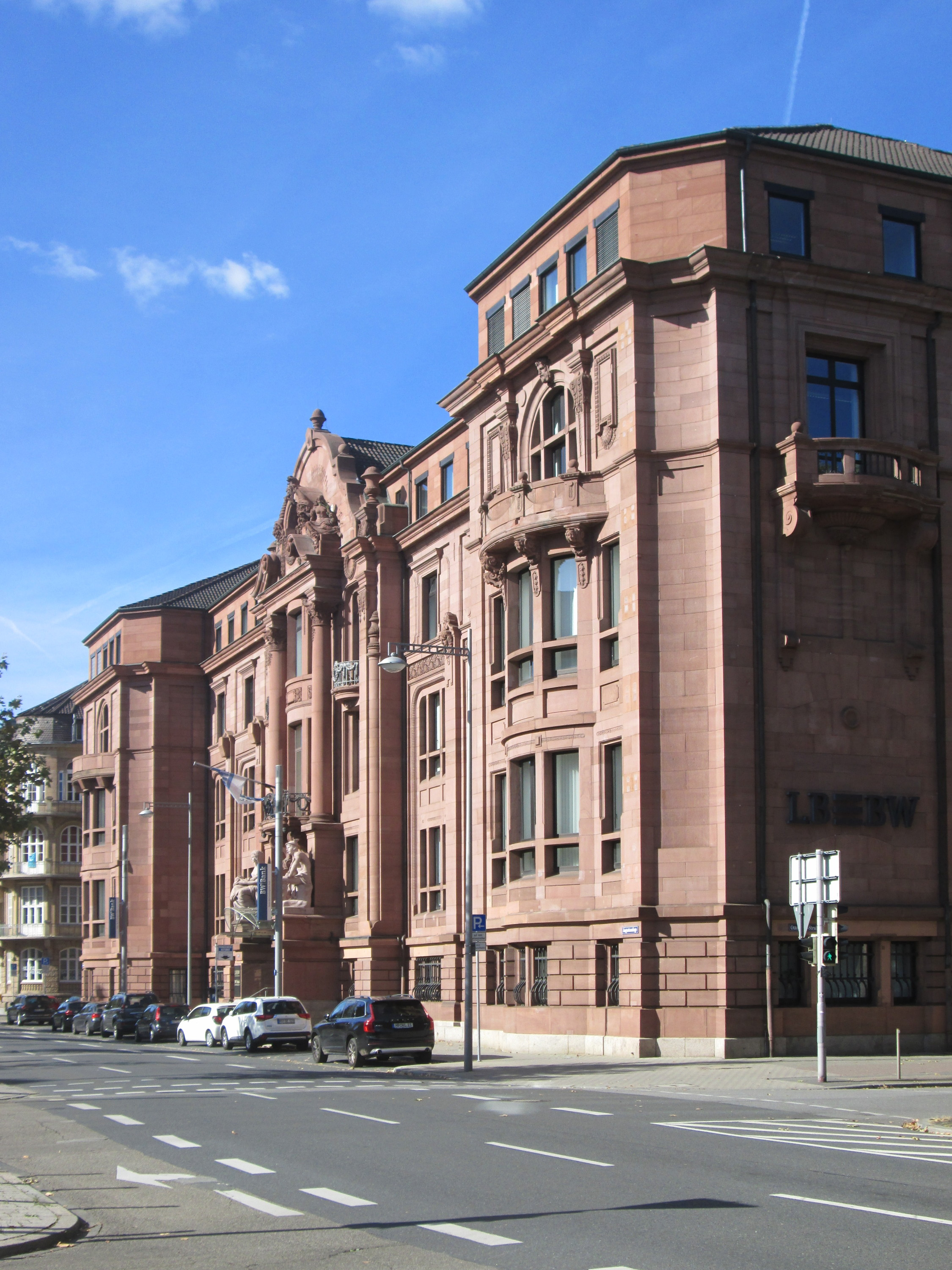
Former head office of Badische Kommunale Landesbank in Mannheim, 2018

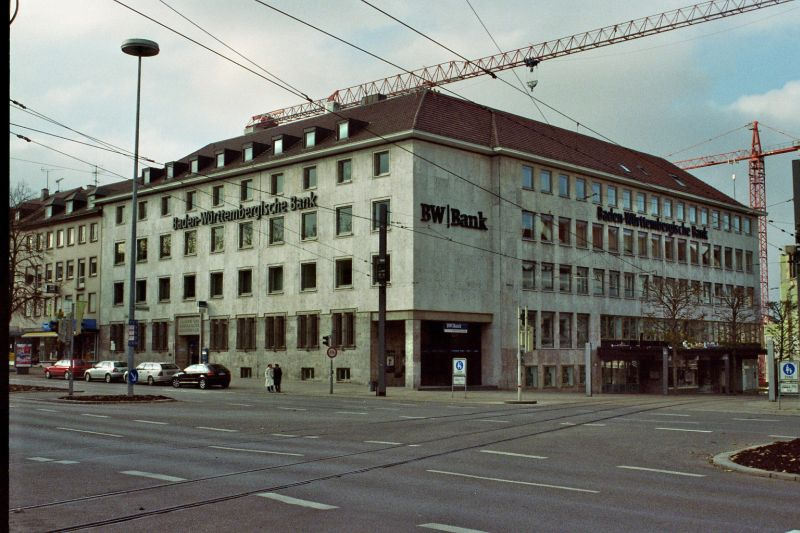
BW-Bank in Heilbronn, 2007

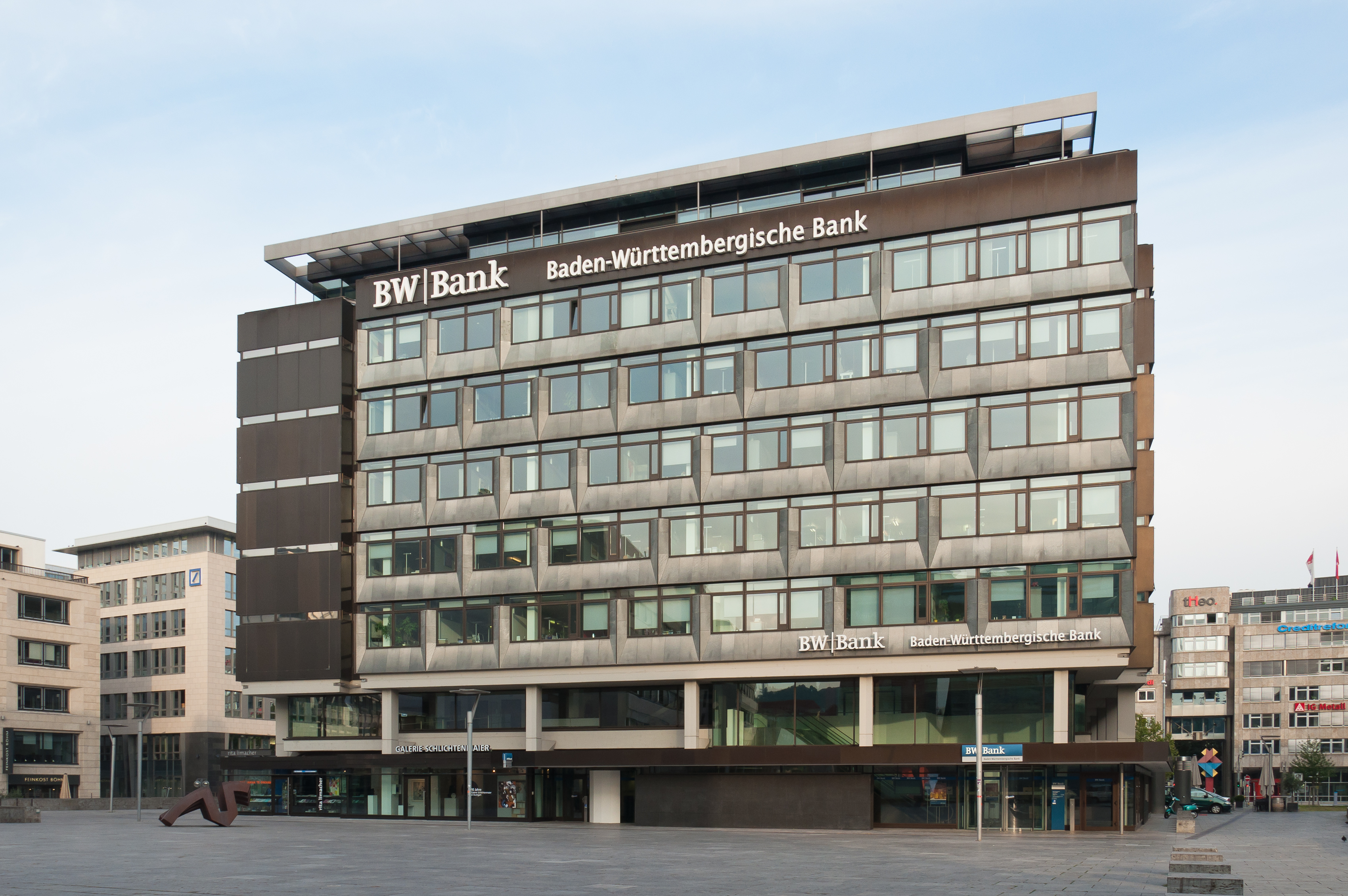
BW-Bank in Stuttgart, 2013

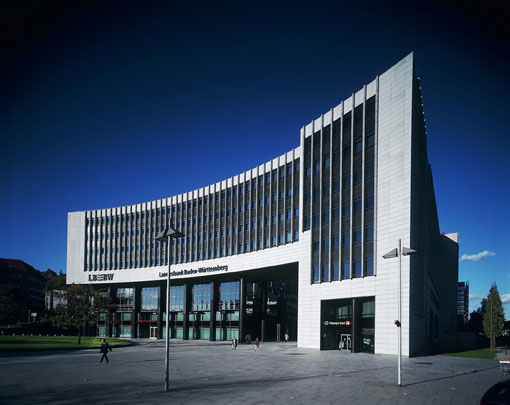
LBBW head office in Stuttgart, 2007

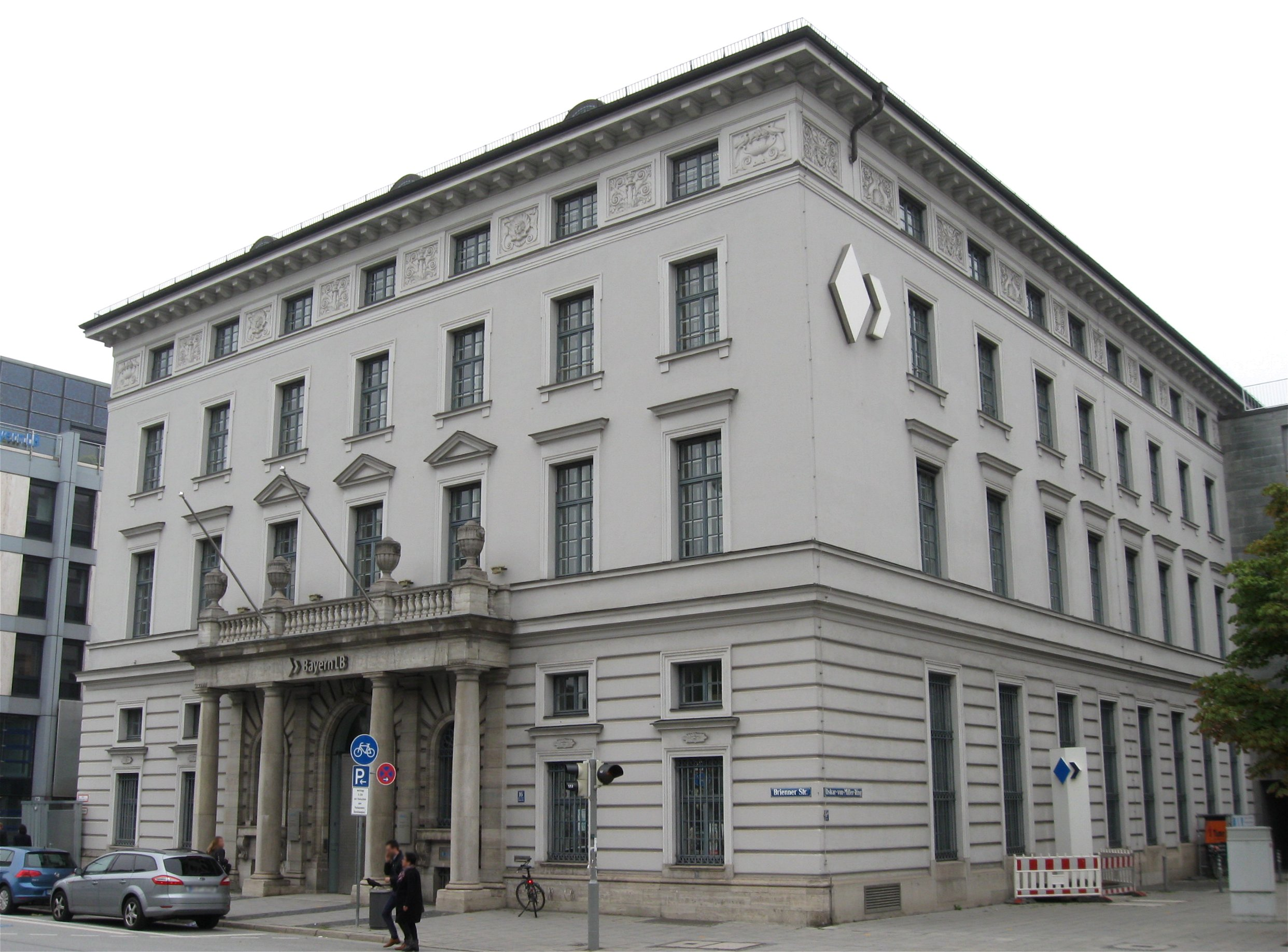
BayernLB head office in Munich, 2013

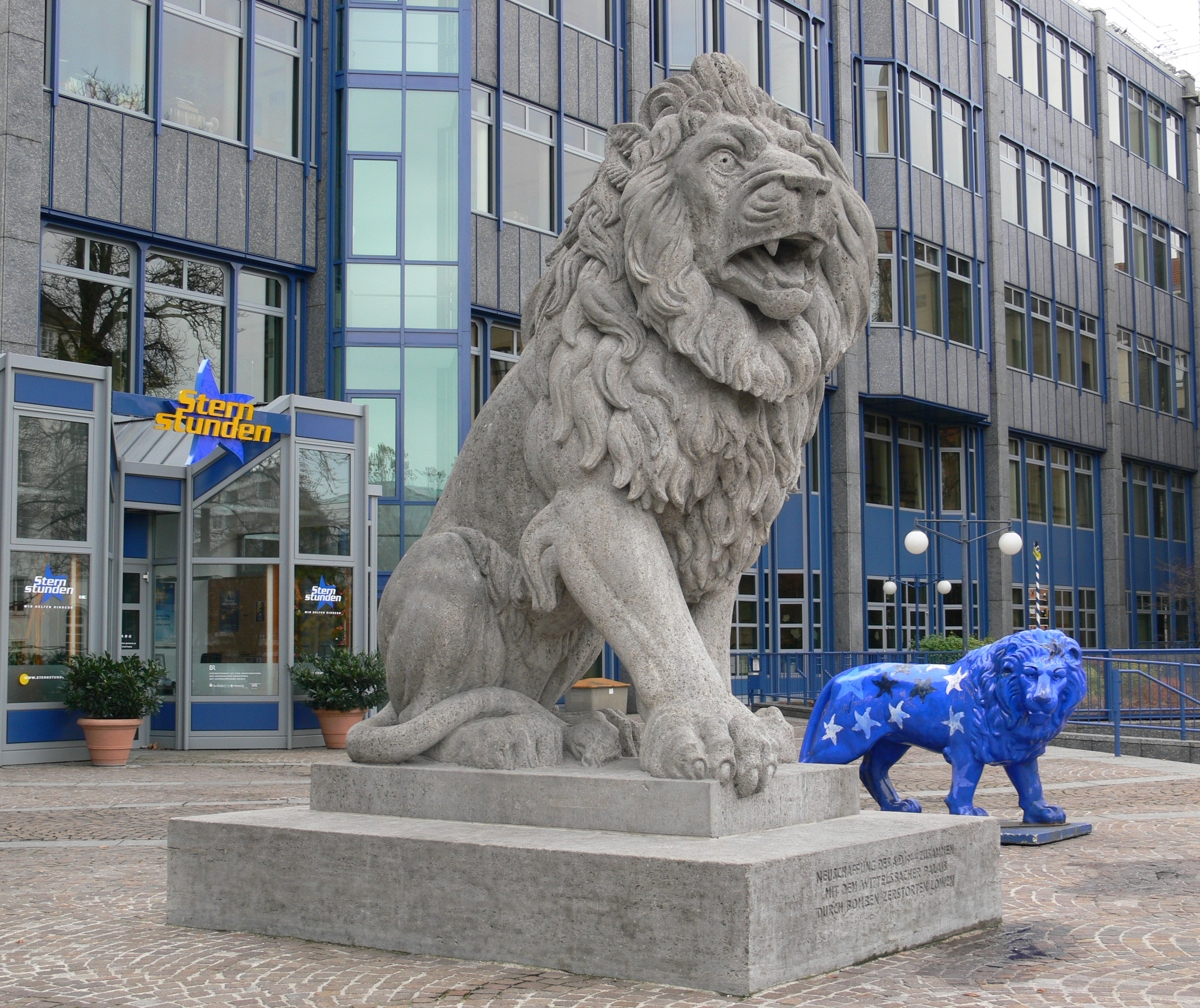
Lion statue in front of BayernLB head office in Munich, 2009

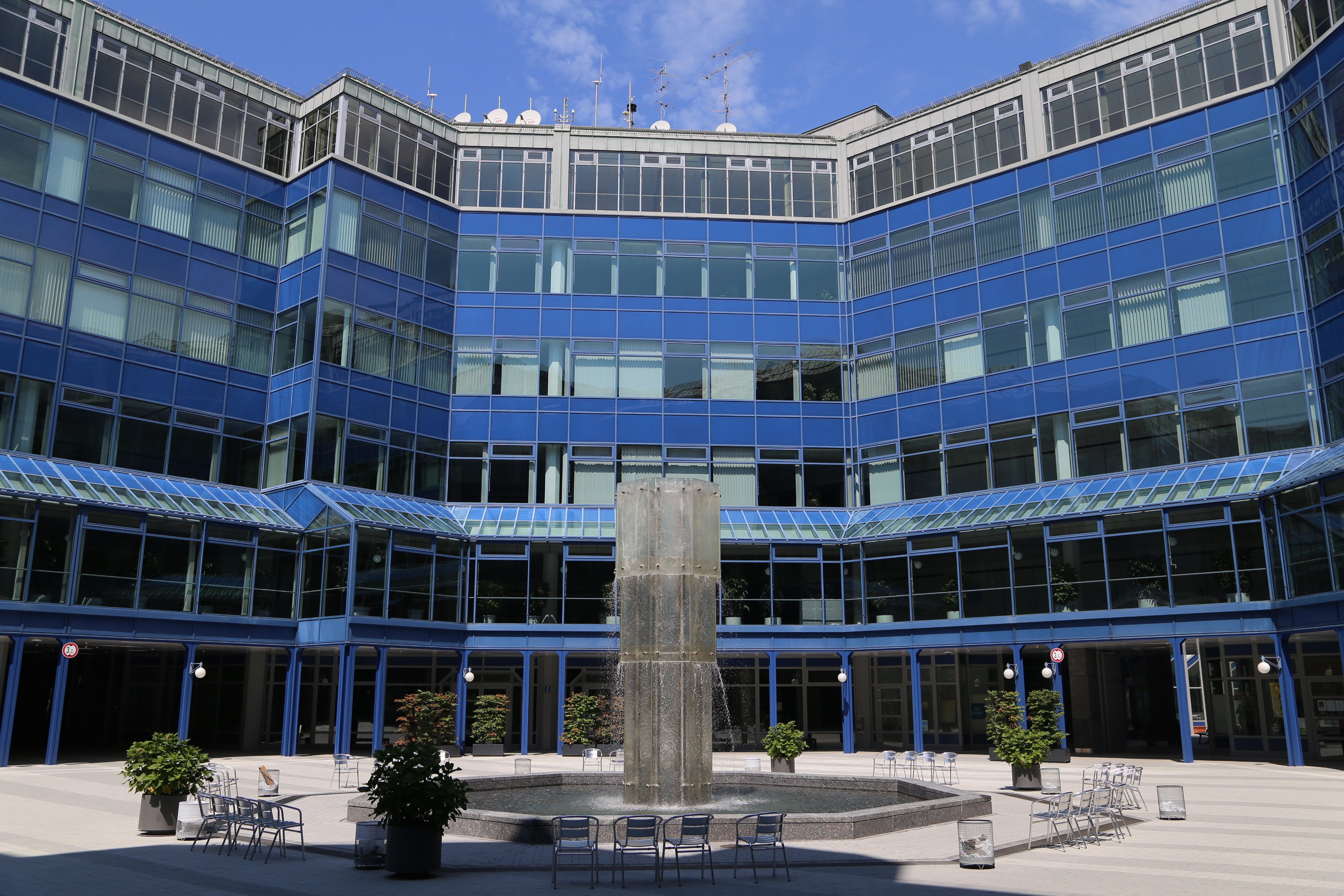
Courtyard of BayernLB head office in Munich, 2014

=== Cross-regional consolidation ===
- 1992: Hessische Landesbank Girozentrale takes up Landesbank role in Thuringia, and is renamed Landesbank Hessen-Thüringen Girozentrale while keeping the shorthand name Helaba
  - NORD/LB takes up Landesbank role in Saxony-Anhalt
- 1993: NORD/LB takes up Landesbank role in Mecklenburg-Vorpommern
- 2001: BayernLB acquires majority control of SaarLB
- 2005: LRP merged into LBBW
- 2007: SachsenLB acquired by LBBW
- 2010-2013: Saarland acquires control of SaarLB from BayernLB

== National representation ==
Two overlapping organizations represent the German public banking sector: the Deutscher Sparkassen- und Giroverband (DSGV), the umbrella organization for the Sparkassen-Finanzgruppe; and the Association of German Public Banks, which brings together the Landesbanks (also members of the DSGV) and the Förderbanken.

== See also ==
- Public bank
- Sparkassen-Finanzgruppe
- German Banking Industry Committee
- List of banks in Germany
