= Investitionsbank Sachsen-Anhalt =

German regional promotional bank

The bank's logo

Investitionsbank Sachsen-Anhalt (IB) is the regional promotional bank (German: Förderbank) in the German state of Saxony-Anhalt. It was established in 2004, initially as Landesförderinstitut Sachsen-Anhalt, and is headquartered in Magdeburg

Together with other German: Förderbanken and the more commercially oriented Landesbanken, IB Sachsen-Anhalt is a member of the Association of German Public Banks (VÖB).

== See also ==
- KfW
- German public banking sector
- List of banks in Germany
