= Thüringer Aufbaubank =

Coordinates: 50.971762°N 11.018123°E

- Company type: Public institution
- Industry: Institute for promotion
- Founded: 1992; 34 years ago
- Headquarters: Erfurt, Germany
- Total assets: €3.86 billion (2017)
- Number of employees: 643 (2017)
- Website: www.aufbaubank.de

The Thüringer Aufbaubank (TAB) is a German development finance institution of the Free State of Thuringia. It is a public institution and was founded in 1992. The first chairman of the board was Carl-Ludwig Wagner. The sole shareholder is the Free State. It has assumed the guarantor liability and the maintenance liability. Legal supervision of the bank lies with the Thuringian Ministry of Finance.

== Tasks and instruments ==
The tasks of the bank include, in addition to economic development, the promotion of housing and urban development, the promotion of technology, the financing of public customers, agriculture, environmental protection and infrastructure. The Aufbaubank offers low-interest loans and subsidies. In addition, it issues guarantees. Its subsidiary bm-t beteiligungsmanagement thüringen gmbh also allows Thuringian companies to obtain equity capital. The bank's target groups are companies, homeowners, municipalities, municipal companies and farmers. The Aufbaubank works closely with banks and savings banks as well as with the other development banks of the federal and state governments.

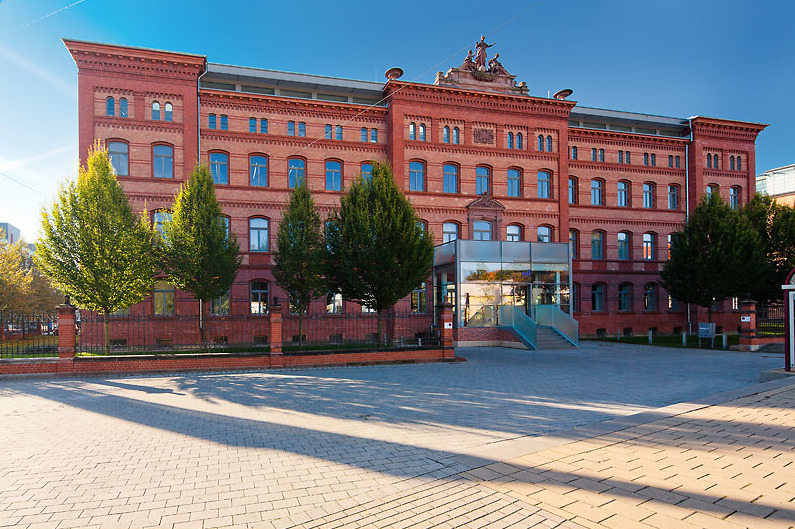
The bank's headquarters since 2002: the historic Benary building in the district of Brühl in Erfurt (Photo: Jan Kobel, Arnstadt)

== Refinancing of the bank ==
The lending business of the development bank is fully refinanced on the money and capital markets. To this end, the bank issues bonds or resorts to funds from financing agreements. The bank is legally limited. For example, it may not enter into currency risks and has to conclude its business exclusively in Euros. The Aufbaubank enjoys the highest solvency rating (Solva zero).

== Significant investments ==
- bm-t Beteiligungsmanagement Thüringen gmbh
- Mittelständische Beteiligungsgesellschaft Thüringen mbH
- Bürgschaftsbank Thüringen
- Gesellschaft für Arbeits- und Wirtschaftsförderung des Freistaates Thüringen mbH (GfAW)

== See also ==
- German public banking sector
- List of banks in Germany
