= DVB Bank =

German commercial transport finance company

DVB Bank SE
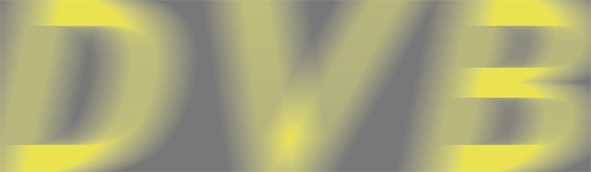
- Company type: Societas Europaea
- ISIN: DE0008045501
- Industry: Banking
- Founded: 1923
- Defunct: 12 August 2022
- Headquarters: Frankfurt, Germany
- Area served: Worldwide
- Key people: Ralf Bedranowsky (CEO), Rainer Jakubowski
- Products: Financial services
- AUM: €10.2 billion (2020)
- Owner: DZ BANK (100%)
- Number of employees: 329 (2020)
- Website: www.dvbbank.com

DVB Bank SE is part of the DZ BANK Group and a specialist in international transportation finance, based in Frankfurt/Main, Germany.

The bank was listed on the Frankfurt Exchange and today is wholly owned by DZ BANK. About 330 employees work at the offices in Frankfurt/Main, Amsterdam, London, Curaçao, Singapore and Tokyo.

== History ==
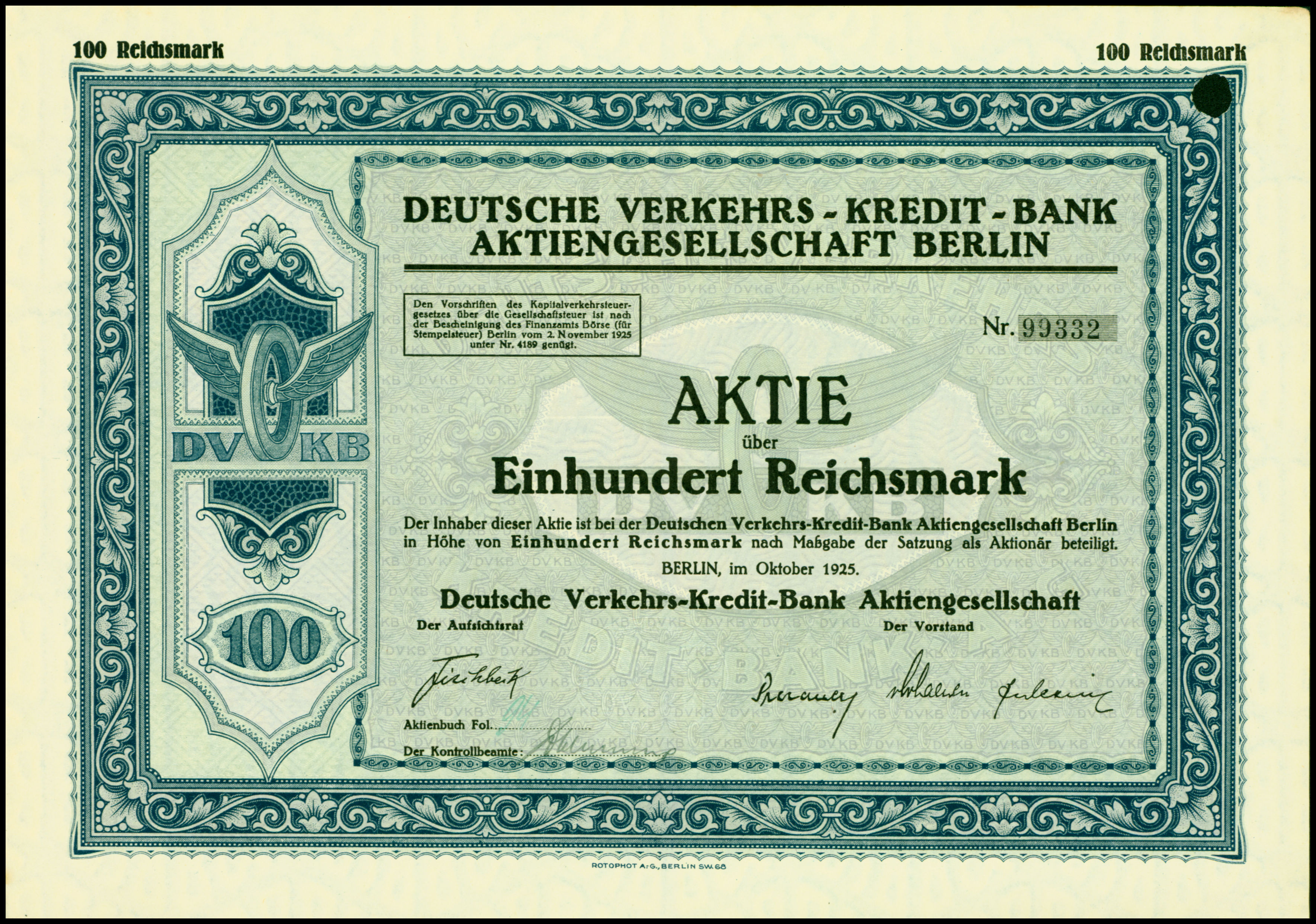
Share of the Deutsche Verkehrs-Kredit-Bank AG, issued October 1925

The institute was founded on 18 May 1923 as Deutsche Verkehrs-Kredit-Bank AG (German traffic credit-Bank AG; DVKB) by several banks and industrial companies, initially to freight deferrals for the German Reichsbahn.

After World War II, DVKB, specialized in cargo deferral, which was fixed by law. 1949 after the unification of the two main locations in Frankfurt and Hamburg, the head office in Frankfurt was established. It also operated numerous branches in other German cities.

In 1988, the DVKB was placed on the stock exchange, the German Federal Railways held 75.1 percent stake. In 1991, it was named Deutsche Verkehrs-Bank AG (German traffic Bank AG), in 1997 named Deutsche VerkehrsBank AG (German Transport AG) and 2002 changed its name again to DVB Bank AG. Since 1 October 2008, it has been trading as DVB Bank SE.

As a consequence of the financial crisis, DVB suffered from exposure to a prolonged slump in the global container shipping industry. DZ Bank entered talks to sell DVB to Japan's Mitsubishi UFJ Financial Group in 2015, but no deal materialized at the time.

In 2017, DZ Bank bought out minority shareholders in DVB, facilitating a sale of the business. The following year, it put individual tranches of DVB up for sale after failing to find a buyer for the business as a whole, partly due to low offers and its pressured shipping business. By early 2019, Mitsubishi UFJ Financial Group agreed to buy the entire DVB aviation financing portfolio, which stood at 5.6 billion euros ($6.37 billion) at the time.

== Shareholders ==
As part of a squeeze-out under stock corporation law, the shares of all DVB minority shareholders were transferred to DZ Bank in August 2017. Subsequently, trading in DVB Bank SE shares on the Frankfurt Stock Exchange was discontinued.

== Financials ==
Consolidated net income before taxes amounted to EUR-294.8 million in 2020. Total assets totaled EUR10.2 billion and DVB's nominal volume of customer lending was EUR3.9 billion.
