= Counter-Reformation =

Catholic response to the Protestant Reformation

The Counter-Reformation (Latin: Contrareformatio), also sometimes called the Catholic Revival or the Catholic Reformation, was the period of Catholic resurgence that was initiated in response to and as an alternative to, or from similar insights as, the Protestant Reformation. It was a comprehensive effort arising from the decrees of the Council of Trent.

As a political-historical period, it is frequently dated to have begun with the Council of Trent (1545–1563) and to have ended with the political conclusion of the European wars of religion in 1648, though this is controversial.

The effort produced apologetic and polemical documents, anti-corruption efforts, internal reform, spiritual movements, the promotion of new religious orders, and the flourishing of new art and musical styles. War and discriminatory legislation caused large migrations of religious refugees. Such reforms included the formation of seminaries for the proper training of priests in the spiritual life and the theological traditions of the Church, the reform of religious life by returning orders to their spiritual foundations, and new spiritual movements focusing on the devotional life and a personal relationship with Christ, including the Spanish mystics and the French school of spirituality. It also involved political activities and the use of regional Inquisitions.

A primary emphasis of the Counter-Reformation was a mission to reach parts of the world that had been colonized by predominantly Catholic nations, and an attempt to reconvert nations such as Sweden and England that once were Catholic from the time of the Christianisation of Europe, but had been lost to the Reformation. Various Counter-Reformation theologians focused only on defending doctrinal positions such as the sacraments and pious practices that were attacked by the Protestant reformers up to the Second Vatican Council.

== Terminology ==
'Counter-Reformation’ is a translation of the German Gegenreformation. The term was coined in the late eighteenth century by German historians as a negative concept to describe Catholic repressions and was popularised through the mid-nineteenth century by those like Leopold von Ranke.

Protestant historians have tended to speak in terms of Catholic reform as part of the Counter-Reformation, itself a response to the Reformation.

In nineteenth-century Germany, the term became part of the Kulturkampf: ‘Counter-Reformation’ was used by Protestant historians as a negative and one-dimensional concept that stressed the aspect of reaction and resistance to Protestantism and neglected that of reform within Catholicism. The term was understandably shunned by Catholic historians. Even when the Protestant historian Wilhelm Maurenbrecher introduced the term ‘Catholic Reformation’ in 1880, German historiography remained confessionally divided on the subject. The term ‘Catholic Reformation’ appealed to Catholic historians because it offered them the possibility of avoiding the term ‘Counter-Reformation’, with its problematic connotation of a mere reaction to Protestantism. But it was rejected by Protestant historians – largely because they did not want the term ‘Reformation’ to be used for anything other than the Protestant Reformation.

Catholic historians tend to emphasize them as different. The French historian Henri Daniel-Rops wrote:

The term ('counter-reformation'), however, though common, is misleading: it cannot rightly be applied, logically or chronologically, to that sudden awakening as of a startled giant, that wonderful effort of rejuvenation and reorganization, which in a space of thirty years gave to the Church an altogether new appearance. … The so-called 'counter-reformation' did not begin with the Council of Trent, long after Luther; its origins and initial achievements were much anterior to the fame of Wittenberg. It was undertaken, not by way of answering the 'reformers,' but in obedience to demands and principles that are part of the unalterable tradition of the Church and proceed from her most fundamental loyalties.

Historian Massimo Firpo distinguished between the "Counter-Reformation" and a more general "Catholic Reformation". In his view, the general "Catholic Reformation" was "centered on the care of souls ..., episcopal residence, the renewal of the clergy, together with the charitable and educational roles of the new religious orders", whereas the specific "Counter-Reformation" was "founded upon the defence of orthodoxy, the repression of dissent, the reassertion of ecclesiastical authority".

Other relevant terms that may be encountered:

- 'Pre-Tridentine': before, or the status quo ante of, the Council of Trent (such as "pre-Tridentine Mass")
- 'Tridentine': initiated at, or as a result of, the Council of Trent (1545–1563) (such as "Tridentine Mass")
- 'Post-Tridentine': sometimes a synonym for Tridentine; alternatively, some subsequent distinct reaction or development (such as "post-Tridentine Mass")
Cluniac (Monastic) and Gregorian
Mendicants
Lay Groups
Renaissances
Humanism (Catholic)
Waldensians
Hussites and Utraquists
Oratories and Societies
Protestant Reformations
English Reformations
Counter Reformation
Vatican II
│
900
│
1050
│
1200
│
1350
│
1500
│
1650
│
1800
│
1950
Second Millennium Western Mainstream Reformist Movements
- Darker colour approximates most intense period of unrest, change or impact
- Green=Catholic; Red=Protestant; Blue=Other

== Precursor Catholic Reformation ==
The Gregorian reforms of the late 11th century—intended to, e.g., reduce kingly and dynastic control of religious life and use of assets and to prevent parishes from becoming "family businesses"—flowed out from Rome, for example reaching Ireland around 35 years later with the Irish Synod of Ráth Breasail (1111); this established the episcopal system over the aristocracy-dominated monasteries in Ireland, resulting in the eventual dissolution of many monasteries in the 12th century, such as the Abbey of Kells. The reforms lead to the rise of the Canons Regular as alternatives to monks or friars. These were priests living, like monks, in perhaps-avowed communities but focused outwardly (e.g., serving parish or cathedral pastoral duties) rather than inwardly (e.g., cloistered or necessarily observing the full Liturgy of the Hours.) The reforms reached Germany in 1122 with the Concordat of Worms.

The 14th, 15th, and 16th centuries saw a spiritual revival in Europe incubated by the rise of preaching friars, the standardization of the Paris Bible, lay spiritual movements (such as the devotio moderna), the examples of nascent saints such as Catherine of Bologna, Antoninus of Florence, Rita of Cascia and Catherine of Genoa, printing, Christian humanism, an urbanized laity who could not flee the towns for monasteries, and other reasons.

A series of ecumenical councils were held with reformist agendas:

- Council of Constance (1415)
- Council of Basel (1431)-Ferrara (1438)-Florence (1449)
- Fifth Council of the Lateran (1512–1517)

The kinds of positive reforms considered were not necessarily the ones that preoccupied the Hussites (e.g., communion under both kinds and married priests) and later Protestants (e.g., indulgences and justification). Ending schism and war (especially papal war) was regarded by some prelates as the precondition for reformation.

At times, the reform talk in the councils tended to lack enough specificity to result in an effective program—except for a tendency to follow the Observantist faction of the monastic orders (that less slackness regarding external observances would aid fervour in internal piety) or to promote a top-down ("head and body") institution-centric focus which held that reform needed to start at and from the Pope, bishops, councils, princes, or canon law. There was considerable support for the evangelical counsels' ideal of poverty as a way to short-circuit careerism, though John Wycliffe's doctrine of mandatory apostolic poverty was decisively rejected at the Council of Constance.

Issues such as papal nepotism and the wealth, diocese-absenteeism, and pre-occupation with secular power of important bishops were recognized as perennial and scandalous problems. These resisted serious reform (by successive popes and councils with those bishops, unable to compromise their own interests) for centuries, causing friction as radical reformers periodically arose in response, as with Savonarola.

In the half-century before the reformation, the phenomenon of bishops closing down decadent monasteries or convents had become more common, as had programs to educate parish priests. In the half-century before the Council of Trent, various evangelical Catholic leaders had experimented with reforms that came to be associated with Protestants: for example, Guillaume Briçonnet (bishop of Meaux) in Paris, with his former teacher Jacques Lefèvre d’Etaples, had statues other than Christ removed from his churches (though not destroyed), replaced the Hail Mary with the Pater Noster prayer, and made available vernacular French versions of the Gospels and Epistles.

Conservative and reforming parties still survived within the Catholic Church even as the Protestant Reformations spread. Protestants decisively broke from the Catholic Church in the 1520s. The two distinct dogmatic positions within the Catholic Church solidified in the 1560s.

=== Priests and religious orders ===
The regular orders made their first attempts at reform in the 14th century. The 'Benedictine Bull' of 1336 reformed the Benedictines and Cistercians. In 1523, the Camaldolese Hermits of Monte Corona were recognized as a separate congregation of monks.

In 1435, Francis of Paola founded the Poor Hermits of Saint Francis of Assisi, who became the Minim Friars. In 1526, Matteo de Bascio suggested reforming the Franciscan rule of life to its original purity, giving birth to the Capuchins, recognized by the pope in 1619. This order was well known to the laity and played an important role in public preaching.

To respond to the new needs of evangelism, clergy formed into religious congregations, taking special vows but with no obligation to assist in a monastery's religious offices. These regular clergy taught, preached and took confession but were under a bishop's direct authority and not linked to a specific parish or area like a vicar or canon. In Italy, the first congregation of regular clergy was the Theatines founded in 1524 by Gaetano and Cardinal Gian Caraffa. This was followed by the Somaschi Fathers in 1528, the Barnabites in 1530, the Ursulines in 1535, the Jesuits, canonically recognised in 1540, the Clerics Regular of the Mother of God of Lucca in 1583, the Camillians in 1584, the Adorno Fathers in 1588, and finally the Piarists in 1621.

At the end of the 1400s, a reform movement inspired by St Catherine of Genoa's hospital ministry started spreading: in Rome, starting 1514, the Oratory of Divine Love attracted an aristocratic membership of priests and laymen to perform anonymous acts of charity and to discuss reform; the members subsequently became the key players in the church handling the Reformation. In 1548, then-layman Philip Neri founded a Confraternity of the Most Holy Trinity of Pilgrims and Convalescents: this developed into the relatively-free religious community the Oratorians, who were given their constitutions in 1564 and recognized as a religious order by the pope in 1575. They used music and singing to attract the faithful.

== Councils and documents ==
=== Confutatio Augustana ===
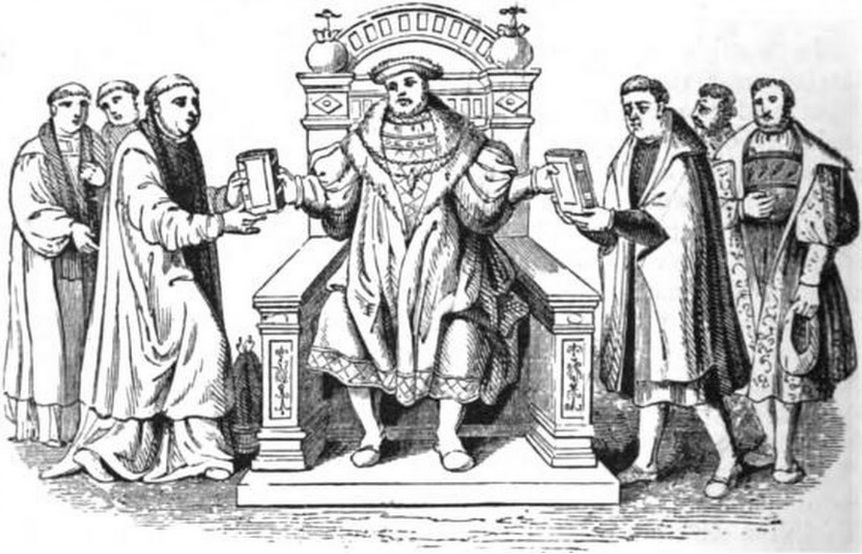
Confutatio Augustana (left) and Confessio Augustana (right) being presented to Charles V

The 1530 Confutatio Augustana was the Catholic response to the Lutheran Augsburg Confession.

=== Council of Trent ===
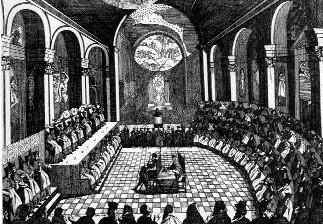
A session of the Council of Trent, from an engraving

Pope Paul III (1534–1549) is considered the first pope of the Counter-Reformation, and he also initiated the Council of Trent (1545–1563), tasked with institutional reform, addressing contentious issues such as corrupt bishops and priests, the sale of indulgences, and other financial abuses.

The council upheld the basic structure of the medieval church, its sacramental system, religious orders, and doctrine. It recommended that the form of Mass should be standardised, and this took place in 1570, when Pope Pius V made the Tridentine Mass obligatory. It rejected all compromise with Protestants, restating basic tenets of the Catholic Faith. The council upheld salvation appropriated by grace through faith and works of that faith (not just by faith, as the Protestants insisted) because "faith without works is dead", as the Epistle of James states (2:22–26).

Transubstantiation, according to which the consecrated bread and wine are held to have been transformed really and substantially into the body, blood, soul and divinity of Christ, was also reaffirmed, as were the traditional seven sacraments of the Catholic Church. Other practices that drew the ire of Protestant reformers, such as pilgrimages, the veneration of saints and relics, the use of venerable images and statuary, and the veneration of the Virgin Mary were strongly reaffirmed as spiritually commendable practices.

The council, in the Canon of Trent, officially accepted the Vulgate listing of the Old Testament Bible, which included the deuterocanonical works (called apocrypha by Protestants) on a par with the 39 books found in the Masoretic Text. This reaffirmed the previous Council of Rome (382), Synod of Carthage (397), and the Council of Basel/Ferrara/Florence (1442), which had each affirmed the Deuterocanon as scripture. (Note: Eastern Orthodox churches, following the Septuagint, generally include the deuterocanonical works with even a few additional items not found in Catholic Bibles, but they consider them of secondary authority and not on the same level as the other scriptures. The Church of England may use Bibles that place the deuterocanonical works between the protocanonical Old Testament and the New, but not interspersed among the other Old Testament books as in Catholic Bibles.) The council also commissioned the Roman Catechism, which served as authoritative Church teaching until the Catechism of the Catholic Church (1992).

While the traditional fundamentals of the Church were reaffirmed, there were noticeable changes to answer complaints that the Counter-Reformers were, tacitly, willing to admit were legitimate. Among the conditions to be corrected by Catholic reformers was the growing divide between the clerics and the laity; many members of the clergy in the rural parishes had been poorly educated. Often, these rural priests did not know Latin and lacked opportunities for proper theological training. Addressing the education of priests had been a fundamental focus of the humanist reformers in the past.

Parish priests were to be better educated in matters of theology and apologetics, while Papal authorities sought to educate the faithful about the meaning, nature and value of art and liturgy, particularly in monastic churches (Protestants had criticised them as "distracting"). Handbooks became more common, describing how to be good priests and confessors, and confessees.

Thus, the Council of Trent attempted to improve the discipline and administration of the Church. The worldly excesses of the secular Renaissance Church, epitomized by the era of Alexander VI (1492–1503), intensified during the Reformation under Pope Leo X (1513–1521), whose campaign to raise funds for the construction of Saint Peter's Basilica by supporting use of indulgences served as a key impetus for Martin Luther's 95 Theses. The Catholic Church responded to these problems by a vigorous campaign of reform, inspired by earlier Catholic reform movements: humanism, devotionalism, and observantism.

The council, by virtue of its actions, repudiated the pluralism of the secular Renaissance that had previously plagued the Church: the organization of religious institutions was tightened, discipline was improved, and the parish was emphasized. The appointment of bishops for political reasons was no longer tolerated. In the past, the large landholdings forced many bishops to be "absent bishops" who at times were property managers trained in administration. Thus, the Council of Trent combated "absenteeism", which was the practice of bishops living in Rome or on landed estates rather than in their dioceses. The Council of Trent gave bishops greater power to supervise all aspects of religious life. Zealous prelates, such as Milan's Archbishop Carlo Borromeo (1538–1584), later canonized as a saint, set an example by visiting the remotest parishes and instilling high standards.

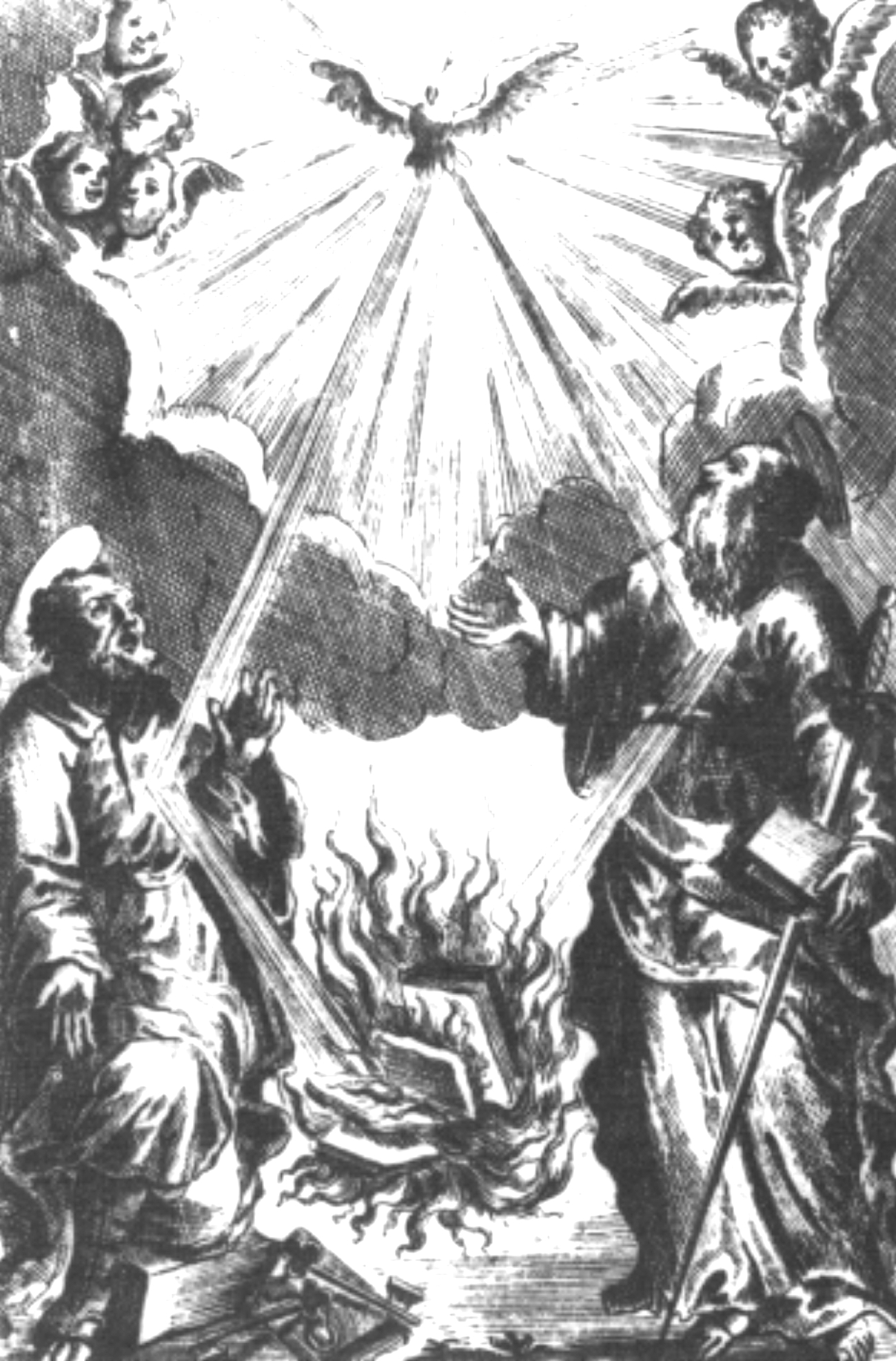
This 1711 illustration for the Index Librorum Prohibitorum depicts the Holy Ghost supplying the book burning fire.

=== Index Librorum Prohibitorum ===
The 1559–1967 Index Librorum Prohibitorum was a directory of prohibited books which was updated twenty times during the next four centuries as books were added or removed from the list by the Sacred Congregation of the Index. It was divided into three classes. The first class listed heretical writers, the second class listed heretical works, and the third class listed forbidden writings which were published without the name of the author. The Index was finally suspended on 29 March 1967.

=== Roman Catechism ===
The 1566 Roman Catechism provided material in Latin to help the clergy catechize in the vernacular.

=== Nova ordinantia ecclesiastica ===
The 1575 Nova ordinantia ecclesiastica was an addendum to the Liturgia Svecanæ Ecclesiæ catholicæ & orthodoxæ conformia, also called the "Red Book". This launched the Liturgical Struggle, which pitted John III of Sweden against his younger brother Charles. During this time, Jesuit Laurentius Nicolai came to lead the Collegium regium Stockholmense. This theatre of the Counter-Reformation was called the Missio Suetica.

=== Defensio Tridentinæ fidei ===
The 1578 Defensio Tridentinæ fidei was the Catholic response to the Examination of the Council of Trent.

=== Unigenitus ===
The 1713 papal bull Unigenitus condemned 101 propositions of the French Jansenist theologian Pasquier Quesnel (1634–1719). Jansenism was a movement within Catholicism in France and the Spanish Netherlands that was criticized for being crypto-Calvinist, denying that Christ died for all, promoting that Holy Communion should be received very infrequently, and more. After Jansenist propositions were condemned it led to the development of the Old Catholic Church of the Netherlands.

== Politics and wars ==
=== The Netherlands ===
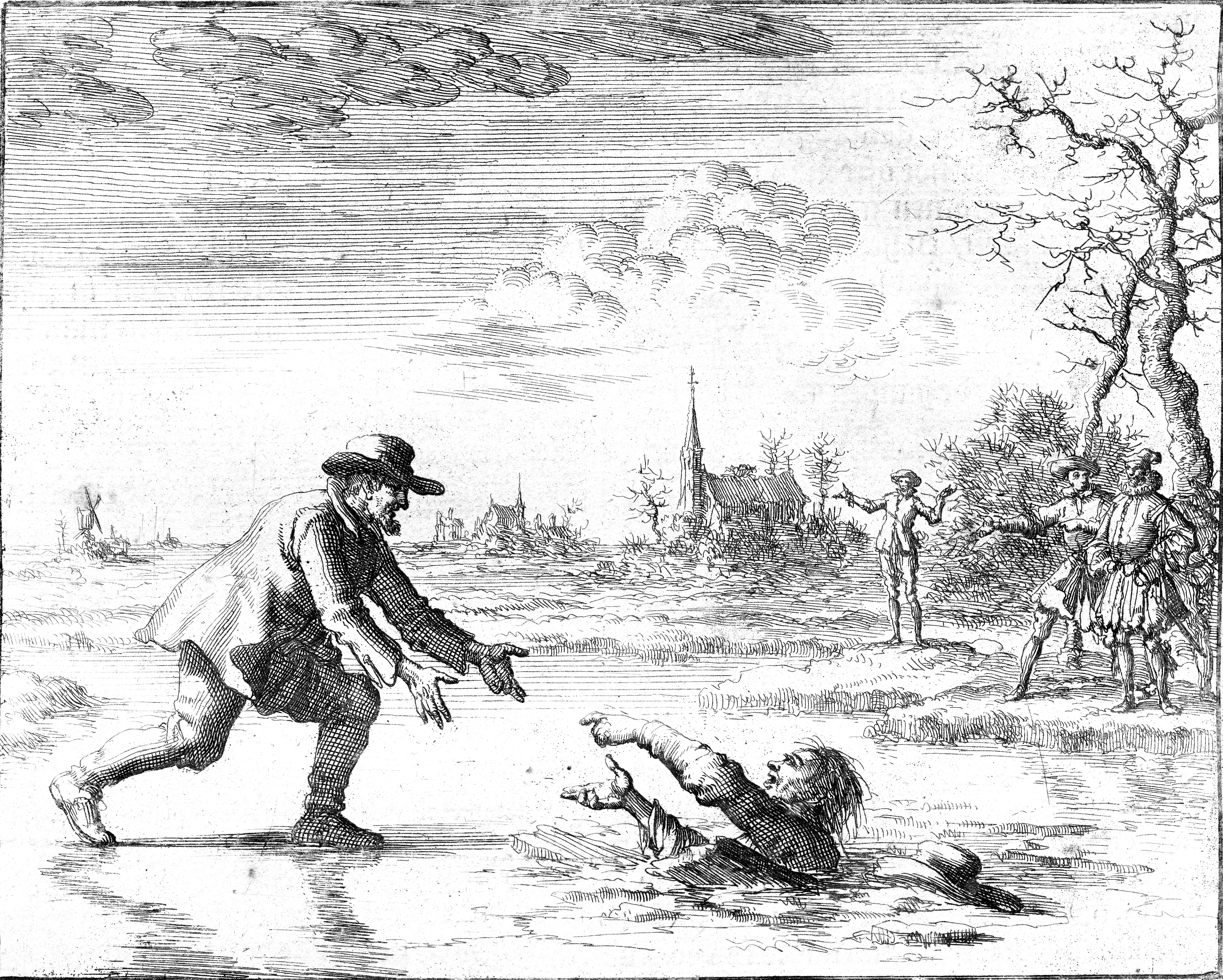
Anabaptist Dirk Willems rescues his pursuer and is subsequently burned at the stake in 1569.

When the Calvinists took control of various parts of the Netherlands in the Dutch Revolt, the Catholics led by Philip II of Spain fought back. The king sent in Alexander Farnese as Governor-General of the Spanish Netherlands from 1578 to 1592.

Farnese led a successful campaign 1578–1592 against the Dutch Revolt, in which he captured the main cities in the south (the future Belgium) and returned them to the control of Catholic Spain. He took advantage of the divisions in the ranks of his opponents between the Dutch-speaking Flemish and the French-speaking Walloons, using persuasion to take advantage of the divisions and foment the growing discord. By doing so he was able to bring back the Walloon provinces to an allegiance to the king. By the treaty of Arras in 1579, he secured the support of the 'Malcontents', as the Catholic nobles of the south were styled.

The seven northern provinces as well as the County of Flanders and Duchy of Brabant, controlled by Calvinists, responded with the Union of Utrecht, where they resolved to stick together to fight Spain. Farnese secured his base in Hainaut and Artois, then moved against Brabant and Flanders. City after city fell: Tournai, Maastricht, Breda, Bruges and Ghent opened their gates.

Farnese finally laid siege to the great seaport of Antwerp. The town was open to the sea, strongly fortified, and well defended under the leadership of Marnix van St. Aldegonde. Farnese cut off all access to the sea by constructing a bridge of boats across the Scheldt. Antwerp surrendered in 1585 as 60,000 citizens (60 per cent of the pre-siege population) fled north. All of the Southern Netherlands was once more under Spanish control.

In a war composed mostly of sieges rather than battles, he proved his mettle. His strategy was to offer generous terms for surrender: there would be no massacres or looting; historic urban privileges were retained; there was a full pardon and amnesty; return to the Catholic Church would be gradual.

Meanwhile, Catholic refugees from the north regrouped in Cologne and Douai and developed a more militant, Tridentine identity. They became the mobilizing forces of a popular Counter-Reformation in the south, thereby facilitating the eventual emergence of the state of Belgium.

=== Germany ===
The Augsburg Interim was a period where Counter-Reformation measures were exacted upon defeated Protestant populations following the Schmalkaldic War.

During the centuries of Counter-Reformation, new towns, collectively termed Exulantenstädte (plural), were founded especially as homes for refugees fleeing the Counter-Reformation. Supporters of the Unity of the Brethren settled in parts of Silesia and Poland. Protestants from the County of Flanders often fled to the Lower Rhine region and northern Germany. French Huguenots crossed the Rhineland to Central Germany. Most towns were named either after the ruler who established them or as expressions of gratitude, e.g. Freudenstadt ("Joy Town"), Glückstadt ("Happy Town").

A list of Exulantenstädte:

- Altona, Hamburg
- Bad Karlshafen
- Freudenstadt
- Friedrichsdorf
- Glückstadt
- Hanau
- Johanngeorgenstadt
- Krefeld
- Neu-Isenburg
- Neusalza-Spremberg

==== Cologne ====
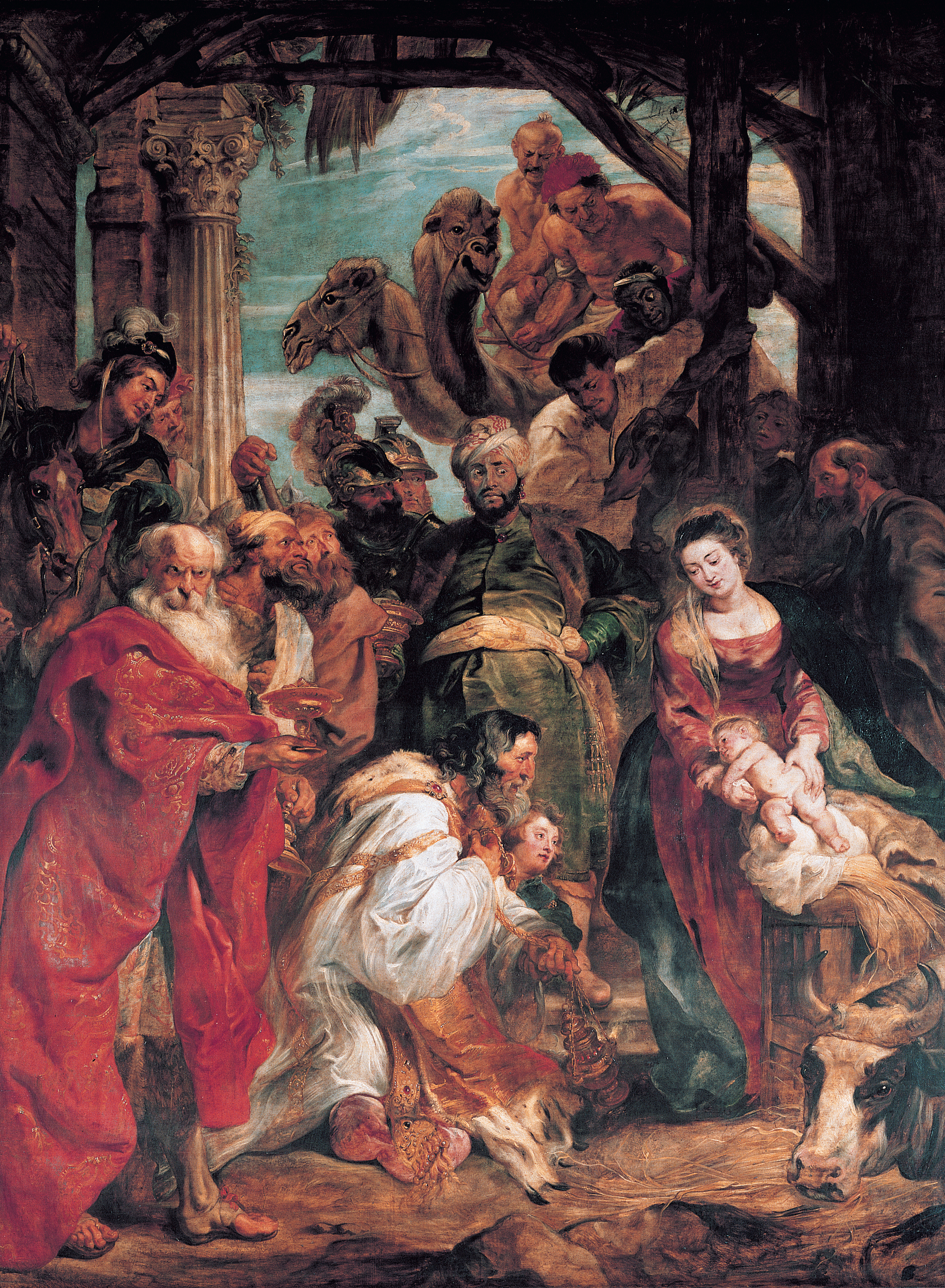
Peter Paul Rubens was the great Flemish artist of the Counter-Reformation. He painted Adoration of the Magi in 1624.

The Cologne War (1583–1589) was a conflict between Protestant and Catholic factions that devastated the Electorate of Cologne. After Archbishop Gebhard Truchsess von Waldburg, the prince-elector ruling the area, converted to Protestantism, Catholics elected another archbishop, Ernst of Bavaria, and successfully defeated Gebhard and his allies.

=== Bohemia and Austria ===
In the Habsburg hereditary lands, which had become predominantly Protestant except for Tyrol, the Counter-Reformation began with Emperor Rudolf II, who began suppressing Protestant activity in 1576. However, the focal point of the conflict shifted to the Bohemian lands, where approximately 85% of the population was Protestant and deeply resented the rule of a Catholic dynasty — a dynasty that, moreover, systematically favored aristocrats from the Catholic minority for high-ranking positions within the realm. Although Emperor Maximilian II had verbally promised to uphold the principles of the Protestant Bohemian Confession (1575), and Rudolf II had been compelled by circumstances to sign the Letter of Majesty for Bohemia and Silesia (1609) – which established the principle of religious tolerance – the situation was subsequently exacerbated by the ruling house after 1617. King Ferdinand II failed to adhere to the terms of the Letter of Majesty, ultimately leading to the outbreak of the Bohemian Revolt (1618–1620). Defeated, the Protestant nobility, clergy and burghers of Bohemia and Austria were expelled from the country or forced to convert to Catholicism. In case of Bohemia (including Moravia) there also occurred the most extensive expropriation in Europe at the time: the majority of the Protestant nobility who refused to renounce their faith lost their property to the House of Habsburg, which subsequently sold it off – well below its value – or gifted it to its supporters among the foreign nobility (primarily German, Spanish, and Italian). In the periods that followed, this had a significant impact on the decline of Czech culture and language. Among these exiles from Austrian lands were important German poets such as Sigmund von Birken, Catharina Regina von Greiffenberg, and Johann Wilhelm von Stubenberg (this influenced the development of German Baroque literature, especially around Regensburg and Nuremberg) while well-known Bohemian exiles included e.g. Comenius, Paul Stránský of Zápy, Augustine Herman or Wenceslas Hollar. Some remnants of poor serfs lived as crypto-Protestants, especially in borderland regions – from those regions later (in the first quarter of the 18th c.) came into Saxony first adherents of the Moravian Church.

After the Silesian Wars (1740–1748) those crypto-Protestants in Bohemia took the opportunity to flee to Silesia (or even Brandenburg) which under the rule of the Prussian kings had once again become Protestant. The Salzburg Protestants were exiled in the 18th century, especially to Prussia. The Transylvanian Landlers were deported to the eastern part of the Habsburg domain.

As heir to the throne, Joseph II spoke vehemently to his mother, Maria Theresa, in 1777 against the expulsion of Protestants from Moravia, calling her choices "unjust, impious, impossible, harmful and ridiculous." His 1781 Patent of Toleration can be regarded as the end of the political Counter-Reformation, although there were still smaller expulsions against Protestants (such as the Zillertal expulsion).

In 1966, Archbishop of Salzburg Andreas Rohracher expressed regret about the expulsions.

=== France ===
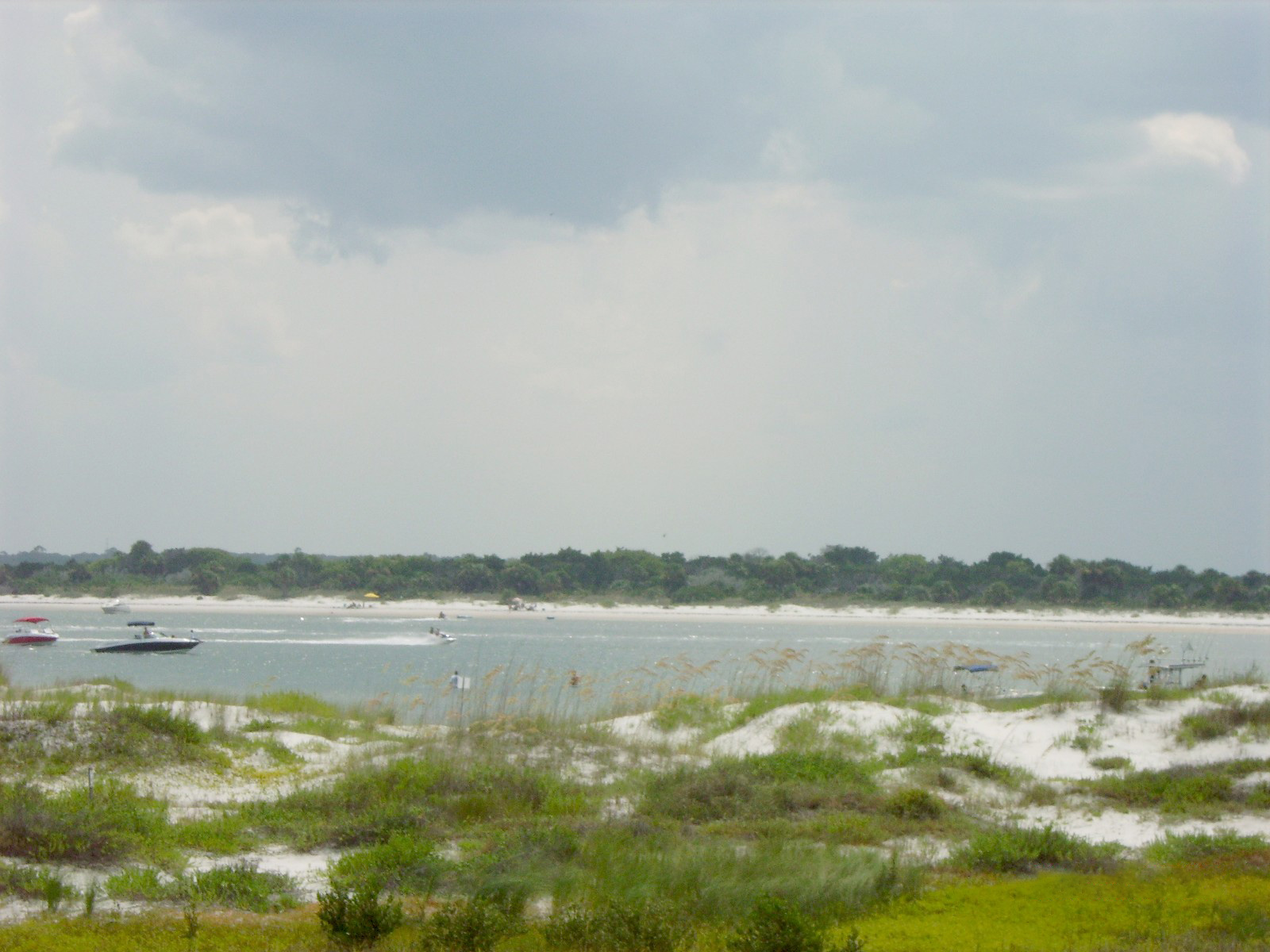
Matanzas Inlet, Florida, where the survivors were killed

In France, from 1562 Catholics and Huguenots (Reformed Protestants) fought a series of wars, resulting in millions of deaths until the Edict of Nantes brought religious peace in 1598. It affirmed Catholicism as the state religion but granted considerable toleration to Protestants, as well as political and military privileges. The latter would be lost at the Peace of Alès of 1629, but the religious toleration lasted until the reign of Louis XIV, who resumed persecution of Protestants and finally abolished their right to worship with the Edict of Fontainebleau in 1685.

In 1565, several hundred Huguenot shipwreck survivors surrendered to the Spanish authorities in Florida, presuming they would be treated fairly. The small number of Catholics among the shipwrecked were spared but the rest were all executed for heresy, with active clerical participation.

=== Eastern Rites ===
==== Ukraine ====
The effects of the Council of Trent and the Counter-Reformation also paved the way for Ruthenian Orthodox Christians to return to full communion with the Catholic Church while preserving their Byzantine tradition. Pope Clement VIII received the Ruthenian bishops into full communion on February 7, 1596. Under the treaty of the Union of Brest, Rome recognized the Ruthenians' continued practice of Byzantine liturgical tradition, married clergy, and consecration of bishops from within the Ruthenian Christian tradition. Moreover, the treaty specifically exempts Ruthenians from using a Creed with the Filioque clause as a condition for reconciliation, and the Ruthenians agree not to debate Purgatory.

== Outcomes ==
Scholars have made a distinction between the political issue of a state's established religion remaining Catholic and the advance of religious reforms within Catholicism: Anglican historian G.E. Duffield noted, "RC reform ... does not easily fit into geographical patterns as Protestant reform does."

=== Areas affected ===
The Counter-Reformation succeeded in drastically diminishing Protestantism in Lithuania, Poland, France, Italy, and the vast lands controlled by the Habsburgs including Austria, southern Germany, Bohemia (now in the Czech Republic), the Spanish Netherlands (now Belgium and surrounds), Croatia, and Slovenia. It did not succeed as completely in Hungary, where a sizeable Protestant minority remains to this day, although Catholics still are the largest Christian denomination.

Peak of the Reformation & beginning of the Counter-Reformation (1545–1620)

End of the Reformation & Counter-Reformation (1648)

=== Religious orders ===
New religious orders were a fundamental part of the reforms. Orders such as the Capuchins, Discalced Carmelites, Discalced Augustinians and Augustinian Recollects, Cistercian Feuillants, Angelines and Ursulines, Theatines, Barnabites, and the Congregation of the Oratory of Saint Philip Neri attempted either to be less decadent or to engage in charitable service, and set examples of Catholic renewal particularly in Southern Europe. The Jesuits especially worked in rural parishes. Most of these had been founded earlier in the 15th Century, as part of Catholic reforms before the Council of Trent.

The Theatines undertook checking the spread of heresy and contributed to a regeneration of the clergy. The Capuchins, an offshoot of the Franciscan order notable for their preaching and for their care for the poor and the sick, grew rapidly. Capuchin-founded confraternities took special interest in the poor and lived austerely. Members of orders active in overseas missionary expansion expressed the view that the rural parishes often needed Christianizing as much as the heathens of Asia and the Americas.

The Ursulines focused on the special task of educating girls, the first order of women to be dedicated to that goal. Devotion to the traditional works of mercy exemplified the Catholic Reformation's reaffirmation of the importance of both faith and works and salvation through God's grace and repudiation of the maxim sola fide emphasized by Protestants sects. Not only did they make the Church more effective, but they also reaffirmed fundamental premises of the medieval Church.

The Jesuits were the most effective of the new Catholic orders. An heir to the devotional, observantine, and legalist traditions, the Jesuits organized along military lines. The worldliness of the Renaissance Church had no part in their new order. Loyola's masterwork Spiritual Exercises showed the emphasis of handbooks characteristic of Catholic reformers before the Reformations, reminiscent of devotionalism.

Jesuits participated in the expansion of the Church in the Americas and Asia, by their missionary activity. Loyola's biography contributed to an emphasis on popular piety that had waned under political popes such as Alexander VI and Leo X. After recovering from a serious wound, he took a vow to "serve only God and the Roman pontiff, His vicar on Earth." The emphasis on the Pope is a reaffirmation of the medieval papalism, while the Council of Trent defeated conciliarism, the belief that general councils of the Church collectively were God's representative on Earth rather than the Pope. Taking the Pope as an absolute leader, the Jesuits contributed to the Counter-Reformation Church along a line harmonized with Rome.

=== Devotion and mysticism ===
The Battle of Lepanto
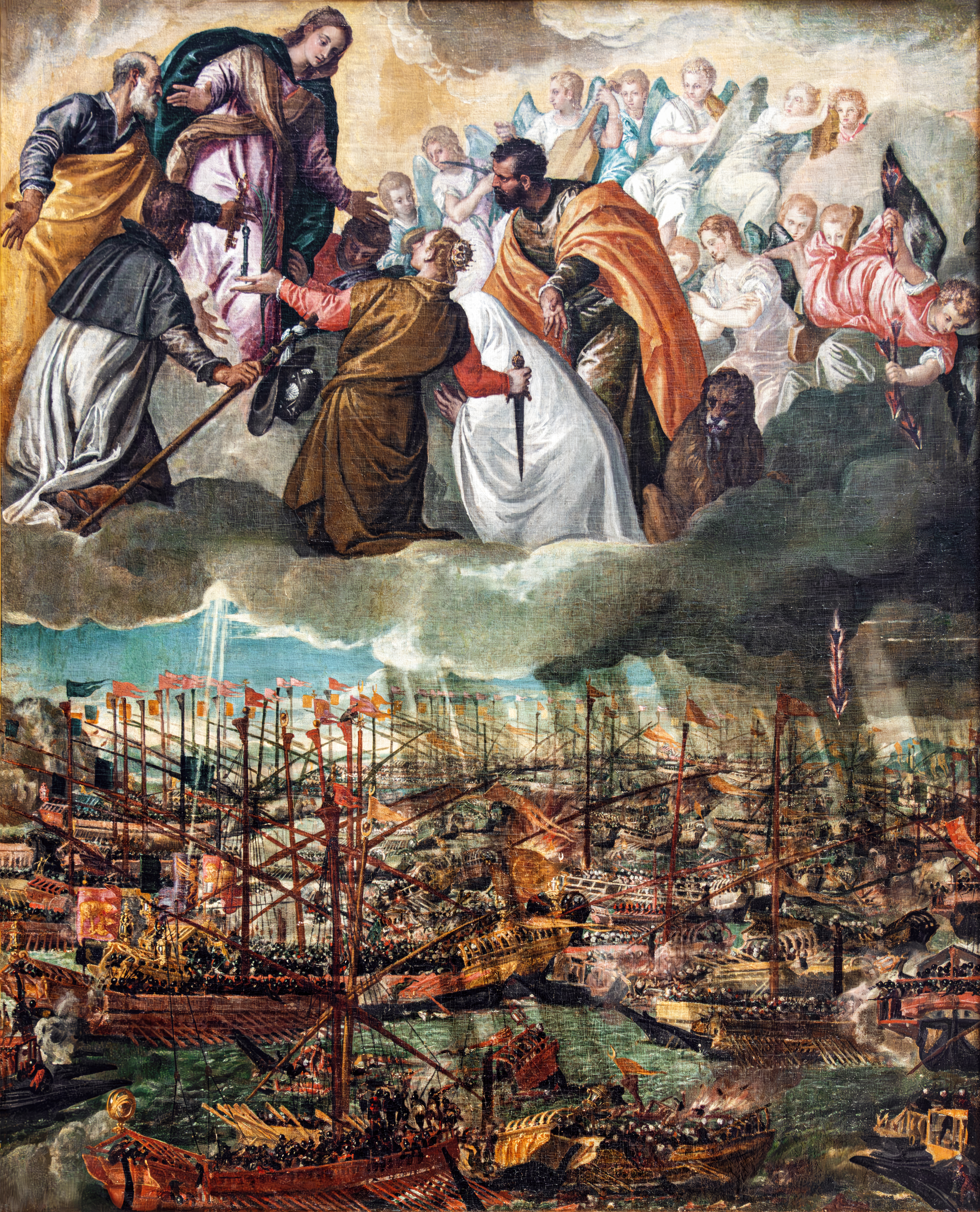
- Artist: Paolo Veronese
- Year: 1571
- Medium: Oil on canvas
- Dimensions: 169 cm × 137 cm (67 in × 54 in)
- Location: Gallerie dell'Accademia, Venice, Italy

The Catholic Reformation was not only a political and Church policy oriented movement, but it also included major figures such as Catherine of Genoa, Ignatius of Loyola, Teresa of Ávila, John of the Cross, Francis de Sales, and Philip Neri, who added to the spirituality of the Catholic Church. Teresa of Avila and John of the Cross were Spanish mystics and reformers of the Carmelite Order, whose ministry focused on interior conversion to Christ, the deepening of prayer, and commitment to God's will. Teresa was given the task of developing and writing about the way to perfection in her love and unity with Christ. Thomas Merton called John of the Cross the greatest of all mystical theologians.

The Virgin Mary played an increasingly central role in Catholic devotions. The victory at the Battle of Lepanto in 1571 was accredited to the Virgin Mary and signified the beginning of a strong resurgence of Marian devotions. During and after the Catholic Reformation, Marian piety experienced unforeseen growth with over 500 pages of mariological writings during the 17th century alone. The Jesuit Francisco Suárez was the first theologian to use the Thomist method on Marian theology. Other well-known contributors to Marian spirituality are Saints Lawrence of Brindisi, Robert Bellarmine, and Francis de Sales.

The sacrament of penance was transformed from a social to a personal experience; that is, from a public community act to a private confession. It now took place in private in a confessional. It was a change in its emphasis from reconciliation with the Church to reconciliation directly with God and from emphasis on social sins of hostility to private sins (called "the secret sins of the heart").

=== Baroque art ===
The Catholic Church was a leading arts patron across much of Europe. The goal of much art in the Counter-Reformation, especially in the Rome of Bernini and the Flanders of Peter Paul Rubens, was to restore Catholicism's predominance and centrality. This was one of the drivers of the Baroque style that emerged across Europe in the late sixteenth century. In areas where Catholicism predominated, architecture and painting, and to a lesser extent music, reflected Counter-Reformation goals.

The Council of Trent proclaimed that architecture, painting and sculpture had a role in conveying Catholic theology. Any work that might arouse "carnal desire" was inadmissible in churches, while any depiction of Christ's suffering and explicit agony was desirable and proper. In an era when some Protestant reformers were destroying images of saints and whitewashing walls, Catholic reformers reaffirmed the importance of art, with special encouragement given to images of the Virgin Mary.

==== Decrees on art ====
The Last Judgment
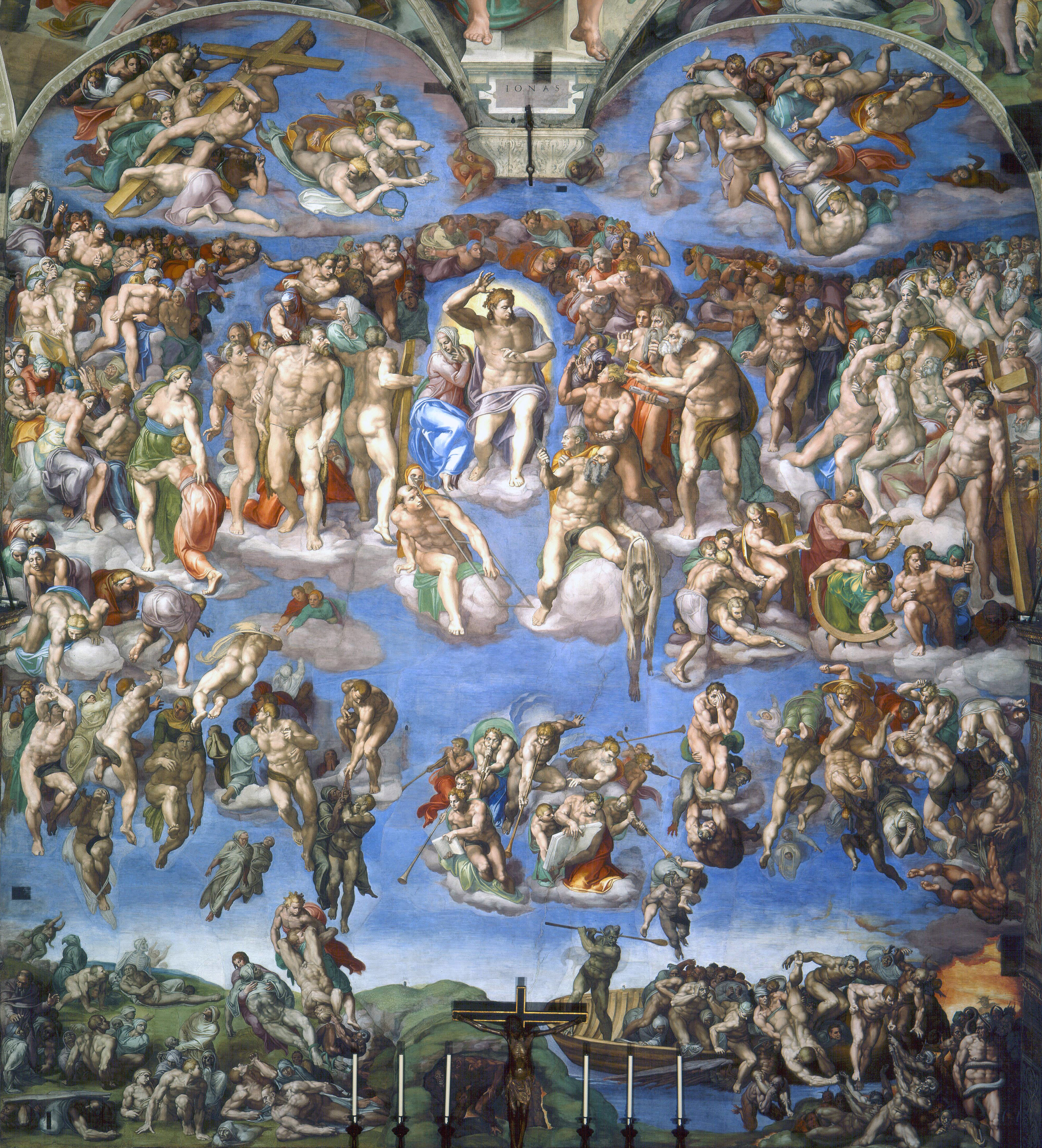
- Artist: Michelangelo
- Year: 1537–1541
- Type: Fresco
- Dimensions: 1370 cm × 1200 cm (539.3 in × 472.4 in)
- Location: Sistine Chapel, Vatican City

The Last Judgment, a fresco in the Sistine Chapel by Michelangelo (1534–1541), came under persistent attack in the Counter-Reformation for, among other things, nudity (later painted over for several centuries), not showing Christ seated or bearded, and including the pagan figure of Charon. Italian painting after 1520, with the notable exception of the art of Venice, developed into Mannerism, a highly sophisticated style striving for effect, that concerned many Churchmen as lacking appeal for the mass of the population. Church pressure to restrain religious imagery affected art from the 1530s and resulted in the decrees of the final session of the Council of Trent in 1563 including short and rather inexplicit passages concerning religious images, which were to have great impact on the development of Catholic art. Previous Catholic councils had rarely felt the need to pronounce on these matters, unlike Orthodox ones which have often ruled on specific types of images.

The decree confirmed the traditional doctrine that images only represented the person depicted, and that veneration to them was paid to the person, not the image, and further instructed that:

... every superstition shall be removed ... all lasciviousness be avoided; in such wise that figures shall not be painted or adorned with a beauty exciting to lust ... there be nothing seen that is disorderly, or that is unbecomingly or confusedly arranged, nothing that is profane, nothing indecorous, seeing that holiness becometh the house of God. And that these things may be the more faithfully observed, the holy Synod ordains, that no one be allowed to place, or cause to be placed, any unusual image, in any place, or church, howsoever exempted, except that image have been approved of by the bishop ...

Ten years after the decree Paolo Veronese was summoned by the Holy Office to explain why his Last Supper, a huge canvas for the refectory of a monastery, contained, in the words of the Holy Office: "buffoons, drunken Germans, dwarfs and other such scurrilities" as well as extravagant costumes and settings, in what is indeed a fantasy version of a Venetian patrician feast. Veronese was told that he must change his painting within a three-month period. He just changed the title to The Feast in the House of Levi, still an episode from the Gospels, but a less doctrinally central one, and no more was said.

The number of such decorative treatments of religious subjects declined sharply, as did "unbecomingly or confusedly arranged" Mannerist pieces, as a number of books, notably by the Flemish theologian Molanus, Charles Borromeo and Cardinal Gabriele Paleotti, and instructions by local bishops, amplified the decrees, often going into minute detail on what was acceptable. Much traditional iconography considered without adequate scriptural foundation was in effect prohibited, as was any inclusion of classical pagan elements in religious art, and almost all nudity, including that of the infant Jesus.

According to the great medievalist Émile Mâle, this was "the death of medieval art", but it paled in contrast to the Iconclasm present in some Protestant circles and did not apply to secular paintings. Some Counter Reformation painters and sculptors include Titian, Tintoretto, Federico Barocci, Scipione Pulzone, El Greco, Peter Paul Rubens, Guido Reni, Anthony van Dyck, Bernini, Zurbarán, Rembrandt and Bartolomé Esteban Murillo.

=== Church music ===
The Council of Trent is believed to be the apex of the Counter-Reformation's influence on Church music in the 16th century. However, the council's pronouncements on music were not the first attempt at reform. The Catholic Church had spoken out against a perceived abuse of music used in the Mass before the Council of Trent ever convened to discuss music in 1562. The manipulation of the Creed and using non-liturgical songs was addressed in 1503, and secular singing and the intelligibility of the text in the delivery of psalmody in 1492. The delegates at the council were just a link in the long chain of Church clergy who had pushed for a reform of the musical liturgy reaching back as far as 1322.

Fueling the cry for reform from many ecclesial figures was the compositional technique popular in the 15th and 16th centuries of using musical material and even the accompanying texts from other compositions such as motets, madrigals, and chansons. Several voices singing different texts in different languages made any of the text difficult to distinguish from the mixture of words and notes. The parody mass would then contain melodies (usually the tenor line) and words from songs that could have been, and often were, on sensual subjects. The musical liturgy of the Church was being more and more influenced by secular tunes and styles. The Council of Paris, which met in 1528, as well as the Council of Trent were making attempts to restore the sense of sacredness to the Church setting and what was appropriate for the Mass. The councils were responding to issues of their day.

One of the most austere moves at reform came late in 1562 when, perhaps instructed by some legates, Egidio Foscarari (bishop of Modena) and Gabriele Paleotti (archbishop of Bologna) began work on reforming religious orders and their practices involving the liturgy in their dioceses. Paleotti's reforms for convents of nuns allowed only the use of an organ, prohibited professional musicians, and banished polyphonic singing; this was much more strict than the Trent council's eventual edicts or even those devised for the Palestrina legend.

==== Reforms during the 22nd session ====
The Council of Trent met sporadically from December 13, 1545, to December 4, 1563, to reform many parts of the Catholic Church.

The 22nd session required that secular elements be kept out of Mass music, keeping polyphony implicitly allowed.

[Bishops] shall also banish from the churches all such music which, whether by the organ or in the singing, contains things that are lascivious or impure;

— "Decree Concerning The Things To Be Observed And Avoided In The Celebration Of Mass", Chapter IX, Session 22, Council of Trent, 1562

==== Proposed removal of polyphony ====
The issue of textual intelligibility did not make its way into the final edicts of the 22nd session but were only featured in preliminary debates. However Archbishop Paleotti, in his Acts (the minutes of the Council), attempted to bring to equal importance the issues of intelligibility.

The idea that the council called to remove all polyphony from the Church is widespread, but there is no documentary evidence to support that claim. It is possible, however, that some of the Fathers had proposed such a measure. The Council of Trent did not focus on the style of music but on attitudes of worship and reverence during the Mass.

More severe measures had been submitted for consideration, as proposed Canon 8 of "Abuses in the Sacrifice of the Mass" during a meeting of the council on September 10, 1562. The proposed Canon 8 states that "Since the sacred mysteries should be celebrated with utmost reverence, with both deepest feeling toward God alone, and with external worship that is truly suitable and becoming, so that others may be filled with devotion and called to religion: ... Everything should be regulated so that the Masses, whether they be celebrated with the plain voice or in song, with everything clearly and quickly executed, may reach the ears of the hearers and quietly penetrate their hearts. In those Masses where measured music and organ are customary, nothing profane should be intermingled, but only hymns and divine praises. If something from the divine service is sung with the organ while the service proceeds, let if first be recited in a simple, clear voice, lest the reading of the sacred words be imperceptible. But the entire manner of singing in musical modes should be calculated not to afford vain delight to the ear, but so that the words may be comprehensible to all; and thus may the hearts of the listeners be caught up into the desire for celestial harmonies and contemplation of the joys of the blessed."

The emperor Ferdinand I, Holy Roman Emperor has been attributed to be the "saviour of Church music" because he said polyphony ought not to be driven out of the Church. But Ferdinand was most likely an alarmist and read into the council the possibility of a total ban on polyphony.

The Canon 8 text is often quoted as the Council of Trent's decree on Church music, but that is a glaring misunderstanding of the canon; it was only a proposed decree. In fact, the delegates at the council never officially accepted canon 8 in its popular form but bishops of Granada, Coimbra, and Segovia pushed for the long statement about music to be attenuated and many other prelates of the council joined enthusiastically.

===== Saviour-Legend =====
The crises regarding polyphony and intelligibility of the text and the threat that polyphony was to be removed completely, which was assumed to be coming from the council, has a very dramatic legend of resolution. The legend goes that Giovanni Pierluigi da Palestrina (c. 1525/26–1594), a Church musician and choirmaster in Rome, wrote a Mass for the council delegates in order to demonstrate that a polyphonic composition could set the text in such a way that the words could be clearly understood and that was still pleasing to the ear. Palestrina's Missa Papae Marcelli (Mass for Pope Marcellus) was performed before the council and received such a welcoming reception among the delegates that they completely changed their minds and allowed polyphony to stay in use in the musical liturgy. Therefore, Palestrina came to be named the "saviour of Church polyphony". This legend, though unfounded, has long been a mainstay of histories of music. The saviour-myth was first spread by an account by Aggazzari and Banchieri in 1609 who said that Pope Marcellus was trying to replace all polyphony with plainsong. Palestrina's "Missa Papae Marcelli" was indeed performed for the Pope in 1564, after the 22nd session, while reforms were being considered for the Sistine Choir.

The Pope Marcellus Mass, in short, was not important in its own day and did not help save Church polyphony. What is undeniable is that despite any solid evidence of his influence during or after the Council of Trent, no figure is more qualified to represent the cause of polyphony in the Mass than Palestrina. Pope Pius IV upon hearing Palestrina's music would make Palestrina, by Papal Brief, the model for future generations of Catholic composers of sacred music.

==== Reforms following the Council of Trent ====
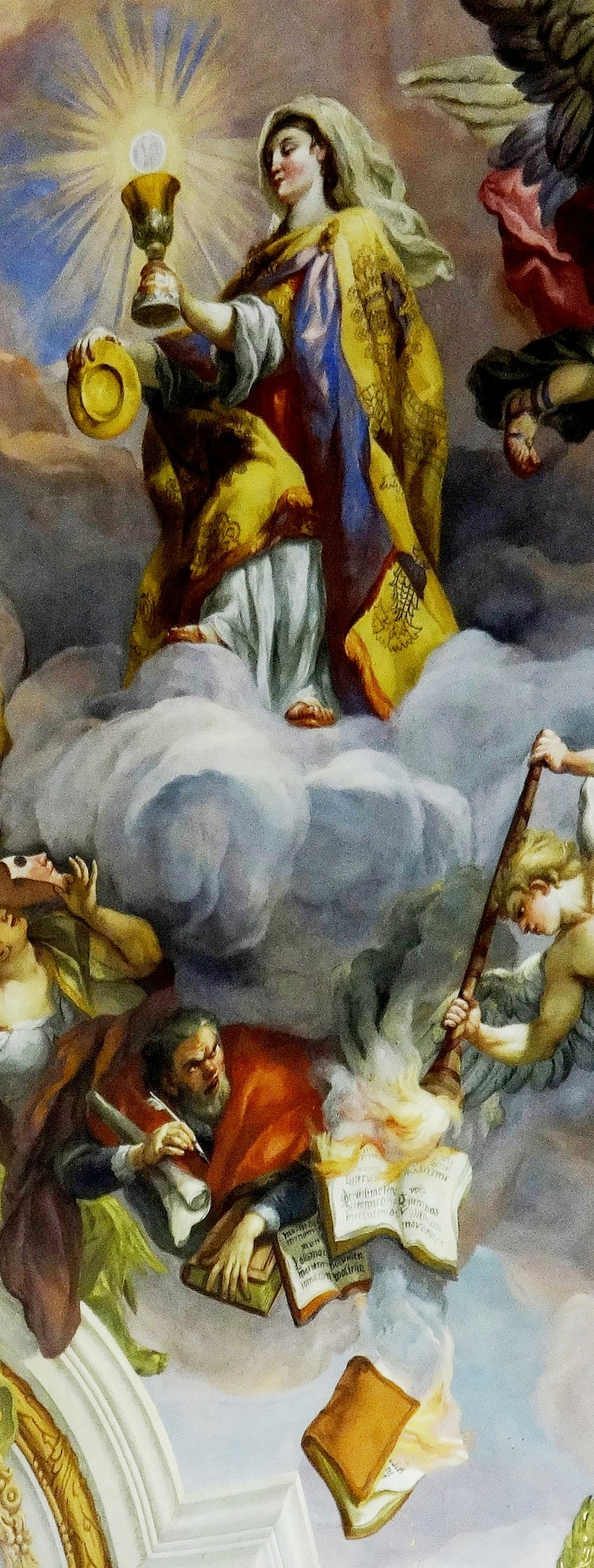
Johann Michael Rottmayr (1729): The Catholic faith defeats Protestant heresies; part of a fresco inside Karlskirche in Vienna

Like his contemporary Palestrina, the Flemish composer Jacobus de Kerle (1531/32–1591) was also credited with giving a model of composition for the Council of Trent. His composition in four parts, Preces, marks the "official turning point of the Counter Reformation's a cappella ideal." Kerle was the only ranking composer of the Netherlands to have acted in conformity with the council. Another musical giant on equal standing with Palestrina, Orlando di Lasso (1530/32–1594) was an important figure in music history though less of a purist than Palestrina. He expressed sympathy for the council's concerns but still showed favor for the "Parady chanson Masses."

Despite the dearth of edicts from the council regarding polyphony and textual clarity, the reforms that followed from the 22nd session filled in the gaps left by the council in stylistic areas. In the 24th session the council gave authority to "Provincial Synods" to discern provisions for Church music. The decision to leave practical application and stylistic matters to local ecclesiastical leaders was important in shaping the future of Catholic church music. It was left then up to the local Church leaders and Church musicians to find proper application for the council's decrees.

Though originally theological and directed towards the attitudes of the musicians, the Council's decrees came to be thought of by Church musicians as a pronouncement on proper musical styles. This understanding was most likely spread through musicians who sought to implement the council's declarations but did not read the official Tridentine pronouncements. Church musicians were probably influenced by order from their ecclesiastical patrons. Composers who reference the council's reforms in prefaces to their compositions do not adequately claim a musical basis from the council but a spiritual and religious basis of their art.

The Cardinal Archbishop of Milan, Charles Borromeo, was a very important figure in reforming Church music after the Council of Trent. Though Borromeo was an aide to the pope in Rome and was unable to be in Milan, he eagerly pushed for the decrees of the council to be quickly put into practice in Milan. Borromeo kept in contact with his church in Milian through letters and eagerly encouraged the leaders there to implement the reforms coming from the Council of Trent. In one of his letters to his vicar in the Milan diocese, Nicolo Ormaneto of Verona, Borromeo commissioned the master of the chapel, Vincenzo Ruffo (1508–1587), to write a Mass that would make the words as easy to understand as possible. Borromeo also suggested that if Don Nicola, a composer of a more chromatic style, was in Milan he too could compose a Mass and the two be compared for textural clarity. Borromeo was likely involved or heard of the questions regarding textual clarity because of his request to Ruffo.

Ruffo took Borromeo's commission seriously and set out to compose in a style that presented the text so that all words would be intelligible and the textual meaning be the most important part of the composition. His approach was to move all the voices in a homorhythmic manner with no complicated rhythms, and to use dissonance very conservatively. Ruffo's approach was certainly a success for textual clarity and simplicity, but if his music was very theoretically pure it was not an artistic success despite Ruffo's attempts to bring interest to the monotonous four-part texture. Ruffo's compositional style which favored the text was well in line with the council's perceived concern with intelligibility. Thus the belief in the council's strong edicts regarding textual intelligibility became to characterize the development of sacred Church music.

The Council of Trent brought about other changes in music: most notably developing the Missa brevis, Lauda and "Spiritual Madrigal" (Madrigali Spirituali). Additionally, the numerous sequences were mostly prohibited in the 1570 Missal of Pius V. The remaining sequences were Victimae paschali laudes for Easter, Veni Sancte Spiritus for Pentecost, Lauda Sion Salvatorem for Corpus Christi, and Dies Irae for All Souls and for Masses for the Dead.

Another reform following the Council of Trent was the publication of the 1568 Roman Breviary.

=== Calendrical studies ===
More celebrations of holidays and similar events raised a need to have these events followed closely throughout the dioceses. But there was a problem with the accuracy of the calendar: by the sixteenth century the Julian calendar was almost ten days out of step with the seasons and the heavenly bodies. Among the astronomers who were asked to work on the problem of how the calendar could be reformed was Nicolaus Copernicus, a canon at Frombork (Frauenburg). In the dedication to De revolutionibus orbium coelestium (1543), Copernicus mentioned the reform of the calendar proposed by the Fifth Council of the Lateran (1512–1517). As he explains, a proper measurement of the length of the year was a necessary foundation to calendar reform. By implication, his work replacing the Ptolemaic system with a heliocentric model was prompted in part by the need for calendar reform.

An actual new calendar had to wait until the Gregorian calendar in 1582. At the time of its publication, De revolutionibus passed with relatively little comment: little more than a mathematical convenience that simplified astronomical references for a more accurate calendar. Physical evidence suggesting Copernicus's theory regarding the earth's motion was literally true promoted the apparent heresy against the religious thought of the time. As a result, during the Galileo affair, Galileo Galilei was placed under house arrest, served in Rome, Siena, Arcetri, and Florence, for publishing writings said to be "vehemently suspected of being heretical." His opponents condemned heliocentric theory and temporarily banned its teaching in 1633. Similarly, the Academia Secretorum Naturae in Naples had been shut down in 1578. As a result of clerical opposition, heliocentricists emigrated from Catholic to Protestant areas, some forming the Melanchthon Circle.

== Major figures ==
- Anthony Zaccaria
- Teresa of Ávila (1515–1582)
- Robert Bellarmine
- Charles V, Holy Roman Emperor (1500–1558)
- Charles Borromeo
- Peter Canisius (1521–1597)
- Francisco Suárez
- Thomas Cajetan
- Gabriel Vásquez
- Luis de León
- Erasmus
- John Eck
- John Fisher
- John of the Cross
- Ferdinand II, Holy Roman Emperor (1578–1637)
- Leopold I, Holy Roman Emperor (1640–1705)
- Louis XIV (1638–1715)
- Ignatius of Loyola
- Mary I of England (1553–1558)
- Mary, Queen of Scots (1542–1587)
- Catherine de' Medici
- Thomas More
- Luis de Molina
- Péter Pázmány (1570–1637)
- Philip II of Spain (1527–1598)
- Philip Neri (1515–1595)
- Pope Leo X (1513–1521)
- Pope Pius III (1503)
- Pope Paul III (1534–1549)
- Pope Julius III (1550–1555)
- Pope Paul IV (1555–1559)
- Pope Pius IV (1559–1565)
- Pope Pius V (1566–1572)
- Pope Gregory XIII (1572–1585)
- Pope Sixtus V (1585–1590)
- Matteo Ricci (1552–1610)
- Cardinal Richelieu (1585–1642)
- Francis de Sales
- Sigismund the Old of Poland (1467–1548)
- Sigismund III of Poland (1566–1632)
- Francis Xavier (1506–1552)
- Peter Paul Rubens (1577–1640)
- William V, Duke of Bavaria (1548–1626)
- Maximilian I, Elector of Bavaria (1573–1651)
- Vincent de Paul

== See also ==
- Anti-Papalism
- Anti-Protestantism
- Catholic-Protestant relations
- Corpus Catholicorum (series)
- Counter-Reformation in Poland
- Crusades
- European wars of religion
- History of the Catholic Church
- League for Catholic Counter-Reformation
- Second scholasticism
- Spanish Inquisition
- Symbolism of domes
- Religious reorganization of the Spanish Netherlands

== Bibliography ==
- Beales, Derek (2005). Enlightenment and Reform in Eighteenth-Century Europe. London: I.B.Tauris. ISBN 1-86064-950-5.
- Firpo, Massimo (May 2016). "Rethinking "Catholic Reform" and "Counter-Reformation": What Happened in Early Modern Catholicism—a View from Italy". Journal of Early Modern History. 20 (3). Brill: 293–312. doi:10.1163/15700658-12342506. ISSN 1385-3783.
- Leichtentritt, Hugo (1944). "The Reform of Trent and Its Effect on Music". The Musical Quarterly, Vol. 30, No. 3. in JSTOR Archived 2016-01-31 at the Wayback Machine.
- Lockwood, Lewis H. (1957). "Vincenzo Ruffo and Musical Reform after the Council of Trent". The Musical Quarterly, Vol. 43, No. 3, in JSTOR Archived 2016-01-31 at the Wayback Machine.
- Manzetti, Leo P. (1928). "Palestrina". The Musical Quarterly, Vol. 14, No. 3, in JSTOR Archived 2016-06-11 at the Wayback Machine.
- Monson, Craig A. (2002). "The Council of Trent Revisited." Journal of the American Musicological Society, Vol. 55, No. 1, in JSTOR
