= Vernazza (disambiguation) =

Vernazza is a town and commune in Liguria, Italy.

Vernazza may also refer to:

- Livia Vernazza (1590–1655), Genoese noble and wife of Don Giovanni de' Medici
- Paolo Vernazza (born 1979), English football player
- Santiago Vernazza (born 1928), former Argentine football player
- Battistina Vernazza (1497-1587), Italian canoness regular and mystical writer
- Johnny 'V' Vernazza (born 1950), American guitar player with Elvin Bishop on "Fooled Around and Fell in Love"

== Other uses ==
- Vernazza (grape), another name for the Italian wine grape Bianchetta Trevigiana
- Vernaccia bianca, another Italian wine grape that is also known as Vernazza
- Erbaluce bianca, also known as Vernazza di Gattinara
