= Zuckermandel =

Zuckermandel or Zuckermandl is a surname. Notable people with the surname include:

- Moses Samuel Zuckermandl (1836-1917), Czech-German rabbi
- Lorenz Zuckermandel (1847-1928), German banker, investor and translator of Dante Alighieri's Divine Comedy
- Gustaf Zuckermandel, Jr., fictional character in the Left Behind series

Zuckermandel or Zuckermantel is also an area in Bratislava, Slovakia, part of the historical Podhradie.
