= Oratory of Divine Love =

Italian Catholic ecclesiastical reform movement

The Oratory of Divine Love was an Italian Catholic ecclesiastical reform movement that originated in Genoa at the end of the 15th century. The notary, Ettore Vernazza (father of the mystic nun, Battistina Vernazza), played a key role in its formation - along with three other Genoese citizens, Giovanni Battista Salvago, Nicolo Grimaldi, and Benedetto Lomellino, and with the advice and inspiration of Catherine of Genoa (Caterina Fieschi Adorno). Bernardino da Feltre had founded the Oratory of San Girolamo in the Italian city of Vicenza in 1494. In 1497 Vernazza established the Society of the Handkerchief (Compagnia del Mandiletto), a grouping whose purpose was to gather alms for the poor, and which was to overtake Vicenza in significance. In 1499 he founded a hospital for incurables (Societas reductus incurabilium), the first of its kind in Italy. It was approved by the Genoese Senate on 27 November 1500, and privileged by Popes Julius II and Leo X.

The Oratory in Rome was established in the Trastevere district around 1514-17, where both prelates and laymen would meet in the Church of Santi Silvestri e Dorotea frequently to discuss ecclesiastical reform. It was modelled on Genoa but its membership was more exclusive, with 50 (mainly aristocratic) members. Pope Leo X formally approved the rule on 24 March 1514, which meant membership was restricted to 36 laymen and four priests. The rule prescribed a fixed program of prayers, a weekly fast, monthly confession, and Communion four times a year. Members of the Oratory cared for orphans, helped the poor, consoled imprisoned criminals, and attended the sick in hospital. To facilitate their work throughout all classes of society, the names of the members of the oratory and its program were kept secret from others. It was finally disbanded at the Sack of Rome in 1527, but its spirit survived in the hospital for incurables of S. Giacomo in Augusta and in the reform measures championed by its members, such as Gian Matteo Giberti, Bishop of Verona, Cajetan and Gian Pietro Carafa, as well as Jacopo Sadoleto, Luigi Lippomano, and Gasparo Contarini.

Similar oratories were subsequently founded around the same time at Milan, Florence, Lucca, Brescia (established by Bartolomeo Stella in 1517), Faenza, Verone (established by Cajetan, Padua, Rome, and Naples. Often in an atmosphere of secrecy, although members did not take vows.

== See also ==
- Oratory of Eternal Wisdom
