= Battistina Vernazza =

Italian canoness and writer (1497–1587)

Battistina Vernazza (secular name Tommasina Vernazza) (born at Genoa, 1497; died there, 1587) was an Italian canoness regular and mystical writer.

== Life ==
Her father, Ettore Vernazza, was a patrician, founder of several hospitals for the sick poor in Genoa, Rome, and Naples. He was also known for founding the ecclesiastical reform society the Oratory of Divine Love. Her godmother was Catherine Fieschi-Adorno, known as Catherine of Genoa. At the early age of 13, Tommasina entered the monastery of Santa Maria delle Grazie, and became a canoness regular, taking the name of Battistina. She filled at various times the office of treasurer, novice-mistress, and prioress.

== Works ==
She wrote, among other things, a commentary on the Pater Noster; "The Union of the soul with God"; "Of the knowledge of God"; "Of prayer"; "Of the heavenly joys and of the means of attaining them"; "Of those who have risen with Christ"; meditations, spiritual canticles, and letters to eminent men of her time. Possevin speaks of her writings as inspired. Her works were published at Venice in 3 vols. in 1588. They have been published many times since.

Her sixteen treatises were originally sent to Gasparo Scotti, her confessor, who was the canon of a basilica in Rome. Scotti published the treatises, though this publication only occurred after her death.
