= Émile Mâle =

French art historian

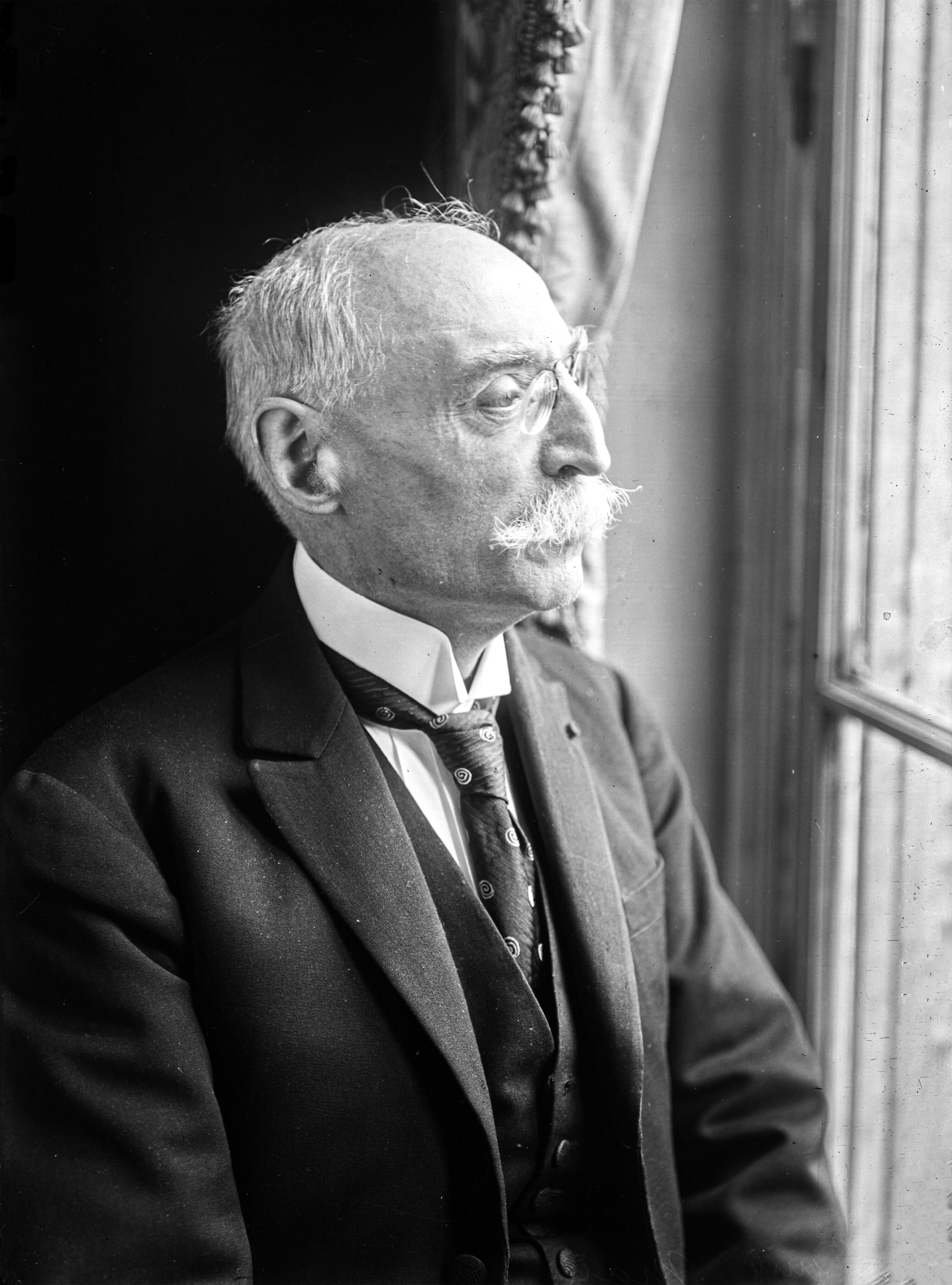

Émile Mâle (French: [emil mɑl]; 2 June 1862 – 6 October 1954) was a French art historian, one of the first to study medieval, mostly sacral French art and the influence of Eastern European iconography thereon. He was a member of the Académie française, and a director of the Académie de France à Rome.

== Biography ==
Mâle was born in Commentry, Auvergne. A pupil at the École normale supérieure, he received his degree in 1886. He taught rhetoric at Saint-Étienne, then at the University of Toulouse. He received his doctorate in 1899. Having taught a course in the history of Christian art at the Sorbonne since 1906, he held the chair in history of art there from 1912. He was the successor to Louis Duchesne as head of the French Academy in Rome, 1923–1937. Among Mâle's many contributions to the understanding of the art of bygone eras were his explanations of iconography and the use of allegory in religious art.

In particular, his doctoral thesis on the Gothic art of France (revised over three editions) L'Art religieux du XIIIe siècle en France (1899) translated into English as The Gothic Image: Religious Art in France of the Thirteenth Century from the third edition of 1910 (or omitting "The Gothic Image" from title, especially in the US) remains in print.

He died in Fontaine-Chaalis, Oise.

== Honours ==
- Member of the Académie des Inscriptions et Belles-Lettres (1918)
- Member of the Académie royale de Belgique
- Member of the British Academy
- Member of the Académie française
- Grand officier of the Légion d'honneur

== Works ==
- Quomodo Sybillas recentiores artifices representaverint (1899)
- L'Art religieux du XIIIe siècle en France (1899) - doctoral thesis. Translated into English as The Gothic Image: Religious Art in France of the Thirteenth Century from 3rd edition of 1910, 1913, Dent & Co., London, Dover Books US (omitting "The Gothic Image" from title, still in print), and other editions. Translated into German by Lorenz Zuckermandel as Die kirchliche Kunst des XIII. Jahrhunderts in Frankreich: Studie über die Ikonographie des Mittelalters und ihre Quellen. Straßburg: Verlag J. H. Ed. Heitz, 1907.
- L'Art religieux de la fin du Moyen Âge en France (1908) also in English, Princeton 1986, Religious Art in France: The Late Middle Ages: A Study of Medieval Iconography and Its Sources (ISBN 0-691-09914-6)
- L'Art allemand et l'art français du Moyen Âge (1917)
- L'Art religieux du XIIe siècle en France (1922) also in English, Princeton 1978
- Art et artistes du Moyen Âge (1927), also in English, Black Swan Books, 1986 Art and Artists of the Middle Ages (ISBN 0-933806-06-X)
- L'Art religieux après le Concile de Trente, étude sur l'iconographie de la fin du XVIe, du XVIIe et du XVIIIe siècles en Italie, en France, en Espagne et en Flandre (1932)
- Rome et ses vieilles églises (1942) trans. The Early Churches of Rome, Ernest Benn Ltd., London 1960.
- Les Mosaïques chrétiennes primitives du IVe au VIIe siècle (1943)
- L'Art religieux du XIIe au XVIIIe siècle (1945) and English translation: Religious Art from the Twelfth to the Eighteenth Century (ISBN 0-691-00347-5)
- Jean Bourdichon: les Heures d'Anne de Bretagne à la Bibliothèque nationale (1946)
- Les Grandes Heures de Rohan (1947)
- Notre-Dame de Chartres (1948) also in English, Chartres, Harper & Row, 1983
- La Fin du paganisme en Gaule et les plus anciennes basiliques chrétiennes (1950)
- La Cathédrale d'Albi (1950)
- Histoire de l'art (2 volumes, 1950, editor)
- Les Saints Compagnons du Christ (1958, posthumous publication)
