= Saint Cajetan =

Italian Catholic priest (1480–1547)

Saint Cajetan CR
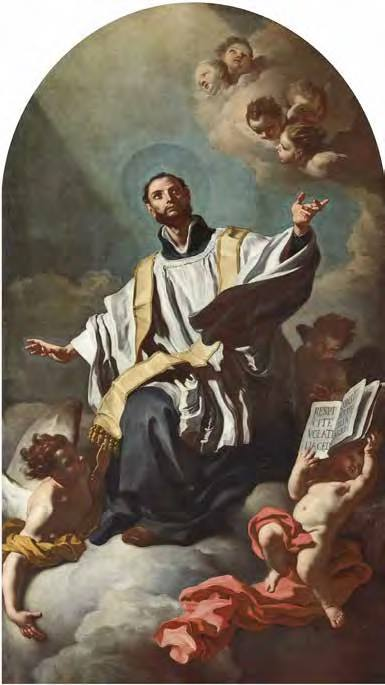
- Portrait of Saint Cajetan

Confessor of the Faith
- Born: October 1480; Vicenza, Republic of Venice (now Veneto, Italy)
- Died: 7 August 1547 (aged 66); Naples, Kingdom of Naples (now Campania, Italy)
- Venerated in: Catholic Church
- Beatified: 8 October 1629, Saint Peter's Basilica, Papal States by Pope Urban VIII
- Canonized: 12 April 1671, Saint Peter's Basilica, Papal States by Pope Clement X
- Major shrine: San Paolo Maggiore, Naples, Italy
- Feast: 7 August
- Attributes: priest's attire, stole, missal

Gaetano dei Conti di Thiene CR (October 1480 – 7 August 1547), known in English as Saint Cajetan (/ˈkædʒətən/ KAJ-ə-tən), was an Italian Catholic priest and religious reformer, co-founder of the Theatines. He is recognised as a saint in the Catholic Church, and his feast day is 7 August.

== Life ==
Cajetan was born in October 1480, the son of Gaspar, lord of Thiene, and Mary Porta, persons of the first rank among the nobility of the territory of Vicenza, in Veneto Region.

His father died when he was two years of age. Quiet and retiring by nature, Cajetan was predisposed to piety by his mother. Cajetan studied law in Padua, receiving his degree as doctor utriusque juris (i.e., in civil and canon law) at age 24. In 1506 he worked as a diplomat for Pope Julius II, with whom he helped reconcile the Republic of Venice. However, he was not ordained a priest until the year 1516.

With the death of Pope Julius II in 1513, Cajetan withdrew from the papal court. Recalled to Vicenza by the death of his mother, he founded in 1522 a hospital for incurables there. By 1523, he had established a hospital in Venice, as well. His interests were as much or more devoted to spiritual healing than the physical kind, and he joined a confraternity in Rome called the "Oratory of Divine Love". He intended to form a group that would combine the spirit of monasticism with the exercises of the active ministry.

== Theatines ==
A new congregation was canonically erected by Pope Clement VII in the year 1524. One of his four companions was Giovanni Pietro Carafa, the Bishop of Chieti, elected first superior of the order, who later became pope as Paul IV. From the name of the city of Chieti (in Latin: Theate), arose the name by which the order is known, the "Theatines". The order grew at a fairly slow pace: there were only twelve Theatines during the sack of Rome in 1527, during which Cajetan was tortured by mutinous soldiers of Charles V.

The Theatines managed to escape to Venice, where Cajetan met Jerome Emiliani, whom he assisted in the establishment of his Congregation of Clerks Regular. In 1533, he founded a house in Naples. The year 1540 found him in Venice again and from there he extended his work to Verona. He founded a bank to help the poor and offer an alternative to usurers (who charged high interest rates). It later became the Banco di Napoli.

Cajetan died in Naples on 7 August 1547. His remains are in the church of San Paolo Maggiore in Naples; outside the church is Piazza San Gaetano, with a statue.

== Veneration ==
He was beatified on 8 October 1629 by Pope Urban VIII. On 12 April 1671, Cajetan was canonized by Pope Clement X. Saint Cajetan's feast day is celebrated on 7 August.

Jesuit missionary Eusebio Kino in 1691 established the mission San Cayetano de Tumacácori in honour of Cajetan. It is now Tumacacori National Historical Park in Arizona.

He is known as the patron saint of Argentina and of the unemployed.

== See also ==
- Theatines
- Sant'Andrea della Valle
