= Lorenz Zuckermandel =

German banker, investor, founder and translator

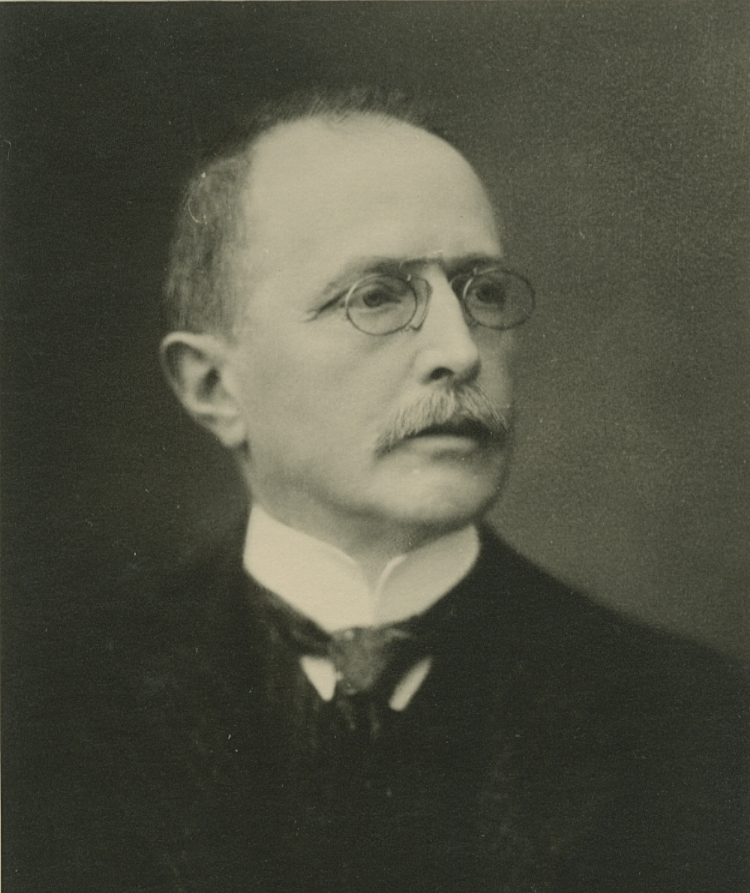
- Photograph of Lorenz Zuckermandel in 1901
- Born: 18 February 1847
- Died: 6 January 1928 (aged 80)
- Known for: translating the Divine Comedy into German

Lorenz Zuckermandel (18 February 1847 – 6 January 1928) was a German banker, investor, founder, and translator; among other things, of Dante Alighieri's Divine Comedy. Born the son of a poor farmer in Bürglein, located in the district of Ansbach, he eventually became part of Berlin's financial establishment in the second half of the 19th century and joined the ranks of the bourgeoisie at the time.

== Life ==
=== Childhood and youth ===
Lorenz Zuckermandel's parents, Johann Friedrich and Katharina Margaretha (née Pirner), were smallholder farmers at Meckenweber in Bürglein (house No. 19), on the former territory of the Bavarian Cistercian monastery of Heilsbronn, where the family had settled since 1777.

Lorenz was the fifth of six children and attended the village school, where he academically excelled. When he was 14 years old, his father died at the age of 57, and the widow was no longer able to take care of all her children. She had to give away her son Lorenz. He was taken in by a family friend, a forester, and moved to the forester's residence in Ansbach, where he attended secondary school. Here, too, he was best in class and received the city's award for best academic performance.

=== Professional life ===
After completing school with outstanding grades, he embarked on an apprenticeship at the Erlanger & Söhne bank in Frankfurt. Soon after completing his apprenticeship, he was appointed as a director of the newly founded Oldenburgische Landesbank, which was founded in collaboration with the Erlanger & Söhne bank on 15 January 1869. According to the Reichsbankengesetz (Reichsbank Act) enacted by Prussia in 1875, the Oldenburgische Landesbank had the right to issue bank notes. However, in spite of the limitations that this entailed, it has been in the credit, deposits, and securities business since its founding.

Lorenz Zuckermandel was a gifted linguist and mastered English with virtually no accent. He also spoke fluent French. Afterwards, he learned Spanish, which allowed him to fill in for the director of the Madrid branch in 1872. Family documents point to Italy as a popular travel destination and highlight the importance of Italian art, culture and language.

=== Marriage and children ===
During his time in Frankfurt he met Robert Bassermann (1846–1907), the branch manager of the Köster & Cie bank from Mannheim. Besides their professional activities, their interest in foreign languages saw them become close. In 1890, Lorenz met Robert's niece Elisabeth at the parental home at Gockelsmarkt in Mannheim. Elisabeth's brother was Albert Bassermann, who later became a famous actor.

On 18 June 1892 and at 45 years of age, Lorenz married Elisabeth Bassermann – 18 years his junior – with whom he had six children: Louis Alexander Walter (1893–1915), Erich (1895–1915), Paul (1897–1988), Ludwig (1898–1973), Ingeborg Anna Leonore (1901–1986) and Sofi Elisabeth (1903–1999).

=== Ascent into the financial establishment ===
As director of the Oldenburgische Landesbank, Lorenz Zuckermandel had connections to the most powerful men in commerce and industry. He successfully became a wealthy man through share purchases and speculative deals during Germany's industrialisation, which was in full swing. In the early 1880s, Lorenz Zuckermandel and two of his business associates took over the bank C. Schlesinger-Trier & Cie., a partnership limited by shares and a long-established private bank in Berlin.

By virtue of his success during Germany's years of rapid industrial expansion, as a leading figure of the financial establishment Lorenz Zuckermandel was part of the bourgeoisie. Befitting their social status, the young married couple – together with their coachman, cook, nannies, laundress and dressmaker – resided in a luxurious villa with park in the then Berlin suburb of Charlottenburg, with many social commitments. Every evening, they were either the hosts or the guests.

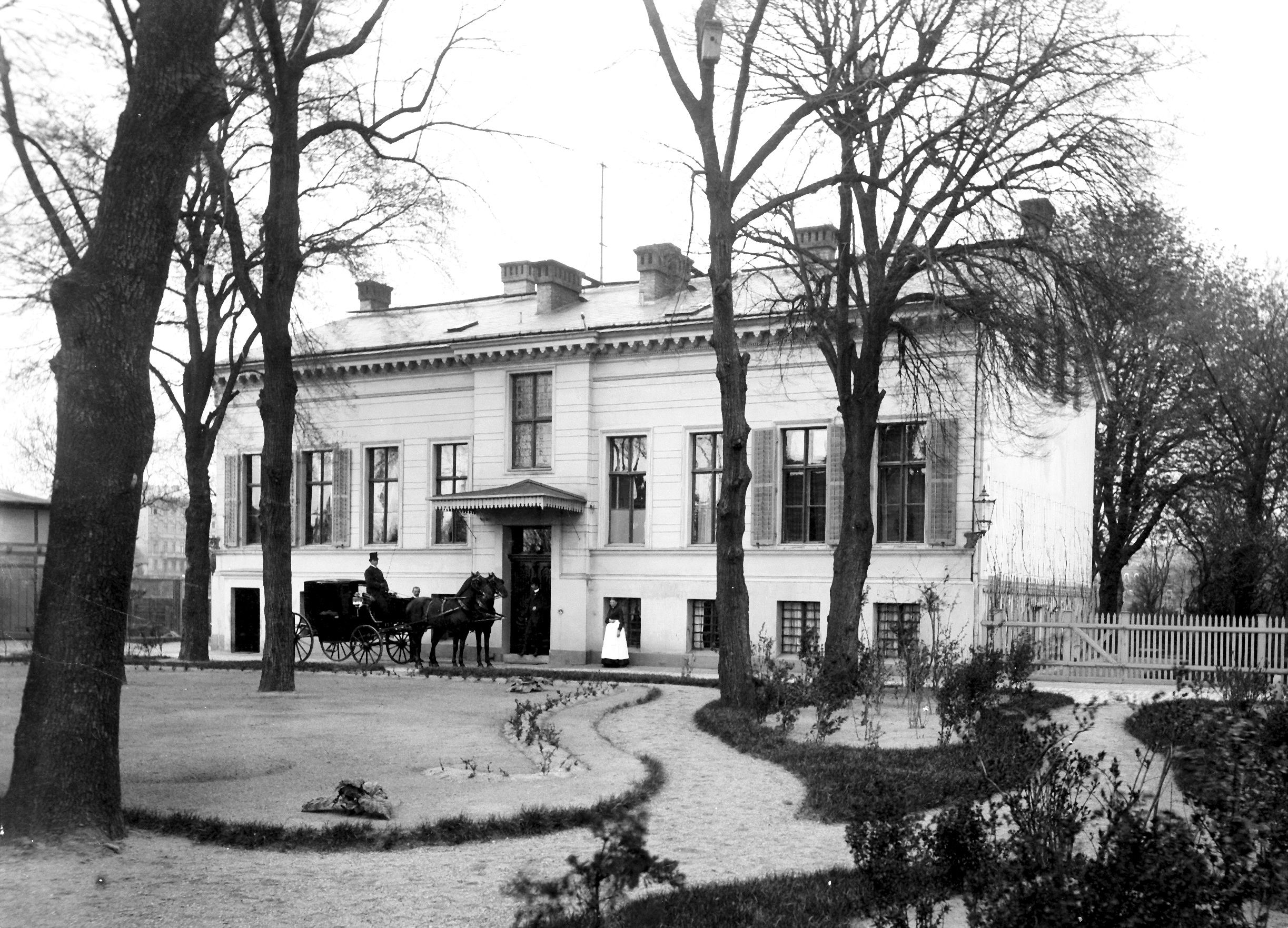
Villa of the Zuckermandel family in Berlin Charlottenburg, around 1890

In October 1893, they moved into a newly rented city apartment at Voss Straße 2 in an extensive area on the first floor, only a few houses away from the bank. After spending the winter in the city, the family moved to Charlottenburg every spring.

In the years following 1900, tenements arose around the villa's park in Charlottenburg, and from 1907 to 1908, Lorenz Zuckermandel built a tenement – now protected under law as a historical monument – on one part of the property between Schlossstraße and Fritschestraße.

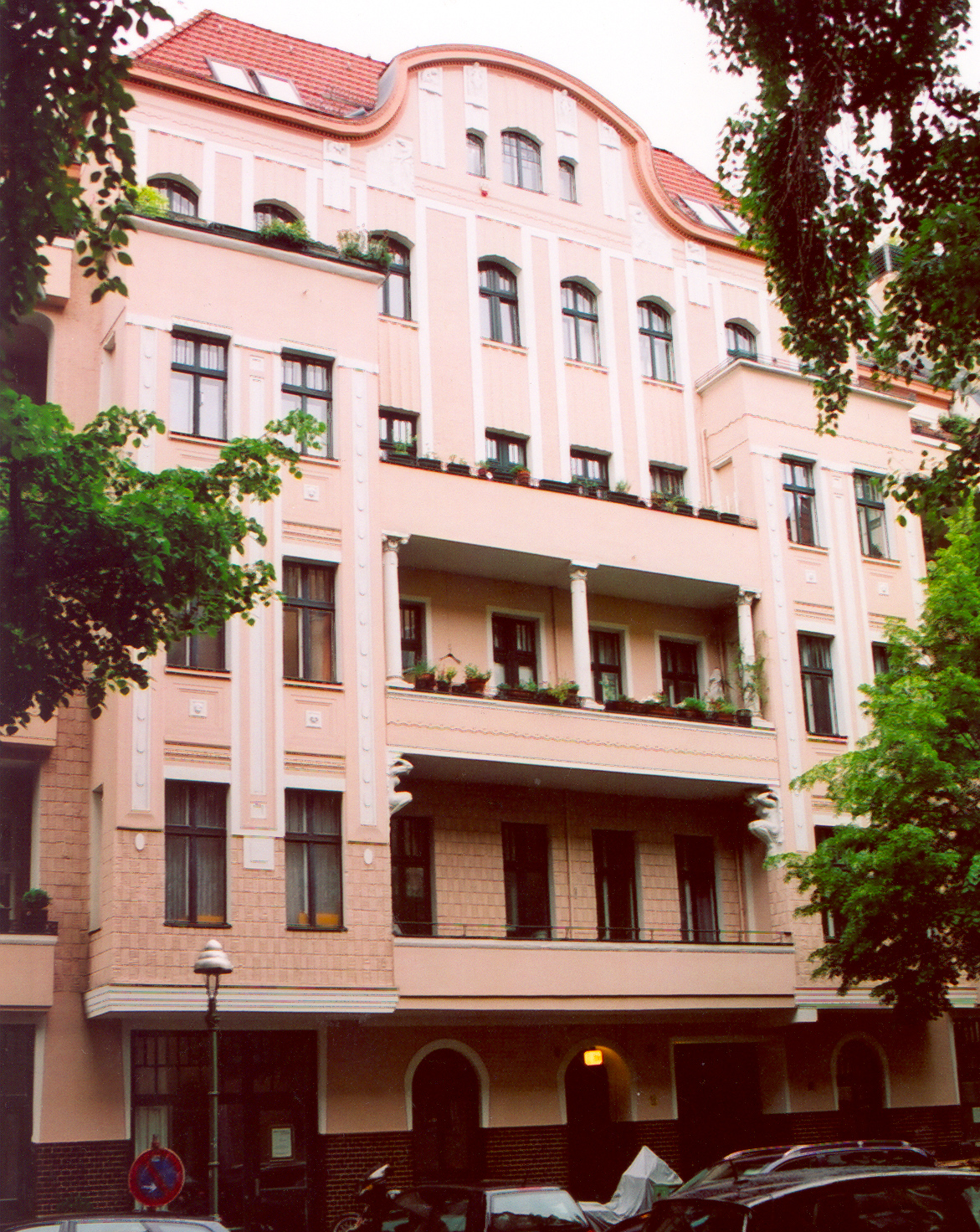
Historical building Fritschestraße 26 in Berlin Charlottenburg (1907–08)

The villa in Charlottenburg was torn down in 1906/07 and replaced in 1908 by the Flossmann villa in Rottach at Tegernsee, including surrounding meadows and a small forest. As a Bavarian among Bavarians, he had an excellent rapport with Flossmann, the former owner of the villa, and undertook many mountain tours with him. Each year, the family spent the summer months in Rottach at Tegernsee.

In 1908 or 1909, the family moved from Voss Straße 2 to the newly acquired Palais Bendlerstraße 33 in the immediate vicinity of the Tiergarten.

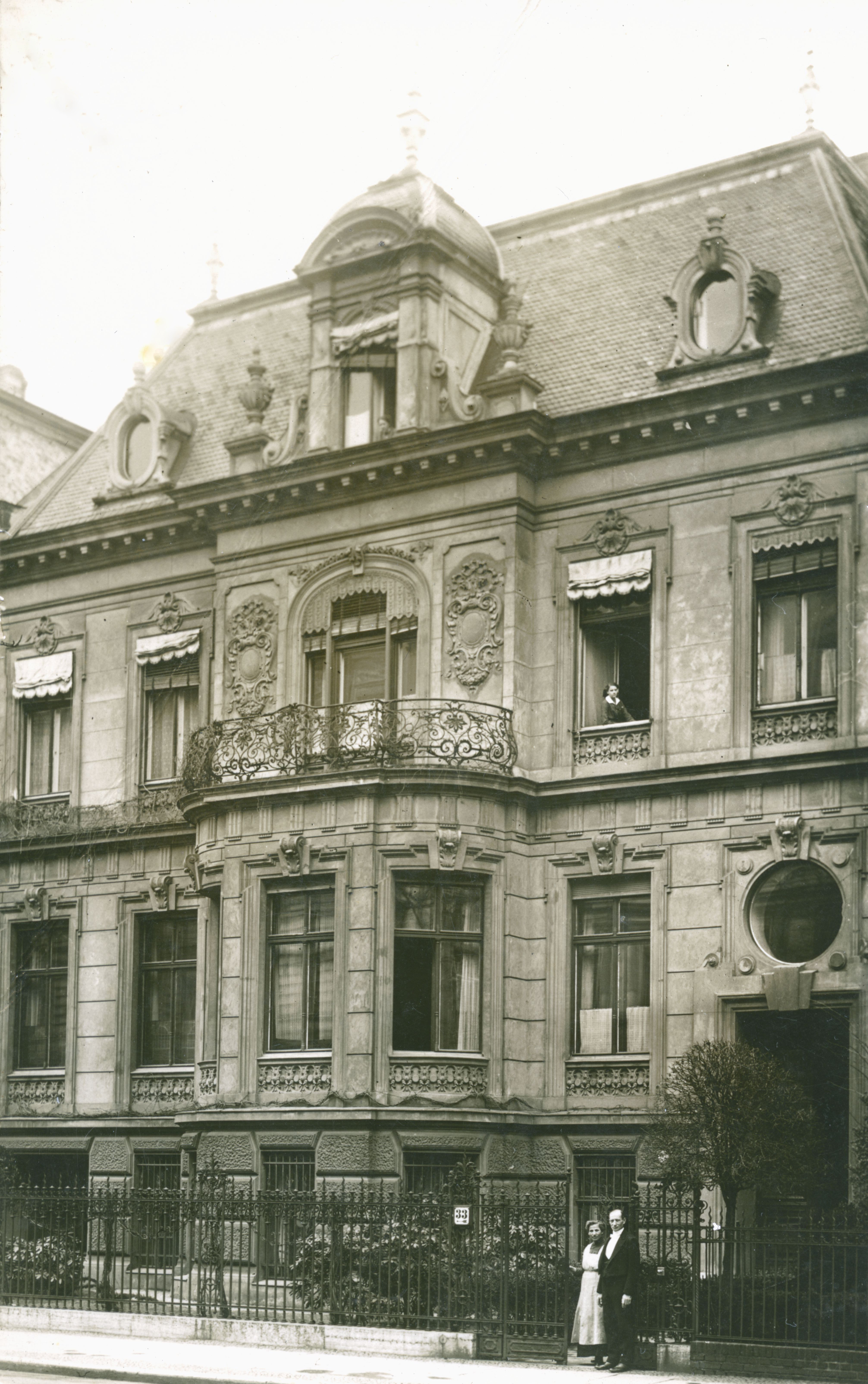
Palais of the Zuckermandel family at Bendlerstraße 33 in Berlin around 1909

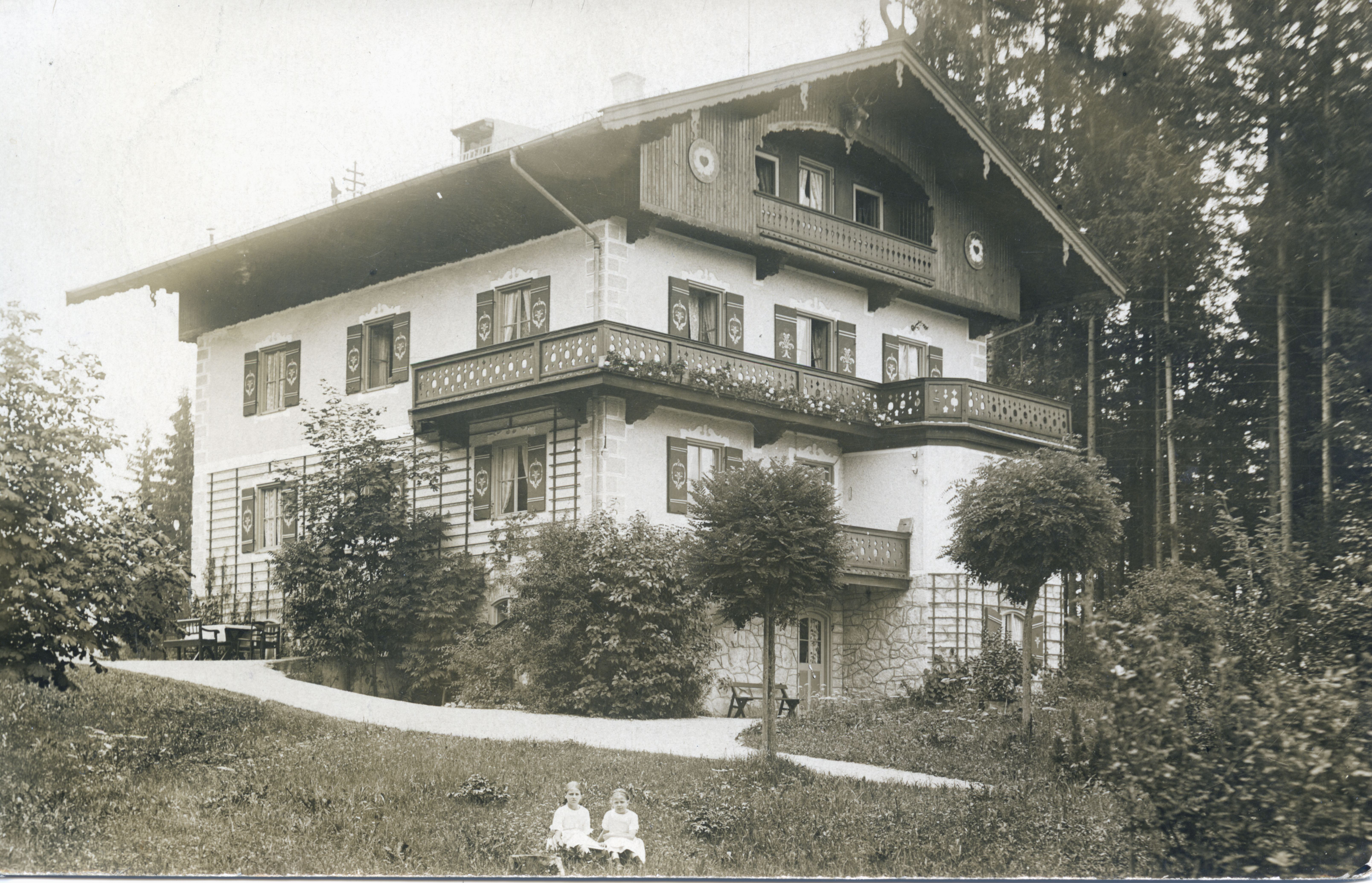
House of the Zuckermandel family in Rottach at Tegernsee around 1912

At 60 years of age, Lorenz Zuckermandel was one of Berlin's wealthiest men. It was estimated that his capital, the majority of which represented shares in the heavy industry, was worth 4 million goldmarks. In 1912, at 65 years of age, he completely retired from the banking business, but continued to enjoy a reputation as a financier due to his large fortune. He resigned from his position on the supervisory boards in 1917.

=== Retirement and death ===
In the 1920s Zuckermandel lost a large part of his capital due to the inflation that had been accelerating since 1914. He mainly held his assets in shares and failed to switch to stable securities timely.

After the death of both of his oldest sons Walter and Erich (both perished or went missing during the Lake Naroch Offensive during World War I on 1 October 1915), he went into retirement and devoted himself to his translations, mainly his Dante translation. Living of his private means, he used the time to undertake extensive voyages to Spain, Canada, Brazil, Mexico, and Venezuela, some of which he undertook alone.

On 6 January 1928 Lorenz Zuckermandel died of bronchitis close to his 81st birthday. The following appeared in the obituary section of a Berlin newspaper from 7 January 1928: "Last evening, after a short illness, banker Lorenz Zuckermandel – former business owner of C. Schlesinger-Trier & Cie., a partnership limited by shares – passed away at the age of 81. With him yet another old-school personality of the financial establishment disappears, a man with an elegant disposition and most obliging kindness, who put his eminent skills particularly at the service of the industry. For many years, he was a member of the supervisory board of a large number of the most important industrial companies, until he retired from his business life after he had lost both of his promising older sons in the war. This unique man will be remembered by anyone who crossed his path."

The family fortune was almost completely lost during the Great Depression and in the time after 1945.

=== Banker, investor, and founder ===
As a partner of the C. Schlesinger-Trier & Cie. bank – which at the time was one of the well over 1,000 private banks in Germany – Lorenz Zuckermandel on the one hand was an investor due to his share participation, and on the other hand also a co-founder of renowned companies, such as the Rheinische Metallwaaren- und Maschinenfabrik Corporation (which later became Rheinmetall), certified by notary on 13 April 1889. Of the total share capital of 700,000 Reichsmark, the C. Schlesinger-Trier & Cie. bank held a participation of 224,000 Reichsmark, which, at 32%, constituted the largest portion of share capital. Representing the majority shareholder, Lorenz Zuckermandel was appointed as the company's first chairman of the supervisory board, while Thuringian engineer Heinrich Ehrhardt was elected deputy chairman of the board and company manager. For many years, this bank was a pivotal shareholder of Rheinmetall, and although it reduced its share over time, it remained an influential shareholder at the general meetings of shareholders. In April 1897, Lorenz Zuckermandel resigned as chairman of Rheinmetall's supervisory board, but remained an ordinary member of the supervisory body until he ultimately retired on 16 November 1919 The archives reveal that Zuckermandel held a modest share participation as late as 1916. Through their stake in Rheinmetall, C. Schlesinger-Trier & Cie. bank also had the opportunity to finance lucrative arms deals.

Since Lorenz Zuckermandel always acted in the name and for the account of the C. Schlesinger-Trier & Cie. bank, keeping himself in the background as an intermediary, his activities as a banker are difficult to trace. It is known that, among other things, he exercised a supervisory board mandate in the Erlangen Brewery Corporation, which emerged from Erlanger Reifbräu in 1896.

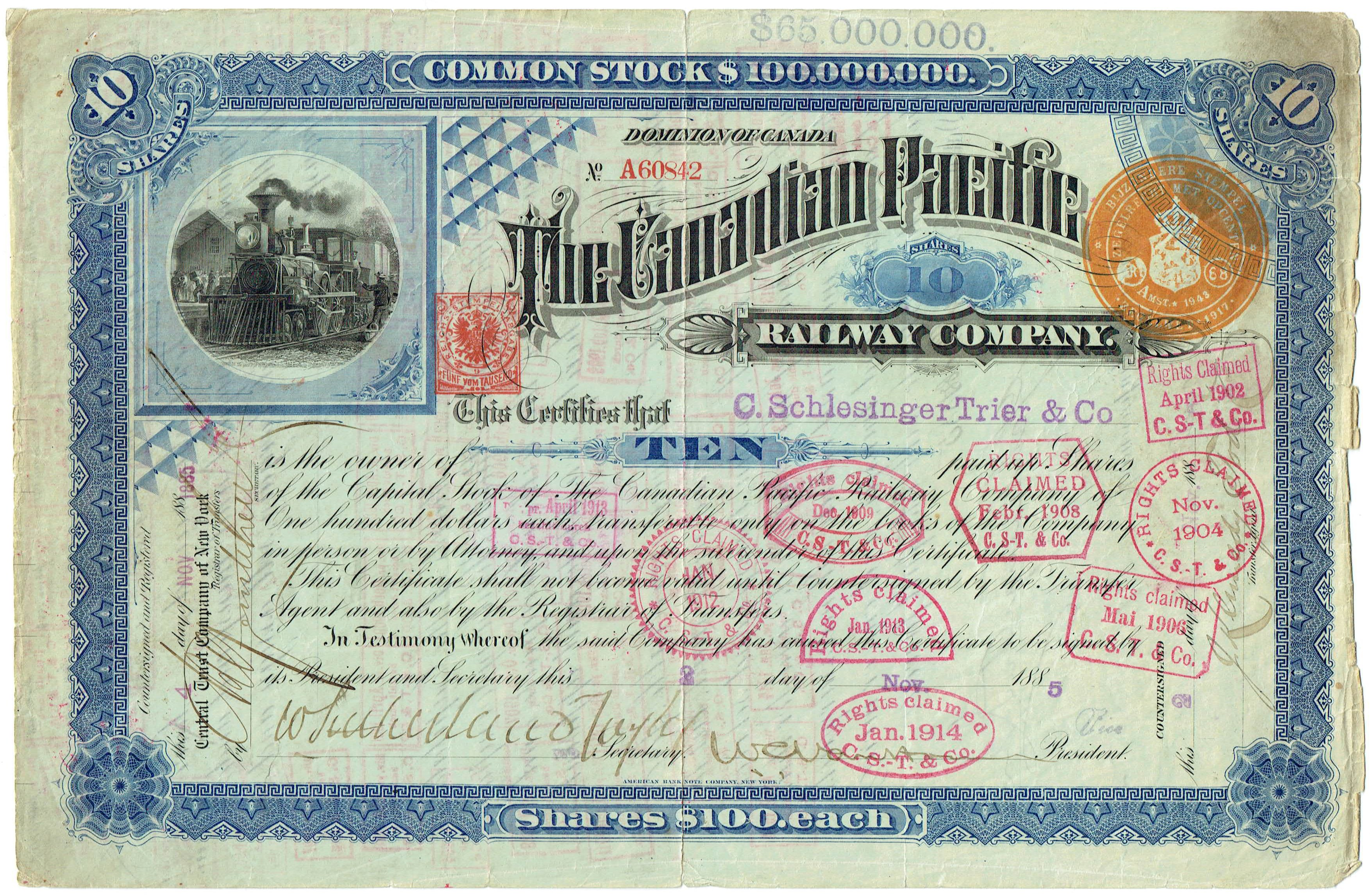
The bank C. Schlesinger-Trier & Cie. was the owner of this share of the Canadian Pacific Railway Company, issued 2 November 1885.

Lorenz Zuckermandel also had dealings with various small and large railway enterprises. One of them was the Canadian Pacific Railway Company (CPR), in which the C. Schlesinger-Trier & Cie. bank and the German National Bank were involved. He carried part of the responsibility for their initial public offering in the 1910s. As a token of appreciation, Sir Thomas George Shaughnessy (1853–1923) CPR's former president, invited Lorenz in 1913 on a weeks long trip to Canada. Due to the indisposition of his wife Elisabeth, Lorenz made the trip in the company of his son Walter and of F. I. Warschauer as representative of the Nationalbank. During this trip they met, among others, Vincent Meredith, Director of the Bank of Montreal, and Richard B. Angus, one of the founding fathers of CPR, who was 84 years old at the time.

Furthermore, Zuckermandel's financial participations or his involvement in the founding of many other railway companies are documented, e.g., the Berlin-Dresdener Eisenbahn-Gesellschaft, the Stadtbahnen Stettin and the Schmalspur-Zahnradbahn der Achenseebahn. The latter was inaugurated in 1889, with Lorenz as a member of the supervisory board.

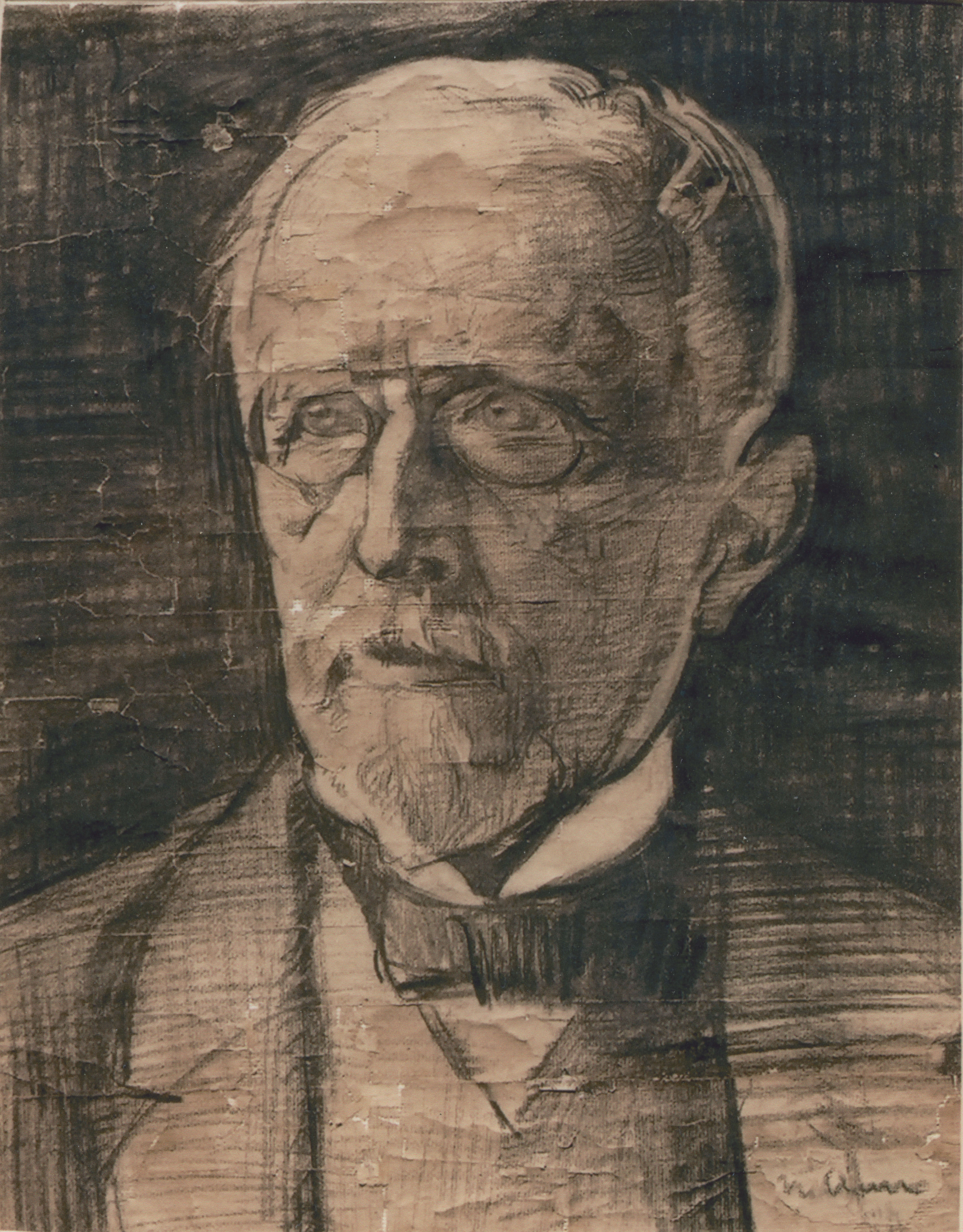
Charcoal drawing of Lorenz Zuckermandel by artist Mr. Hülsmann after a photograph of his later years

=== Translator ===
Lorenz Zuckermandel's translation of Émile Mâle's work L'Art Religieux du XIIIe Siècle en France was published in 1907.

In 1909, he translated Rudyard Kipling's Moti Guj – Mutineer and dedicated it to his then 10-year-old son Ludwig, with the wish that his son would soon be able to read the original himself (unpublished).

Lorenz Zuckermandel, however, is best known for his translations of Dante Alighieri's Divine Comedy, which he started in 1912. Dantes Paradies was published in 1914 and in 1922 in a newly revised edition. Dantes Hölle was published in 1916 and in 1925 in a newly revised edition. Dantes Purgatorium was published in 1920. All editions were published by the publishing house of J. H. Ed. Heitz in Straßburg.

The manuscript of Zuckermandel's Dante translations has not been preserved, nor has the correspondence related to his Dante research (among others with the then president of the Deutsche Dante-Gesellschaft (German Dante Society), Hugo Daffner).

For the purpose of these translations, a veritable Dante library was set up in Bendlerstrasse 33, the material occupying the billiard table in the study room for many years.

Through his wife's family, Lorenz Zuckermandel knew Alfred Bassermann (1855–1935), another Dante translator, whose literary legacy can be found in the library of the University of Freiburg im Breisgau, including Zuckermandel's Dante translations.

=== Patron in his hometown Bürglein ===
Despite his meteoric career, Lorenz Zuckermandel maintained ties to his home village of Bürglein, which he visited until 1919 and where he was known and respected as a philanthropist, although he did not communicate about his background, neither privately nor publicly – not even to his family.

In memory of his two oldest sons, who fell in Russia in 1915, plunging the family in insurmountable mourning, he anonymously donated two church windows and, in September 1917, the church clock for the Johanneskirche in Bürglein.

At a meeting of the Soldaten- und Kriegerkameradschaft Bürglein (Bürglein's soldier and warrior fellowship) held on 1 January 1920, a decision was made to erect a memorial for the fallen and missing soldiers of World War I. The commemorative plaque also bears the names of both of his oldest sons, Walter and Erich Zuckermandel.

Lorenz Zuckermandel also did a lot for Bürglein's water supply system, for which he donated considerable sums on multiple occasions – a total of 14,000 Reichsmarks from 1912 to 1919. Since the citizens of Bürglein could not agree on the construction of a water pipe, the money donated lost all of its value due to the inflation that was setting in (in 1924, 1 billion was worth 1 goldmark).

In accordance with a declaration of intent by Lorenz Zuckermandel dated 8 August 1917, a relief fund for the poor was founded as an annex to the Heding’schen Gedächtnis- und Armenstiftung (Heding’sche memorial and poverty foundation) on condition that the interest yielded by the 4,000 Reichsmarks donation would be distributed among the needy in the community of Bürglein on a yearly basis.

=== Art collector ===
Having a great appreciation for the arts, Lorenz began to amass a considerable collection of paintings long before the young Zuckermandel couple moved into the villa in Charlottenburg. It contained prestigious works from the Renaissance period right through to contemporary painters. Some of these paintings – together with other sculptures, antiques, ceramics, bronzes, furniture and fixtures – were sold at an auction of Lorenz Zuckermandel's estate at the Hugo Helbing galerie in Munich on 5–6 June 1930.

=== Personality ===
Despite his privileged position as a member of the financial establishment, he remained reserved and kept a certain distance from the bourgeoisie society, not letting it become second nature. He always stayed true to himself, unimpressed by the glamour of the military and the bourgeoisie at the time, which he addressed with a touch of humour. His family held him in high esteem and referred to him as "Lorenzo". Family records reveal that his sociable nature allowed him to make friends – from the humblest to the highest educated people – wherever he was. His outstanding intelligence, his broad knowledge, coupled with profound wisdom, kindness and humour, made him an amiable man. His diligence and willingness to take risks made him a successful businessman. He had an eye for all things beautiful, a deep love for nature and was attracted by the great wide world. His brother-in-law, Adolf Bassermann, wrote the following in a 1910 travelogue: “Lorenzo went to great lengths to take care of everything in advance; one feels safe in his company. An homme de vie who knows – or correctly assumes – everything.”

=== Children ===
Both of Lorenz Zuckermandel's oldest sons, Walter and Erich, fell at Lake Narocz in Russia on 1 October 1915. In 1920 they were honoured, together with other soldiers who fell during the war, following a decision by the Soldaten- und Kriegerkameradschaft Bürglein (Bürglein's soldier and warrior fellowship) to plant an oak tree alley in Böllingsdorf, one oak tree for every one of the fallen soldiers. The trees still stand there to this day behind the hall of honour, which was later on erected.

His son Paul became an operetta tenor and lived with his wife in the family guesthouse on his mother's estate at Tegernsee for many years. Ludwig was a stage designer at the theatre in Klagenfurt for many years. He made an attempt to gain ground in Latin America but returned to Germany, where he then lived with his wife at his mother's place. Both daughters Leonore and Elisabeth got married in Brazil and rarely visited Europe in later years.

=== History of the name ===
There are many different versions explaining the name Zuckermandel (also known as Zuckmantel). One version claims that the name has its origins in the Middle Ages and means "highwayman", i.e. someone who purloins a coat (the German is composed of "zuck" as in take and "mantel" for coat). Nowadays, the name "Zuckermantel" is often used as a German place name in the present-day Czech Republic.

== Works ==
- Die kirchliche Kunst des XIII. Jahrhunderts in Frankreich: Studie über die Ikonographie des Mittelalters und ihre Quellen. By Émile Mâle. Translated by L[orenz] Zuckermandel. Straßburg: J. H. Heitz, 1907. XIII, 441 pages: Ill.
- Dantes Hölle. Deutsch von L[orenz] Zuckermandel. Straßburg: Printed and published by J. H. Ed. Heitz, 1916. 247 pages.
- Dantes Hölle. Deutsch von L[orenz]. Zuckermandel. Straßburg: Published by J. H. Ed. Heitz, [1925]. Second newly edited edition. 206 pages. This edition was presented to the members of the German Dante Society together with the 1925 yearbook. The package insert reads: “Thanks to a generous donation by the translator, our long-time member, I am pleased to say that, together with the 1925 yearbook, we are able to give our members the latest released and newly edited edition of Lorenz Zuckermandel – Übersetzung von Dantes Hölle (Lorenz Zuckermandel's translation of Dante's Hell) with a Christmas greeting. I rejoice in this furthering the goals of our society, and would like to add that I wish for this work, which is among the highest quality works so far created, true to its sense and form, and with its pleasant easy-flowing readability and profound simplicity in its expression, to be received and appreciated accordingly. The German Dante Society. Chairman: [Hugo] Daffner.”
- Dantes Purgatorium. Deutsch von L[orenz] Zuckermandel. Straßburg: Published by J. H. Ed. Heitz, 1920. 250 pages.
- Dantes Paradies. Deutsch von L[orenz] Zuckermandel. Straßburg: Printed and published by J. H. Ed. Heitz, 1914. 215 pages.
- Dantes Paradies. Deutsch von L[orenz] Zuckermandel. Straßburg: Published by J. H. Ed. Heitz, 1922. Second newly edited edition. 247 pages.

== Literature ==
- Jobst Hinrich and Francine Ubbelohde-Vanbrusselt [Lorenz Zuckermandel's grandson, 12 September 1928 – 10 October 2020 and his wife Francine Vanbrusselt]: Lorenz and Elisabeth Zuckermandel. Brussels: 1st edition 2007 (available at the public library in Turm, Heilsbronn, Dek Zuc). Brussels: 2nd revised and extended edition 2014 titled Lorenz Zuckermandel (unpublished). Approx. 90 pages with many photos and illustrations from the family archive.
- Jürgen Hufnagel: Lorenz Zuckermandel. In: 900 Jahre Bürglein (1108–2008). Ed. by Jürgen Hufnagel and Hans Gernert. Bürglein: Festausschuss „900 Jahre Bürglein“ (“900 years of Bürglein” festivities committee), June 2008.
- Interview with Jobst Hinrich Ubbelohde about Lorenz Zuckermandel and article titled “Äußerst engagierter Mitfinanzierer der Gründung von Rheinmetall – Lorenz Zuckermandel war der erste Aufsichtsratsvorsitzende des Unternehmens” (extremely dedicated co-financier of the founding of Rheinmetall – Lorenz Zuckermandel was the company's first chairman of the supervisory board) by Dr. Christian Leitzbach. In: Das Profil – Die Zeitung des Rheinmetall Konzerns 4/2010, pg. 14.
- Rheinmetall. Vom Reiz, im Rheinland ein großes Werk zu errichten. By Christian Leitzbach. Cologne: Greven Verlag GmbH, 2014. ISBN 978-3-7743-0641-7 (2 volumes). Story of Rheinmetall's founding incl. a brief biography and a portrait (charcoal drawing) of Lorenz Zuckermandel on pgs. 29–32.
