= Catherine of Genoa =

Italian Catholic saint and mystic (1447-1510)

Saint Catherine of Genoa
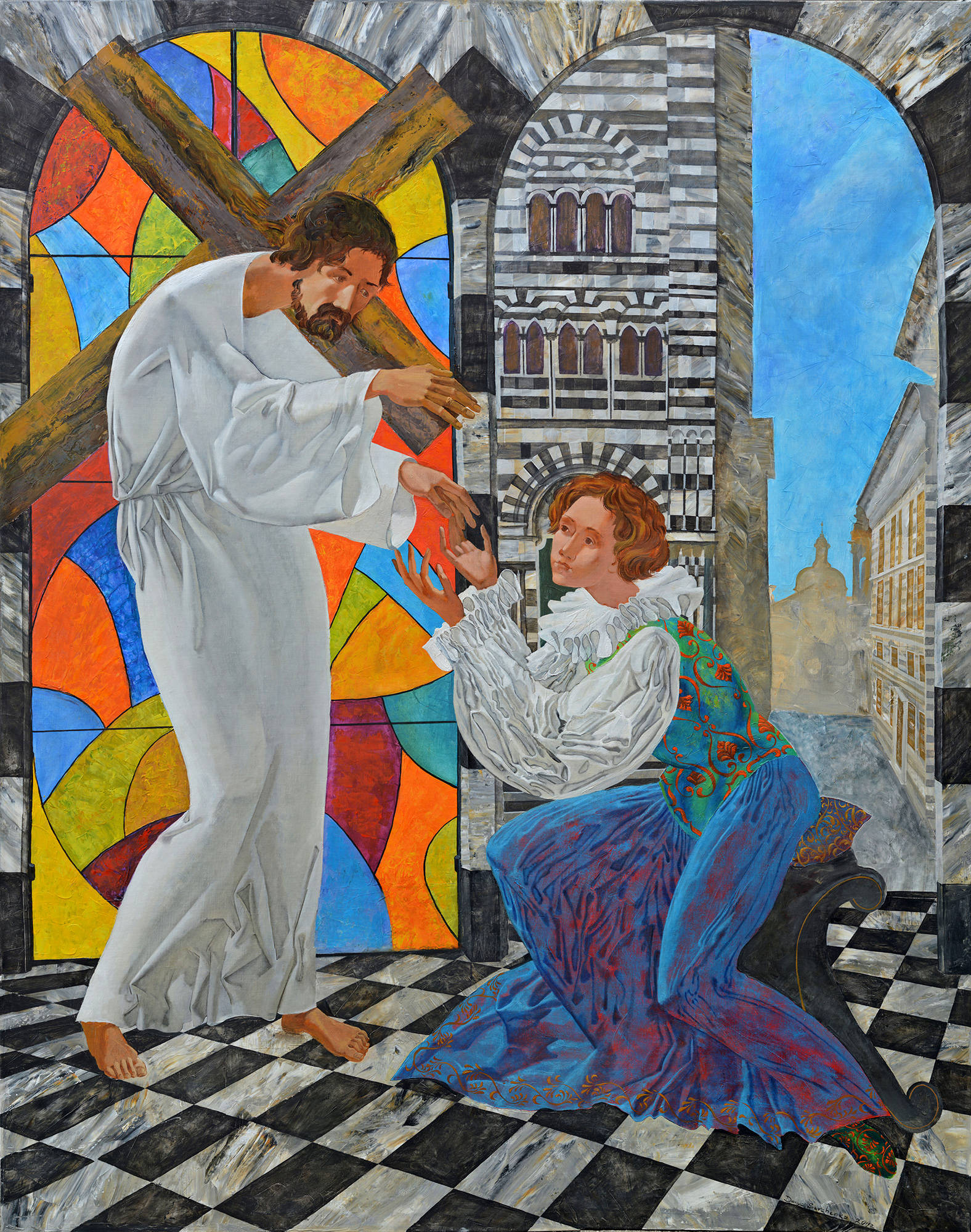
- Fresco from the Church of St. Catherine, Genoa, painted by artists Inna and Denys Savchenko

Virgin
- Born: c. 1447; Genoa, Republic of Genoa
- Died: 15 September 1510 (aged 62–63); Genoa, Republic of Genoa
- Venerated in: Catholic Church; Anglican Communion
- Beatified: 6 April 1675, Rome, Papal States by Pope Clement X
- Canonized: 16 June 1737, Rome, Papal States by Pope Clement XII
- Feast: 15 September
- Patronage: Italian hospitals

Catherine of Genoa (born Caterina Fieschi Adorno; 1447 – 15 September 1510) was an Italian saint and mystic, known for her work among the sick and the poor and remembered because of various writings describing both these actions and her mystical experiences. She was a member of the noble Fieschi family, and spent most of her life and her means serving the sick, especially during the plague which ravaged Genoa in 1497 and 1501. She died in that city in 1510.

Her fame outside her native city is connected with the publication in 1551 of the book known in English as the Life and Doctrine of Saint Catherine of Genoa.

Catherine and her teaching were the subject of Baron Friedrich von Hügel's classic work The Mystical Element of Religion (1908).

== Early life ==
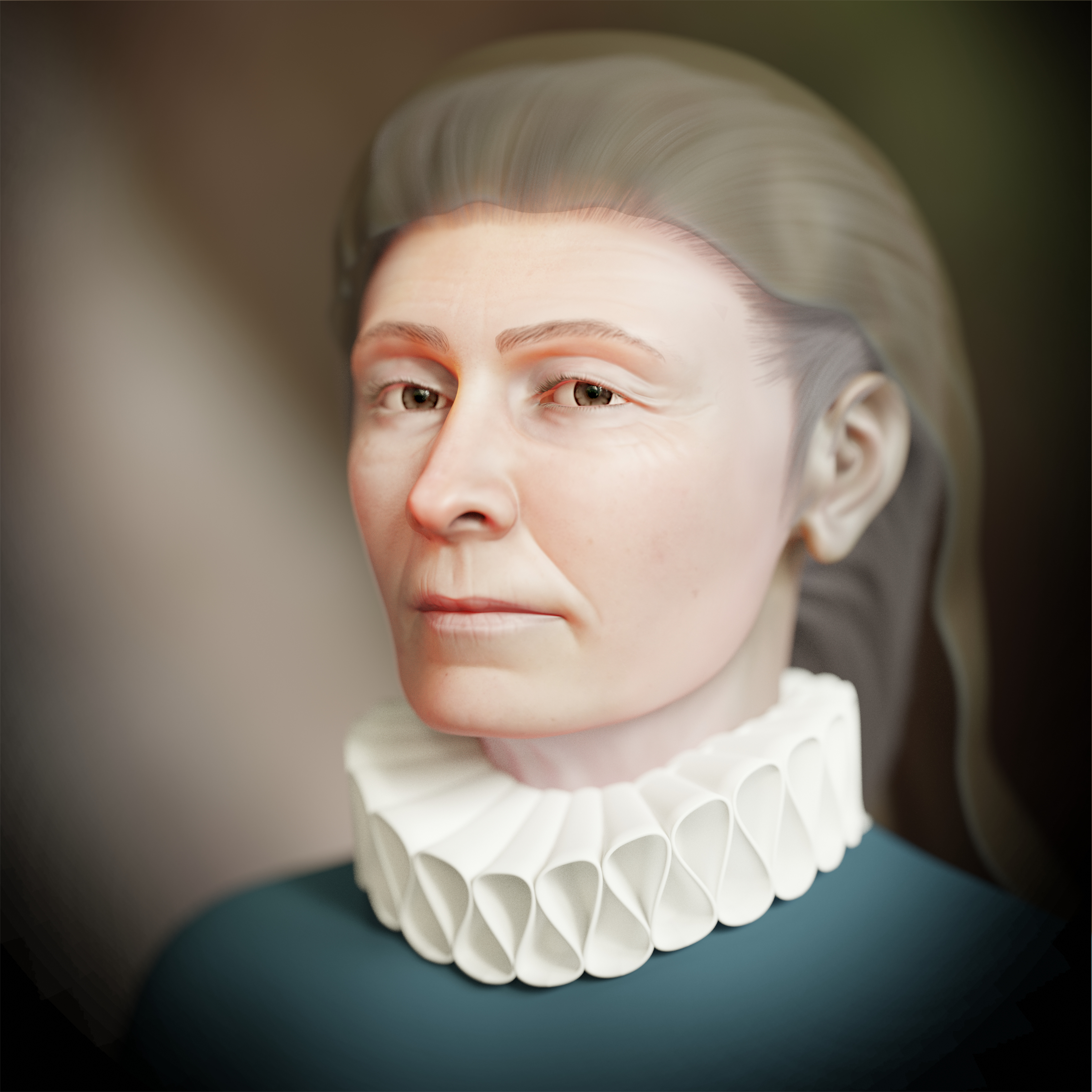
Forensic facial reconstruction of St. Catherine of Genoa

Catherine was born 1447 into the House of Fieschi of Genoa. She was the last of five children. Her parents were Jacopo Fieschi and Francesca di Negro. Jacopo became Viceroy of Naples. The House of Fieschi were connected to two popes (Innocent IV and Adrian V) and 72 cardinals.

Catherine wished to enter a convent when about 13, perhaps inspired by her sister Limbania who was an Augustinian nun. However, the nuns to whom her confessor applied on her behalf refused her on account of her youth. After this Catherine appears to have put the idea aside without any further attempt.

After her father's death in 1463, aged 16, Catherine was married by her parents' wish to a young Genoese nobleman, Giuliano Adorno, a man who, after several experiences in the area of trade and in the military world in the Middle East, had returned to Genoa to get married. Their marriage was probably a ploy to end the feud between their two families. The marriage turned out wretchedly: it was childless, and Giuliano proved to be a faithless, violent-tempered husband. He was also a spendthrift and he made life miserable for his wife. Details are scant, but it seems at least clear that Catherine spent the first five years of her marriage in silent, melancholy submission to her husband and then, for another five years, she turned to the world for consolation in her troubles. Then, after ten years of marriage, desperate for an escape, she prayed for three months that God would keep her sick in bed, but her prayer went unanswered.

== Conversion ==
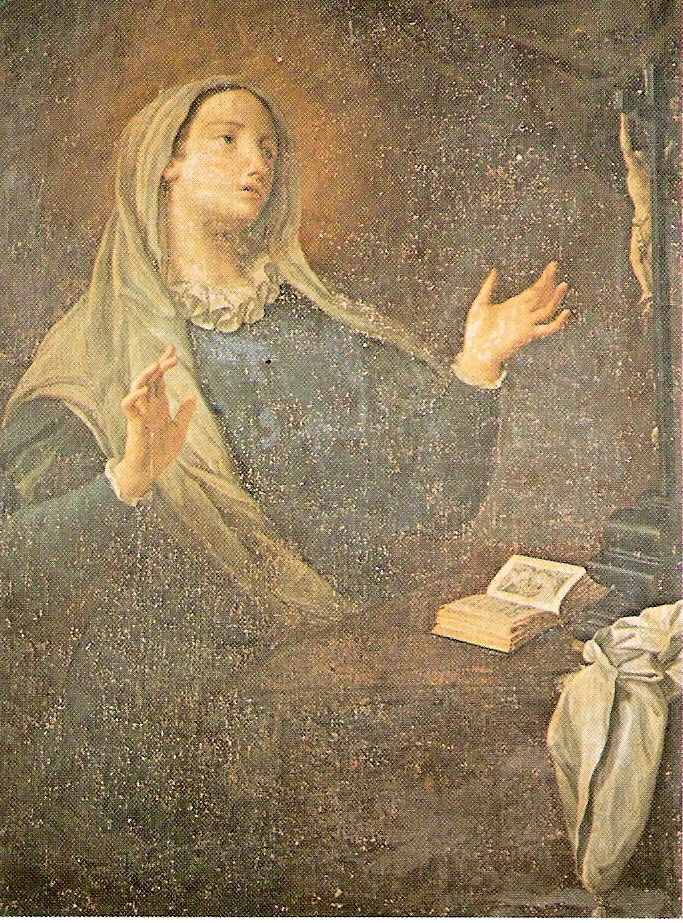
Painting by Giovanni Agostino Ratti

After ten years of marriage, she was converted by a mystical experience during confession on 22 March 1473; her conversion is described as an overpowering sense of God's love for her. After this revelation occurred she abruptly left the church without finishing her confession. This marked the beginning of her life of close union with God through prayer without using forms of prayer such as the rosary. She began to receive Communion almost daily, a practice extremely rare for lay people in the Middle Ages, and she underwent remarkable mental and at times almost pathological experiences, the subject of Friedrich von Hügel's study The Mystical Element of Religion.

She combined this with unselfish service to the sick in a hospital at Genoa, in which her husband joined her after he, too, had been converted. He later became a Franciscan tertiary, but she joined no religious order. Her husband's spending had ruined them financially. He and Catherine decided to live in the Hospital of Pammatone and to dedicate themselves to works of charity there. She eventually became manager and treasurer of the hospital.

She died on 15 September 1510, worn out with labours of body and soul. Her death had been slow with many days of pain and suffering as she experienced visions and wavered between life and death.

== Spiritual teaching ==
For about 25 years, Catherine, though frequently going to confession, was unable to open her mind for direction to anyone; but towards the end of her life a Father Marabotti was appointed to be her spiritual guide. He had been a director of the hospital where her husband died in 1497. To him she explained her states, past and present, and he compiled the Memoirs. During this period, her life was devoted to her relationship with God, through "interior inspiration" alone.

In 1551, 41 years after her death, a book about her life and teaching was published, entitled Libro de la vita mirabile et dottrina santa de la Beata Caterinetta de Genoa ("Book of the marvellous life and holy teaching of the Blessed Catherine of Genoa"). This is the source of her Dialogues on the Soul and the Body and her Treatise on Purgatory, which are often printed separately. Her authorship of these has been denied, and it used to be thought that another mystic, the Augustinian canoness regular Battistina Vernazza, a nun who lived in a convent in Genoa from 1510 till her death in 1587, had edited the two works. This suggestion is now discredited by recent scholarship, which attributes a large part of both works to Catherine, even though they received their final literary form only after her death.

Catherine's thought on purgatory, for which she is particularly known, and her way of describing it, is original in some features for the period.

== Beatification and canonization ==
Catherine's writings were examined by the Holy Office and declared to contain doctrine that would alone be enough to prove her sanctity, and she was accordingly beatified in 1675 by Pope Clement X, and canonized in 1737 by Pope Clement XII. Her writings also became sources of inspiration for theologians such as Robert Bellarmine and Francis de Sales as well as Cardinal Henry Edward Manning.

Catherine of Genoa's liturgical feast is celebrated in local calendars on 15 September. Pope Pius XII declared her patroness of hospitals in Italy.

In 2022, Catherine was officially added to the Episcopal Church liturgical calendar with a feast day on 15 September.

== See also ==
- List of Catholic saints

== Modern editions ==
- Umile Bonzi, S. Caterina Fieschi Adorno, vol 1 Teologia mistica di S. Caterina da Genova, vol 2,Edizione critica dei manoscritti Cateriniani, (Genoa: Marietti, 1960, 1962). [Modern edition in Italian]
- Carpaneto da Langasco, Sommersa nella fontana dell'amore: Santa Caterina Fiescho Adorno, vol 1, La Vita, vol 2, Le opere, (Genoa: Marietti, 1987, 1990) [Modern edition in Italian]
- Catherine of Genoa, Purgation and purgatory; The spiritual dialogue, translated by Serge Hughes, Classics of Western Spirituality, (New York: Paulist Press, 1979)
- Catherine of Genoa, Treatise on purgatory; The dialogue, translated by Charlotte Balfour and Helen Douglas Irvine, (London: Sheed & Ward, 1946)
- Thomas Coswell Upham, Life of Madam Catharina Adorno, (New York: Harper, 1858)
- Mrs G Ripley, Life and Doctrine of Saint Catherine of Genoa, (New York: Christian Press Association, 1896). [This is the most recent English translation of the Life of Catherine – but is, like the 1858 translation, made from the inferior A manuscript.]
