= German Cooperative Financial Group =

Banking group in Germany

Genossenschaftliche FinanzGruppe Volksbanken Raiffeisenbanken
- Company type: Cooperative banking group
- Industry: Financial services
- Founded: 1972
- Headquarters: Berlin (BVR), Germany
- Products: Banking and financial services
- Website: bvr.de

The German Cooperative Financial Group (German: Genossenschaftliche FinanzGruppe Volksbanken Raiffeisenbanken, sometimes referred to in English as "Volksbanken Raiffeisenbanken Cooperative Financial Network") is a major and institutionalised cooperative banking network in Germany that includes local banks named Volksbanken ("people's banks") and Raiffeisenbanken ("Raiffeisen banks"), the latter in tribute to 19th-century cooperative movement pioneer Friedrich Wilhelm Raiffeisen. The Cooperative Group represents one of the three "pillars" of Germany's banking sector, the other two being, respectively, the Sparkassen-Finanzgruppe of public banks, and the commercial banking sector represented by the Association of German Banks.

The Bundesverband der Deutschen Volksbanken und Raiffeisenbanken (BVR) is the nationwide representative body of the Cooperative Financial Group. It operates under the Deutscher Genossenschafts- und Raiffeisenverband, the umbrella organization of the German cooperative movement. Most Volksbanken and Raiffeisenbanken in Germany are quite small and have thus been designated as "less significant institutions" since the entry into force of European Banking Supervision in 2014, directly supervised by the German Federal Financial Supervisory Authority (BaFin). The exceptions are DZ Bank, Münchener Hypothekenbank, and Deutsche Apotheker- und Ärztebank which are directly supervised by the European Central Bank.

== History ==
=== Founders' era ===
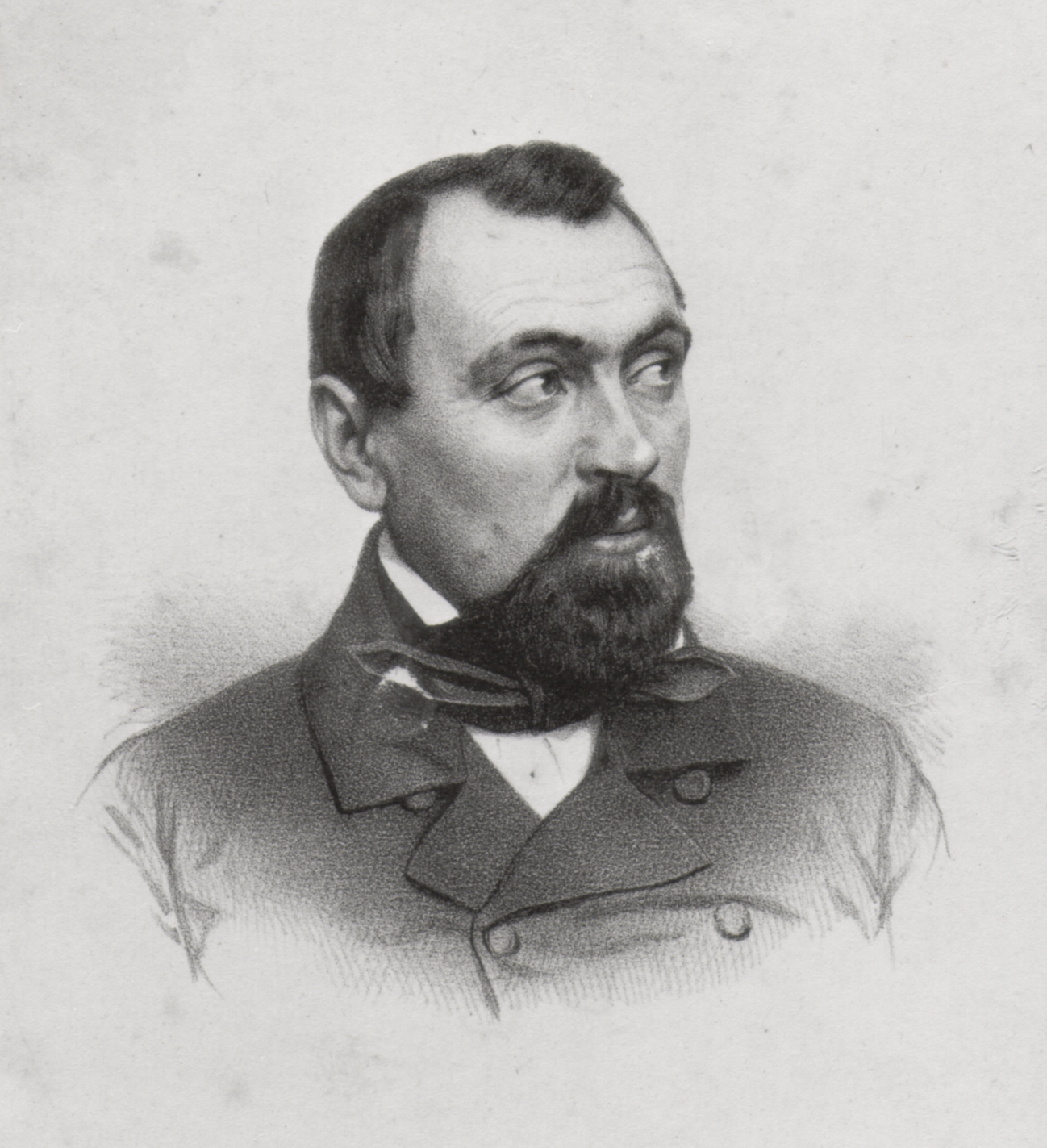
Hermann Schulze-Delitzsch (1808–1883)

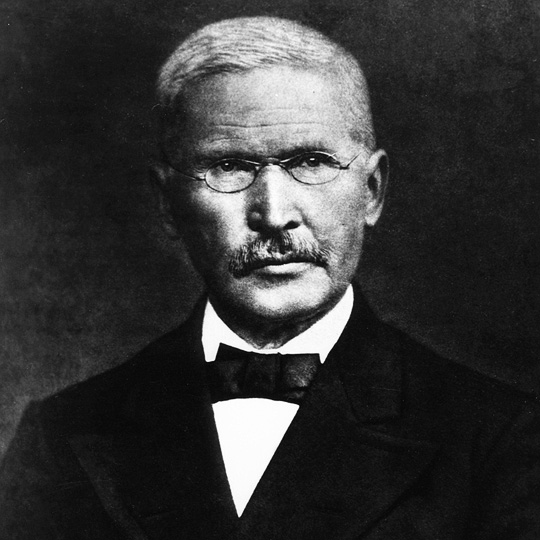
Friedrich Wilhelm Raiffeisen (1818–1888)

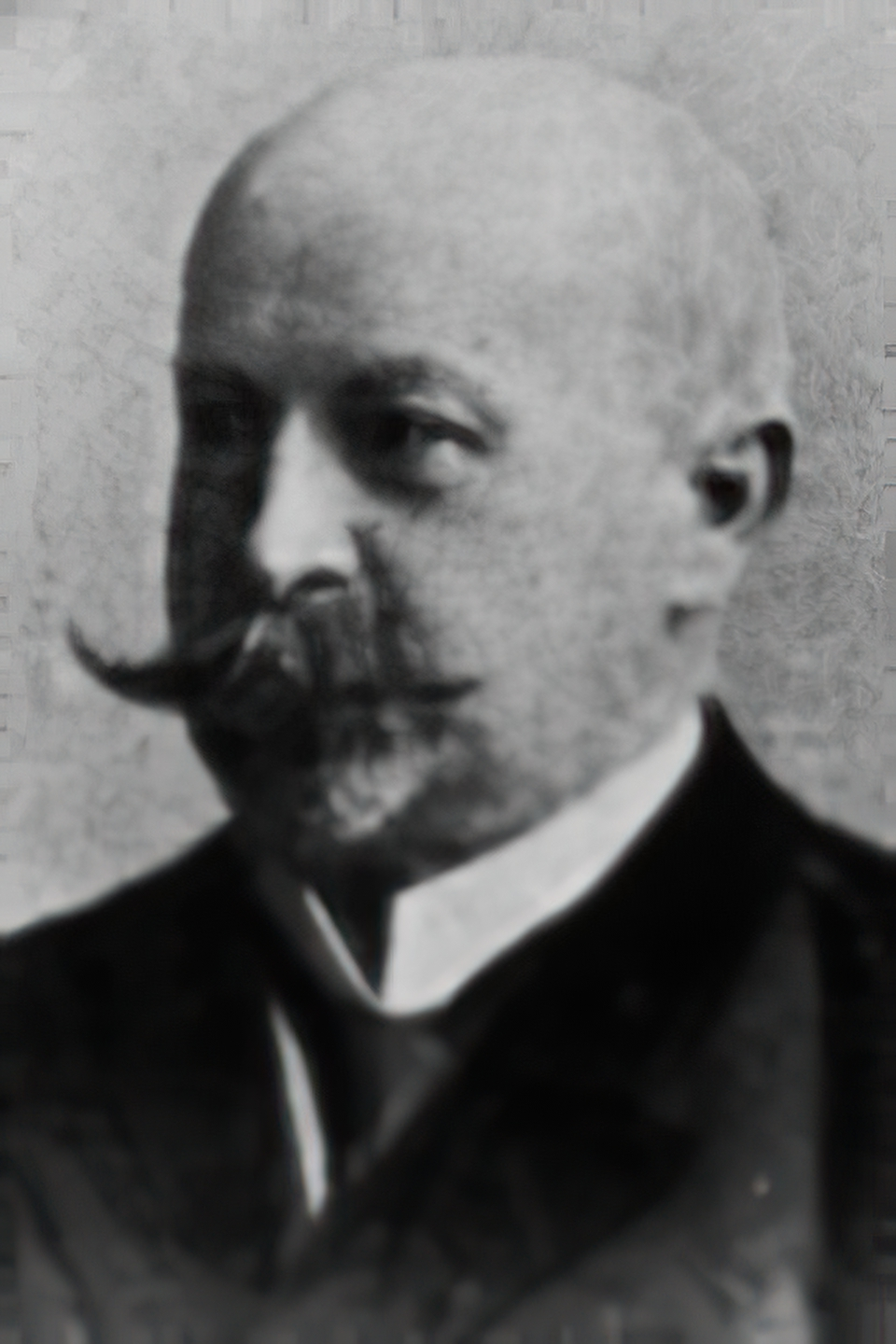
Wilhelm Haas (1839–1913)

In 1843, the first German cooperative bank was created by 50 inhabitants of Öhringen in the Kingdom of Württemberg, who named it the Öhringer Privatspar- und Leihkasse ("private savings and lending bank of Öhringen") – it still exists as the Volksbank Hohenlohe.

In the later 1840s, economist Franz Hermann Schulze-Delitzsch started organizing the creation of cooperatives by local communities of craftsmen or farmers in his home town of Delitzsch, in the Prussian Province of Saxony, and promoted national legislation to encourage it. The first such venture, a Rohstoffassoziation or raw materials purchasing association, was created by a group of shoemakers in 1849. The next year in 1850, Schulze-Delitzsch created another association for advance payments to craftsmen in Delitzsch.

In 1859, Schulze-Delitzsch convened the first group meeting of cooperatives or Genossenschaftstag in Weimar and founded a central bureau of cooperative societies (German: Centralkorrespondenzbureau), which he ran from 1861, which in 1864 became the general association of German commercial and economic cooperatives based on self-help (German: Allgemeiner Verband der auf Selbsthilfe beruhenden Deutschen Erwerbs- und Wirtschaftsgenossenschaften). Also in 1864, Schulze-Delitzsch led the creation of the bank Soergel, Parrisius & Co. in Berlin, also known as Soergelbank, to serve as central financial institution for the Allgemeiner Verband.

Meanwhile, in 1864, Friedrich Wilhelm Raiffeisen fostered the creation of the first rural cooperative bank, the Heddesdorfer Darlehnskassen-Verein ("lending association of Heddesdorf"), in the village of Heddesdorf near Neuwied, in Rhenish Prussia between Koblenz and Cologne. Raiffeisen considered joining Schulze-Delitzsch's Volksbanken initiative, but eventually concluded that the needs of rural communities were different from the ones of town craftsmen which were Schulze-Delitzsch's focus. In 1876, Raiffeisen created a financial institution in Neuwied to serve the network, which in 1926 was renamed Deutsche Raiffeisenbank AG. In 1877, he created the Bar Association of Rural Cooperatives German: Anwaltschaftsverbandes ländlicher Genossenschaften (Neuwied), the first national body for his rural cooperative movement. In 1910, that association's headquarters was relocated from Neuwied to Berlin, and in 1917 it was renamed the General Association of German Raiffeisen Cooperatives (German: Generalverband der deutschen Raiffeisengenossenschaften).

In 1872, another social reformer, Wilhelm Haas, created an agricultural purchasers’ association German: landwirtschaftlichen Konsumverein in Friedberg, Grand Duchy of Hesse. A few months later, 15 other rural purchasing cooperatives joined it to form the Association of Hessian Agricultural Purchasing Associations (German: Verband der hessischen landwirtschaftlichen Konsumvereine). In July 1883, Haas expanded his initiative into a national body, the Union of German Agricultural Cooperatives (German: Vereinigung deutscher landwirtschaftlicher Genossenschaften) in Darmstadt, which was later renamed the National Association of German Agricultural Cooperatives (German: Reichsverband der deutschen landwirtschaftlichen Genossenschaften) and moved to Berlin in 1913. Early on, the cooperatives in Haas's network in Hesse used Landwirtschaftliche Kreditbank in Frankfurt, a commercial bank, for wholesale financial services, but in 1883 they opted under Haas's leadership to create their own central institution, the Landwirtschaftliche Genossenschaftsbank AG in Darmstadt, which DZ Bank now views as its origin story. For national business, Haas's network then established a relationship with the Soergelbank in Berlin, but grew dissatisfied with it and in 1902 founded their own national financial institution, the Landwirtschaftliche Reichsgenossenschaftsbank GmbH in Darmstadt.

In 1895, the Prussian government in Berlin and its finance minister Johannes von Miquel fostered the establishment of Preussische Central-Genossenschaftskasse, also known as the Preussenkasse, to facilitate funding of local agricultural cooperative banking throughout Prussia, with capital provided by the Prussian state. Helped by new legislation on limited liability, the number of cooperative banks in Prussia doubled between 1895 and 1900.

In 1901, Karl Korthaus initiated a second network of professional cooperatives alongside the one created a half-century earlier by Schulze-Delitzsch, represented by the Hauptverbandes der deutschen Gewerblichen Genossenschaften in Osnabrück. As a consequence, there were four separate networks of cooperative banks by the start of the 20th century.

=== Restructuring and consolidation in the 20th century ===
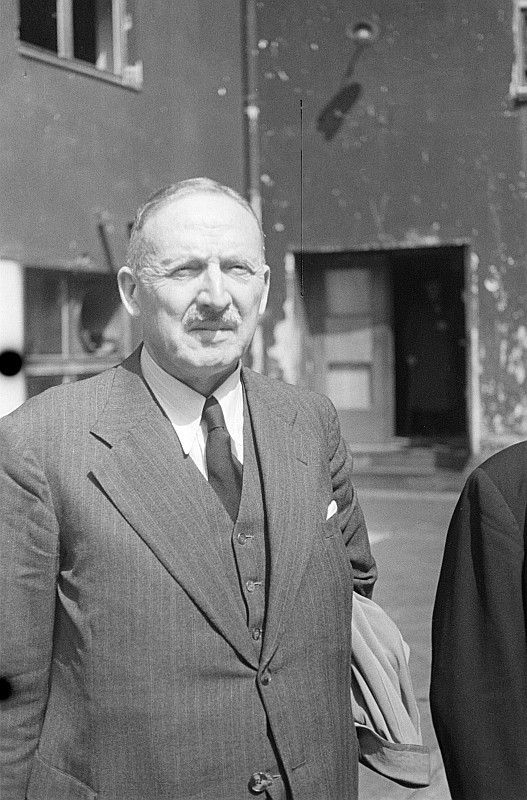
Center-right statesman Andreas Hermes (1878–1964) was President of the Raiffeisen Reichsverband from 1930 to 1933, and participated in the cooperative group's postwar reorganization in West Germany.

In the late 19th century, the Soergelbank was criticized by Volksbanken for its commercialism and largely unsuccessful business expansion outside of the cooperative space. In 1904, its losses led it to merge into Dresdner Bank, which set up specialized departments in Berlin and Frankfurt to serve its cooperative clientele. In subsequent years, Haas's Landwirtschaftliche Reichsgenossenschaftsbank in turn went into distress and eventually an orderly liquidation in 1912, and the Landwirtschaftliche Genossenschaftsbank met the same fate in 1913. The Hessian cooperatives created a new institution, the Zentralkasse der hessischen landwirtschaftlichen Genossenschaften as a substitute. In April 1920, Schulze-Delitzsch's Allgemeiner Verband and Korthaus's Hauptverbandes merged their respective organizations to form the Deutsche Genossenschaftsverband (DGV), which became the national entity for all urban professional cooperative banks.

In the later 1920s, economic hardship forced a similar merger between the two networks of agricultural cooperatives respectively founded by Raiffeisen and Haas, which on 1929 formed the Reichsverband der deutschen landwirtschaftlichen Genossenschaften - Raiffeisen - e.V. ("e.V." stands for a registered association, German: eingetragener Verein). With around 36,000 member cooperatives and four million individual cooperators, it was the largest cooperative organization in the world. The Deutsche Raiffeisenbank AG was liquidated and substituted by regional entities of the Reichsverband. The Preussenkasse was renamed the Deutsche Zentralgenossenschaftskasse in 1932.

In 1933, like other civil society organizations, the cooperative movement became the target of the Nazi government's Gleichschaltung policy of eradicating diversity and dissent. The Reichsverband's president Andreas Hermes was swiftly arrested and replaced by Nazi Richard Walther Darré, and the Raiffeisen movement was incorporated into the Nazi agrarian movement, the Reichsnährstand. On 14 May 1934, the DGV first formalized mutual protection and deposit guarantee arrangements for its member banks, allowing the BVR to claim in 2022 that "The protection scheme run by the Cooperative Financial Network is therefore the world's oldest exclusively privately financed deposit guarantee fund for banks." In 1939, Dresdner Bank phased out its cooperative-serving operations whose business was transferred to the Zentralgenossenschaftskasse, which thus became the sole national financial institution serving the cooperative banks. During World War II, savings were directed towards investment in government bonds as part of the regime's policy of financial repression.

At the end of the war, the Zentralgenossenschaftskasse found itself in the Soviet occupation zone. In 1949, the cooperatives in West Germany created a new central institution to replace it, the Deutsche Genossenschaftskasse (DGK) in Frankfurt, with support from Hermes who had narrowly escaped execution by the Nazis in 1944 and was instrumental in reviving democratic life in the new West German environment. The DGK was located in a head office building am Taunustor 3, erected in phases in the 1950s on designs by Alfred Schild, which after 1978 was used by Commerzbank, as DGK's successor the DG Bank had moved to the nearby City-Haus high-rise, and eventually demolished in 2011 to make way for the Taunusturm development. Meanwhile, in 1948, the agricultural cooperatives in West Germany had formed the Deutscher Raiffeisenverband in Berlin as their new federal-level representative organization. In 1956, Union Investment was created in Frankfurt to provide asset management services to the Volksbanken network.

In the late 1960s, financial reform led to increased competition in the German banking sector, including with the Sparkassen, and encouraged the consideration of merger between the two national cooperative banking organizations, the Raiffeisenverband and the Deutscher Genossenschaftsverband. The negotiations were completed in 1972 with the creation of the Bundesverband der Deutschen Volksbanken und Raiffeisenbanken (BVR) in Bonn. At the same time, many local cooperatives merged, and regional organizations were consolidated. In 1975, new federal legislation redefined the role of the DGK, renamed it DG Bank, and allowed it to gradually take over the Cooperative Group's regional financial institutions. The next year, DG Bank started developing an international network, with its first offices abroad established in New York and Hong Kong. In the mid-1980s the cooperative group's regional structures in Bavaria ran into financial difficulties, and were taken over by DG Bank. This triggered a debate on the structure of the group, either with two tiers (local and federal) or three (with an intermediate regional level). In December 1989, a compromise was adopted, known as the Verbund-Konvention, which acknowledged the coexistence of two-tier and three-tier structures within the Cooperative Financial Group. In July 1990, with German reunification, DG Bank assumed the role of central financial institution for the still existing and new Kreditgenossenschaften in East Germany. In 1998, DG Bank was converted into a joint-stock company, and the cooperatives purchased the shares owned by the German federal government. In 2000, two of the remaining regional entities, Suedwestdeutsche Genossenschafts-Zentralbank AG (SGZ-Bank) in Frankfurt, a successor to the Landwirtschaftliche Genossenschaftsbank of Darmstadt, and Genossenschaftliche Zentralbank (GZB-Bank) in Stuttgart merged to form GZ-Bank.

=== 21st century developments ===
In 2001, DG Bank and GZ-Bank merged to form DZ Bank (for Deutsche Zentralgenossenschaftsbank), headquartered in Frankfurt. In 2016, DZ Bank in turn absorbed WGZ Bank (Westdeutsche Genossenschafts-Zentralbank) of Düsseldorf, thus completing the Cooperative Group's transformation into a two-tier structure that had started in the 1980s.

On 13 January 2013, robbers stole goods from 100 private safe deposit boxes located in Steglitz, Berlin. In the official statement the police said that bank security officer noticed smoke coming from the deposit room on Monday morning (January 14). Next they found broken deposit boxes and a 30 m tunnel, the digging of which probably took a couple of weeks or even months. The tunnel (external pictures) was reportedly so well constructed that it had ceiling supports and was about 3 feet wide. It connected the bank deposit and a nearby underground parking lot. Probably nobody noticed anything, because the parking lot was shielded by roulettes, and people thought that this part was under repair. There are some similarities between this robbery and the Baker Street robbery in London.

In 2024 it became public knowledge, that the Federal Financial Supervisory Authority had criticized the Düsseldorf-Neuss branch of the Volksbank for insufficient measures against money laundering. The company GIC International, allegedly founded in 2012 by the Iranian Ghadir holding, an entity of the regime in Iran, and sanctioned by the United States, did business with the Volksbank. Journalists had uncovered communication of GIC and Ghadir personnel as late as 2022. In 2024 the same Volksbank was conned by a former accountant of the French Kiabi fashion group to transfer Euro 100 million of Kiabi's money to an account in Turkey. As a result, Kiabi requested the money back from the Volksbank Düsseldorf-Neuss and the Financial Supervisory Authority replaced the management in November with a special representative.

In early 2025 the Financial Supervisory Authority banned the "Raiffeisenbank im Hochtaunus eG" in Bad Homburg from granting loans. The bank had opened an online banking service in 2022 and had aggressively advertised for new customers. After press research, a combination of defaulted loans, Equity ratio and structural risks prompted the Supervisory Authority to intervene.

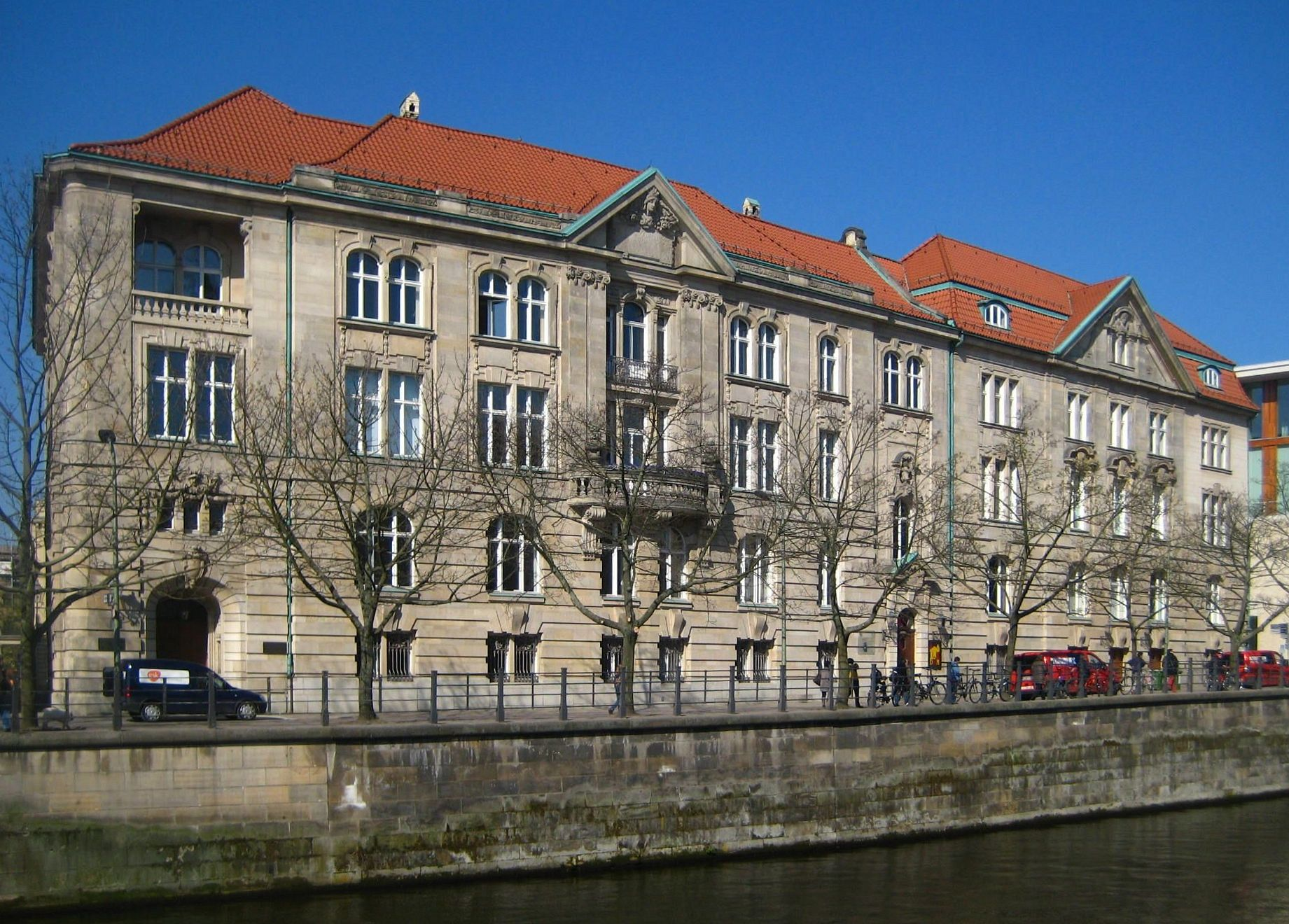
Building Am Zeughaus 2 in Berlin (right), from 1899 seat of the Preussenkasse, and 1906 extension on Am Zeughaus 1 (left); now offices of the Deutsches Historisches Museum

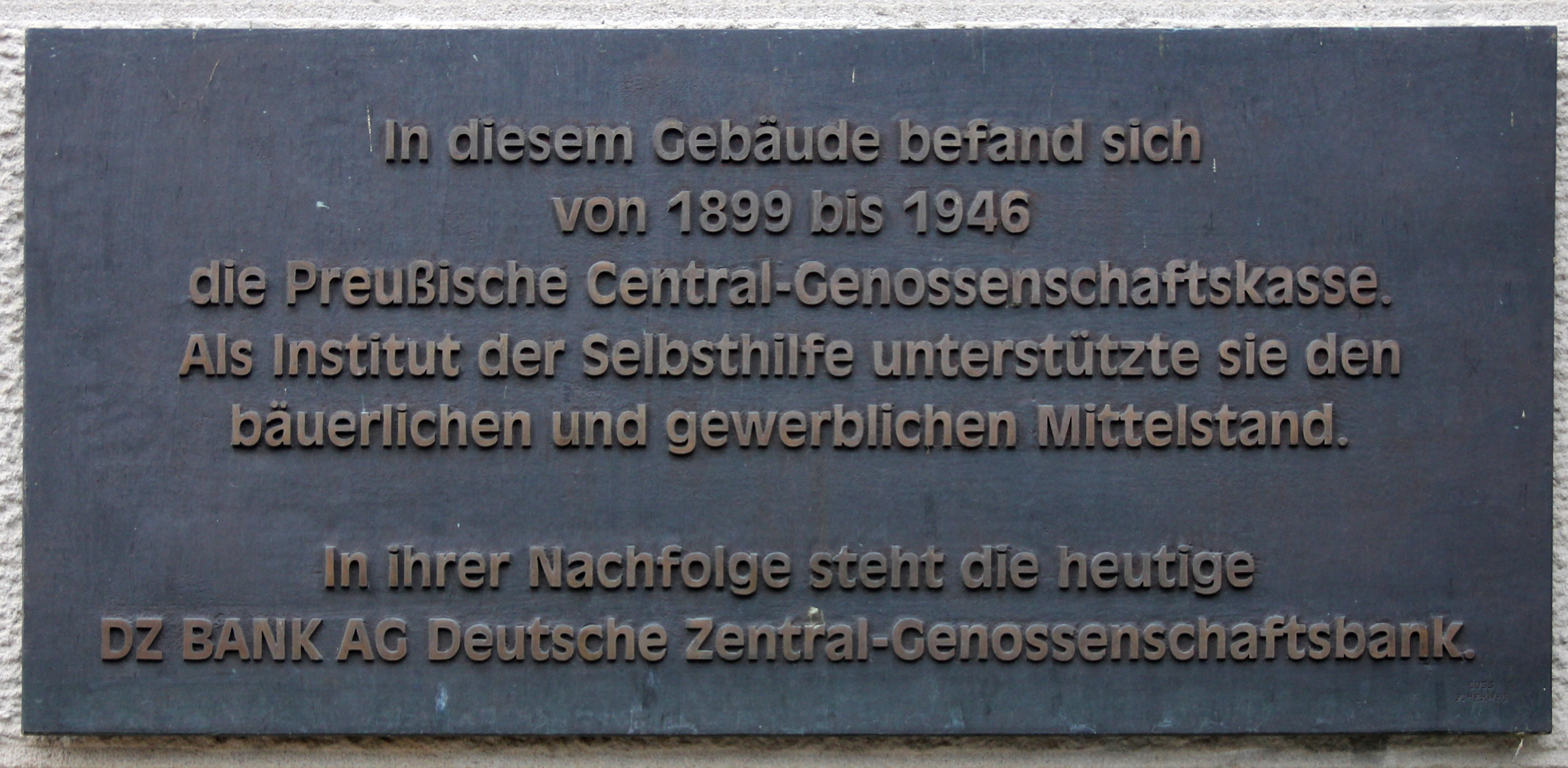
Plaque on the building Am Zeughaus 2

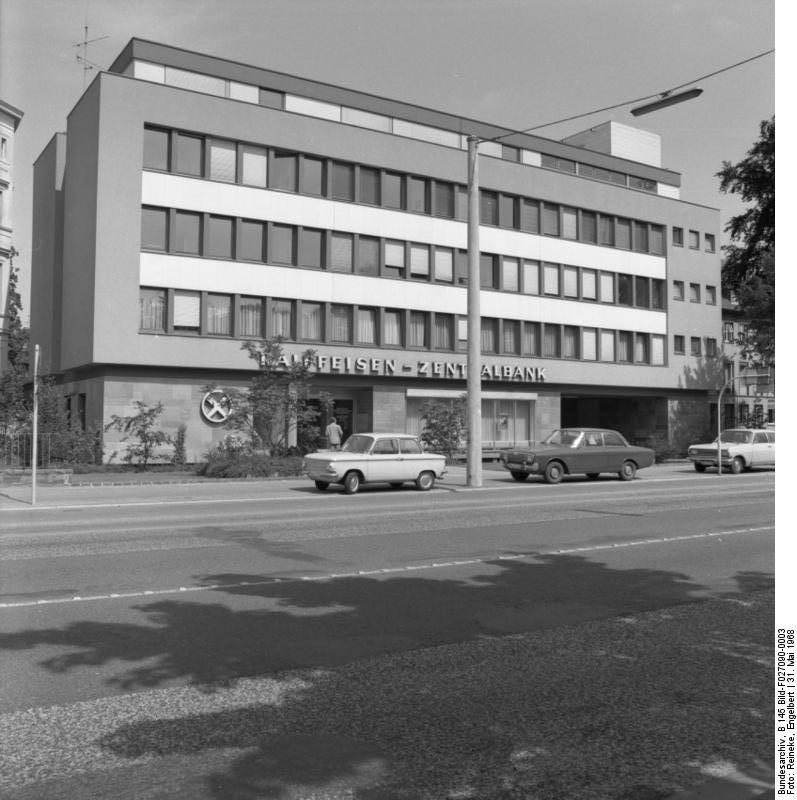
Regional Zentralbank in Bonn, Adenauerallee 121, photographed in 1968; now Bonn office of the Deutscher Genossenschafts- und Raiffeisenverband (DGRV)

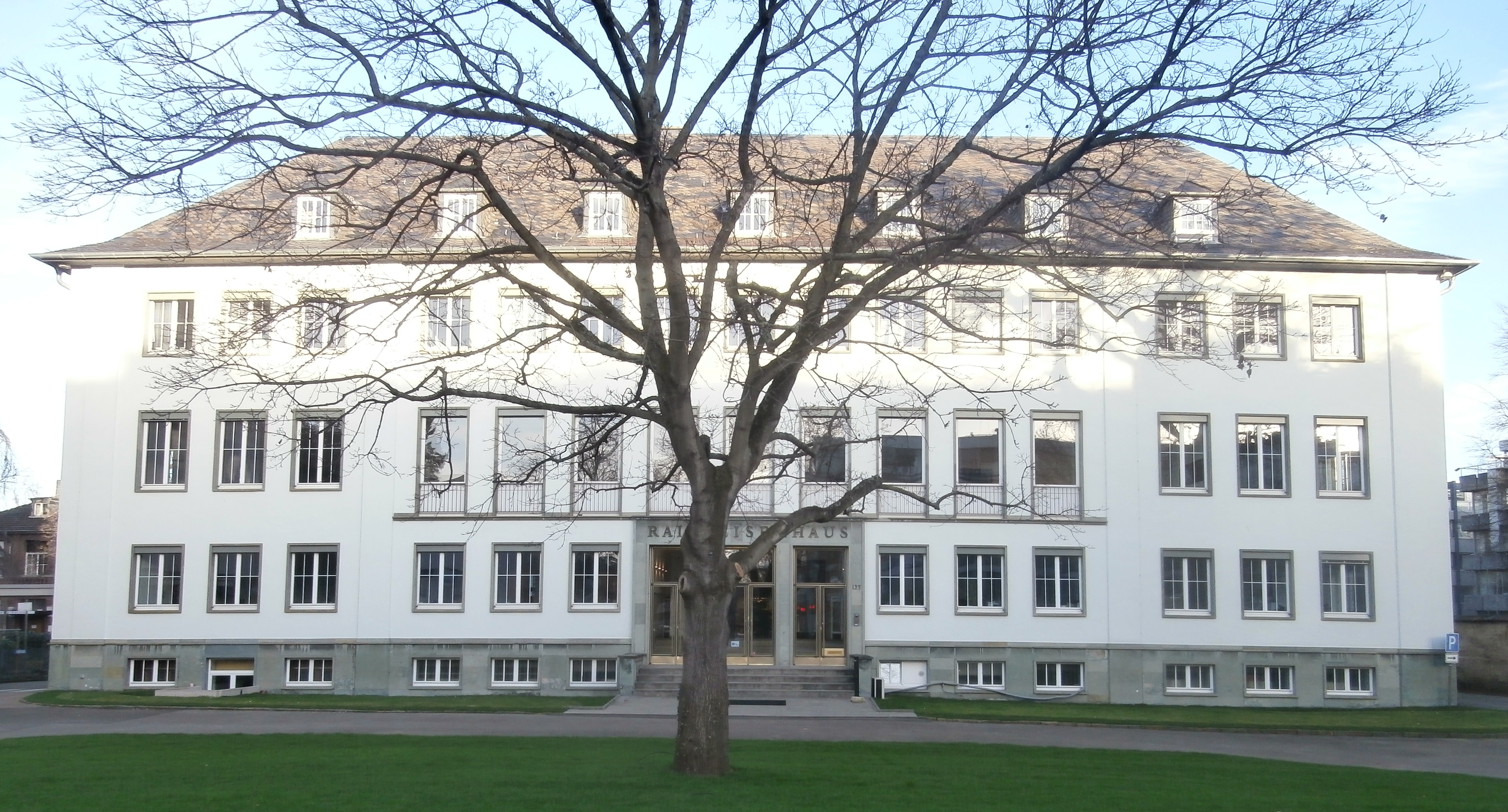
Raiffeisenhaus in Bonn, Adenauerallee 127, next to the previous building and a stone's throw from the former Federal Chancellery, former head office (and now Bonn office) of the Deutscher Raiffeisenverband

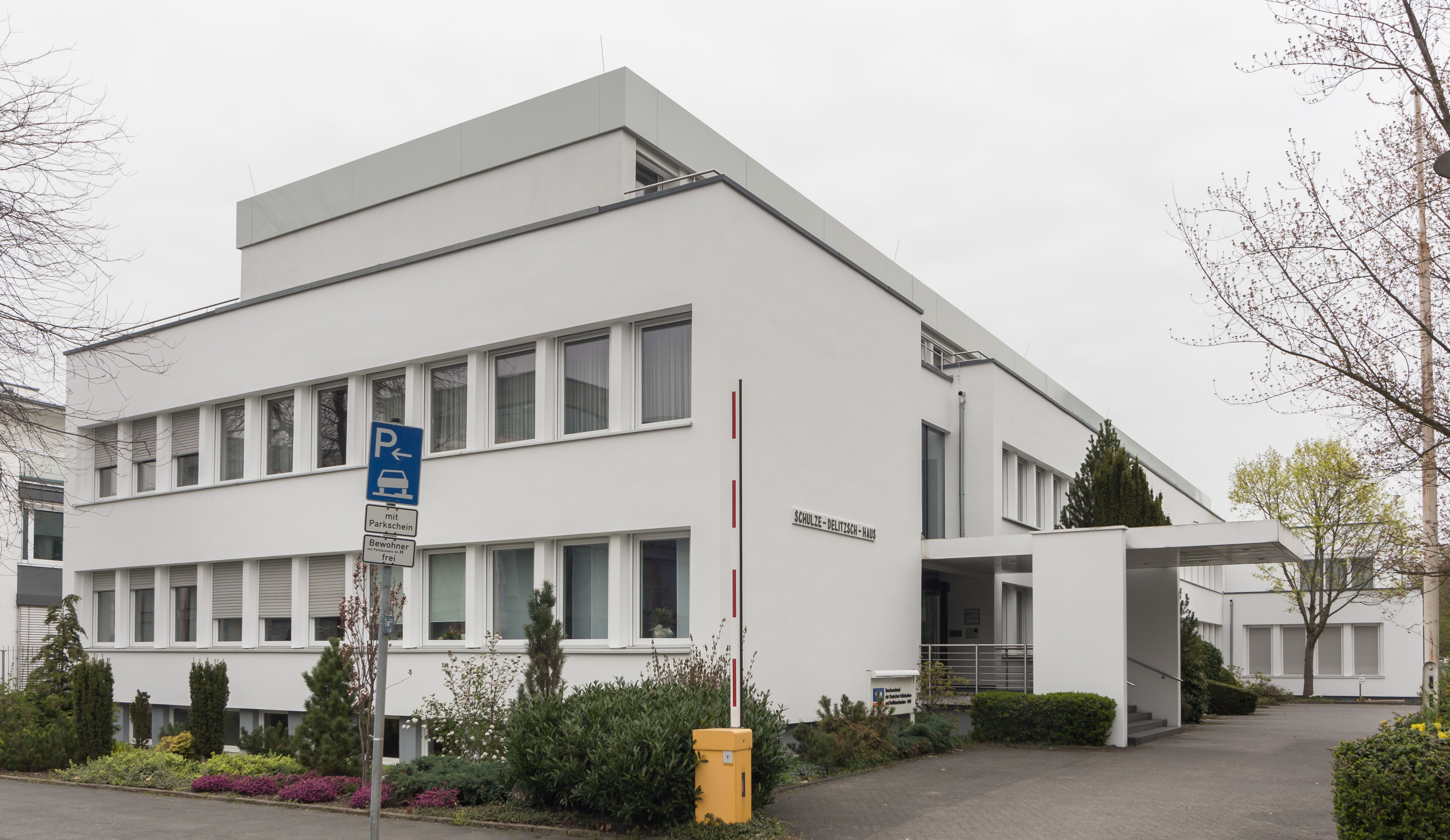
Schulze-Delitzsch-Haus (Bonn), former seat of the Deutscher Genossenschaftsverband and now Bonn office of the BVR

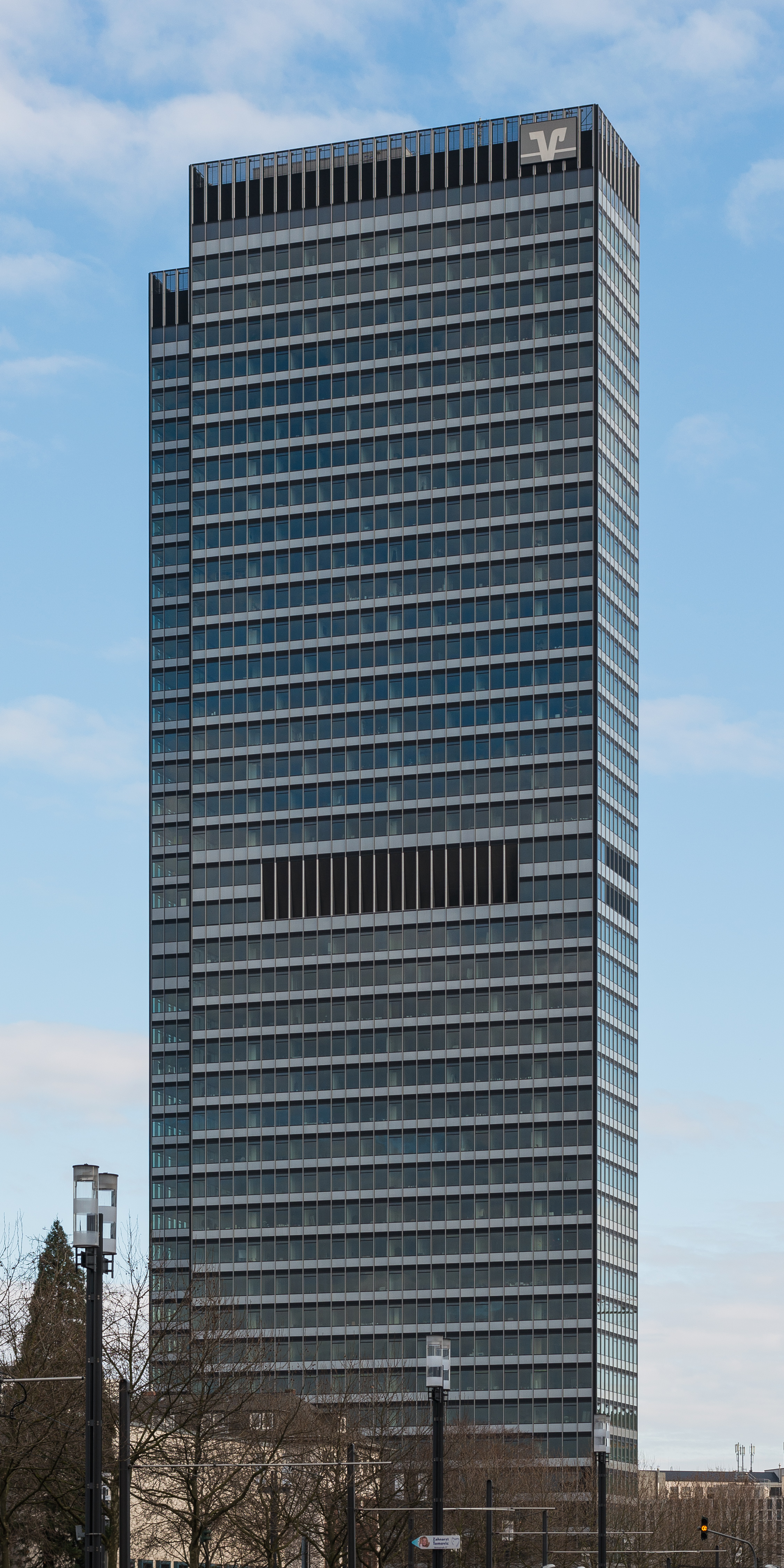
City-Haus in Frankfurt, head office of DG Bank (1976–1993) and still part of the DZ Bank head office complex

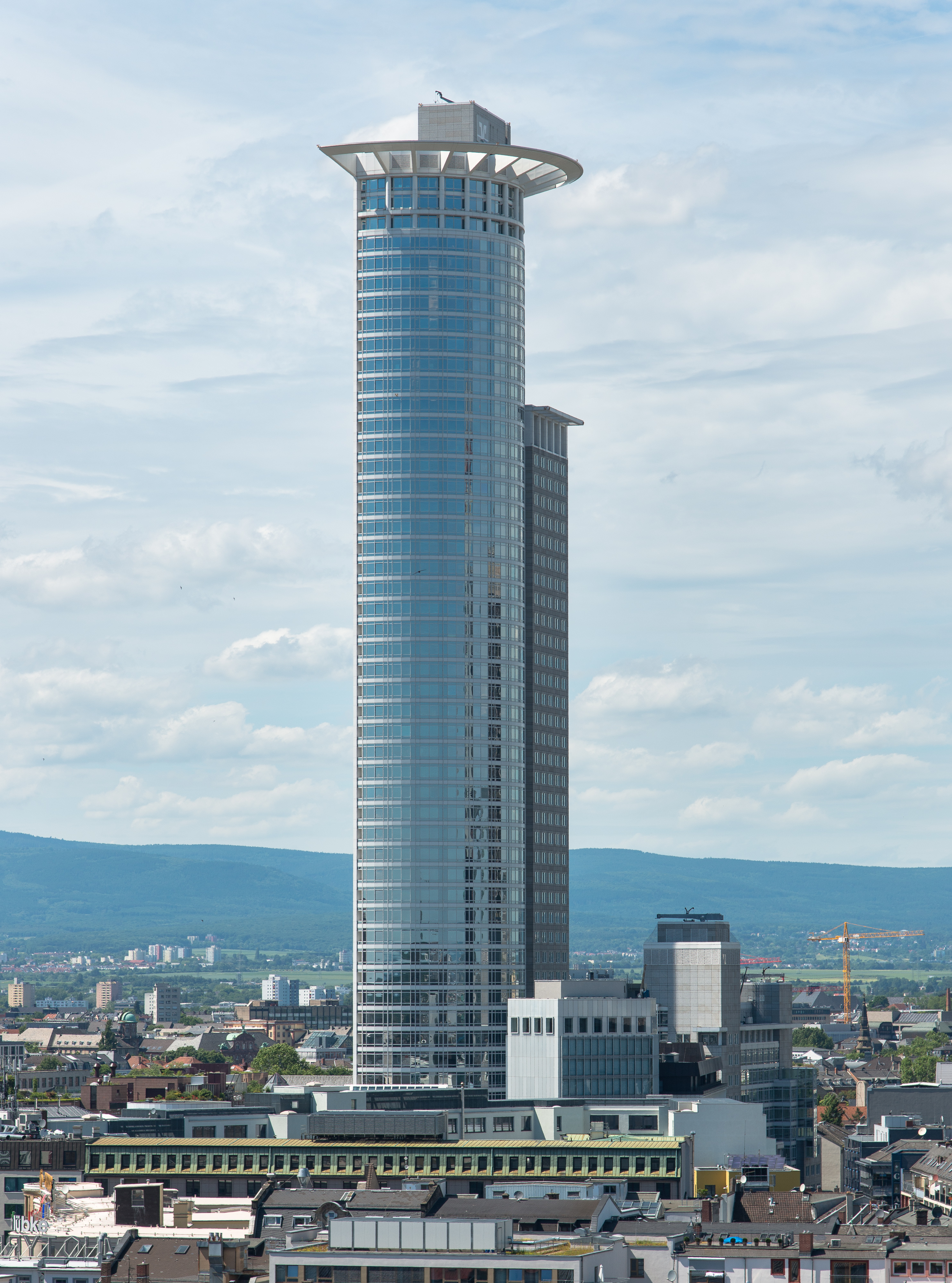
Westendstrasse 1, head office of DG Bank (1993–2001) then of DZ Bank in Frankfurt, designed by Kohn Pedersen Fox

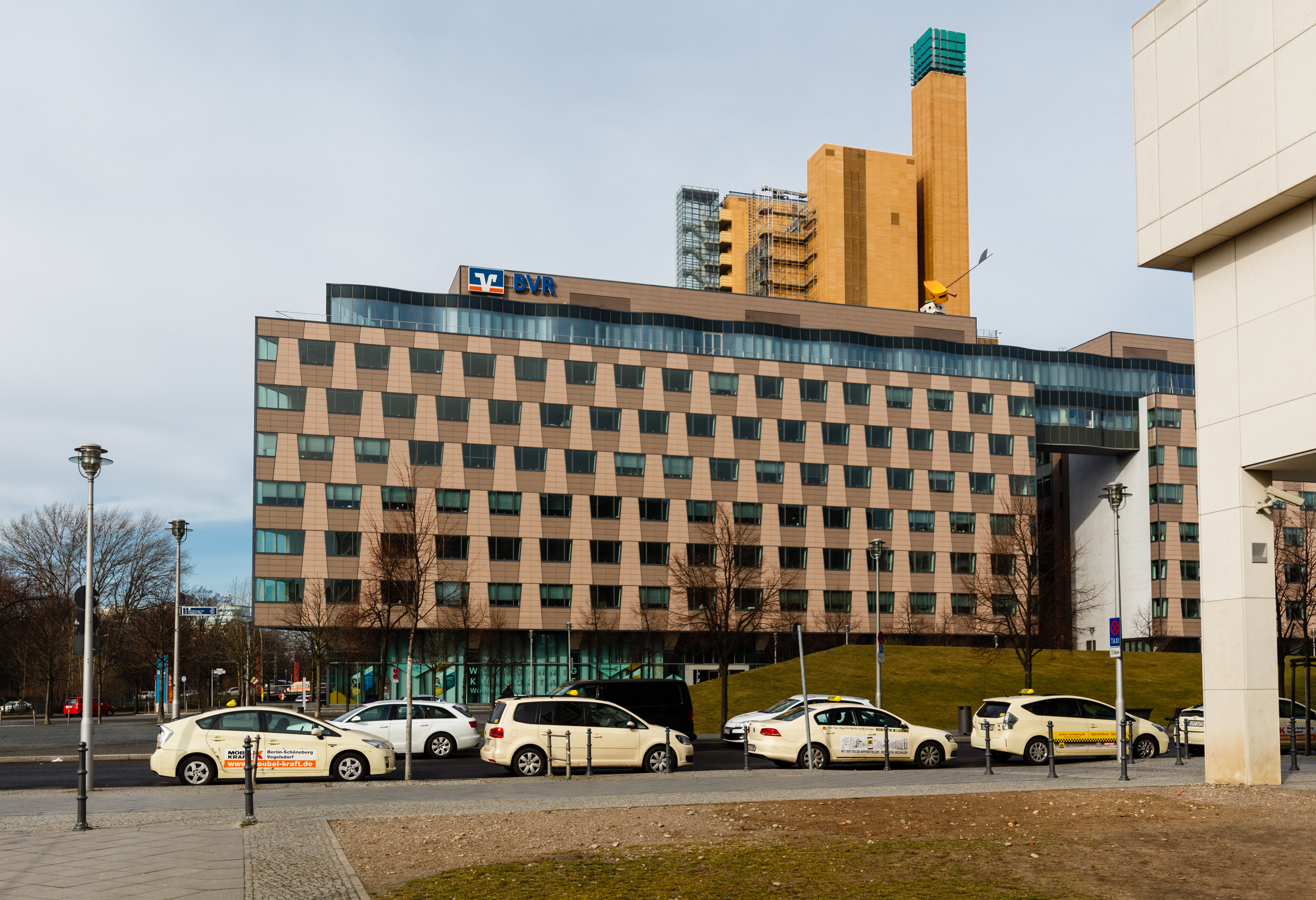
Building at Schellingstrasse 4 in Berlin, designed by Arata Isozaki and completed in 1997; current head office of the BVR and of the DGRV

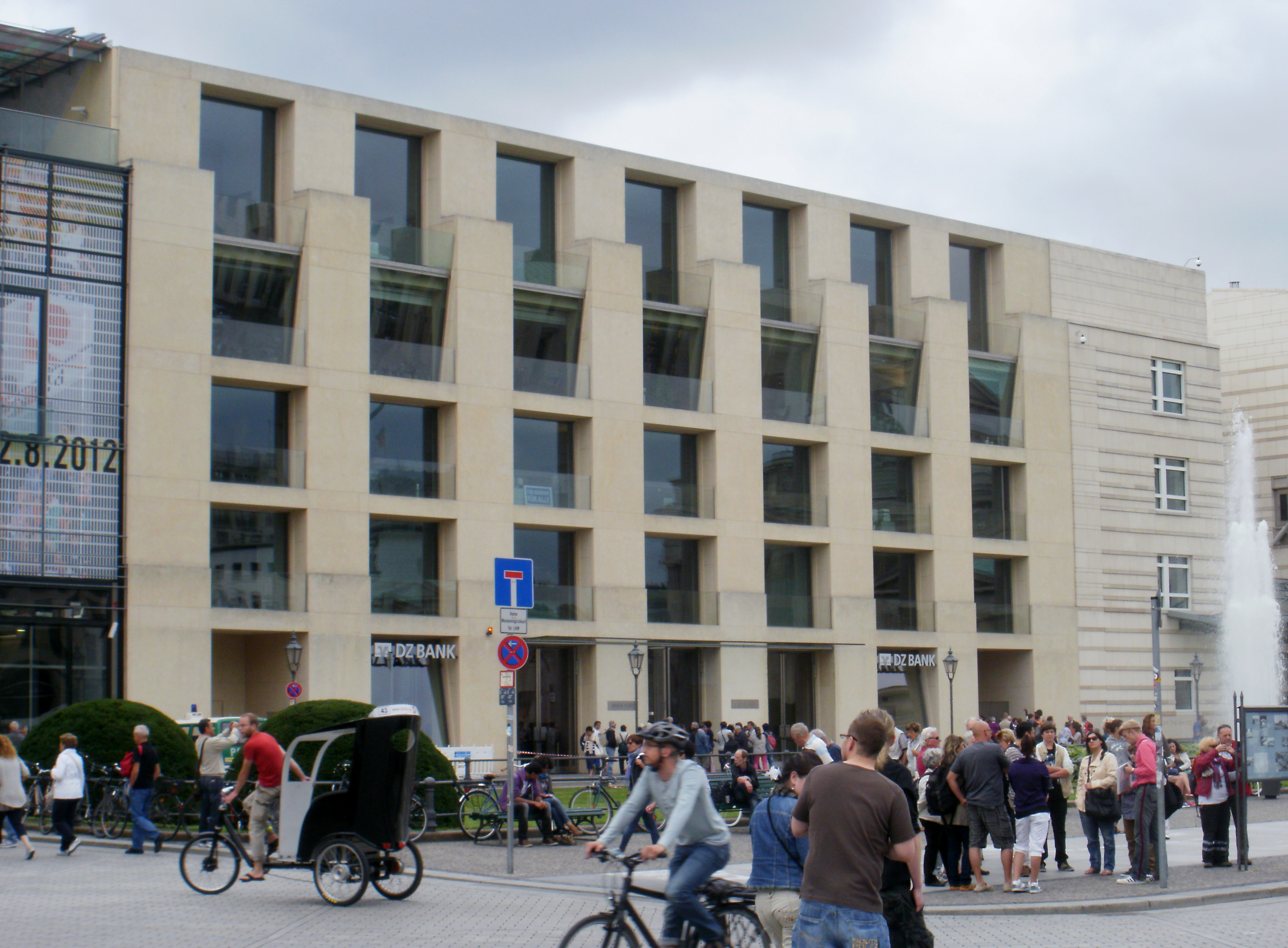
DZ Bank building on Pariser Platz, initially DG Bank's Berlin office designed by Frank Gehry and completed in 2000

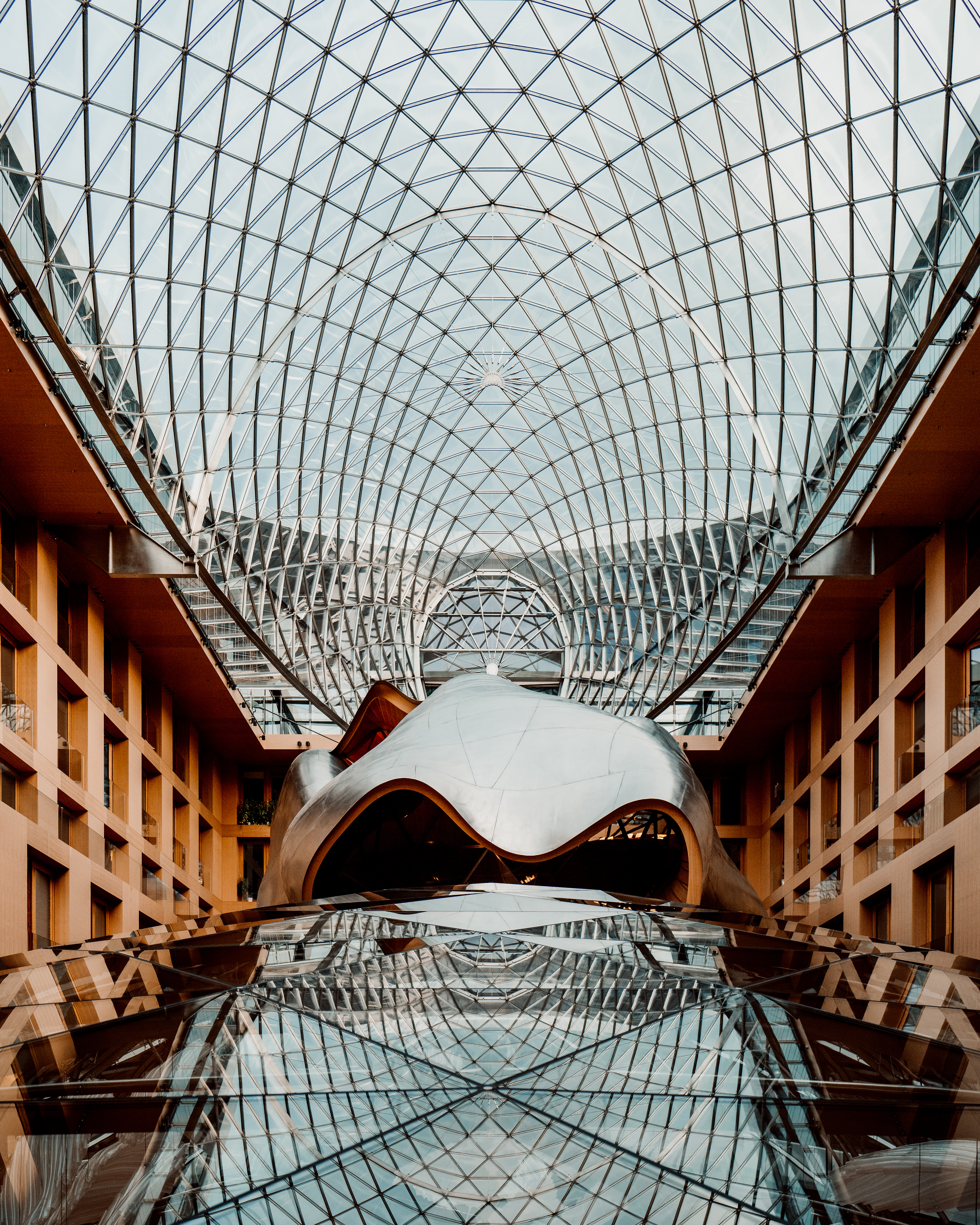
Atrium inside the DZ Bank building in Berlin

== Group structure and operations ==
The Cooperative Group's entities, which are also directly or indirectly member institutions of the BVR, include:

- hundreds of local cooperative banks generally called Genossenschaftsbank ("cooperative bank"), Volksbank ("people's bank"), Vereinigte Volksbank ("united people's bank"), Raiffeisenbank, Raiffeisen-Volksbank or Volksbank Raiffeisenbank or VR Bank;
- 14 PSD Banks, cooperative banks whose name is an acronym for "post, savings and loan associations" (German: Post-, Spar- und Darlehnsvereine);
- 11 Sparda-Banks, cooperative banks whose name is a portmanteau also referring to savings and loans (German: Sparen und Darlehen);
- several church cooperative banks: Liga Bank in Regensburg, DKM Darlehnskasse Münster, Bank im Bistum Essen, Bank für Kirche und Caritas in Paderborn, Pax-Bank in Cologne, Bank für Orden und Mission within Wiesbadener Volksbank, Steyler Bank in Sankt Augustin, KD-Bank in Dortmund, Evangelische Bank in Kassel, Spar- und Kreditbank Evangelisch-Freikirchlicher Gemeinden in Bad Homburg, and Spar- und Kreditbank des Bundes Freier evangelischer Gemeinden in Witten;
- Deutsche Apotheker- und Ärztebank, the cooperative banks of German physicians and pharmacists, headquartered in Düsseldorf;
- BBBank, a cooperative private banking specialist in Karlsruhe;
- Münchener Hypothekenbank in Munich.
- DZ Bank in Frankfurt, the group's central credit institution, which in turn owns cooperative mortgage banks Bausparkasse Schwäbisch Hall and DZ Hyp in Hamburg and Münster, private banker DZ Privatbank in Luxembourg, insurer R+V Versicherung in Wiesbaden, liquidity manager Teambank in Nuremberg, asset manager Union Investment in Frankfurt, financing specialist VR Smart Finanz (formerly VR Leasing) in Eschborn, and other specialized institutions.

=== Supervision ===
The entities of the Cooperative Financial Group are separately supervised, unlike other cooperative groups with similar structures such as OP Financial Group in Finland, Groupe BPCE and Crédit Mutuel in France, and Rabobank in the Netherlands, whose name also refers to Raiffeisen. As of early April 2022, DZ Bank, Deutsche Apotheker- und Ärztebank and Münchener Hypothekenbank were designated as significant institutions under European Banking Supervision and thus directly supervised by the European Central Bank (ECB), whereas the other banks within the group were supervised by BaFin under the ECB's supervisory oversight. The ECB and BaFin work together on the assessment of the Cooperative IPS.

=== Institutional Protection Scheme ===
The core financial structure of the Cooperative Financial Group is its Institutional Protection Scheme (IPS), a mutual support arrangement in accordance to Article 113(7) of the EU Capital Requirements Regulation. As of end-March 2022, the Cooperative IPS included a total of 781 entities. The entity that operates the IPS is Bundesverband der Deutschen Volksbanken und Raiffeisenbanken Sicherungseinrichtung, also known as BVR-SE.

As with the Sparkassen-Finanzgruppe, the interventions of the Cooperative Group IPS are generally not made public. The International Monetary Fund disclosed in 2016 that the IPS had provided support to member banks in two cases in 2011, for a total intervention amount of €114 million, and again in 2013 and 2014 for €11 million in each case.

=== Deposit insurance ===
As a consequence of the EU Deposit Guarantee Scheme Directive (DGSD) and the broader policy of European Banking union, the BVR has set up a statutory deposit insurance scheme, in addition to its pre-existing IPS and operated by a separate legal entity, BVR Institutssicherung GmbH (BVR-ISG). BVR-ISG is recognized as a deposit guarantee scheme under DGSD; it operates alongside the IPS and in coordination with it, with a liability arrangement that ensures that the IPS funds are readily available to BVR-ISG.

The membership of BVR-ISG is identical to that of the IPS entity BVR-SE and to that of the BVR itself.

=== Accounting ===
The BVR publishes consolidated financial statements of the Cooperative Financial Group, in line with the reporting requirements for institutional protection schemes set out in Article 113(7)(e) of the EU Capital Requirements Regulation. These financial statements are prepared in line with International Financial Reporting Standards. They are not reviewed by an external auditor. Separately, DZ Bank publishes audited consolidated financial statements.

=== International activities ===
The Cooperative Financial Group's operations are predominantly domestic in Germany. Even for the central financial institution DZ Bank, Germany represented 88.3 percent of total operating income in 2020.

=== Branding ===
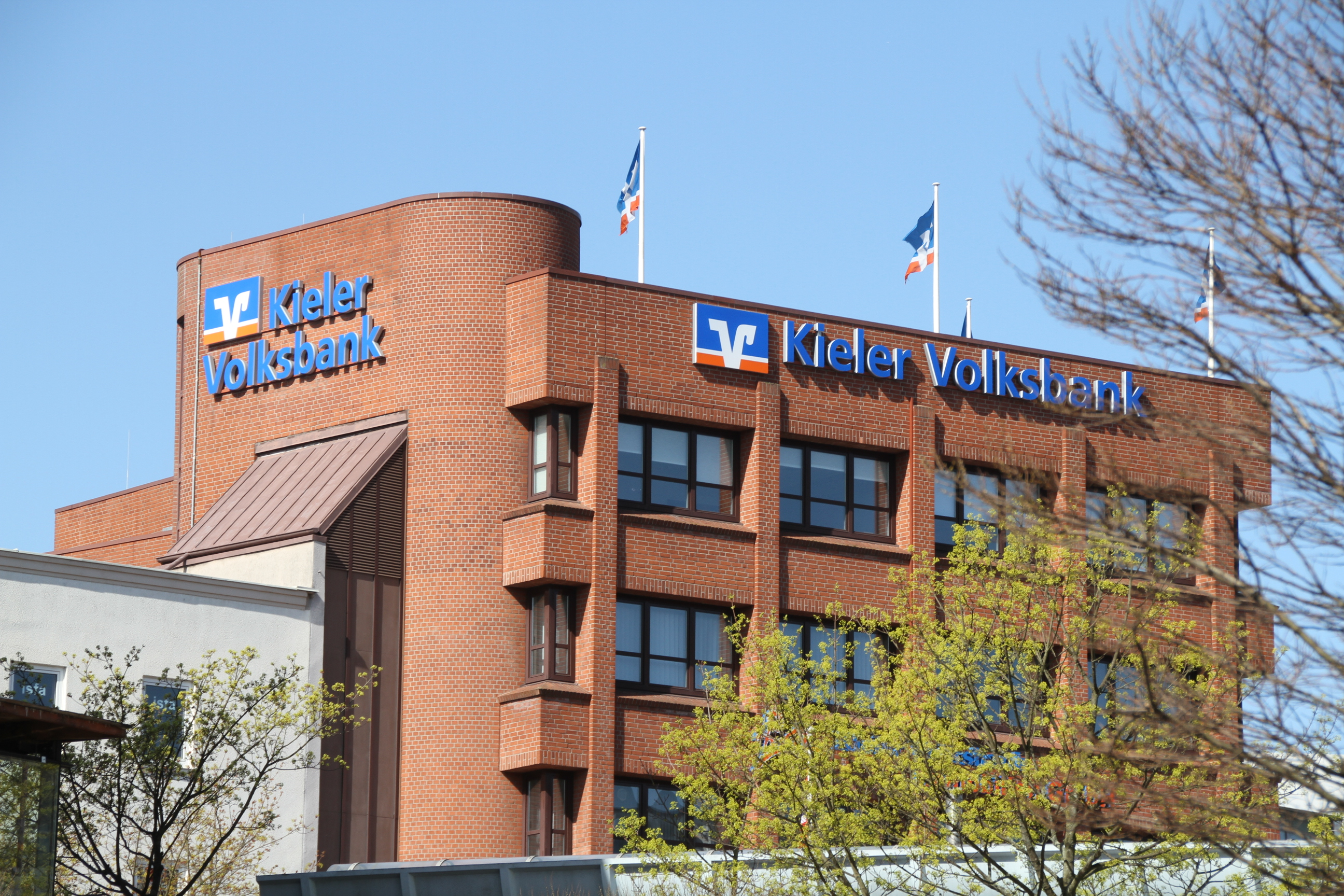
Volksbank Kiel, showing the Cooperative Financial Group's logo

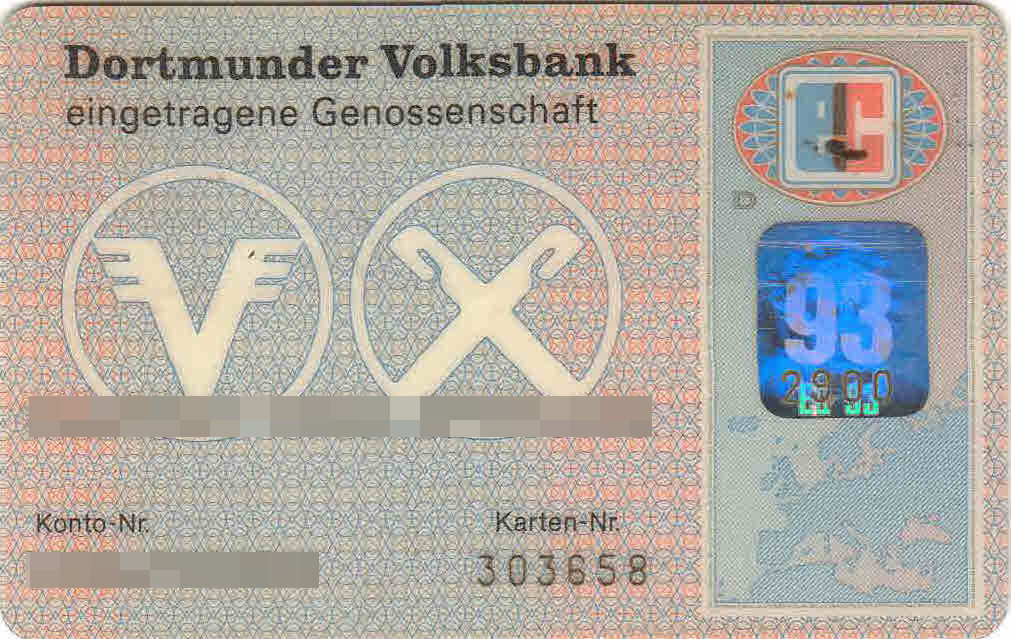
A Eurocheque guarantee card issued by Dortmunder Volksbank before 1993, showing the former Volksbanken and Raiffeisenbanken logos

Many of the group's local member banks use the Volksbank or Raiffeisenbank name or variants thereof, reflected in the abbreviations "VR" or "R+V" in the names of some of the Finanzverbund's entities. Other local banks have kept a pre-existing name that predates the constitution of the Cooperative Group as a national network.

With the increased integration of the formerly separate Volksbanken and Raiffeisenbanken networks, the Cooperative Group has created a blue-orange color code that blends features of the two previous logos, respectively a stylized "V" and a house gable motif with sculpted horseheads, the latter already present during Raiffeisen's lifetime. The new logo has been adopted by most of the group's cooperative member banks, with few exceptions such as Bausparkasse Schwäbisch Hall which has kept its historic red-yellow logo.

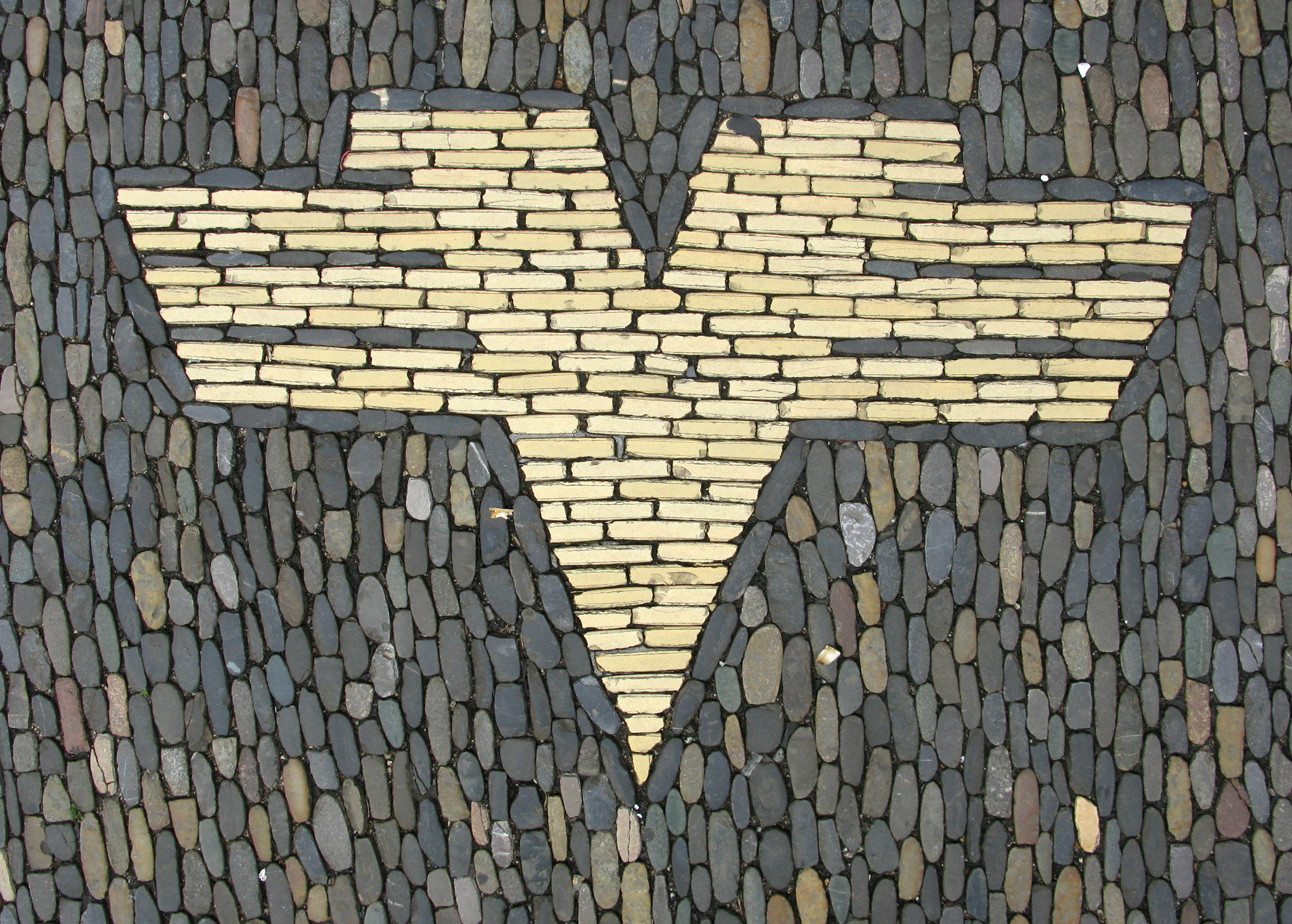
Former logo of the Volksbanken, displayed on a pavement in Freiburg im Breisgau

Former Raiffeisen logo with the house gable motif

Logo of Bausparkasse Schwäbisch Hall

=== National representation ===
The Bundesverband der Deutschen Volksbanken und Raiffeisenbanken (BVR) represents the Cooperative Financial Group nationally and before European institutions.

== See also ==
- List of co-operative banks in Germany
- List of European cooperative banks
- List of banks in Germany
