= Religious banking =

Religious banking may refer to:

- Christian finance
- Islamic banking and finance

== See also ==
- Buddhist economics
- Economics of religion
