= Frank Ulrich Montgomery =

German radiologist

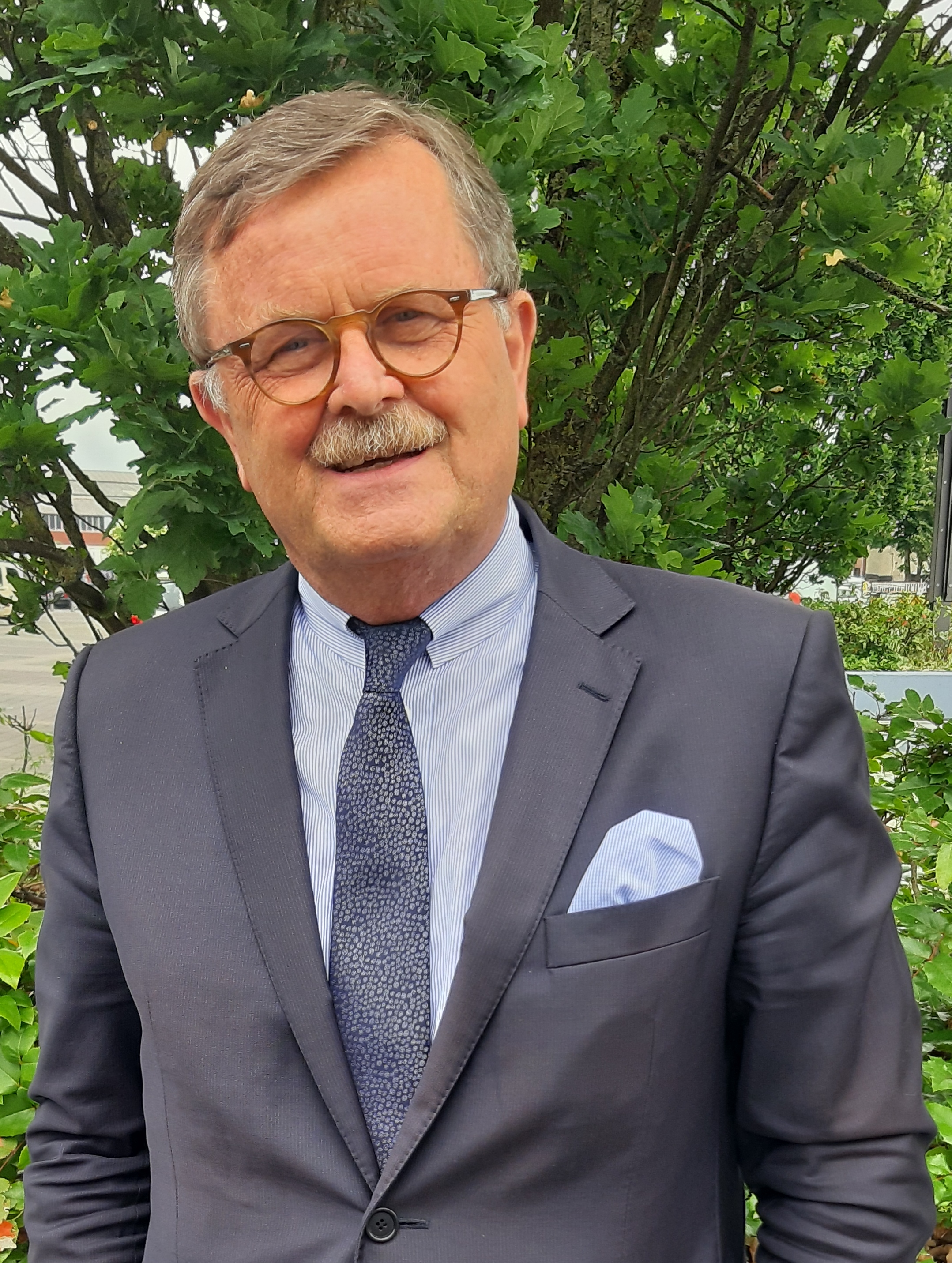
- Born: May 31, 1952 (age 74); Hamburg
- Education: University of Hamburg
- Occupation: Radiologist
- Office: Chairman of World Medical Association; President of the Standing Committee of European Doctors; Chairman of board of directors of Deutsche Apotheker- und Ärztebank

Frank Ulrich Montgomery (German: [fʁaŋk ˈʊl.ʁɪç mɔntˈgɔ.mə.ʁi], born 31 May 1952) is a German radiologist. From 1989 to 2007 he held the office of chairman of the German physicians' union Marburger Bund, and was named honorary chairman in 2007. In the same year, he was appointed vice president of the German Medical Association. He was the latter's president from 2011 to 2019. In 2015, Montgomery was elected vice chairman of the World Medical Association. In July 2017, he became chairman of the board of directors of Deutsche Apotheker- und Ärztebank which is a bank specialised on physicians and pharmacists in Germany as customers. The assembly of the World Medical Association on 25 April 2019 at Santiago de Chile elected him as chairman of the board for two years. He is also president of the Standing Committee of European Doctors since 2019.

== Career ==
Montgomery was born in Hamburg to a British father who came to Germany during World War II as a military officer, and a German mother who was a physician. He lives in Hamburg and is married to a physician with whom he has two children.

After studying medicine in Hamburg and Sydney, he became an approved medical doctor in Germany in 1979. He became a specialist for radiology in 1986.

He was chairman of the Hamburg chapter of Marburger Bund from 1983 to 2016. Moreover, he is member of the board of Deutsche Ärzteversicherung (German physicians' insurance) and was chairman of the German Medical Association from 1987 to 2002. From 1994 to 2002 and again from 2002 to 2018 he was president of the Hamburg Chamber of Physicians. As president of the German Medical Association, he held one of two co-chairs of the German Agency for Quality in Medicine.

Until the end of 2018, Montgomery worked as an attending physician at the University Medical Center Hamburg-Eppendorf. In 2012, the senate of the city of Hamburg awarded the honorary degree of 'Professor' to Montgomery. This was done in recognition of his engagement in social and health politics, science and medical ethics. In 2013, he was honored with the Dr.-Günther-Buch-Prize for medicine by the 'Johanna-und-Fritz-Buch-Gedächtnis-Stiftung'.

The Jewish Community of Düsseldorf awarded a medal to Montgomery in 2019 for his work on clarifying the role of the German Medical Association during the Nazi era, and for establishing ties to the Israel Medical Association.

== Ethical positions ==
In 2001, Montgomery backed the banning of preimplantation genetic diagnosis in Germany. One year later, he spoke out against the practice of forced application of emetics to secure criminal evidence, but recommended applying laxatives instead. He also advocates a mandatory vaccination against measles. In May 2020, he recommended a mandatory vaccination against the COVID-19 virus should there ever be a suitable vaccine.

== Criticism ==
When he was vice president of the German Medical Association, Montgomery was criticised over his statements in a bribery scandal. Some 3,000 physicians had received gifts or money for prescribing Ratiopharm medical products, and an investigation had been launched in the city of Ulm because of multiple suspicions of fraud and breach of trust. Montgomery called the business practices of physicians who had prescribed Ratiopharm products a "totally normal and natural behaviour", which could not be considered punishable. While the Ulm prosecutor found that the first two physicians involved in the issue had been bribed by Ratiopharm with a total amount of EUR 19,180, the investigation was closed in 2013 due to a lack of criminally relevant cases.

In 2012, the Federal Court of Justice of Germany ruled that physicians with a licence to bill the public health insurances in Germany cannot be prosecuted for bribery. Montgomery commented that the court had chosen the right path, but then also stated that no physician in Germany was allowed to accept gifts from pharmaceutical companies. According to article 34 of the professional responsibility code of German physicians, it is prohibited to ask for or accept compensations for prescribing medicine. In January 2013, he rejected political demands of turning the bribing of physicians into a criminal offence. "We reject a legal solution when it is a lex specialis made against physicians. We would, however, not oppose a law that is valid for all freelancers, i.e. also for architects, lawyers and journalists." Instead he demanded more investigative competencies be given to the medical associations and an "improvement in the framework for penalties" regarding matters of professional responsibility.

During the COVID-19 pandemic in April 2020, Montgomery was accused of unsettling the public and not living up to his responsibilities. He had called the wearing of scarves or cloths to cover mouth and nose "ridiculous". Virologist Alexander Kekulé described Montgomery's theses on facial covers as incomprehensible and "blatant nonsense". Montgomery was blamed for acting dangerously by creating doubts about the mandatory wearing of facial covers in Germany during the pandemic. His criticism of the government's failure to acquire stocks of high-quality facial masks in time was appreciated though. In August 2020, he reversed his earlier statements on mouth and nose coverings, saying that it was now known that any form of covering was giving considerable protection to the wearer. Asked about whether the public would question the crisis management as a result of such turnabouts, he said that it was completely normal that scientists argued about issues.
