= Haagsche Zwaan =

Building in The Hague

Coordinates: 52.0778°N 4.3344°E

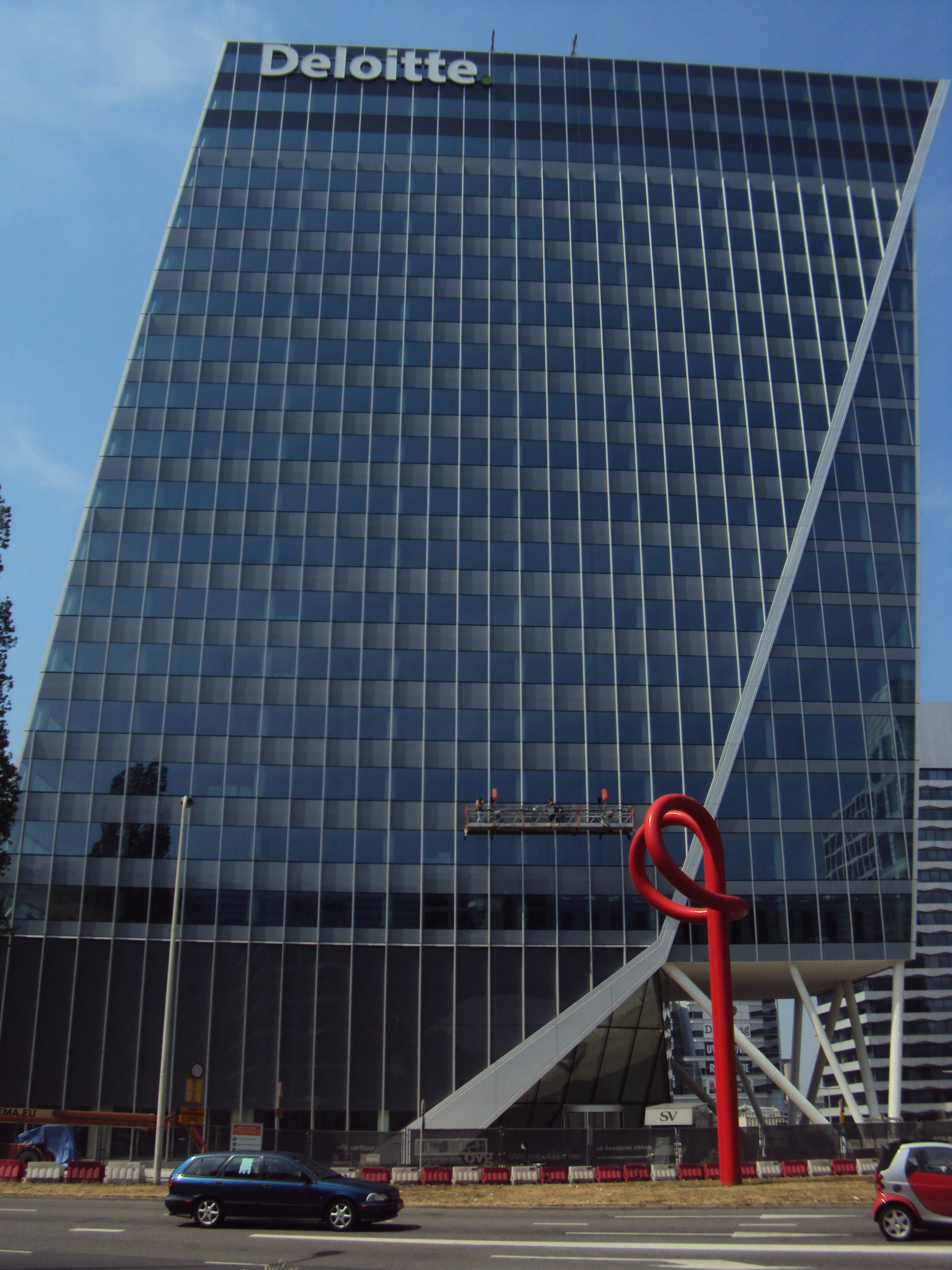
Haagsche Zwaan

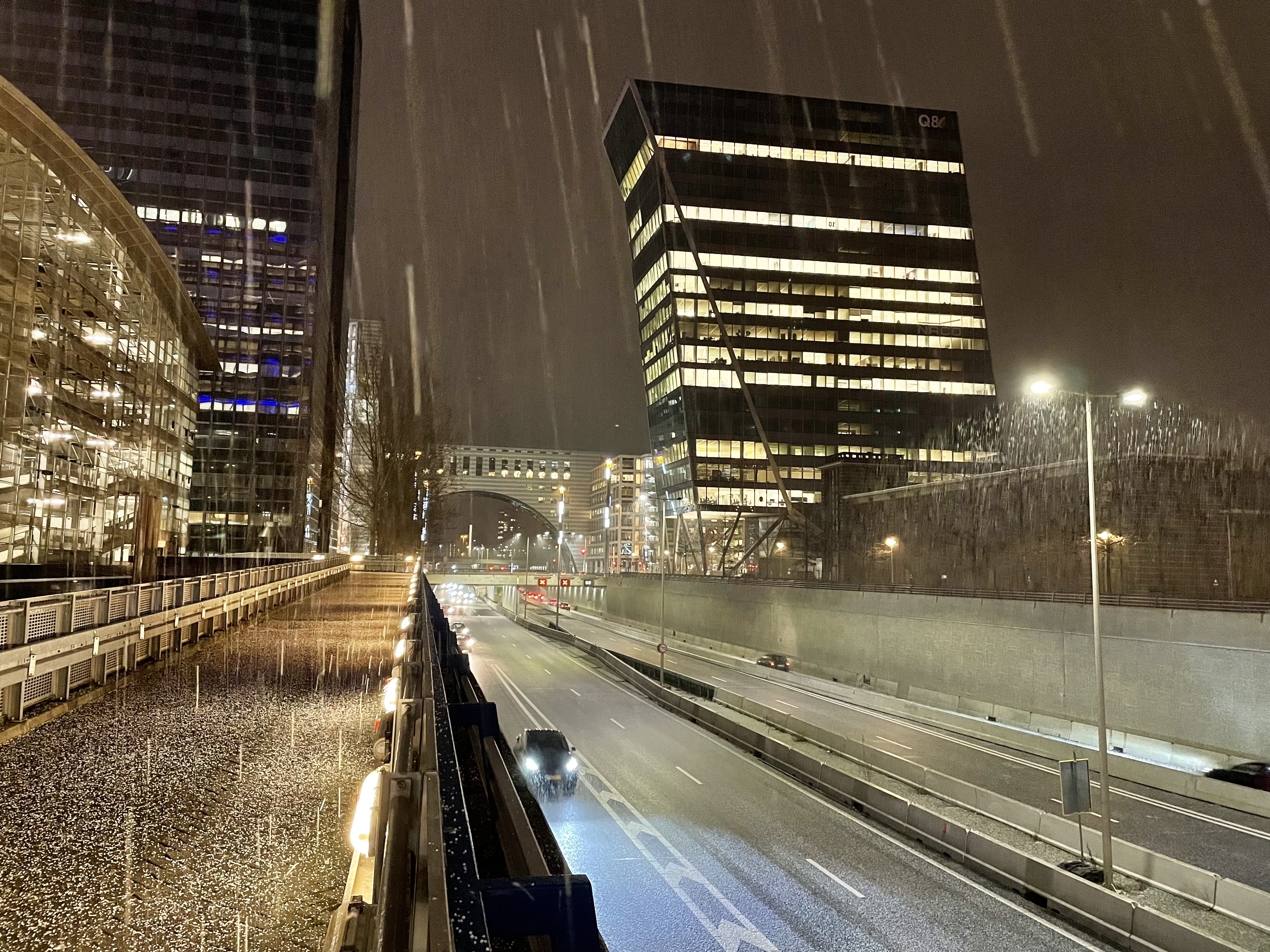
De Haagsche Zwaan cantilevered over the Utrechtsebaan motorway, at night, during a hailstorm

Haagsche Zwaan is an office building on Schenkkade 50 in The Hague. The building is 73.5 meters high and was designed at Studio VollaersZwart by architects ZZDP developed by OVG. The design looks like a swan, that is where the name Haagsche Zwaan comes from. The building is cantilevered 12 meters over the Utrechtsebaan, the gateway to The Hague.

Haagsche Zwaan has 20 floors and it is used for office space. Deloitte and Q8 are headquartered in Haagsche Zwaan. The building has an area of 18.000 m². The owner of the Haagsche Zwaan is Union Investment Real Estate GmbH and the administrator is Savills.

== History ==
The design for the building was created by ZZDP Architechen of Amsterdam. The company OVG began work on its construction in 2007. Buildings previously on the site were demolished. Because of its location near a busy highway, extra-thick glass was used.

The building was completed in August, 2010, ready for its main tenant Deloitte.

In 2011 Kuwait Petroleum established an office in the building.

In 2014 an art installation "Prima Ballerina" was installed on the facade of the building.

In 2015 the ICT company Cerner Benelux has offices in the building.
