= Christian finance =

Type of ethical finance following Christian ethic

Christian finance is a kind of ethical finance following Christian ethics. The notion of "Christian finance" or "Catholic finance" refers to banking and financial activities that are not widely used. Whether the activities of the Knights Templar (12th century), Mounts of Piety (appeared in 1462) or the Apostolic Chamber attached directly to the Vatican, a number of operations of a banking nature (money loan, guarantee) or a financial nature (issuance of securities, investments) were practiced, despite the prohibition of usury and the Catholic Church's distrust against exchange activities (opposed to production activities). Christian finance is characterized by the existence of three dimensions: personal (actors), operational (operations), and dogmatic (principles).

== General description ==
=== Actors ===
In the modern era, Catholic clerical finance continues to be conducted through the Vatican Bank (IOR), and many Catholic lay financial players also exist, both in Germany (e.g. Pax-Bank, Liga Bank, Darlehenskasse DKM) or the United States of America (e.g. Catholic Family Federal Credit Union, Holy Rosary Credit Union, Emerging Capital Funding). Other Christian community actors exist (e.g. Christian Community Credit Union, Kingdom Bank).

In France, if the General Union presented ostensibly as a Catholic credit institution, today, social finance (non-religious ethical finance) seems to have completely replaced Christian finance (e.g. Credit coopératif, Caisses de crédit municipal). However, with regard to ethical principles implemented and their historically Catholic origin, many actors of the solidarity finance can be attached to the category of Christian finance ("Catho-compatible players").

=== Financial products ===
If certain financial transactions were explicitly condemned because they circumvented the prohibition of usury (e.g. Mohatra contract), the operations of contemporary Catholic bank is characterized by their search for solidarity and the distribution of benefits in favor of the poor. For example, Liga Bank offers credit cards whose commissions are donated to charities supporting children.

=== Principles ===
As with Islamic finance, Catholic finance aims to supervise banking operations and financial activities with moral principles directly from the interpretation of Christian religious texts (Bible) and from the doctrine of the Roman Catholic Church (Treaty of virtues and vices, Catholic social teaching). Also, since the subprime financial crisis, it was found that the Pontifical Council for Justice and Peace took more often positions on financial matters.

In his book "Catholic Finance" (in French: “Finance catholique”), Dr. Antoine Cuny de la Verryère presents seven principles for a Catholic finance (named "princificats"). Some of them are inspired from the principles of Islamic finance: prohibition of short-termism, prohibition of non-virtuous investment, obligation to give priority to virtuous savings, prohibition of unjust profits, obligation to share profits, obligation of transparency, and obligation of financial exemplary.

== Worldwide development ==
=== Europe ===
The Christian Finance Observatory ("OFCCFO"), a non-profit international organization, gathering professionals of Christian ethical finance, announced in 2015 the publication of a "Fundamental Charter of Christian Ethical Finance". The Charter considers the various schools of Christian thoughts (Protestant, Catholic and Orthodox) on financial matters and is available in many languages. Beyond general principles, the Charter set out a practical codification of financial practices, and makes sorting between practices considered as virtuous and those considered as non-virtuous. The drafting committee brought together participants from several countries (Belgium, Luxembourg, Switzerland, Germany and France).

=== United States ===
S&P Dow Jones Indices created in August 2015 a new index that excludes companies apparently involved in activities that are deemed inconsistent with Catholic values. The OFCCFO's EXCELSIS Rating Committee considered that the product "S&P 500 Catholic Values Index" is eligible to the Quality Label EXCELSIS, rating should be "B−" (best is A+, worst is C−).

=== Eastern Orthodox finance ===
According to Russian press, a group of businessmen have started working December 2014 to the creation of an Orthodox bank and investment fund. Archpriest Vsevolod Chaplin has welcomed the project because it would rectify usurious mechanisms.
