= Münchener Hypothekenbank =

Bank in Germany

- Trade name: MHB
- Company type: Cooperative
- Industry: Financial services
- Founded: December 2, 1896; 129 years ago
- Founder: Bavarian State Government
- Headquarters: Munich, Germany
- Area served: Bavaria
- Products: Mortgages
- Owner: Its members
- Website: mhb.de

Münchener Hypothekenbank eG (lit. 'Munich Mortgage Bank', shortened as MünchenerHyp or MHB) is a mortgage bank under the legal form of a registered cooperative (German: eingetragenen Genossenschaft). The shareholders of MünchenerHyp are other cooperative banks and approximately 60,000 cooperative customers. MünchenerHyp is a member of the Verband deutscher Pfandbriefbanken, of the Bundesverband der Deutschen Volksbanken und Raiffeisenbanken (BVR) and of the Bavarian Cooperative Association. It has been designated as a Significant Institution since the entry into force of European Banking Supervision in late 2014, and as a consequence is directly supervised by the European Central Bank.

It is one of the largest cooperative banks by number of members, and one of the few independent "Pfandbrief banks" in Germany.

== History ==
The company was founded on December 2, 1896, as the Bavarian Agricultural Bank (German: Bayerische Landwirthschaftsbank) and was supported by the cooperative sector and the then Royal Bavarian state government under Prince Regent Luitpold. The Bavarian state granted non-interest-bearing capital of one million gold marks and an interest-bearing operating advance of one million gold marks as start-up capital. The Bayerische Landwirthschaftsbank was originally involved in the agricultural sector, but after the end of World War I it gradually expanded its business areas to become a generalist mortgage bank. In 1971 the company was therefore renamed and took its current name.

The Münchener Hypothekenbank has a link to the House of Wittelsbach. In 1897, Prince Regent Luitpold allowed the bank to use the Bavarian royal crown in its seal. Until 2011, Max Emanuel, a member of the house, was deputy chairman of the bank's supervisory board.

== See also ==
- German Cooperative Financial Group
- List of banks in the euro area
- List of banks in Germany
