= DZ Bank =

Second largest bank in Germany by asset size

DZ Bank AG

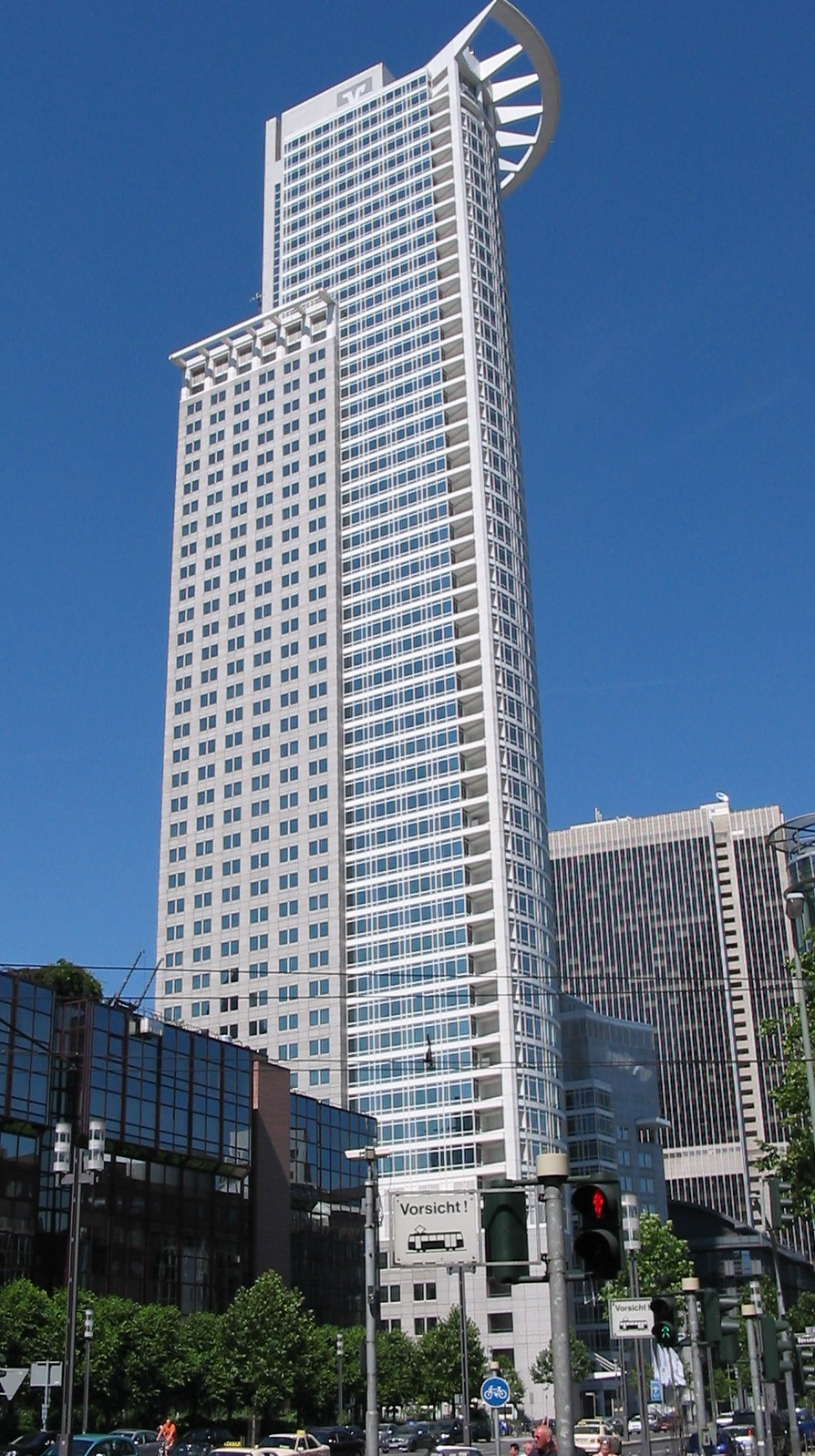
- Westend Tower in Frankfurt, Germany
- Type: Private company. Aktiengesellschaft
- Industry: Banking
- Predecessor: DG Bank; GZ-Bank
- Founded: 2001
- Headquarters: Frankfurt, Germany
- Area served: Germany
- Key people: Cornelius Riese (CEO); Henning Deneke-Jöhrens (Chairman Supervisory Board)
- Products: Banking services
- Revenue: ▲€26.09 billion (2024)
- Operating income: ▲€8.700 billion (2024)
- Net income: ▲€2.39 billion (2024)
- Total assets: ▲€675.686 billion (Q2 2026)
- Total equity: ▲€32.58 billion (2024)
- Number of employees: ▲33,837 (2024)
- Website: dzbank.com

DZ Bank AG (German pronunciation: [deː ˈt͡sɛt baŋk aːɡeː]) is the second largest bank in Germany by asset size and the central institution for around 700 cooperative banks and their around 7,200 branch offices. Within that Bundesverband der Deutschen Volksbanken und Raiffeisenbanken, which is one of Germany's largest private sector financial service organizations and manages assets of around 1.175 trillion euros, DZ Bank functions both as a central institution and as a corporate and investment bank.

DZ Bank is an acronym for Deutsche Zentral-Genossenschaftsbank (literally "German Central Cooperative Bank").

As a holding, the DZ Bank Group defines itself primarily as a service provider for local cooperative banks and their 30 million or so clients. The DZ Bank Group includes: Bausparkasse Schwäbisch Hall, a building society; DZ HYP (German pronunciation: [deː t͡sɛt ˈhyp aːˌɡeː]), a provider of commercial real estate finance; DZ Privatbank Gruppe; R+V Versicherung, an insurance company; TeamBank, a provider of consumer finance; Union Investment Group, an asset management company; VR Smart Finanz; and various other specialized institutions.

DZ Bank, headquartered in Frankfurt, Germany, is a member of CIBP, EACB, the Euro Banking Association, and Unico. It maintains branches, subsidiaries and representative offices in key financial centers and economic regions worldwide. The DZ Bank building in Berlin, located at Pariser Platz 3, was designed by architect Frank Gehry.

DZ Bank also has one of the most significant collections of contemporary artistic photography which today comprises over 8,000 works by more than 550 artists.

In 2016 DZ Bank was merged with WGZ Bank, the central institute of the cooperative banks of both the Rheinland (Rhineland) and Westfalen (Westphalia).

DZ Bank has been designated as a Significant Institution since the entry into force of European Banking Supervision in late 2014, and as a consequence is directly supervised by the European Central Bank.

== Investments ==
DZ Bank is a shareholder of Canadian oil and gas company TC Energy, which is behind the controversial Coastal GasLink Pipeline slated to be built on unceded Wet'suwet'en Nation territory in Northern British Columbia. DZ Bank increased their stake on 31 March 2020 from 1.22 million to 4.27M shares, an increase of ~250%.

== See also ==
- DVB Bank
- Reisebank
- German Cooperative Financial Group
- Bundesverband der Deutschen Volksbanken und Raiffeisenbanken
- List of banks in the euro area
- List of banks in Germany
