= Mohatra contract =

European usury law workaround

A mohatra contract is way of loaning money with interest without breaking the letter of the usury laws. The lender sells the borrower a trivial object to be paid for on the loan due date. The borrower then sells the same object back immediately for cash at the price minus the interest. An example would be a lender selling a pencil for $120 to be paid in a year's time and immediately repurchasing it for $100 in cash. The borrower has effectively borrowed $100 at a 20% interest rate.

== Etymology ==
The term was shared among Latin and Western European languages, from Arabic mokhatara (مخاطرة).

== History ==
Mohatra contract was so common that it became a standard commercial term used for centuries. Issuing a decree in 1679, the Holy Office of the Vatican condemned the idea that 'contractus "mohatra" licitus est', stating that such contracts violated the biblical prohibitions on usury. Pope Innocent XI condemns mohatra with the language, "The contract of Mohatra is lawful, though made with the same person, and with a reselling of the same thing, before agreed on, with a design of gain."

== See also ==
- Islamic banking and finance
- Murabaha
- Profit and loss sharing
- Riba
