= Bausparkasse Schwäbisch Hall =

Coordinates: 49.11326°N 9.74719°E

Bausparkasse Schwäbisch Hall AG
- Company type: Corporation
- Industry: Building society
- Founded: 16 May 1931
- Headquarters: Schwäbisch Hall, Germany
- Total assets: €68.3 billion (2017)
- Number of employees: 13,625 (2017)
- Website: www.schwaebisch-hall.de

Bausparkasse Schwäbisch Hall AG (German pronunciation: [ˈbaʊ̯ʃpaːɐ̯ˌkasə ˌʃvɛːbɪʃ ˈhal aːˌɡeː]) is a building society in Germany, active abroad with subsidiaries in Eastern Europe and China. It has more than 10 million customers. Shareholders are the cooperative central bank DZ Bank (96.8 percent) in Frankfurt am Main and around 600 cooperative banks. The building society has its headquarters in the city of Schwäbisch Hall in Baden-Württemberg.

It is part of the German Cooperative Financial Group which has around 11,000 branches and approximately 3,400 employees.

== History ==
Today's Bausparkasse Schwäbisch Hall AG was founded in 1931 in Cologne as a German building society AG, construction savings and debt relief fund by members of the local Chamber of Crafts. After the transfer of the business office to Berlin in 1936, the German Central Cooperative Fund and most of the Central Commercial Funds participated in the company, which was meanwhile called Gesellschaft für zweitstelligen Grundkredit, Deutscher Bausparer Aktiengesellschaft. In 1941 the Volksbanks followed, since then it was called Bausparkasse der deutschen Volksbanken.

The company headquarter was bombed out in 1943, 1944 the operation together with the rescued business documents was moved to Schwäbisch Hall. The decision to retain this city as a corporate seat was made in 1947. At that time the creation of new housing was important, which was promoted from 1952 with the housing subsidy by the state. Since the conversion into the common mortgage lending institute of the Volksbanks and the Raiffeisenverband in 1956, the enterprise bears the name Bausparkasse Schwäbisch Hall AG. 1970 the last name changes to Bausparkasse Schwäbisch Hall AG, Bausparkasse der Volksbanken und Raiffeisebanken took place.

As a result of the fall of the Berlin Wall, the company was able to extended its business to the new federal states in 1990. The legal change in the year 1991 caused that for the first-time own holding companies could be established abroad. Branches in Luxembourg and France and subsidiaries in Slovakia, the Czech Republic, Romania, Hungary and the China were founded.

Bausparkasse Schwäbisch Hall has been designated as a Significant Institution since the entry into force of European Banking Supervision in late 2014, and as a consequence is directly supervised by the European Central Bank.

== Core business areas of the building society Schwäbisch Hall ==
- Mortgage lending
- Construction Financing
- Cross selling
- Foreign countries

== Subsidiary companies ==
- Schwäbisch Hall Kreditservice GmbH
- Schwäbisch Hall Facility Management GmbH
- Schwäbisch Hall Training GmbH

== Key figures ==
| Jahr | 2018 | 2017 | 2016 | 2015 | 2014 | 2013 |
|---|---|---|---|---|---|---|
| Customers (millions) | 7,3 | 7,4 | 7,5 | 7,4 | 7,3 | 7,0 |
| New mortgage loan business (€ bn) | 28 | 29,2 | 35,0 | 31,1 | 36 | 32,8 |
