= Union Investment =

German asset management firm

Union Asset Management Holding AG
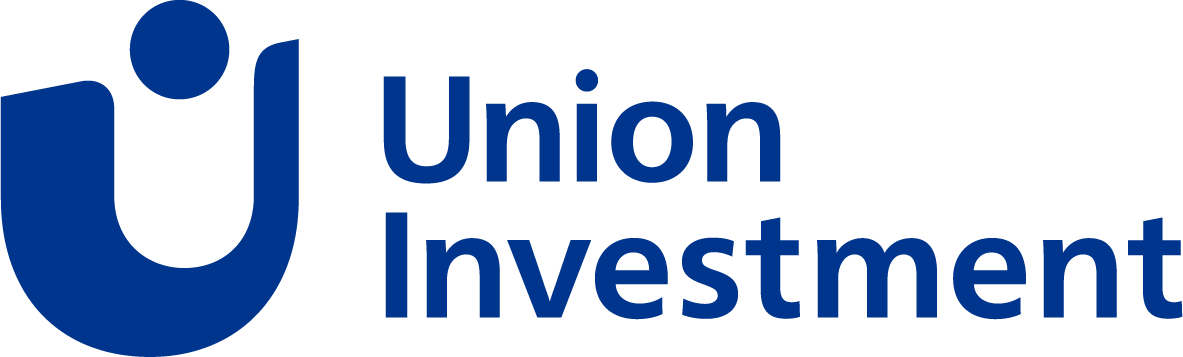

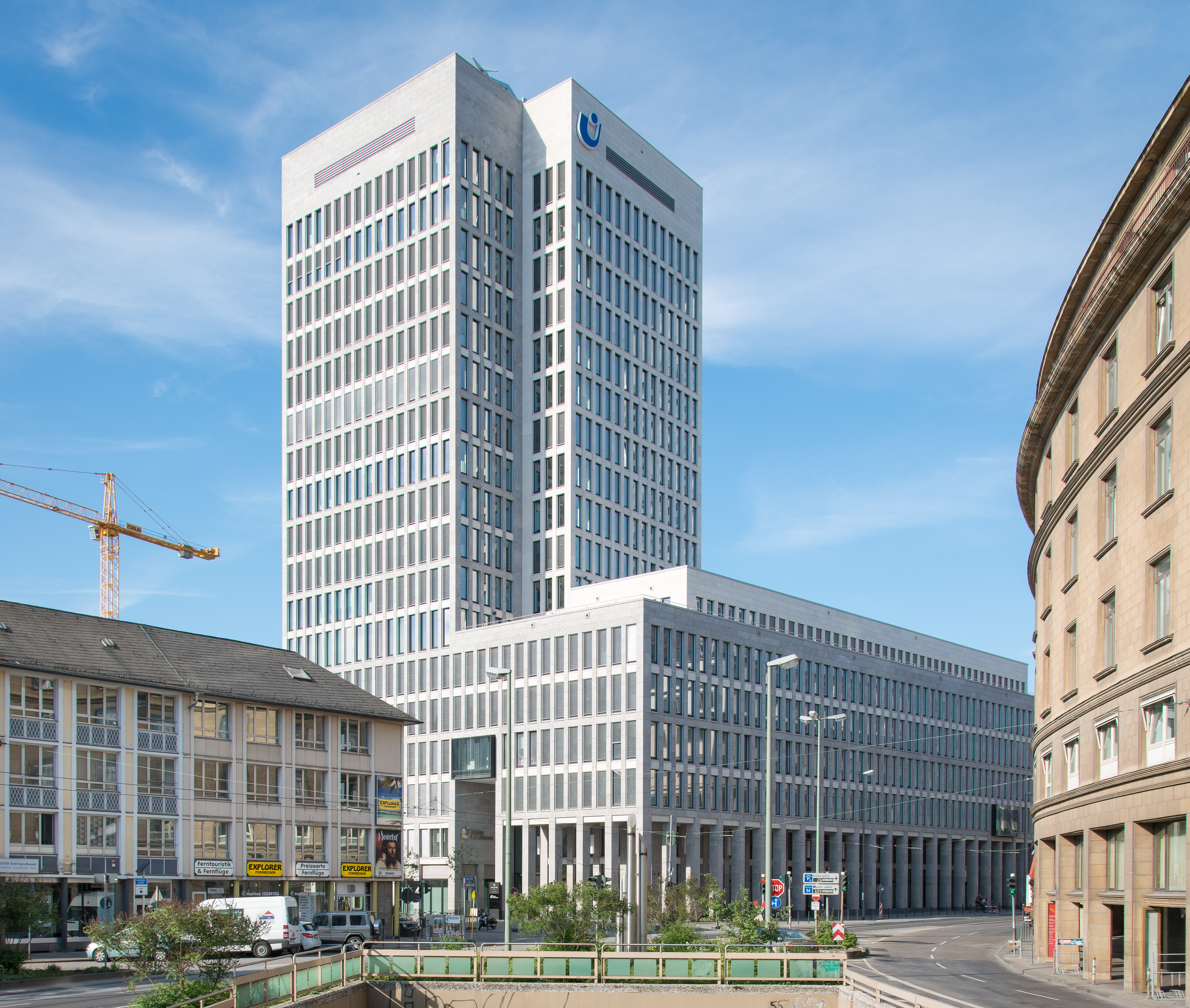
- Union Investment headquarters in Frankfurt am Main
- Trade name: Union Investment
- Type: Subsidiary
- Industry: Investment management
- Founded: 26 January 1956; 70 years ago
- Headquarters: Frankfurt, Germany
- Key people: André Haagmann (CEO) Sonja Albers, Frank Engels, Giovanni Gay Cornelius Riese (chairman of the supervisory board)
- Number of employees: 4.394
- Parent: DZ Bank
- Website: www.union-investment.de

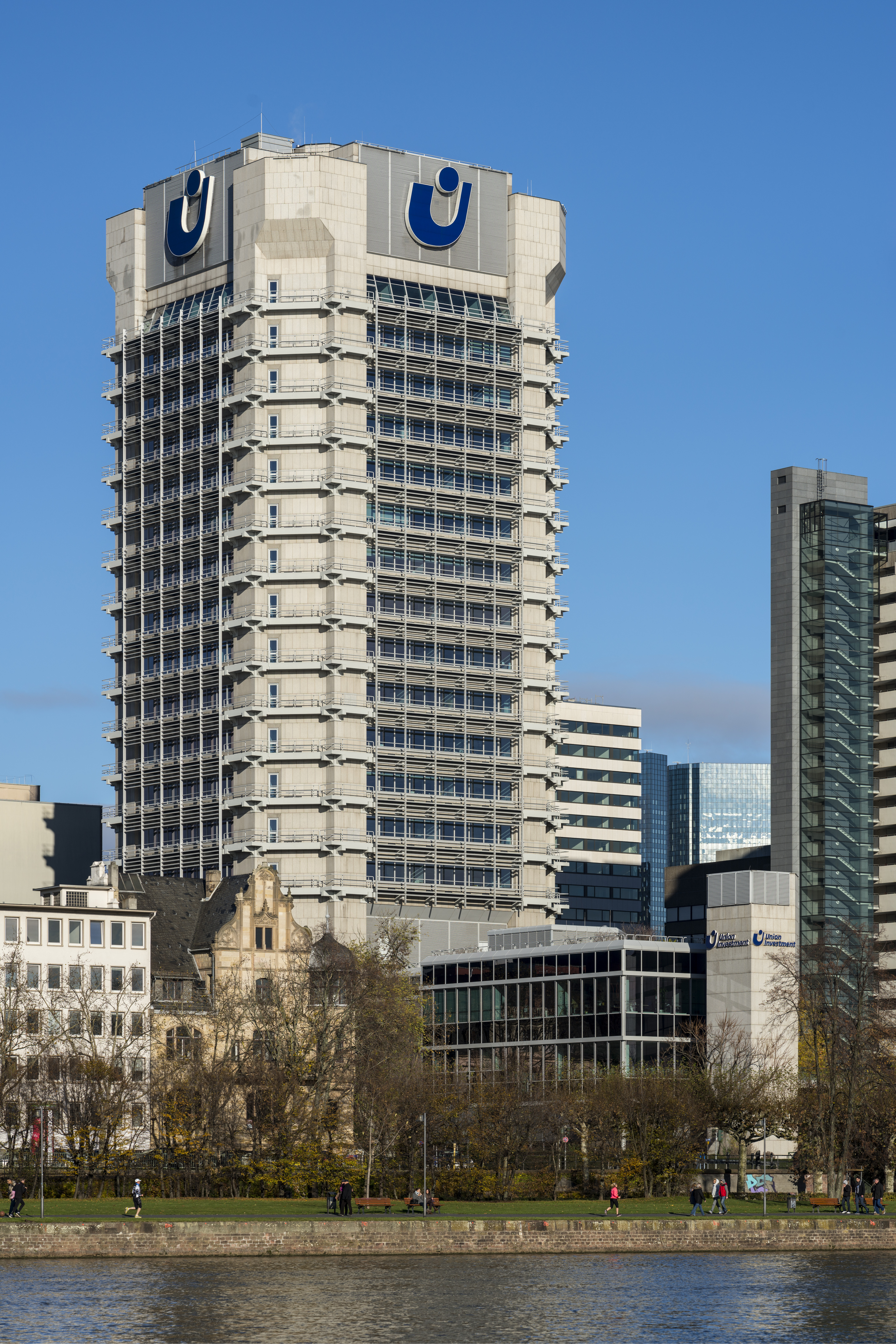
Union Investment former headquarters

Union Asset Management Holding AG (German pronunciation: [uˌni̯oːn ɪnˈvɛstmɛnt]) is the investment arm of the DZ Bank Group and part of the cooperative financial services network. It was founded in 1956 and is headquartered in Frankfurt.

The mutual open-end funds are distributed both through the over 640 Volks- und Raiffeisenbanken and via the sales force of Bausparkasse Schwäbisch Hall AG, and in part through the external services of Bausparkasse Schwäbisch Hall AG, DZ Bank Group's building society.

The primary shareholders in Union Investment are DZ Bank with 72.37%, BBBank, and the credit unions through their membership associations.

As of 31 December 2025, Union Investment has self-declared assets under management of approximately 534.6 billion euro.

== Subsidiaries ==
Subsidiaries under the umbrella of Union Asset Management Holding AG include:

- Attrax S.A. in Luxembourg for funds brokerage, distribution, share administration and custody services
- Union Investment Institutional Property for institutional property investments
- Union Investment Management GmbH, Frankfurt am Main
- Union Investment Luxembourg S.A. in Luxembourg
- Union Investment Real Estate GmbH (formerly DIFA Deutsche Immobilien Fonds AG) is the second largest German property investment association in Hamburg.
- Quoniam Asset Management GmbH follows a quantitative approach to investment and manages funds for institutional clients.
- ZBI Fondsmanagement AG, Erlangen
- Union Investment Services & IT GmbH, Frankfurt am Main
- ZBI Immobilienmanagement GmbH, Erlangen
- ZBVV – Zentral Boden Vermietung und Verwaltung GmbH, Erlangen
- ZBI GmbH, Erlangen
- Union Investment Service Bank AG, Frankfurt am Main

== History ==
The Union-Investment-Gesellschaft mbH was the third German investment association to be founded, on 26 January 1956, by 14 credit unions. The UniFonds stock fund was created the same year as its first open-end fund. The first offering of investment vehicles outside Germany was in 1961, in Belgium.

Co op Immobilienfonds Verwaltung AG was founded in Hamburg in 1965 and in 1980 renamed Deutsche Immobilien Fonds AG or DIFA. The initial stockholders were the Central Institute of Consumer Cooperatives and the Bank für Gemeinwirtschaft. In 1966 DIFA launched an open-end property fund, Co op Immobilienfonds, later renamed DIFA-Fonds Nr. 1 (DIFA Fund No. 1). Starting on 15 January 2007, DIFA did business under the name Union Investment Real Estate AG; in 2009 it was converted to a GmbH.

Since 1967, Union Investment has offered management of investment accounts. In 1968, it offered its first retirement fund, UniRenta. In 1969, it reached a fund capitalization of 1 billion DM.

Union Investment Luxembourg S.A. was founded in 1988. The total capitalization of the group was now 10 billion DM.

In April 1994, Union Investment began offering stock-based wealth management with three strategic variants: chance, growth and security. In 1996 it introduced stock-based life insurance under the name Opti Plan.

The holding company Union-Fonds-Holding AG was founded in 1999 and changed its name in July 2002 to Union Asset Management Holding AG.
