= Pax-Bank =

Pax-Bank eG
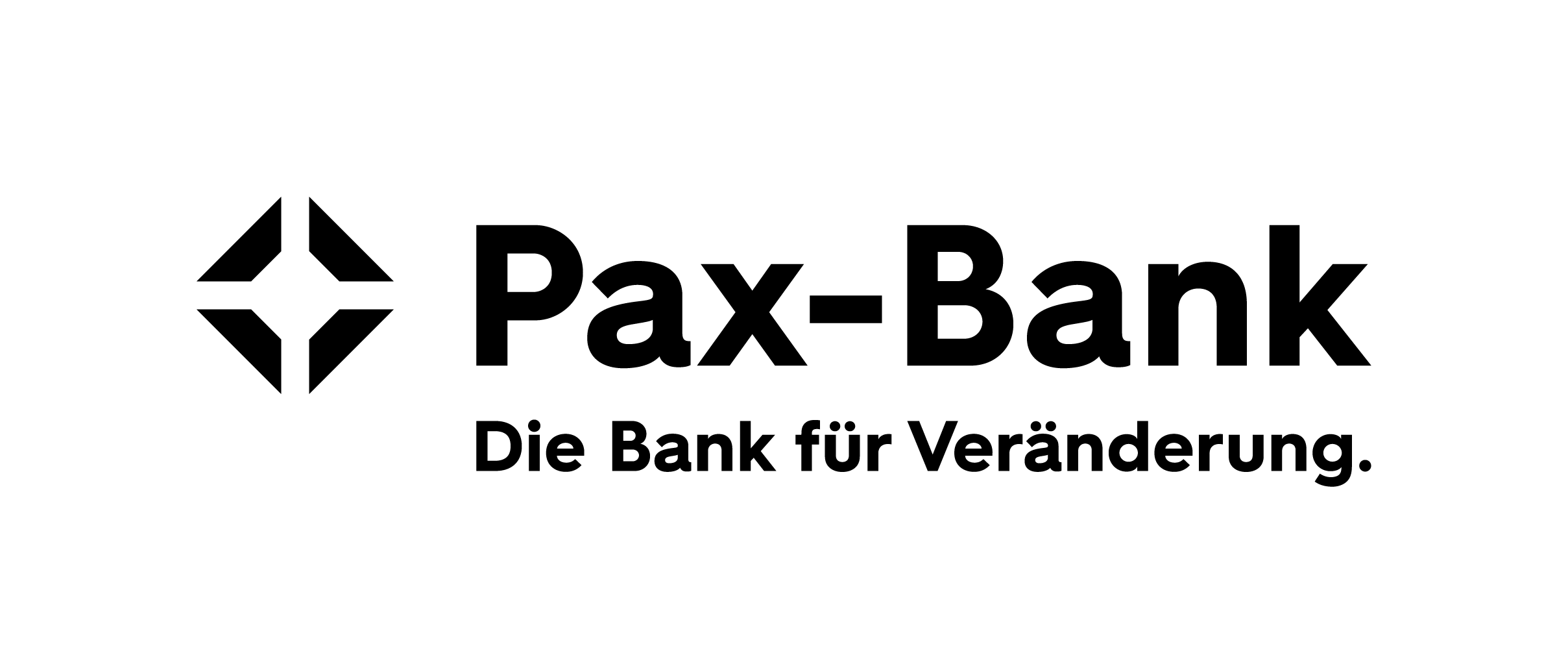

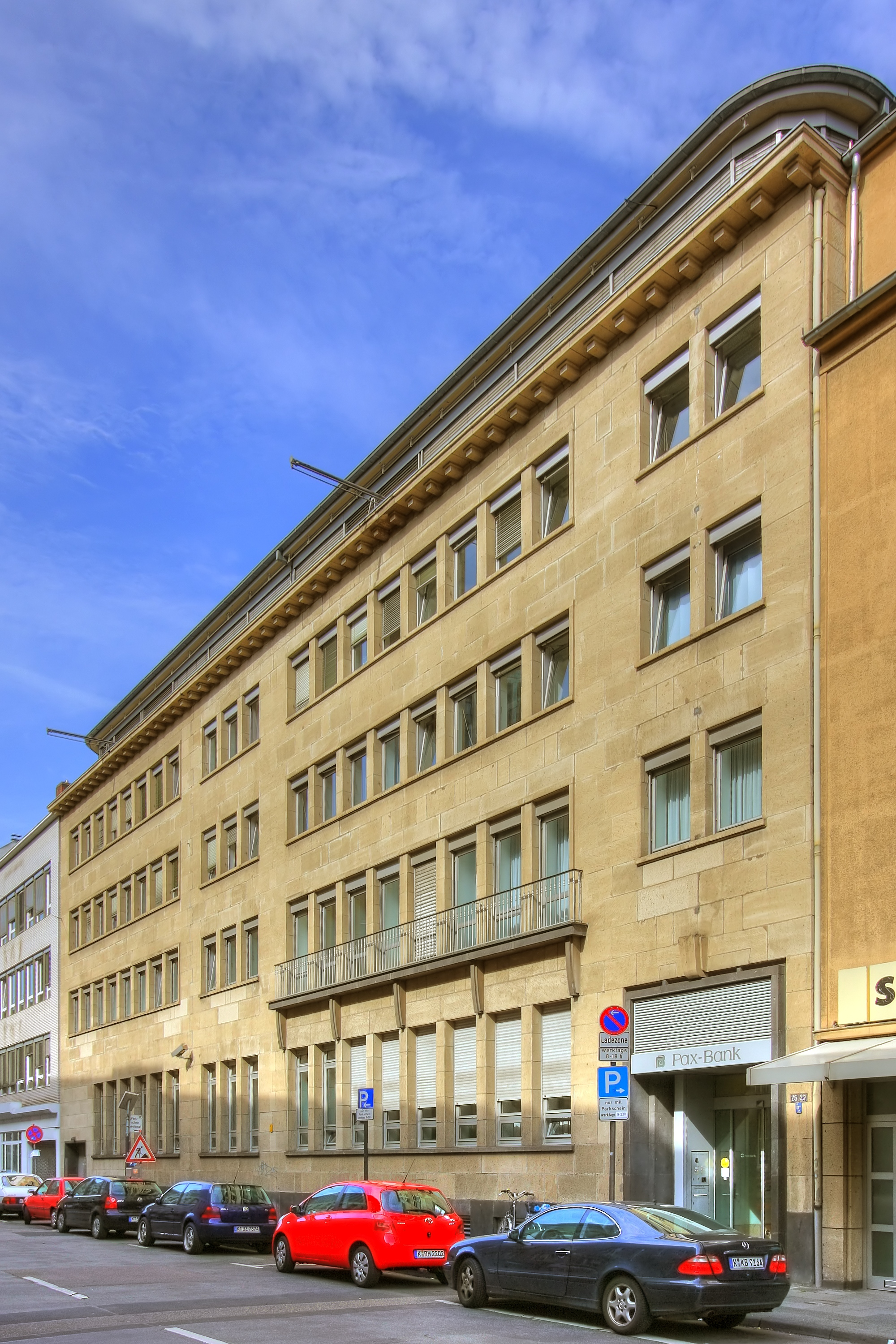
- Pax-Bank headquarters in Cologne, Von-Werth-Strasse 25-27.
- Type: Cooperative
- Industry: Banking
- Founded: 1917
- Headquarters: Cologne
- Products: Universal bank
- Number of employees: 190+ (2018)
- Website: www.pax-bank.de

Pax-Bank eG is a German bank that focuses on Christian finance headquartered in Cologne. The bank states that it is a German: Bank für Kirche und Caritas (Bank for the Church and Charities), a cooperative Catholic universal bank. Its members consist of institutions of the Catholic Church and private individuals from the clerical field. The bank was founded as a self-help organization by and for priests in 1917 in Cologne.

The bank was founded as a Pax Spar- und Darlehnskasse eGmbH as a self-help organization of priests for priests on October 18, 1917 in Cologne. Its forerunner organization was the 1905 founded Pax Vereinigung katholischer Kleriker from Cologne, in which priests supported each other.

Together with the Bank für Kirche und Caritas eG Paderborn, the DKM Darlehenskasse Münster and the Bank im Bistum Essen it is one of the four catholic banks in North Rhine-Westphalia. The banks' clients mainly consist of Dioceses, religious orders, church congregations and their social services, but does accept private customers. Unlike in the past, non-Christians can become customers today.

As of 2018, the bank has 190 members of staff at the Cologne headquarter and six branches in German and representative office in Rome in close proximity to the Vatican. It has approximately 30,000 customers (private/institutions).

The bank focuses on socially responsible investing (e.g. microfinance investments) and investment management. It also provides LIGA Pay Union Funds, real estate consultation, EU-development funds, fundraising and foundation consultation services. The bank itself says that ethics and sustainability are important to its business and determines the economic actions it takes in the pursuit of profit.

== History ==
The bank was founded as a self-help organization by and for priests in 1917 in Cologne. The bank opened branches in Aachen in 1958, Berlin in 1992, Erfurt in 1992, Essen in 1958, Mainz in 1985 and Trier in 1980. In 2001 the bank opened a representative office in Rome in close proximity to the Vatican.

Since 2005 the bank annually awards the "Pax-Bank-Preis" (Pax-Bank-Award) for Interfaith dialogue and receives consulting for it by the "Georges-Anawati-Stiftung" (Georges-Anawati-Foundation). The €5,000 price is presented by the chief executive.

In 2017 the former German Federal President Christian Wulff was honored for his dedication and contribution to the intercultural-religious dialog.

In August 2009 it was made public that one of the bank's non-ethical investment funds held shares of a defense contractor, a tobacco company and of a pharmaceutics manufacturer, which also produces contraceptives. Immediately after this became public knowledge, the corporate management divested the affected papers. In addition, the control mechanisms were refined and the ethical alignment of all funds were checked. As the subsidiary "PBA Uerlichs + Finger Versicherungsvermittlungs-GmbH" offers Pax-Bank customers individual insurance products.

In 2018, Pax-Bank was the first church bank in Germany to offer a crowdfunding platform. Charitable and public Institutions and providers can present and circulate their project ideas on the platform and thereby generate the needed funds.

== See also ==
- List of banks in Germany
