= Bank im Bistum Essen =

Coordinates: 51.45427°N 7.01546°E

Bank im Bistum Essen eG
- Company type: Cooperative banking
- Industry: Banking
- Founded: 1966; 60 years ago
- Headquarters: Essen, Germany
- Total assets: €5.137 billion (2018)
- Members: 4,419 (2018)
- Website: www.bibessen.de

The Bank im Bistum Essen eG (BIB) is a German cooperative bank located in Essen and has clients that are not-for-profit, ethical and sustainable organisations and their employees. These include the Catholic Church and its institutions.

Its members are organisations such as hospitals, foundations, church-related housing construction, homes for disabled people, retirement homes and other institutions of provision – as well as a number of private customers: staff members of the institutions mentioned above. The bank offers a range of banking services for defined organisations and individuals.

The BIB is one of four Catholic church banks in North Rhine-Westphalia. The others are the Bank für Kirche und Caritas eG in Paderborn, the DKM Darlehnskasse Münster and the Pax-Bank in Cologne.

As of 2016, BIB was 21st on the list of the largest cooperative banks in Germany by assets.

The Bank im Bistum Essen eG (BIB) has capital of around 6.5 billion euros and employs almost 180 associates. The President of the Management Board, Peter Güllmann, stated that Bank im Bistum Essen is a church bank that, with 4.5 billion euros, has one of the largest loan portfolios. He stated that the bank with the microcredit fund finances a total of more than 750,000 people worldwide. Last year, the bank received 1,500 new private clients, and this tendency is increasing. Private clients account for almost 15 percent of the bank's business volume.

After deducting all taxes, Bank im Bistum Essen had a net profit of more than 30 million euros in 2023. The dividend for members of the church cooperative bank was increased to 3.5 percent. Güllmann believes that "ethics and profitability go together, they fit together and belong together in the bank".

== History ==
The bank was founded in 1966.

Since 2012 people who do not work for the church such as atheists or people of other religions can also become customers. Due to the bank's ethic sustainability orientation, numerous customers from the charitable-foundations-field have joined the bank since then. The cooperative does not provide services to companies that are solely profit oriented.

Since 2006, the bank offered loans worldwide to microfinance institutions. Apart from this the bank launched two microfinance funds for institutional investors in which the bank itself invested as well and which are managed by the bank itself. BIB was the first credit institution in Germany that offered private customers the ability to invest into the microfinance sector via a passbook.

== Clients ==
The actions of the BIB are focused on the idea of sustainable development. The bank describes its business orientation with the slogan FairBanking. The slogan means to describe the connection between economic, social and environmental responsibility. The Christian principle, to preserve creation, is routed in the bank's strategy.

== Services ==
The bank's services include:

- Financing of social properties like hospitals and care homes
- Financing of housing construction
- Deployment of electronic bank services
- Asset management from savings accounts through to investments in special funds in due consideration of ethic sustainability aspects
- Microfinance

== Sustainability and social responsibility ==
According to the bank sustainability is part of the business policy of the Bank im Bistum Essen Environmental impacts of the bank's business activities are being measured in an internal Life-cycle assessment. Goal of the life cycle assessment is to improve operating numbers for "electricity", "heating energy", "paper", "water" and "waste" permanently, to make an appropriate contribution toward environmental protection. In addition, all of the bank's own investments are to be invested according to ESG criteria. The bank's product range is constantly updated with sustainable products. This includes ethic-sustainable managed funds as well as the initiation and the management of microfinance funds.

The bank's foundation Kirche und Caritas supports regional, national and international projects.

== See also ==
- List of banks in Germany
