= Deutsche Apotheker- und Ärztebank =

Cooperative bank in Germany

Coordinates: 51.244552°N 6.73686°E

Deutsche Apotheker- und Ärztebank eG (Apobank)
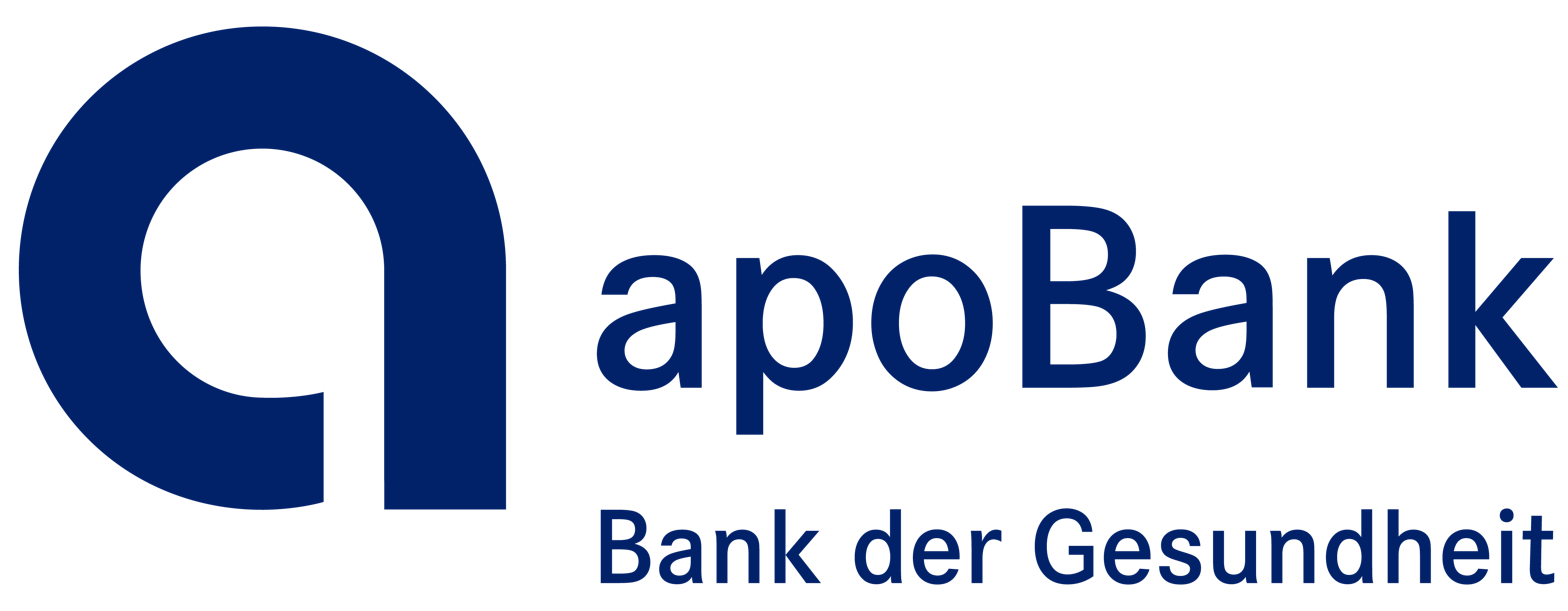
- Type: Cooperative
- Industry: Cooperative banking
- Founded: 1902
- Headquarters: Düsseldorf, Germany
- Net income: 61,923,766.25 euro (2017)
- Total assets: 45.3 Mio. Euro (2018)
- Members: 113.455 (2018)
- Number of employees: 2,523 (2018)
- Website: apobank.de

The Deutsche Apotheker- und Ärztebank eG (ApoBank, German bank for pharmacists and physicians) is a cooperative bank headquartered in Düsseldorf.

Apobank has been designated as a Significant Institution since the entry into force of European Banking Supervision in late 2014, and as a consequence is directly supervised by the European Central Bank.

== Structure ==
The Deutsche Apotheker- und Ärztebank is affiliated to the National Association of German Cooperative Banks (BVR). It offers its services primarily to members of medical professions like physicians, dentists, psychotherapists and pharmacists, their relatives, professional associations of medical professions as well as company clients from the health care industry.

== Organization ==
The Apobank has a five-person board of directors and a supervisory committee consisting of 23 members. The board of directors is supported by an advisory council. In 2016, the cooperative had 107,000 members, 406,000 customers and 2,563 staff members at 84 locations.

== History ==
In 1902 the Kredit-Verein Deutscher Apotheker (KREDA; credit union of German pharmacists) was founded in Danzig by 18 pharmacists. In 1938 it was renamed Deutsche Apothekerbank e.G.m.b.H. and in 1939 it merged with the Spar- und Kreditverein Deutscher Apotheker m.b.H. After the bank was closed in 1945, it was re-established in 1948 as Westdeutsche Apothekerbank e.G.m.b.H. in Düsseldorf. For years the bank has been the biggest German cooperative bank according to total assets.

== Annual financial statements ==
The 2008 financial crisis led to a massive slump of the net income. After no dividend was distributed for the fiscal year 2009 the Apobank paid a dividend of 4% for the fiscal years 2010 to 2016.

== Awards ==
The Deutsche Aptheker- und Ärztebank awards the Karl-Winter-Medal.

== See also ==
- List of banks in the euro area
- List of banks in Germany
