= Bankcard-Servicenetz =

German interbank network group

The Bankcard-Servicenetz (lit. 'bank card service network') is a German ATM card interbank network group provided by the Volksbanken und Raiffeisenbanken services group. Technically it is not an interbank network but uses the pre-existing girocard network. Member banks of this cash credit group charge ATM usage fees at a low level and most customers of the co-operative banks enjoy free withdrawal from their accounts. With 19,200 ATMs the Bankcard-Servicenetz group is the second largest ATM group in Germany (after the savings banks network).

In March 2012 more than 99% of the co-operative banks associated in the Federal Association of German 'Volksbanken und Raiffeisenbanken' Co-operative Banks participated in the Bankcard-Servicenetz network. The federal association publishes a list of banks that are not offering this service.

Unlike other ATM groups like the Cash Group and CashPool, the ATM service network of Bankcard-Servicenetz is not free of charge – the service fee is not waived but the compact restricts the service fee to a common low level (usually 1,02 Euro and in some locations 2,05 Euro). However, in most tariffs of checking accounts, the service fee is taken over by the bank making the usage of the Bankcard-Servicenetz to be effectively free of charge to the customers. Some banks will show this by presenting a line of "Übernahme Gebühr: 1,02 EUR" ("Takeover (of) Fees: 1,02 EUR") on the statement of account.

Some banks with a very scattered structure of customers choose to not join the ATM group as the share of paying other bank's service fees would be significantly larger than being able to charge service fees within the interbank network. This is often the case with some industry trades co-operatives and most of the ecclesiastical banks.

Banks that are not "Volksbanken und Raiffeisenbanken" but still members of the Bankcard-Servicenetz:

- Deutsche Apotheker- und Ärztebank
- BBBank
- PSD Bank
- GLS Gemeinschaftsbank
- Sparda-Bank
- Bank für Kirche und Diakonie eG - KD-Bank
- Bank für Sozialwirtschaft
- Bank im Bistum Essen
- Edekabank
- MKB Mittelstandskreditbank AG
- Pax-Bank
- DKM Darlehnskasse Münster
- LIGA Bank

Some CashPool member banks have chosen to join also the Bankcard-Servicenetz. However, they point their customers to use CashPool ATMs for free withdrawal while offering to use the Bankcard-Servicenetz ATMs as a fallback option that allows depositors to withdraw cash money at a low fee that is actually charged to customers. This is the case for BBBank (2 times per month the fee is taken over), Bank für Sozialwirtschaft, and Sparda-Bank.

== Opt-out list ==
The list of 'Volksbanken und Raiffeisenbanken' institutes that do not participate in the Bankcard-Servicenetz is listed on the homepage of the Bundesverband der Deutschen Volksbanken und Raiffeisenbanken (BVR). As of July 2015 the list did include only the

- Sylter Bank eG
