= European Association of Co-operative Banks =

- EACB
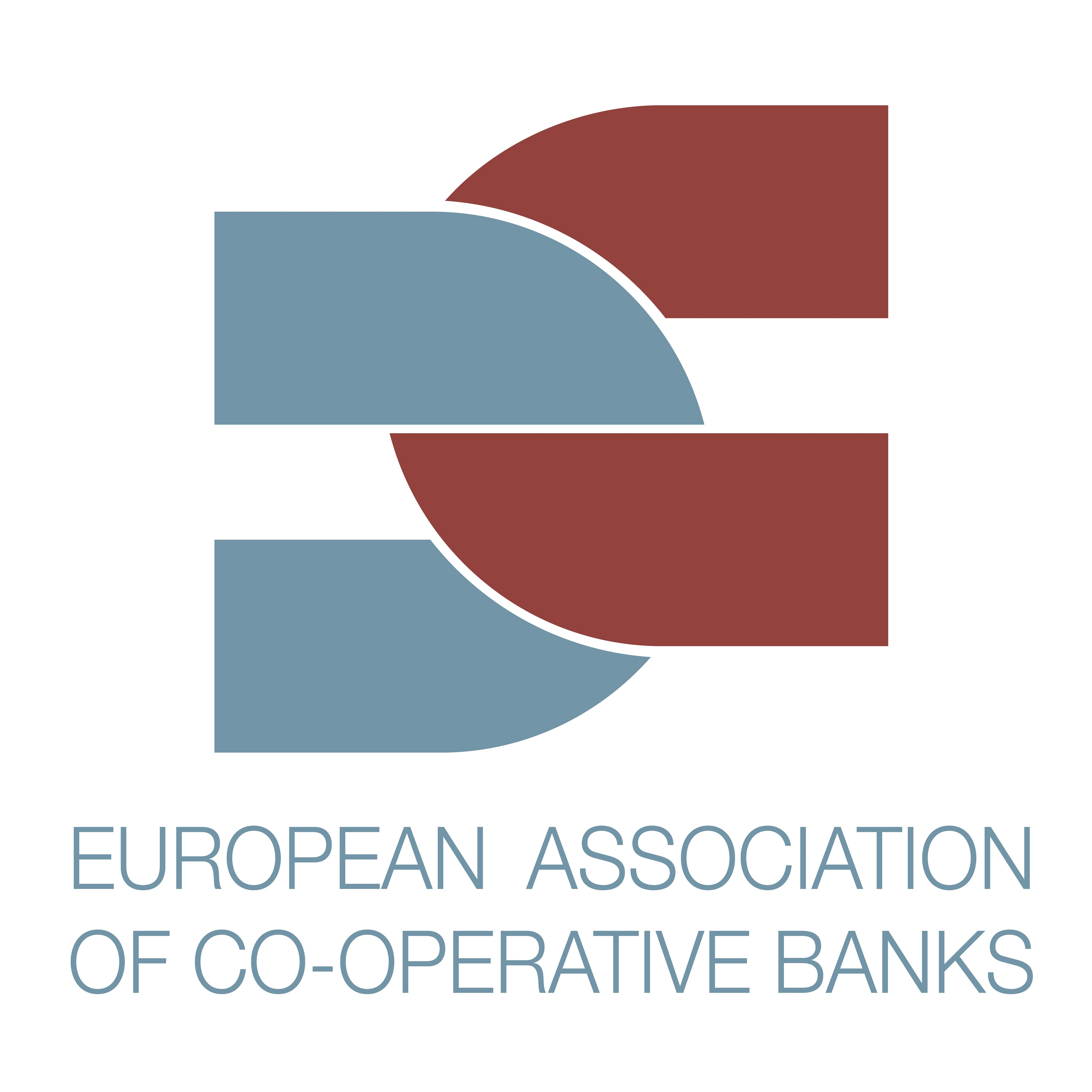
- Formation: 1970
- Legal status: International non-profit association (AISBL)
- Headquarters: Rue de l'Industrie 26-38, 1040 Brussels
- Members: 27 national associations or banks
- President: Daniel Quinten
- CEO: Nina Schindler
- Staff: 15 (2024)
- Website: eacb.coop

The European Association of Co-operative Banks (EACB) is a European interest group representing cooperative banks in the European Union (EU) and five non-European countries. Established in 1970, the non-profit association "represents, promotes and defends" the common interests of its 27 member institutions and 2.500 cooperative banks regarding banking as well as cooperative legislation.

Based in Brussels, the EACB is recognised as a key spokesperson for cooperative banks by regulators and supervisors at EU and international levels. As the representative of the world's largest cooperative banking cluster, it works together with more than 200 experts from its member organisations to substantiate the key role that cooperative banks play in the financial and economic system, and its impact value for its members, the economy as a whole and society at large.

The EACB supports the code of conduct on lobbying of the European Commission and is registered in the EU transparency register book (Transparency Book Register 4172526951-19).

== Cooperative banking in the EU ==
=== Key characteristics of cooperative banking ===
Cooperative banks are a major pillar of diversity in the European banking sector. They are banks owned and controlled by people who are also clients of the bank. As such, they are geared toward maximising member value on the long-run. More specifically, they are characterised by their member ownership model; member benefits/surplus through long-term relationship; 'One person - One vote' governance with a bottom-up approach; limited participation in profit; commitment to social values and ESG; and proximity to customers' regional presence in terms of decision-making and financing.

The cooperative model finds its origins in the cooperative movement first conceived by Friedrich Wilhelm Raiffeisen and Schulze-Delitzsch in the first half of the nineteenth century. The movement was grounded on the principles of self-help and equality to secure financial access to less privileged groups of society, especially from rural areas.

Cooperative banks today participate across four categories as regards their specific business model, the diversity and balance they bring to financial markets, long-term relationship and trust with members and customers, and their wider social impact. Their contributions may potentially add to a factor of stability due to their anti-cyclical behaviour, and are potential drivers of local and social growth for consumers, SMEs and communities.

=== Facts & figures ===
- Cooperative banks provide services to 225 million customers, mainly consumers, Small and medium-sized enterprises (SMEs) and communities.
- Cooperative banks are mutual and private banks, owned by their 89 million members.
- Cooperative banks share common values and foster local growth and entrepreneurship through their 2.500 regional and local banks and 36.500 branches.
- Cooperative banks employ 712.000 people across Europe.
- Cooperative banks manage more than €9.4 trillion in banking assets.
- Cooperative banks safeguard €5 trillion in deposits.

The information above is the latest data available compiled by EACB and Tilburg University for the year 2022. The EACB offers a comprehensive set of policy resources for cooperative banking worldwide. These resources as well as key figures and data on the cooperative banking sector are available on the EACB website (www.eacb.coop).

== About the EACB ==
=== History ===
Following an initiative launched by Johannes Teichert to create a representative body for credit cooperatives of 6 EU-member states, a first meeting with the European Commission was held in December 1969. The gathering led shortly after to the foundation of the Association of Cooperative Savings and Credit Institutions of the E.E.C on 1 October 1970. The first statues of the Association were signed at the end of 1971 by the founding members:

- Caisse Centrale des Associations Agricoles Luxembourgeoises
- Centrale Raiffeisenkas, Leuven Belgium
- Confédération Nationale du Crédit Mutuel, Paris
- Coöperatieve Centrale Boerenleenbank, Eindhoven
- Coöperatieve Centrale Raiffeisen-Bank, Utrecht
- Deutsche Genossenschaftskasse, Frankfurt
- Deutscher Raiffeisenverband, Bonn
- Ente Nazionale Delle Casse Rurale Agrari ed Ente Ausiliari, Rome
- Fédération Centrale du Crédit Agricole Mutuel, Paris
- Fédération Nationale du Crédit Agricole, Paris
- Federazione Italiana dei Consorzi Agrari, Rome
- Union du Crédit Coopératif, Paris

=== Structure ===
The European non-profit association is headed by a President and regulated by the Board and the General Assembly. The Chief Executive Officer, Ms. Nina Schindler, leads the Secretariat based in Brussels.

The General Assembly is composed of 39 Appointed Members, who endorse recommendations put forward by the Working Groups. They meet three times a year.

The activities of the EACB are articulated around Working Groups and Taskforces, covering topics from digital euro to customer policy, sustainable finance and anti-money laundering.

=== Activities of the Working Groups ===
The EACB currently has set up 14 Working Groups to advocate on a wide range of policy issues in the EU regulatory discussion. These include:

- Accounting & Audit
- Anti-Money Laundering & Financial Sanctions
- Banking Regulation
- Cooperative ID Forum
- Consumer Policy
- Corporate Governance and Company Law
- Digital euro
- Digitalisation and Use of Data
- Financial Markets
- Green and Sustainable Finance
- Payment Systems
- Recovery, Resolution and Deposit Protection
- Sustainability Reporting and Audit
- Taxation

=== Presidents ===
1970 – 1977: President Van Campen, Centrale Coöperatieve Boerenleenbank

1977 – 1981: President Braun, Crédit Mutuel

1982 – 1986: President Lardinois, Rabobank Nederland

1986 – 1989: President Schramm, BVR, Germany

1989 – 1995: President Barsalou, Crédit Agricole, Paris

1995 – 1999: President Grüger, BVR Germany

1999 – 2002: President Meijer, Rabobank Nederland

2002 – 2006: President Pflimlin, Crédit Mutuel Paris

2006 – 2008: President Pleister, BVR, Germany

2008 – 2012: President Moerland, Rabobank Nederland

2012 – 2016: President Talgorn, Crédit Agricole S.A.

2016 – 2020: President Hofmann, BVR Germany

2020 – 2023: President Marttin, Rabobank Nederland

Since 2023: President Quinten, BVR, Germany

=== Managing Directors ===
1970 – 1982: Johannes Teichert

1982 – 1996: Guido Ravoet

1996 – 2001: Johann von Süsskind

2001 – 2021: Hervé Guider

Since 2021: Nina Schindler

=== Members ===
| Country | Full Members |
|---|---|
| Austria | Fachverband der Raiffeisenbanken; Österreichischer Genossenschaftsverband (Schulze-Delitzsch) |
| Bulgaria | Central Co-operative Bank |
| Finland | OP Financial Group |
| France | Confédération Nationale du Crédit Mutuel (CNCM); Fédération Nationale du Crédit Agricole; BPCE |
| Germany | Bundesverband der Deutschen Volksbanken und Raiffeisenbanken (BVR); DZ Bank |
| Hungary | Intégralt Hitelintézetek Központi Szervezete |
| Italy | Federazione Italiana delle Banche di Credito Co-operativo- Casse Rurali ed Artigiane |
| Luxembourg | Banque Raiffeisen Luxembourg |
| The Netherlands | Rabobank |
| Poland | Krajowy Zwiazek Bankow Spoldzielczych (KZBS) |
| Portugal | Federação Nacional das Caixas de Crédito Agricola Mútuo, F.C.R.L. (FENACAM) |
| Romania | Central Co-operatist Bank Creditco-op |
| Spain | Unión Nacional de Cooperativas de Crédito (UNACC); Banco de Crédito Cooperativo (BCC) |
| | Associate Members |
| Australia | Business Council of Co-operatives and Mutuals (BCCM) |
| Belgium | CERA KBC/Ancora |
| Canada | Mouvement des Caisses Desjardins |
| Cyprus | Cyprus Asset Management Ltd |
| Denmark | Nykredit |
| Japan | Norinchukin Bank |
| Korea | Korean Federation of Community Credit Cooperatives (KFCC) |
| Switzerland | Raiffeisen Switzerland |
| United Kingdom | Building Societies Association |

== See also ==
- List of European cooperative banks
