= Martje Thalmann =

German Türmerin (born 1980)

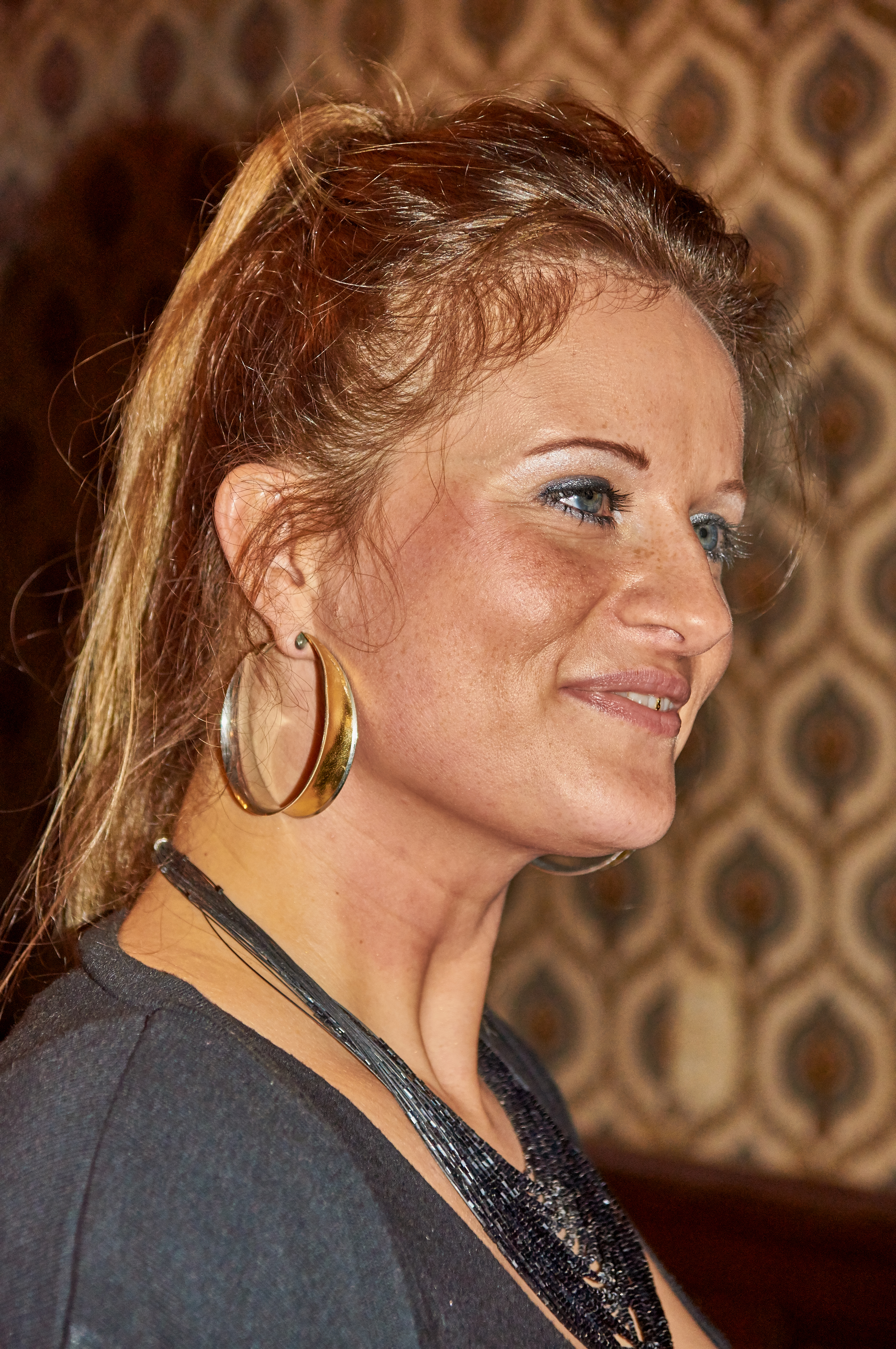
- Martje Thalmann in 2015 (photo taken by Günter “Watzmann")
- Born: Martje Saljé; 17 October 1980; Bremen, Germany
- Education: University of Oldenburg
- Occupations: Türmerin (loosely "Tower keeper"); Musician; Teacher; Archivist-curator
- Parent: Prof. Dr. Gunther Salje (1950 - 1998)

Martje Thalmann is a German Türmerin (loosely "Tower keeper"). She was appointed to the post at St. Lambert's Church, Münster in January 2014, becoming the first woman since 1383 to have held the position. Türmer and Türmerin are not officially designated job titles in Germany and it has indeed been known for tour guides to adopt the title for themselves. Thalmann is believed to be one of at least three genuine Türmer or Türmerinen in Germany who are also women. The nature of the duties has changed in recent decades; Thalmann's appointment to the St. Lambert's post was nevertheless intended to preserve an authentic tradition.

Traditionally the job involved regular ascents to the top of a high tower in order to look out and warn fellow citizens (by means of a warning horn, bell, flags and/or, after dark, flashing lights) of approaching armies in time of war, and of outbreaks of house fires at any time. At times of intensified fire risk - for instance on windy days in periods of sustained hot dry weather, or in the event of possible firebomb attacks - it became necessary for a permanent watch to be kept from the top of the tower. In many middle European towns, medieval street patterns with their narrow streets endured well into or beyond the twentieth century, and where there is no readily accessible supply of building stone, the principal building material incorporated into most surviving residential and municipal buildings is timber. (Note: A few timber built towns have survived into the twenty-first century: one of the largest and best known (and therefore, also, most dilgently restored/maintained and most popular with tourists) is Rothenburg ob der Tauber.) Many homes were heated with peat which could often nurture simmering internal hotspots for hours after the fire was believed to have finished burning, and then burst into flames after the householders had gone to bed. This translated into intensified levels of fire risk in many towns and cities. Münster's present Türmerin told an interviewer in 2015 that from her "office" at the top of the tall church tower she is still sometimes able to spot house fires and report them to the fire department, although "it does not happen so often" (es "kommt aber nicht allzu oft vor").

== Personal life ==
Martje Saljé was born in Bremen. She spent a large part of her childhood living in Norway, and also lived for a time in Canada. Her father, Gunther Salje, worked as professor of film and theatre. As a small child she had an appetite for performing, mastering a range of instruments including piano, guitar, double bass, flute, renaissance lute, accordion and cello. While she was growing up, membership of the local church community provided ample opportunity for helping to shape the music in the church, performing in bands and, beyond the musical scene, for engaging in youth work more broadly. After leaving school she studied history and music at the University of Oldenburg. She continues to pursue music as a hobby, fixing her own settings and improvisations on the "rules" identified and codified by Bach. (Note: "Musik war früher mein Lebensinhalt, und heute ist sie mein Hobby.") She has performed on international tours in France, Belgium, Italy, Britain and Poland: she has worked with rock groups, dance troupes and jazz ensembles.

After leaving university, Thalmann worked in museums and archive departments and in teaching. She also continued to support herself as an itinerant musician.

Thalmann is Protestant, but has no issues with the fact that she works in the tower of a Catholic church. She has said she enjoys feeling "a bit closer to Heaven" ("...dem Himmel ein Stück näher...") in her little office high above the city streets.

Thalmann also runs a blog about Münster, and sees herself as a cultural ambassador: "Through my own blog [from my office in the tower] to the outside world I publicise the city's traditions ... I enter into real-time dialogue with other people and win for Münster and for St. Lambert's the interest of a completely new target group". (Note: "Ich trage durch einen eigenen Blog nach außen, welche Tradition Münster hat ... Dadurch trete ich in Echtzeit in Dialog mit anderen Menschen und gewinne für Münster und die Lambertikirche das Interesse von ganz neuen Zielgruppen.") She also operates a Facebook page from the tower. She also sees herself as an advocate and representative for the tower, taking part in media interviews and presentations, and performing in charity events on behalf of the church or the city. In 2017, discussions recently arose as to whether the church tower should be used to exhibit to passers-by the three cages used to display the tortured corpses of 16th-century rebels. Thalmann spoke against their removal: "They are part of the city's history, and it would be disingenuous to remove them. You cannot explain everything through the prism of twenty-first century norms. They must stay there to generate discussions and support opinions. Münster can handle that!". (Note: "Sie sind Teil der Stadtgeschichte, und es wäre falsch, sie abzuhängen“, erklärt Saljé. „Nicht alles ist mit heutigen Maßstäben zu erklären. Sie müssen da sein, damit man über sie diskutieren und sich eine Meinung bilden kann. Münster hält das aus".) She has also researched city history and works on website maintenance and development.

== Türmerin duties ==
Her application to take over the post of Türmerin (loosely "Tower keeper") was one of forty-six. Her fellow applicants included six other women. The post is a public-sector part-time position without the statutory notice period applicable to full-time positions, and involves extensive night-time and weekend working. Thalmann therefore combines the post with a second, more conventional part-time position as a worker with the local Sparda-Bank: "something completely different, involving computers" ("Etwas ganz anderes, was mit Computern"). When asked how long she intends to continue with her work as Türmerin: "My predecessor carried on till his seventieth year. I might carry on for even longer if my joints hold out". (Note: "Mein Vorgänger war bis zu seinem 70. Lebensjahr Türmer. Das kann ich, wenn meine Gelenke das mitmachen, sogar noch übertreffen".)

Thalmann's daily duties begin each day (except on Tuesdays, which are silent) at 20.30, with a walk up the 300 steps to her office, 75 meters up in the church tower. The climb takes her past the base of the flag pole that emerges at the top of the tower, past the three suspended cages that were used to display the tortured corpses of anabaptist rebels after the suppression of the 1535 Münster rebellion, and past the so-called "council and fire bells” (German: Rats- und Brandglocke) which in modern times are sounded only for mayoral elections. The office is positioned 25 meters below the tip of the spire that tops off the church tower. It is a narrow room, about the size of a typical student room, and contains a desk, two chairs, and a bookcase.

Her first task each evening is to telephone the fire station to confirm that she is stationed for her shift in the tower. Every half hour between 21.00 and midnight she sounds the "tower horn" three times, facing in succession south, west and north. She does not sound the horn towards the east, because in that direction there used to be a large cemetery and, by tradition, it is not part of her responsibility to disturb the souls of the dead. An alternative explanation involves a rich and powerful man who used to live to the east of the tower and did not wish to be disturbed. In former times the horn was sounded regularly through the night between 22.00 and 06.00. The present instrument is made of copper and dates from 1950: it is based on a sixteenth century design. The tone resembles the blast from a ships horn, sounding a low C.

Those regular steady horn blasts traditionally reassure the citizens of Münster that they are facing neither an imminent fire in the city nor the approach of enemies from beyond the (imaginary) city walls. The number of the blasts represents the time. At 21.00 there are nine blasts, with a brief pause after each batch of three. At 22.00 there are ten blasts, with a brief pause after the first two batches of three, followed by a third batch of four blasts. ("One has to breathe whilst blowing the horn! 2 Tootings are easy, 3 ooookay, 4 dang! any longer and the Tuermerin might feel somewhat giddy".) The same pattern is followed until midnight (twelve blasts in four batches of three) after which, in modern times, the citizens can spend the rest of the night undisturbed by Thalmann's "tower horn". Interviewed in May 2015, after just fifteen months in the job, Thalmann reported that she had already spotted several fires while on watch. Under these circumstances her first duty is to telephone the fire station to alert them to as many details as she can determine from her vantage point. After that she takes up her "tower horn". Instead of the steady long blasts she uses to communicate the time, she communicates the emergency with an urgent succession of staccato notes.
