= Targobank =

German bank

Coordinates: 51.2242°N 6.7760°E

Targobank AG
- Industry: Bank
- Founded: 1926
- Headquarters: Düsseldorf
- Number of locations: 340
- Key people: Isabelle Chevelard (CEO); Christophe Jéhan; René Dangel (Chairman of the Supervisory Board); Birgit Paul
- Total assets: €44,9 billion (2024)
- Number of employees: 7,400 (2024)
- Parent: Crédit Mutuel Alliance Fédérale (since 2008)
- Website: www.targobank.de

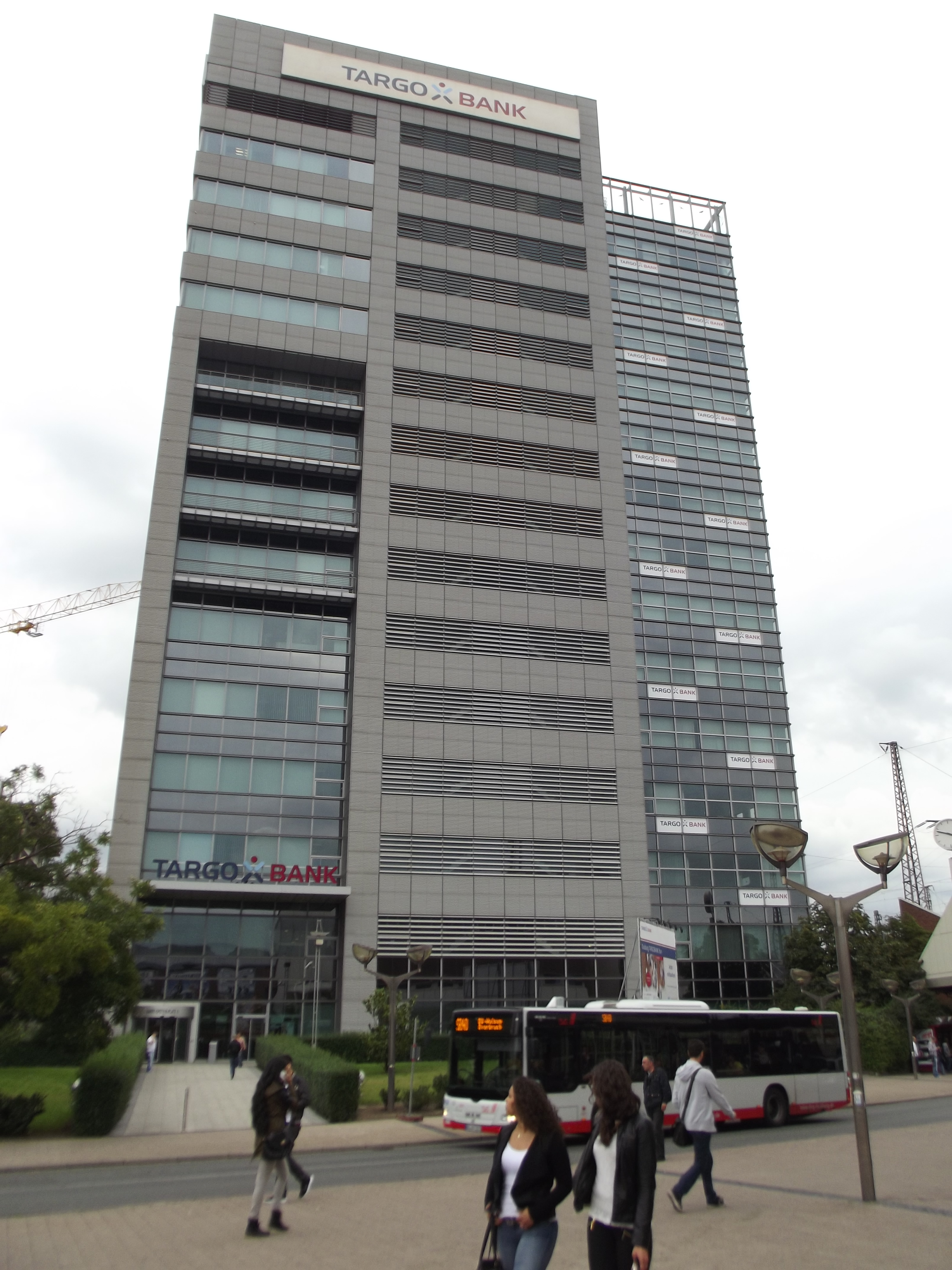
Office building Targobank in Duisburg

Targobank AG (stylized as TARGOBANK) is a bank operating in Germany, headquartered in Düsseldorf, with its customer service centre in Duisburg. Since 2008 it is part of the French Crédit Mutuel Alliance Féderale banking group. Until 1991, it operated under the name Kundenkreditbank, and from then until 2010, it traded as Citibank Privatkunden AG & Co. KGaA. With around 3.8 million customers (as of 2024), the bank is among the major providers of retail, business, and corporate banking services in Germany and operates 340 branches in over 250 cities across the country. It was initially active in the retail banking sector. Since its acquisition in 2008 by Crédit Mutuel Alliance Féderale, the institution has increasingly developed into a universal bank.

== History ==
=== Foundation of Kunden-Kredit-Bank ===
In 1926, the Königsberg-based merchant Walter Kaminsky, together with 20 other retailers, founded Kunden-Kredit-Bank GmbH as the first German instalment payment bank. The bank issued loans ranging from 50 to 2,000 Reichsmark directly to private individuals, in the form of payment orders. These allowed customers to shop at specific retailers and repay the purchase amount in monthly instalments. Kunden-Kredit-Bank was thus the first German bank to grant loans exclusively to private individuals, making it the first institution dedicated solely to retail banking. From 1935, the bank operated under the name Kundenkreditbank, with its headquarters in Düsseldorf. The previously separate regional banks in Dortmund and Düsseldorf were merged into the new KKB Kundenkreditbank KGaA on 27 September 1951. In 1955, Kundenkreditbank was listed on the Düsseldorf Stock Exchange. By the late 1960s, KKB repositioned itself and oriented its services towards private households. It opened new branches, offered bank accounts, and accepted savings deposits. From 1968 onwards, it operated as a full-service bank for private customers.

=== Acquisition by First National City Bank of New York ===
In 1973, 56% of KKB was acquired by the American First National City Bank of New York (later Citigroup), and the bank was renamed KKB Kundenkreditbank – Deutsche Haushaltsbank. However, First National continued to operate its retail banking business in Germany under the original name. The second major shareholder of KKB, Trinkaus & Burkhardt, was acquired by First National City Bank of New York in 1974, with a 51% stake. As a result, KKB provided a number of business principles that influenced the core operations of First National during the 1970s. In 1976, First National City Bank was renamed Citibank, N.A. in the United States. By 1989, Citibank had increased its stake in KKB to approximately 97% of the shares.

Planned in 1985 and launched in 1988, KKB introduced the world’s first and, for a long time, only large-scale, knowledge-based advisory system on a mainframe platform, known as “Ramses”. Further smaller knowledge-based applications were subsequently developed.

=== Continuation of business as Citibank Privatkunden AG ===
In 1991, Citibank renamed its German operations, including KKB, to Citibank Privatkunden AG. In December of the same year, the bank, now operating under the name Citibank, opened its first branch in former East Berlin. In 1993, the company was restructured to comply with EU Directive 93/6/EEC on the adequate capital of investment firms and credit institutions. As part of this restructuring, the bank’s data centre in Meerbusch became the central hub for all transactions across Europe.

In 1999, the Duisburg customer service centre was opened. Subsequently, administration tasks of other branches were consolidated there. Since the early 2000s, Citibank had been known for giving out loans with too high interest to private customers with bad credit rating. In 2003, the bank was renamed Citibank Privatkunden AG & Co. KGaA.

=== Takeover by Crédit Mutuel and establishment of business activities as Targobank ===
In the context of the 2008 financial crisis, Citibank Privatkunden was put up for sale by Citigroup. The retail banking business of Citibank Privatkunden became part of the French cooperative banking group Crédit Mutuel on 5 December 2008. The purchase price was €4.9 billion, in addition to the profits generated during the 2008 financial year up to the point of the acquisition. Its range of services in retail banking was divided into five business areas: accounts and cards, saving and investments, protection and provision, wealth, as well as loans and financing.

The brands “Citi”, “Citibank”, and “Citibank with Arc Design” were initially continued by Crédit Mutuel under licence from Citigroup Inc. Citibank itself remained in Frankfurt am Main for its corporate banking operations, under the name Citigroup Global Market Deutschland AG. The name change associated with the sale was entered into the commercial register on 28 January 2010. From 22 February 2010, Crédit Mutuel’s subsidiary in Germany operated solely under the name Targobank. The word Targo is purely an artificial word which was created for the business by ad writer Manfred Gotta and was meant to raise worldwide acceptance of the company.

=== Transformation into a universal bank ===
Supported by its French parent company, the Düsseldorf-based institution announced its intention to acquire the retail banking business of Valovis Bank (formerly Karstadt-Quelle-Bank) in December 2013. Since May 2014, this business—particularly the credit card segment with around 800,000 customers—had been part of Targobank. The acquired business led to Targobank becoming the third-largest provider in the credit card sector. At the same time, the second phase of entry into the market for independent car dealer financing began, following the bank’s initial entry into the online car loan business two years earlier. In 2015, Targobank established its own automotive bank.

In August 2016, the leasing and factoring business of German GE Capital—operating under the name GE Commercial Finance and part of the financial arm of the General Electric Group—was acquired and subsequently operated as Targo Commercial Finance, based in Mainz. Targo Commercial Finance merged with Targobank in January 2018. In the same year, following the successful completion of a pilot phase, a new product and service offering for business customers was launched nationwide. It was aimed at the self-employed and freelancers.

In October 2022, it was announced that BECM Deutschland, the German branch network and corporate banking business of the French Banque Européenne du Crédit Mutuel (BECM), would be integrated into the German Targobank Group and continue under the new company name Targobank Corporate & Institutional Banking, or Targobank CIB. This integration was part of Targobank’s development from a retail-focused bank into a universal bank.

Targobank Spain, a bank with €6 billion assets, was purchased by Abanca on 6 October 2023.

The development into a universal bank continued, and in March 2025, Targobank announced its intention to acquire Oldenburgische Landesbank (OLB) for €2 billion.

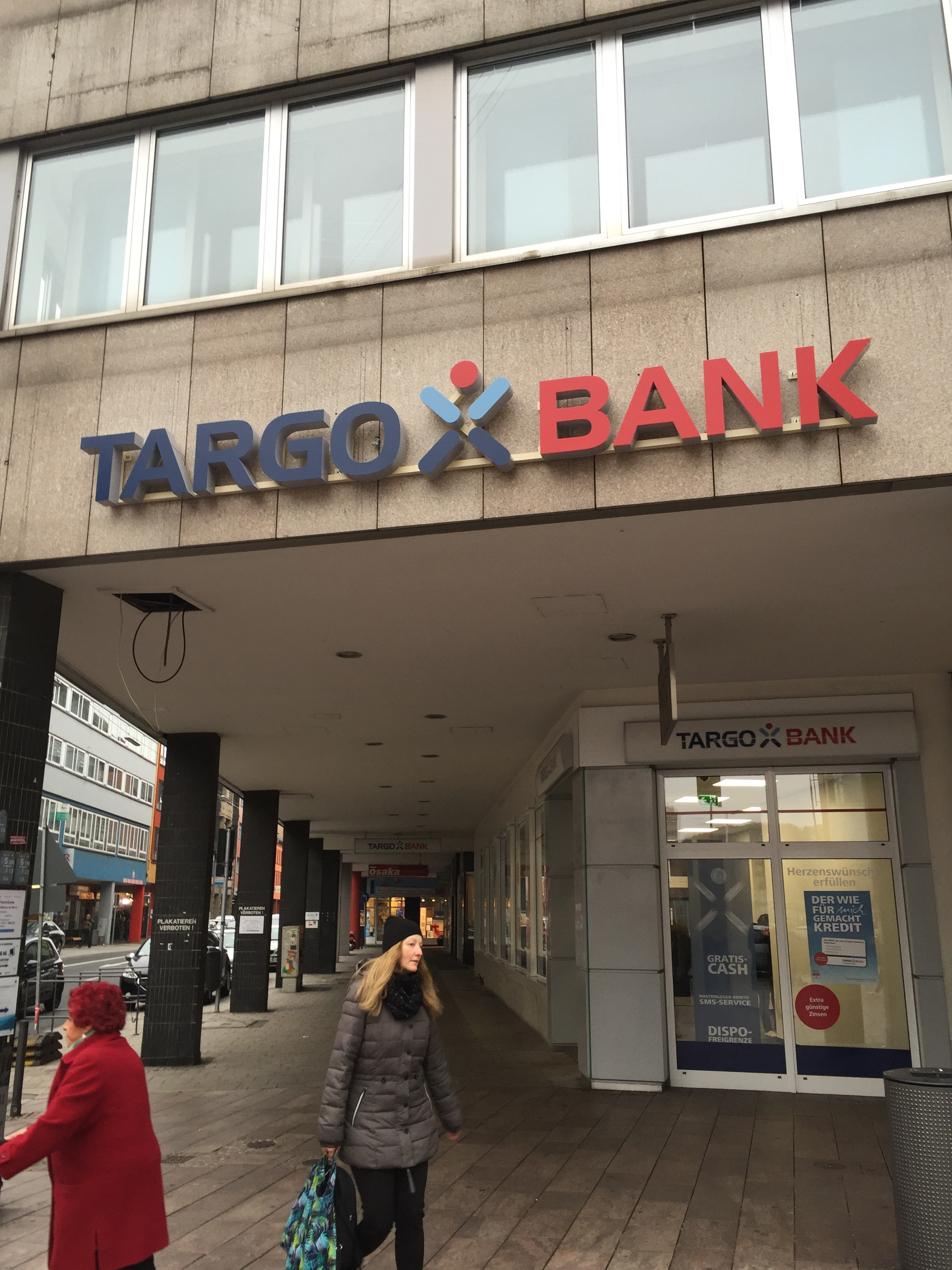
Targobank branch

On 2 January 2026, Crédit Mutuel announced the completion of the acquisition of OLB, through Targobank.

== Business activities ==
Targobank is part of Groupe Crédit Mutuel, a cooperative banking group based in France. Originally, Targobank was primarily positioned as a retail bank, particularly in the area of consumer credit. With additional services for business and corporate clients, Targobank has taken steps towards becoming a bank with a broader range of activities. Targobank has around 3.8 million private, business, and corporate clients and, in 2024, recorded a pre-tax profit of €607 million (according to IFRS) on total assets of €44.9 billion. The bank employs 7,400 staff and is one of the larger banking employers in the financial centre of Düsseldorf. The Chair of the Management Board is Isabelle Chevelard. The Supervisory Board is chaired by René Dangel.

The bank operates three business segments: retail customers, business customers, and corporate clients. The first segment covers lending, deposit-taking, payment transactions, securities business, and insurance brokerage, and is divided into the following five areas: accounts & cards, loans & financing, wealth advisory, saving & investments, and protection & provision. In the second segment, the bank offers loans, payment accounts, credit cards, and call money accounts for business purposes to small and micro-enterprises (including the self-employed). The range of services in the third segment – through the Targobank Corporate & Institutional Banking division – includes corporate and special financing for the upper midmarket and financing for commercial property as well as payment transactions and investment products. Targobank also offers financing products in the areas of Receivable Finance, Equipment Finance and Investment Finance for companies. The range for corporate customers is supplemented by sales and goods purchase financing for retailers (Sales Finance) and, with the help of Targobank Autobank, vehicle purchase and sales financing for car dealers.

== Sponsorship ==
From July 2007, German Citibank was a sponsor of the football club SV Werder Bremen. For five years, it was the main and shirt sponsor. During this period, Citibank underwent a transition, which led to the players temporarily wearing the advertising slogan “So geht Bank heute” (“This is how banking works today”) on their shirts instead of the company name, before switching to the Targobank logo at the start of the 2010/2011 season.

In the 2012/13 season, the company became an official partner of the DFB-Pokal. The bank held the rights for all 63 matches of the competition, including TV visibility through pitchside advertising. The contract was subsequently extended twice, meaning Targobank will remain an official partner of the DFB-Pokal until 2026.

Since the 2023/2024 season, Targobank has been shirt sponsor of the second-division football club Fortuna Düsseldorf and one of the main sponsors of the “Fortuna für alle” (“Fortuna for All”) project. Among other things, the project enables free admission to some of Fortuna's home matches.

== Social engagement ==
Targobank is committed to social causes primarily through its own Targobank Foundation and the foundation of its parent company, the Fondation Crédit Mutuel Alliance Fédérale. The Targobank Foundation's aim is to promote equal opportunities and self-determination by providing people in Germany with an understanding of economic contexts and financial fundamentals. The foundation therefore supports projects in areas such as environmental and climate protection, health protection, and financial education. Since 2003, the foundation has supported, among other initiatives, the project “Fit für die Wirtschaft” (“Fit for Business”), a modular teaching concept for pupils in years 8 to 10 aimed at conveying financial topics. The bank also organises the annual “Targobank Run” and the “DU_Kultur|en_Festival” in Duisburg.

The Fondation Crédit Mutuel Alliance Fédérale was established in 2021. Its main purpose is to support climate protection and projects that promote social and cultural inclusion.

== Criticism ==
The image of the former Citibank Germany, which was named “Germany’s most customer-oriented bank” in 2006 by the University of St. Gallen, Handelsblatt, and Steria Mummert Consulting, has also been accompanied by controversy over the years (e.g. consumer protection and Plusminus). Due to its bad image, in 2004, Citibank initiated a new international campaign Unsere gemeinsame Verantwortlichkeit.

In the course of the breakdown of the American investment bank Lehman Brothers on September 15, 2008, Citibank was criticised in Germany again. According to numerous media reports certificates by Lehman Brothers were sold especially in Citibank branches as a secure investment to private customers – among them many pensioners – who as a result were confronted with the total loss of their investment. It was said that in Germany alone about 50,000 people were affected and the majority were Citibank customers. According to media reports, financial experts accused Citibank as leading sales partner of Lehman Brothers of providing fresh capital for the investment bank by massively pushing sales of Lehman certificates in Germany. On May 28, 2009, Citibank announced a successful end to long negotiations with the consumer assistance office NRW with which the bank agreed on a curtesy arrangement of €27 million. This agreement was positively reflected on by the media, but the syndicate of Lehman-victims criticized the agreement as insufficient and mainly beneficial for the bank. They criticized that the curtesy offer would only equal 5% of the approximate total damage of €475 million and even according to Citibanks own calculations around two thirds of damaged customers would get nothing. The compensation model looks at a multi-step refund of 30 up to 80% for those cases which are about existence threatening sums and it involves extensive exclusion criteria. The detailed criteria were published on the website of the consumer assistance office NRW. In fall 2009, the North Rhine-Westphalia consumer assistance office found that 15 banks were not passing on lower refinancing costs to their customers, including Citibank with an overdraft interest rate of 16.99% for its Extra account. In 2010, it issued warnings to three banks, taking legal action against two of them: Targobank and Sparda-Bank Münster. In December 2011, the Regional Court of Düsseldorf decided that Targobank's interest clause was illegitimate and Targobank's attempt to have the judgment reversed failed. Due to the rebranding from Citibank to Targobank, consumerists criticised that the earlier transition from KKB to Citibank in 1991 had not changed the criticism of the credit business. They argued that the business model would only aim at acquiring new credit customers and turning them into long-term debtors.

== See also ==
- List of banks in Germany
