= CashPool =

German interbank network

- Operating area: Germany
- Members: 29
- ATMs: approx. 2,800
- Founded: 2000

CashPool is a cooperation of a multitude of smaller or virtual German private banks, in which they mutually waive ATM usage fees for their customers. It is not an interbank network but uses the pre-existing German ATM or Maestro/Cirrus networks. With more than 2800 ATMs, the cooperating banks' ATM networks form the smallest ATM group in Germany.

The cooperation was founded in 2000. Its primary competitor in Germany is Cash Group.

== Background ==
Most banks in Germany, while connected through the German ATM network, charge ATM usage fees for customers of other banks.

In 1998, the six largest German private banks established Cash Group, mutually waiving these fees within the Group.

After the formation, other private banks tried to join Cash Group but were not accepted into the Group. Being smaller than the six large private banks, they operated fewer ATMs and thus would have unilaterally benefited from the use of the other bank's larger networks.

As a consequence, several of these smaller banks founded CashPool and also mutually waived ATM usage fees within the group. For comparison, the big banks' Cash Group network has over 4,500 ATMs, the co-operative banks (as members of the Bankcard-Servicenetz) share 13,791 ATMs (as of 2025), and the savings banks operate approximately 19,650 ATMs (as of 2023) for their SparkassenCard.

The private banks (but not the savings banks and cooperative banks) had undertaken to charge a maximum of EUR 1.95 for payments to third-party customers from January 2011. In August 2015, Deutsche Bank, Postbank and Commerzbank terminated the voluntary commitment. The banks involved in Cashpool (listed below) currently have around 2,800 ATMs in Germany, of which around 160 locations are not publicly accessible because they are located on company premises or in a company building. There is no nationwide supply or even distribution. So there are in Nuremberg, for example, there are around 20 ATMs (¾ of which are publicly accessible and also unevenly distributed within the city area), while the nearest ATM in the Sylt holiday region is only about 70 km away in Flensburg.

=== Current members ===
- Anton Hafner OHG, Bankgeschäft, Augsburg
- Bank für Sozialwirtschaft AG, Cologne
- Bankhaus Bauer, Stuttgart
- Bankhaus C. L. Seeliger, Wolfenbüttel
- Bankhaus E. Mayer AG, Freiburg im Breisgau
- Bankhaus Gebr. Martin AG, Göppingen
- Bankhaus J. Faisst OHG, Wolfach
- Bankhaus Ludwig Sperrer KG, Freising
- Bankhaus Max Flessa KG, Schweinfurt
- Bank Schilling & Co. AG, Hammelburg
- Bankverein Werther AG, Werther, North Rhine-Westphalia
- BBBank eG, Karlsruhe
- Citibank Privatkunden AG & Co. KGaA, Düsseldorf
- Degussa Bank GmbH, Frankfurt am Main
- Donner & Reuschel AG, Hamburg
- Fürstlich Castell’sche Bank, Credit-Casse AG, Würzburg
- Gabler-Saliter Bankgeschäft KG, Obergünzburg
- GE Money Bank GmbH, Hannover
- Joh. Berenberg, Gossler & Co. KG, Hamburg
- Merkur Bank KGaA, Munich
- National-Bank AG, Essen
- netbank AG, Hamburg
- Oldenburgische Landesbank AG, Oldenburg
- Pax-Bank eG, Cologne
- Santander Consumer Bank AG, Mönchengladbach
- SEB AG, Frankfurt am Main
- Sparda Banken-Gruppe
- Steyler Bank GmbH, Sankt Augustin
- Südwestbank AG, Stuttgart
- Targobank, Düsseldorf

=== Former Members ===
- SchmidtBank KGaA, Hof
- Baden-Württembergische Bank AG (BW-Bank), Stuttgart
- Erste Rosenheimer Privatbank AG, Rosenheim
- Norisbank, Bonn
- CVW-Privatbank AG, Wilhermsdorf
- readybank ag, Berlin
- Wüstenrot Bank AG Pfandbriefbank, Ludwigsburg
