= Wildparkstadion =

Football stadium in Karlsruhe, Germany

BBBank Wildpark
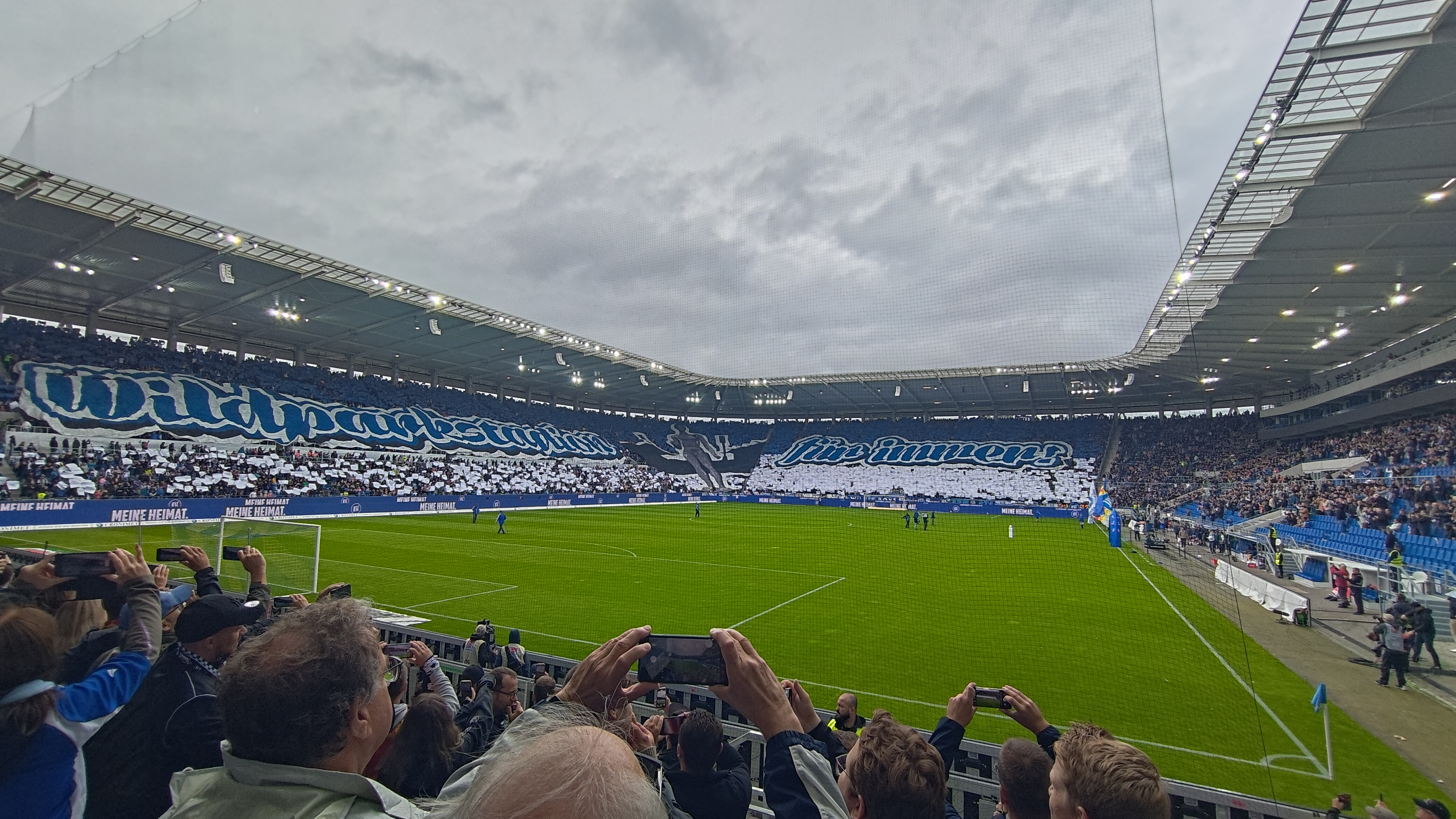
- Wildparkstadion in 2023
- Interactive map of BBBank Wildpark
- Former names: Wildparkstadion (1955–2021)
- Location: Adenauerring 17; 76131 Karlsruhe, Baden-Württemberg, Germany
- Coordinates: 49°1′12″N 8°24′47″E
- Owner: Stadt Karlsruhe (City of Karlsruhe)
- Operator: Eigenbetrieb Fußballstadion im Wildpark
- Capacity: 33,180
- Surface: Natural Grass
- Field size: 105 x 68 m

Construction
- Opened: 7 August 1955
- Renovated: 1978, 1986, 1991–1993, 2018–2023
- Reopened: 19 July 2023
- Cost: €143 million ($136 million)
- Architects: Thomas Großmann; Lucy Hillebrand (1993); AGN Niederberghaus & Partner GmbH (2018)

Tenant
- Karlsruher SC (1955–present)

Wildparkstadion, currently known as BBBank Wildpark for sponsorship reasons, is a football stadium located in Karlsruhe, Germany. It is the home of the football club Karlsruher SC.

== History ==
The stadium is located northeast of the Karlsruhe Palace (Schloss) and is part of the former deer park (Wildpark) of the Grand Dukes of Baden in the Hardtwald, hence the name. There have been football pitches at the location since 1922, and the stadium was built in 1955, with several major renovations since.

A decision to rebuild the stadium was taken in 2006. The City of Karlsruhe and Karlsruher SC became engulfed in disputes about finances and finally abandoned the project in 2014. Two years later, the city again decided to renew the stadium, using the existing site and financed mostly by the city. In November 2018, demolition of parts of the old stadium and the current construction of a new 34,302-seat arena began. Works are being carried out in stages so that matches can be played on the existing pitch in front of at least 15,000 spectators. The new Wildparkstadion is expected to be completed in the first half of 2023 at a projected cost of €155 Million. In 2021, it was announced that BBBank had acquired the naming rights to the stadium for five years.

On 19 July 2023, Karlsruher SC opened the new stadium against Liverpool in a pre-season friendly that the latter won 4–2.

In March 2024, BBBank Wildpark was voted second (21,218 points) in the StadiumDB.com “Stadium of the Year 2023” poll, behind Arena MRV (25,515 points), home of Atlético Mineiro in Belo Horizonte.
