= Sparda =

Sparda may refer to:

- Sparda, the Old Persian name for Lydia
- Sparda (Devil May Cry), a video game character
- Sparda-Bank, a group of German and Austrian cooperative banks
