= Bundesverband der Deutschen Volksbanken und Raiffeisenbanken =

Association of co-operative banks in Germany

National Association of German Cooperative Banks
- Native name: Bundesverband der Deutschen Volksbanken und Raiffeisenbanken
- Founded: 1972
- Headquarters: Berlin (Bonn until 2001)
- Key people: Gerhard Hofmann and Andreas Martin, co-Chairs; Marija Kolak, President
- Website: www.bvr.de

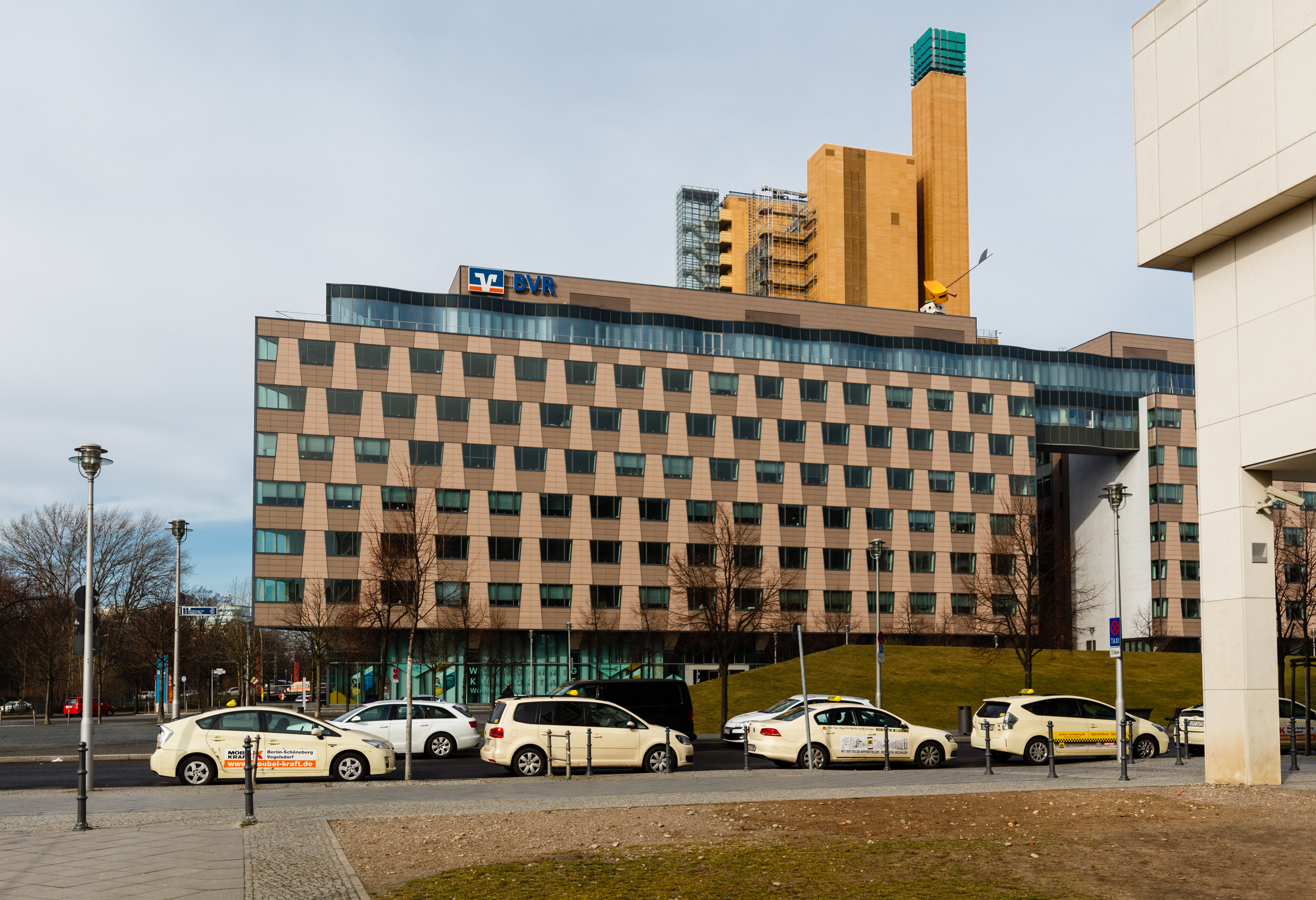
BVR headquarters in Berlin

The National Association of German Cooperative Banks (German: Bundesverband der Deutschen Volksbanken und Raiffeisenbanken, BVR) is the umbrella association for the German Cooperative Financial Group. Its origins go back to 1864 as Allgemeiner Verband der auf Selbsthilfe beruhenden Deutschen Erwerbs- und Wirtschaftsgenossenschaften. As of 2015 it had 1,021 members, which represents all the cooperative banks in Germany, including local cooperative banks, PSD banks, Sparda banks, Church banks and Cooperative financial institutions, managing around 1.200 trillion euros.

The BVR represents the interests of the German Cooperative Financial Institutions at both national and international levels and coordinates and develops the joint strategy within the Network. The BVR advises and supports its members on legal, taxation, and business management issues.

The Cooperative Financial Group's institutional protection scheme is Germany's oldest deposit guarantee scheme for banks and is run by the BVR. The BVR informs its member banks on economic and political developments and publishes the “Bank-Information” newsletter. European affairs are dealt with by a representation in Brussels. The BVR is member of the European Association of Co-operative Banks (EACB).

== Structure ==
Board of Managing Directors, Association Council, Administrative Board, and general meeting of members – these four governing bodies carry out the BVR's duties as an association.

=== Board of Managing Directors ===
The three-strong Board of Managing Directors, which is appointed by the Administrative Board, manages the BVR's business operations and represents the BVR externally.

=== Administrative Board ===
The Administrative Board is composed of 12 members of the Association Council. The Administrative Board advises the Board of Managing Directors on matters of banking business and banking policy. It also has the job of supervising the Board of Managing Directors and monitors how the Board of Managing Directors runs the protection scheme. Chairman of the administrative board is in accordance with the Articles of Association the respective chairman of the association council.

==== Chairman ====
- Carsten Graaf (2008–Present)
- Fritz Bokelmann (2003–2007)
- Rainer Märklin (1994–2002)

=== Association Council ===
The Association Council comprises up to 50 members, 12 of whom make up the Administrative Board. The Association Council decides on the Network's strategic direction. It approves the strategic projects devised by special committees. The Chairman of the Association Council takes over with its election in accordance with the Articles of Association at the same time the chairmanship of the Administrative Board.

=== General meeting of members ===
The place for democratic decision-making in the Cooperative Financial Network is the general meeting of members, at which every institution has a vote, irrespective of its size. It convenes at least once a year.

== Cooperative Technology Companies ==
- Bankcard-Servicenetz CardProcess GmbH
- F-Call AG
- Atruvia AG
- IT-Chain GmbH
- ORGA Gesellschaft für automatische Datenverarbeitung mbH
- parcIT GmbH
- Ratiodata SE

== See also ==
- Credit Union
- Volksbank
- Raiffeisenbank
- List of banks in Germany
