= Santander Consumer Bank (Germany) =

German credit institution

Coordinates: 51.195099°N 6.423129°E

Santander Consumer Bank AG
- Type: Corporation
- Founded: 20 August 1957
- Headquarters: Mönchengladbach, Germany
- Total assets: €43 billion (2018)
- Number of employees: 3,401 (2018)
- Parent: Banco Santander
- Website: www.santander.de

Logo until 2018

Santander Consumer Bank AG, trading as Openbank Deutschland is a German credit institution in the legal form of a corporation with headquarters in Mönchengladbach. It is a wholly owned subsidiary of the Spanish Banco Santander S.A.

The Santander Group is one of the largest banks in the world with over 133 million customers and presence in more than 40 countries. In Germany, the bank is represented by the Santander Consumer Bank AG. The Santander Consumer Bank AG has a loan portfolio of €30.8 billion and has about 5.6 million customers.

The business model of Santander Consumer Bank AG is based on three pillars: retail banking, vehicle financing and consumer financing. The Santander Consumer Bank AG is the largest manufacturer-independent bank in the field of car, motorcycle, and (motor) caravan financing and maintains ten dealer sales centers in the metropolitan areas of Hamburg, Frankfurt, Leipzig, Munich, Hanover, Berlin, Stuttgart and Mönchengladbach. The consumer financing business focuses on the consumer electronics, computer and furniture retail sectors.

The Santander Consumer Bank AG has 211 branches in Germany (as of 31 December 2017). All banking services are also offered directly via online and telephone banking. In total, Santander employs 3,672 people in Germany.

The Santander Consumer Bank AG is a member of CashPool, the Bankenfachverband e.V., the Bankenarbeitsgemeinschaft e.V. and the Verband deutscher Pfandbriefbanken. Santander is affiliated to the Deposit Guaranty Fund of the Bundesverband deutscher Banken.

== History ==
Historical company logo

The bank was founded in 1957 as Curt Briechle KG Absatzfinanzierung by businessman Curt Briechle in Mönchengladbach as a sales financing company for automobiles. In 1968, the company was converted into a public limited company and renamed Bankhaus Centrale Credit AG.

In 1987, the Spanish bank Banco Santander Central Hispano (BSCH) acquired 100% of the bank and renamed it CC-Bank AG. In 1988, the Royal Bank of Scotland acquired 50% of the CC-Bank's shares. In 1996, the Santander Central Hispano bought back the shares from the Royal Bank of Scotland.

In 2002, the Cologne-based AKB Privat- und Handelsbank merged with the CC-Bank AG. The Cologne headquarter of AKB at Friesenplatz was dissolved. In 2003, the Santander Direkt Bank AG from Frankfurt, which also belonged to the BSCH-Group, was merged with the CC-Bank.

As of 1 October 2004, the bank's market presence was adapted to the corporate design of the Spanish parent company. Since then, the name of the brand was Santander Consumer CC-Bank; for the time being the official company name remained CC-Bank AG. In August 2007 the official renaming in the commercial register to Santander Consumer Bank AG was made.

On 1 July 2008, the Royal Bank of Scotland sold its consumer credit business unit ECF (European Consumer Finance) to Santander Consumer Finance. This included RBS (RD Europe) GmbH with branches in Ratingen (Germany), Houten (Netherlands), Merelbeke (Belgium) and Vienna (Austria), which now belong to the German Santander Consumer Holding GmbH. With the purchase the ComfortCard brand in those countries was also taken over.

As of 1 July 2009, GE Money Bank GmbH in Hanover, which was acquired in November 2008, was merged with the Santander Consumer Bank AG.

In July 2010 it was announced that the German private customer business of SEB will be sold to Banco Santander. The purchase price for the 173 SEB branches amounted to €555 million. As of 31 January 2011, the private customer business with about 1 million customers and about 2,400 employees was transferred to Santander and now operates under Santander Bank – Zweigniederlassung der Santander Consumer Bank AG.

On 1 July 2016, a joint venture in which the Santander Consumer Bank AG holds a 50 percent stake, was launched by the PSA Bank Deutschland GmbH. The PSA Bank offers car financing, leasing products and dealer financing with the Peugeot Bank and Citroën Bank brands. Deposits are available through the PSA Direct Bank.

In September 2016, the bank obtained the license to issue bonds. At the end of November 2017, the bank issued a bond certificate for the first time.

In 2018, the Santander Consumer Bank AG will unify its brand image and will only perform in Germany as "Santander". As a result, the distribution networks of "Santander Consumer Bank", "Santander Direkt Bank" and "Santander Bank" are merged.

== Corporate Office and New Work Concept ==
As the number of employees rose to more than 1,300 after the merger with AKB Bank and as they worked at five different locations in Mönchengladbach, a new corporate headquarter was built at Karmannsstraße in Mönchengladbach by mid-2007 at the address Santander-Platz 1.

In the building planned by the architects Hentrich-Petschnigg & Partner, the employees of the Santander Consumer Bank AG are to work with the so-called New Work concept. Meeting rooms for larger groups or small rooms, so-called "think tanks", for 1 to 3 persons are used for communication as well as "chillout lounges" or coffee bars.

Between 2013 and 2015, another complex of buildings was built on Madrider Straße in the Nordpark within sight of the Mönchengladbach stadium. Its shape and layout are based on the corporate headquarters at Santander-Platz.

== Engagement ==
The Santander Universities global business unit partners with more than 1,200 academic institutions in 20 countries worldwide, including the German Universities of Bremen, Heidelberg, Cologne, the Humboldt University of Berlin, Free University of Berlin, University of Düsseldorf, Justus Liebig University Giessen, Goethe University Frankfurt, University of Göttingen, University of Münster, Saarland University, University of Tübingen, TU Dresden, the TUM School of Management and the Hochschule Niederrhein.

== Criticism ==
The Santander Consumer Bank AG is not a member of the Employers' organization of the private banking industry and thus not bound by collective agreements. At Santander, according to union information, there is a "proliferation of varying salaries" that has arisen in recent years as a result of acquisitions of banks. Almost one third of the employees work in a company-owned temporary employment agency and outsourced subsidiaries. According to Jörg Reinbrecht from the ver.di Financial Services Division, "even employees who only work on a commission basis have no fixed salary. They work in small branches that only sell loans, nothing else". The bank denies this.

The union ver.di has been negotiating with Santander since February 2012 on a company collective agreement. In particular, the employees taken over from SEB demanded the continuation of their collective agreement for all Santander employees. In April 2013, after 14 months of negotiations, an agreement was reached between Santander and ver.di. For the employees in the branches, a collective agreement came into force retroactively to April 1, 2013. There is still no collective agreement for employees in the head offices; the Santander Consumer Bank has committed to negotiations with ver.di for 2014.

In the spring of 2012 Santander withdrew from the free checking account and demanded from part of the customers account maintenance fees again. The information of the affected customers was packaged as a marketing campaign. In a judgment from November 2012 the district court Mönchengladbach saw in the procedure of the bank a misleading of the customers, a contract change requires the explicit agreement of the customer.

Consumer advocates also criticize inadmissible fees for loans. For example, Santander requires processing fees of up to 3.5 percent of the loan amount for installment loans. Meanwhile, there are several court judgments against Santander because of loan processing fees. Consumer advocates have organized a protection community for bank customers because of the large number of those affecteded, which has already filed lawsuits against banks in 150 cases to repay the fees.

Consumer advocates criticized in 2015 unjustified and inadmissibly high fees for address inquiries, reminders and ruptured direct debits.

== Awards (selection) ==
- At the "BankenMonitor 2017" of the magazine "Autohaus", the Santander Consumer Bank won first place with Mazda Finance in the "Brands without manufacturer bank" category.
- "markt intern": For the thirdteens time in a row, car dealers choose the Santander Consumer Bank as the "Best Autobank 2017"
- "Fair Company" Seal of approval of the job and business magazine "Karriere" of the publishing group Handelsblatt
- The "IHK Mittlerer Niederrhein" ranked the Santander Consumer Bank Mönchengladbach several times as one of the best IHK training companies in the region

== See also ==
- List of banks in Germany
