= KD-Bank =

German credit institute

Bank für Kirche und Diakonie
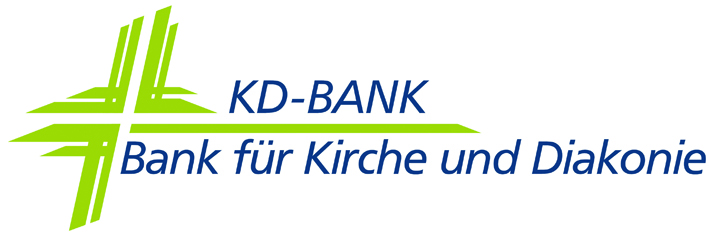

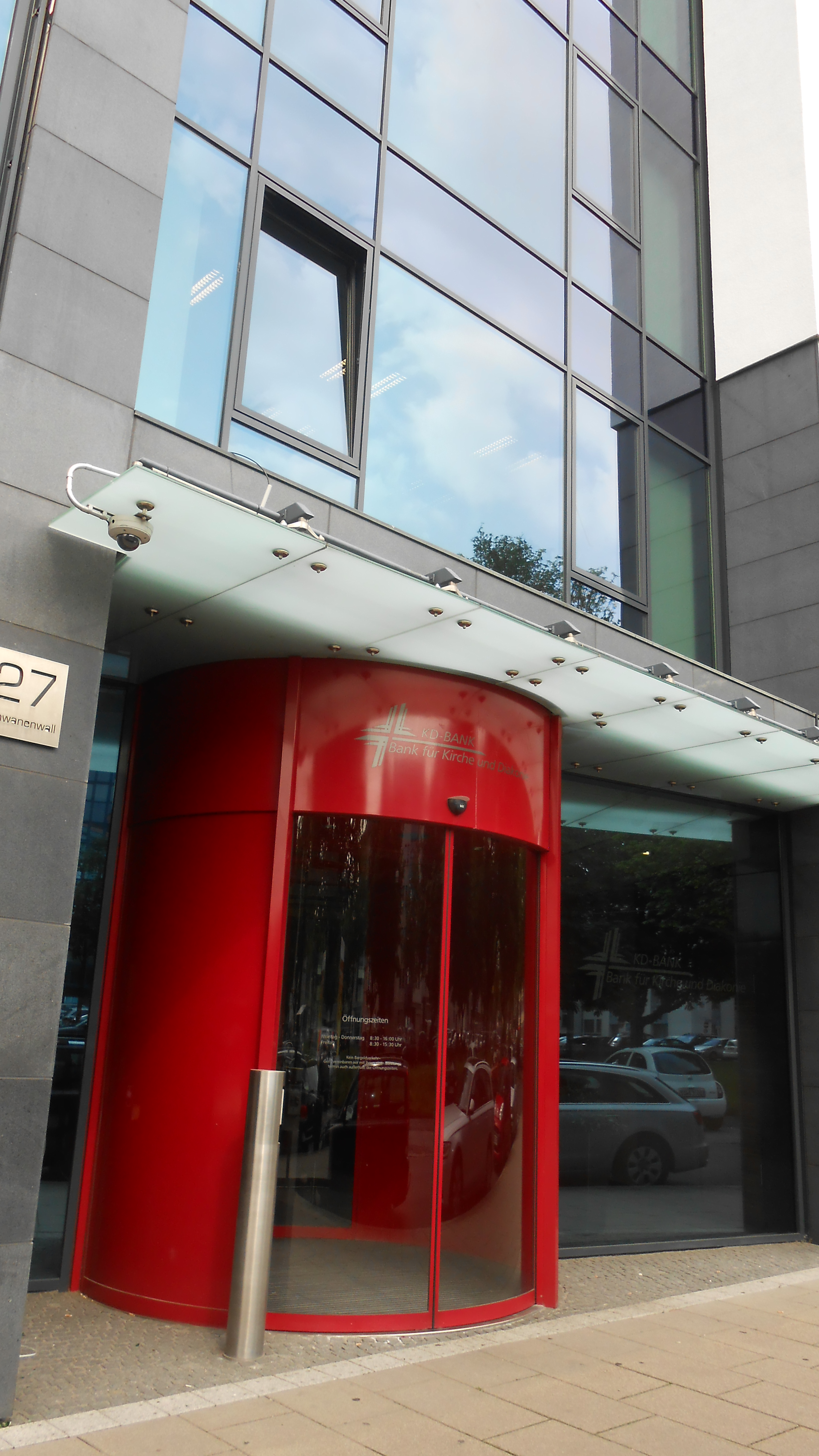
- Headquarter of KD-Bank in Dortmund
- Company type: Cooperative
- Industry: Bank
- Founded: 2003; 23 years ago
- Headquarters: Dortmund, Germany
- Products: Banking services
- Revenue: 5.641 Mio. Euro (2018)
- Number of employees: 220 (2018)
- Parent: Bundesverband der Deutschen Volksbanken und Raiffeisenbanken
- Website: www.kd-bank.de

The Bank für Kirche und Diakonie eG - KD-Bank (lit. 'bank for church and deaconry') is a German credit institute in Dortmund that provides services mostly to institutions and individuals from the area of the Protestant church in Germany and its deaconry. It operates and has a legal structure of a cooperative.

The KD-Bank specializes in providing financial services in the Christian finance sector. Its goal is not primarily profit maximization but the economic support of members and customers. The bank is a member in the German Bundesverband der Deutschen Volksbanken und Raiffeisenbanken (BVR).

As of 2018, KD-Bank employed 214 members of staff at the locations Dortmund (headquarter), Berlin, Dresden, Duisburg and Magdeburg. It specialises in services for donation based organizations, financing of charitable institutions, especially in the area of deaconry, and long term investments.

KD Bank has a capital of around seven billion euros and is one of the largest cooperative banks in Germany. Ekkehard Thiesler, president of the Management Board of KD Bank, said that since its foundation, the focus of the bank's activities has been for the purpose of "crediting projects of the Church and Diakonie". They have financed social housing, hospitals, kindergartens and schools along with environmental projects.

As of 2023, KD Bank achieved a net profit of 11.8 million euros and employs 250 people. The majority of ownership shares are held by members of church institutions, which yields a dividend of roughly four percent. KD Bank has around 28,000 private clients. The share of private clients in the bank's balance sheet is about ten percent.

== History ==
The Landeskirchliche Kredit-Genossenschaft Sachsen LKG (that would later become a branch of the KD-Bank in Dresden) was founded in 1925 as the first Protestant bank in Germany. In 1926, Victor Rohdich was appointed as administrative director of the Inner mission after being involved in the founding of the bank. A church bank was founded in the province of Saxony under the name of Provinzial Kirche Spar- und Darlehensgenossenschaft für die Provinz in Sachsen GmbH. In 1927, protestant loan cooperatives were initiated in Magdeburg and Münster. That same year, the capacity building institution Darlehensgenossenschaft der Westfälischen Inneren Mission eGmbH was founded by Martin Niemöller.

In 2003, the DGM and the BKD merged and became KD-Bank eG – die Bank für Kirche und Diakonie. Part of the fusion agreement was a new headquarters in the geographical middle of Duisburg and Münster. Since February 28, 2006, the building in Dortmund has served as the bank's headquarters.

On June 9, 2010, the general assembly of the KD-Bank voted for a merger with the Landeskirchlichen Kredit-Genossenschaft Sachsen eG (LKG) which is headquartered in Dresden. The merger became retroactive on January 1, 2010. Around the same time, the general assembly decided on renaming the bank Bank für Kirche und Diakonie eG – KD-BANK.

== Sustainability filter ==
As a Protestant church bank and one of only a few Christian based banks in Germany, the KD-Bank has supported a sustainability filter for financial investments in securities. The sustainability filter is guided by Christian ethics and uses three goals of the conciliar process: peace, justice and the preservation of creation.

== See also ==
- List of banks in Germany
