= Cash Group =

German interbank network

- Operating area: Germany
- Members: 15
- ATMs: >4,500
- Founded: 1998
- Website: Official website

Cash Group is a cooperation of the four largest German private banks (Deutsche Bank, Commerzbank, HypoVereinsbank, and Postbank) and their subsidiaries, in which they mutually waive ATM usage fees for their customers. It is not an interbank network but uses the pre-existing girocard network. With more than 4500 ATMs, the cooperating banks' ATM networks form the third largest ATM network in Germany.

The cooperation was founded in 1998 and is generally not open to other members. Its primary competitor in Germany is CashPool.

== Background ==
Most banks in Germany, while connected through the girocard network, charge ATM usage fees for customers of other banks.

Prior to 1998, the charge was fixed to 4,00 DM (2,05 €) or 1%, whichever was higher. However, this agreement was terminated by the Sparkassen (public banks), who jointly operate the largest German ATM network, arguing that the cost of operating ATMs was unfairly laid on them when virtual banks entered the market.

As a consequence, banks now had to deal with different ATM usage charges from other banks but were legally required to make definite quotes to their customers. Most of them simply charged their customers with the estimated maximum fee and pocketed the difference, which dramatically raised the ATM fees for banking customers.

Finally, in 1998, the five large German private banks formed Cash Group to counter the bad press resulting from the increase in ATM fees, waiving ATM usage fees within the Group and thus for customers of the Group's member banks.

After its formation, other German banks tried to become members of Cash Group but no other bank was accepted by the existing members, except new subsidiaries of the so-called big five. Therefore, in 2000, several smaller German banks founded CashPool as an answer to Cash Group. Today, CashPool is Cash Group's primary competitor in Germany. However, with more than 2,500 ATMs, and 29 member institutions it is significantly smaller. Norisbank GmbH, one of the current members of Cash Group, originally was a member of CashPool. It left CashPool and became a member of Cash Group after its acquisition by Deutsche Bank in 2006.

== Comparison with other groups ==
- The banks of the Sparkassen-Finanzgruppe operate 19,650 ATMs across Germany (as of 2023).
- The Bankcard service network of credit institutions belonging to the Federal Association of German Cooperative Banks has 13,791 ATMs nationwide (as of 2025).
- The credit institutions that are members of the Cashpool operate around 2,800 ATMs (as of 2024).

== Members ==
=== Four largest German private banks ===
- Deutsche Bank
- Commerzbank
- HypoVereinsbank
- Postbank (Note: Postbank is a branch of Deutsche Bank, serving as a brand of the retail arm since 2018.)

=== Subsidiaries ===
- Bankhaus Neelmeyer
- Bankhaus W. Fortmann & Söhne
- Berliner Bank
- comdirect bank
- DAB Bank
- Deutsche Bank Privat- und Geschäftskunden
- Norisbank
- Münsterländische Bank
- Oldenburgische Landesbankacc
- Deutsche Postbank
