= Steyler Bank =

Coordinates: 50.774312°N 7.181546°E

Steyler Bank GMBH

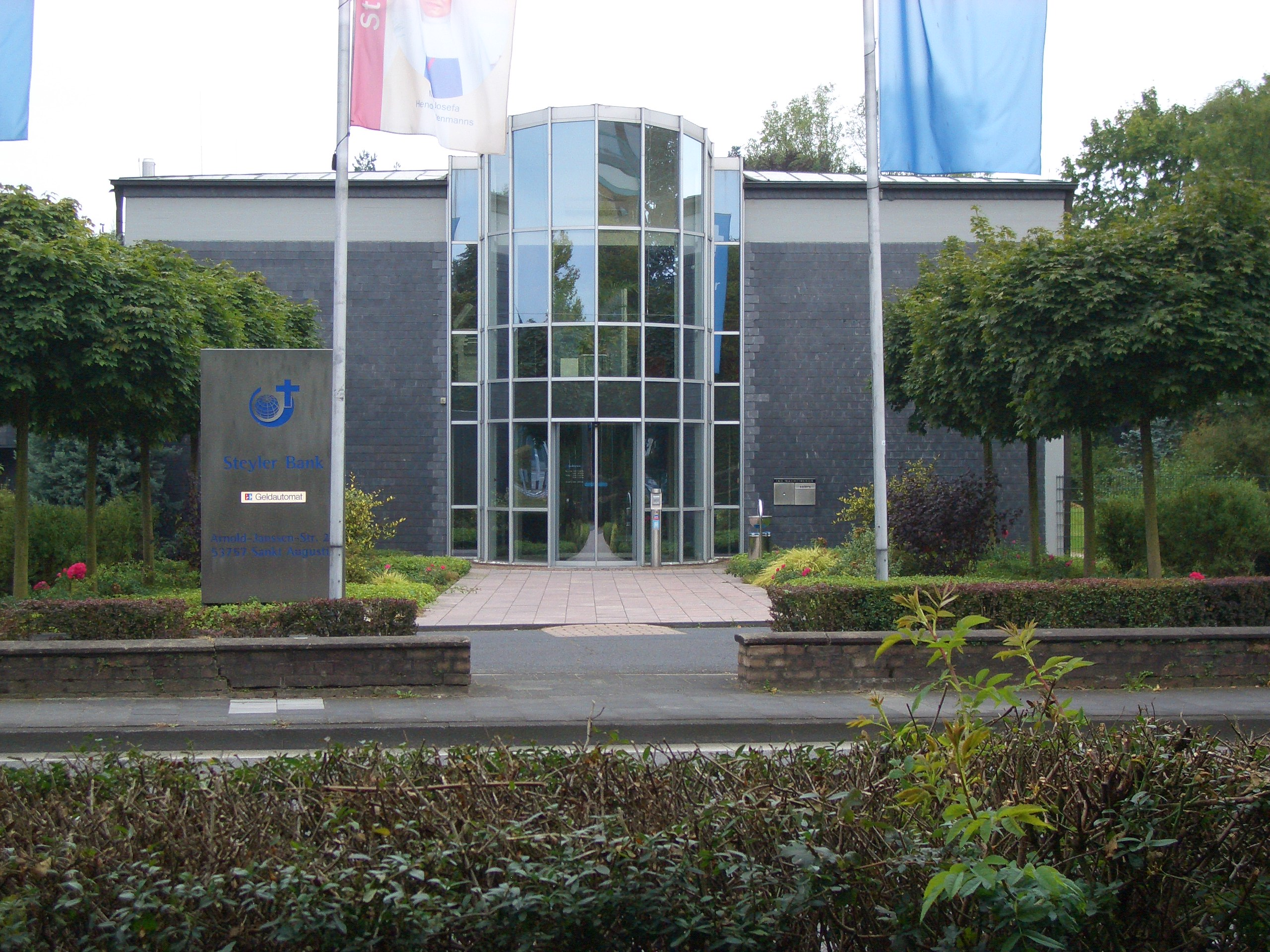
- Building of the Steyler Bank in Sankt Augustin
- Company type: Limited liability company
- Industry: Financial services
- Founded: 1964; 62 years ago
- Headquarters: Sankt Augustin, Germany
- Products: Investment funds, retail banking
- Total assets: €288,9 million (2017)
- Owner: Steyler Missionare
- Number of employees: 50 (2017)
- Website: www.steyler-bank.de

The Steyler Bank is a German ethical-ecological bank using Christian finance principles that following the Steyler Missionare. It was founded in 1964 in Sankt Augustin, where it still has its headquarters, and creates funds from an ethical point of view. The Steyler Bank also has a branch in Austria.

The Steyler Bank is a private bank in the legal form of a limited liability company and has share capital of around €2.5 million. The passive business is primarily operated for private and institutional clients. The focus is on investment advice and asset management. As bank of the Catholic Steyler Missionsorden, it is also committed to the missionary mission, justice, peace, and the integrity of creation. It also offers foundation advisory services and as of 2013 manages 197 trustee foundations.

== History ==
The bank was founded on 4 December 1963 under the name Steyler Missionssparinstitut Sankt Augustin GmbH. After being entered in the German Trade Register on February 13, 1964, the bank began operations. Previously, the Steyler Missionare had already been entrusted with funds whose interest income the missionaries could use for their work. This was no longer allowed by the Bankenaufsicht in 1964, so that the Steyler Missionare decided to found their own bank.

While the focus was still on the classic field of investment until the late 1990s, from 2000 the securities sector was added. In this context, the name was changed to Steyler Bank GmbH in 1999. In 2002, the branch in Austria was opened. On 1 June 2018, it was transferred from the Mission House St. Gabriel in Maria Enzersdorf to the city center of Vienna, because the previous rooms were needed by the Order for a different purpose.

== Fields of activity ==
=== Customers ===
Only about 25% of the approximately 16,000 customers come from the metropolitan area of Cologne/Bonn. The much larger number comes from the entire German federal territory with a focus on the southern German area. The Steyler Bank is also active internationally. Customers do not have to be Catholic, live in the area of the Archdiocese of Cologne or be employed by a church sponsor. This distinguishes the Steyler Bank from similar church banks of other religious denominations.

=== Interest ===
The Steyler Bank pays marketable and usual interest rates. The customer decides whether a certain percentage of his interest will be made available to the Steyler mission's projects.

=== Securities ===
The Steyler Bank has been raising two separate funds since 2012. These are a stock and a pension fund. (Sustainability Fund together with the bank M.M.Warburg & CO). However, the Steyler Bank's equity fund also contains investments in controversial companies, which the bank points to in a watchlist. With €2.5 million fund shares, the bank owns just under 18% of the €15 million equity fund itself. (As of June 30, 2013). Customers are also offered securities of other companies that meet defined social, cultural and environmental criteria.

=== Ethical investment ===
A key focus of the Steyler Bank is ethical, sustainable, or ESG investments. If the customer so wishes, they can use certain criteria to determine which exclusion criteria they wants to apply to their investments. Examples include: Child labour, the nuclear industry, defense companies, etc. The bank cooperates in this context with the Munich agency oekom-research. The applied criteria go back to the Frankfurt-Hohenheimer Leitfaden by Johannes Hofmann.

== Profit ==
The Steyler Bank managed client assets of €409.4 million in 2012 and generated a profit after tax of €0.32 million. Together with the customers' interest and capital donations, the bank was able to pass on €3.37 million to the Steyler mission, which supports numerous aid projects in 70 countries around the world.

== Deposit guarantee ==
The Steyler Bank is a member of the deposit insurance fund of the Bundesverband deutscher Banken.

== CashPool ==
The bank is a member of the interbank network CashPool. For example, customers can withdraw cash from their own account at no charge at more than 2,000 ATMs nationwide.

== Technologie ==
The Steyler Bank GmbH is affiliated with the cooperative data center of Atruvia AG in Münster and uses its software agree21 as its core banking system.

== See also ==
- List of banks in Germany
