= Keytrade Bank =

Financial services company based in Belgium

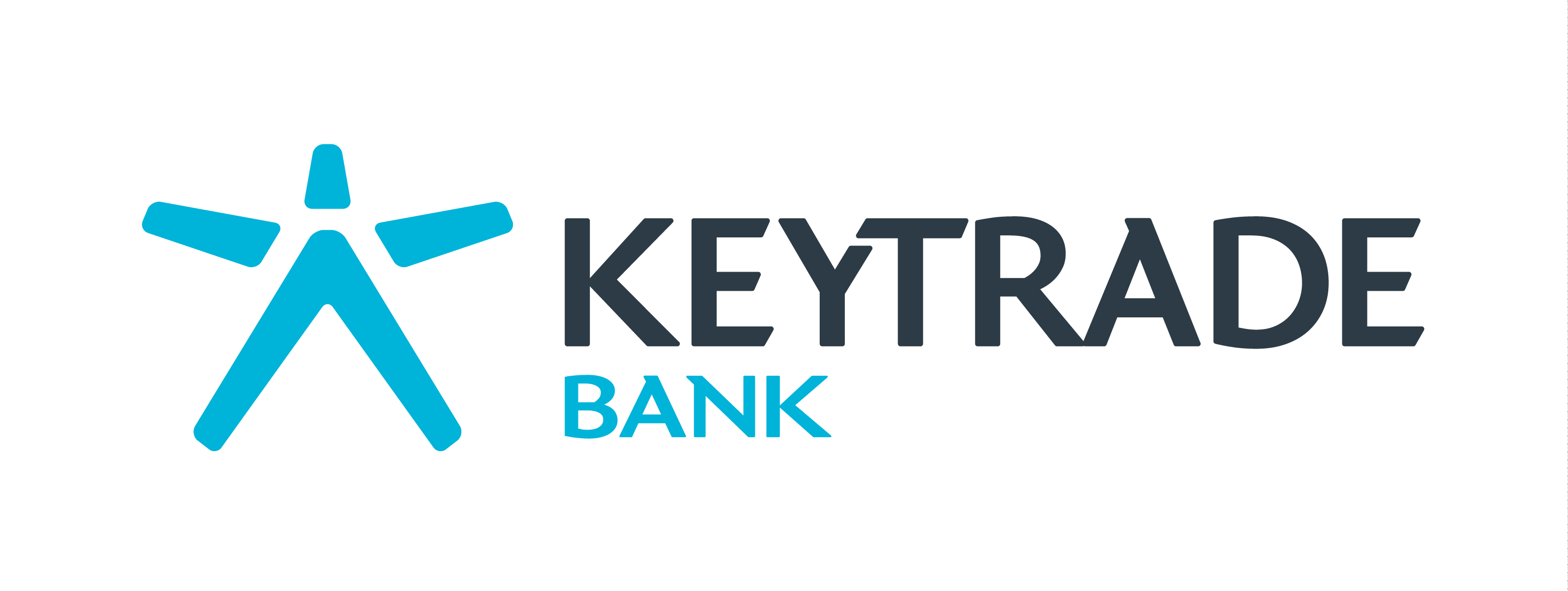
- Type: Subsidiary
- Industry: Financial services
- Predecessor: VMS-Keytrade
- Founded: Brussels, Belgium (September 15, 1998)
- Fate: Acquired by Crédit Mutuel Arkéa
- Headquarters: Brussels, Belgium
- Area served: Belgium
- Products: Finance and insurance
- Net income: ▲€15.63 million (2013); €8.958 million (2011); €18.979 million (2010)
- Total assets: ▲€78.20 million (2013); €86.458 million (2011); €83.338 million (2010)
- Number of employees: 130 (2013)
- Parent: Crédit Mutuel Arkéa
- Subsidiaries: Real Lease S.A/N.V Belgium, Keytrade Luxembourg S.A/N.V, Strateo
- Website: www.keytradebank.be

Keytrade Bank is a Belgium financial services company based in Brussels with a subsidiary in Luxembourg. The company provides banking services and is a brokerage firm providing trading in a number of financial instruments.

== History ==
VMS-Keytrade, Belgium's first online investment site, was found in 1998. In 2002, VMS-Keytrade became Keytrade Bank and acquired its banking status by taking over RealBank.

Between 2005 and 2016, Keytrade Bank was part of the Crelan Group, which until 2015 was 50% owned by the Crédit Agricole Group, one of Europe's largest groups (own funds of €64.8 billion and net profit of €6 billion).

Since June 2016, Keytrade Bank has been part of the Crédit Mutuel Arkéa banking group.

== Products ==
Keytrade Bank offers all banking and trading services online.

=== Banking ===
Keytrade Bank offers usual banking services with a current account, savings account, term account and also provides debit and credit cards.

- Current account: yielding 5 cents for each operation executed, includes Bancontact / Mister Cash / Maestro cards for free and VISA and American Express credit cards.
- Savings account: account with an interest rate of 0.05% a year + 0.20% fidelity premium.
- Term account: period of the term between 1 week and 1 year and with the possibility to break up the term or to extend the time.

=== Trading ===
As a brokerage firm, Keytrade Bank offers access to several markets: Euronext Brussels, Paris and London Stock Exchange, Frankfurt (Xetra), Milan (Borsa Italiana), Switzerland (SWX et Virt-x), Madrid (Bolsa de Madrid), Amsterdam, the U.S. (Nyse, Nasdaq, Amex et OTC-BB) and Canada (TSX & TSX Venture).

Keytrade Bank presents a broad range of products for private investors, including stocks, options, warrants, turbos, mutual funds, trackers, bonds, structured products.

Keytrade Bank also offers Keytrade Pro, a professional day-trading and trend trading platform for new products, which is used to be accessible only to professional investors. This platform allows the investor to invest in:

- The Forex (with 160 currency crosses)
- The Futures market with more than 400 available contracts in 15 markets
- CFDs which allow investors to take position on more than 3500 underlying stocks on the 22 largest global markets with a leverage effect from 1 to 10.

== Marketing ==
Keytrade Bank provides the numbers used in the daily financial magazine Cotes et Cours, which is broadcast by the RTBF. This partnership allows Keytrade Bank to run a short spot advertising just before and after the magazine.

On 29 September 2014, KeytradeBank Belgium introduced a new brand identity: a new logo, website and advertising campaign were announced.
