= Beobank =

Belgian bank

beObank nv/SA/AG

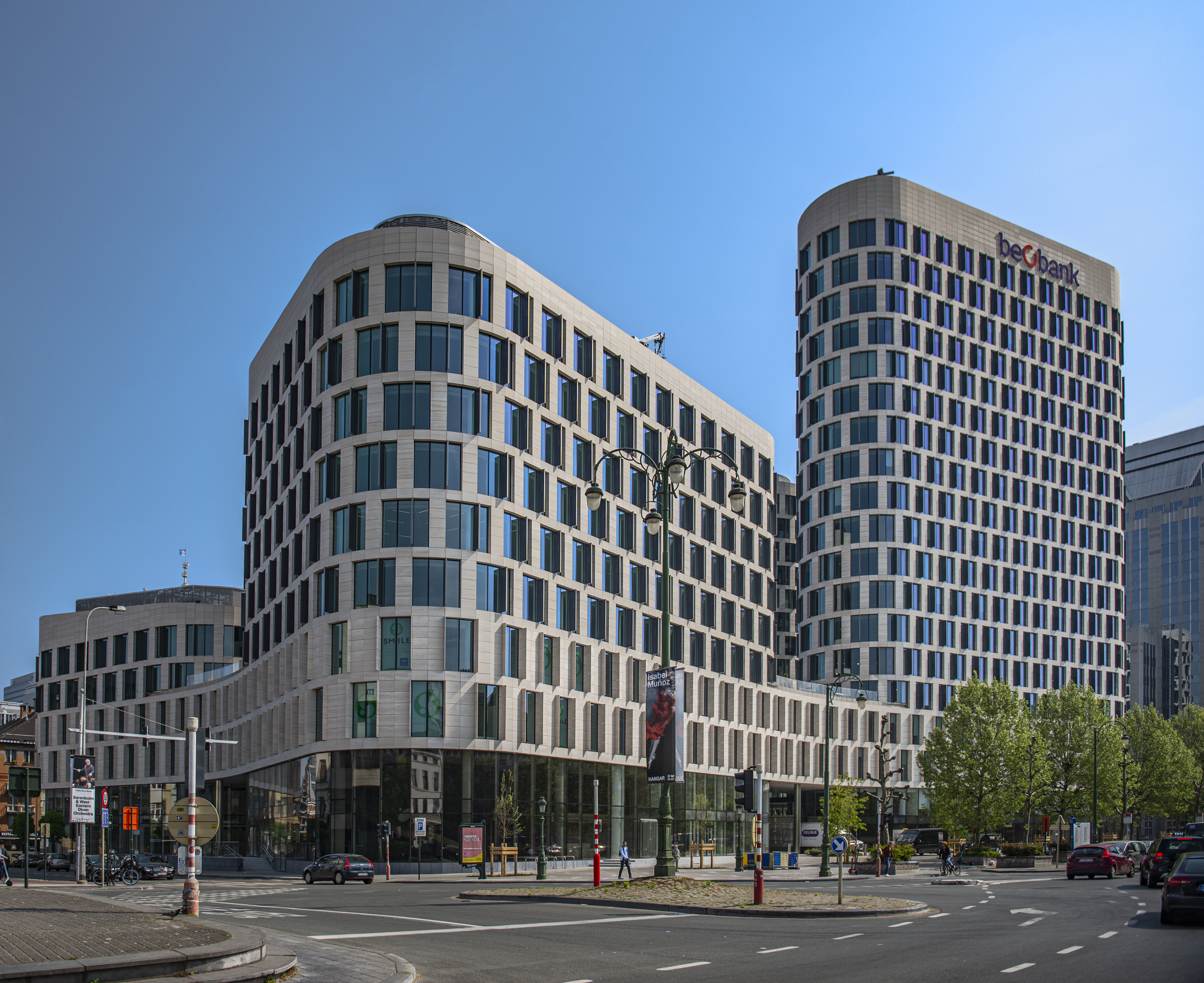
- Headquarters in Brussels, 2022
- Company type: Subsidiary
- Founded: 1919
- Parent: Crédit Mutuel Nord Europe

beObank, nv/SA/AG is a Belgian bank owned by French bank Crédit Mutuel Alliance Fédérale.

As of 2013, the company offers everyday banking products (current accounts, loans, credit cards, etc.) through the network of 192 branches across Belgium.

== History ==
City Bank of New York was opened in Brussels in 1919 and continued its operations until World War II. In 1962, Citibank reopened its banking facilities in Brussels. In 1969, Citibank took over Crédivit Bank and Financia Bank. Crédivit merged with Financia to form Famibank in 1977. After having taken over Banque Copine and Banque Sud Belge, Banque Sud Belge merged with Famibank, creating Citibank Belgium in 1992. In 2012 the Citibank consumer franchise was sold to Crédit mutuel Nord Europe. In March 2013, Citibank Belgium was rebranded to Beobank NV/SA. In May 2015, the Crédit mutuel Nord Europe group's BKCP bank disappeared in favor of the Beobank brand.

== See also ==
- List of banks in Belgium
