= Raiffeisen =

Raiffeisen usually refers to Friedrich Wilhelm Raiffeisen (1818–1888) and the cooperative endeavors he inspired in several European countries:

- Deutscher Genossenschafts- und Raiffeisenverband in Germany;
- Raiffeisenbank, disambiguation page for Raiffeisen-inspired financial service providers in multiple countries.
