= Degussa Bank =

German universal bank

Coordinates: 50.1146°N 8.640578°E

- Company type: Aktiengesellschaft
- Industry: Universal bank
- Founded: 1873
- Headquarters: Frankfurt, Germany
- Total assets: € 6,106 million (2018)
- Number of employees: 687 (2018)
- Parent: OLB (2024–present)
- Website: www.degussa-bank.de

The Degussa Bank AG, based in Frankfurt, was a German universal bank. With a balance sheet total of €6.106 million in 2018, it has more than 250 branches in Germany, mainly in industrial, business and technology parks as well as at corporate locations.

On April 30, 2024, it was announced that Oldenburgische Landesbank (OLB) had completed the acquisition of the Frankfurt-based financial institution.

== Business areas ==
The bank operates in two business areas: retail banking and corporate banking. In the private customer business, the bank focuses specifically on the employees of the partner companies at corporate locations.

In the corporate customer business, the bank specializes in a range of financial services for the management of partner companies. These include, among other things, services in the corporate credit card business as well as services in the employee stock ownership business.

As a partner to the companies close to where the Degussa Bank maintains branches, the bank develops services for these companies, for example in the field of travel management.

The bank is admitted to trading on the stock exchanges in Frankfurt am Main, Berlin, Munich and Stuttgart.

== History ==
In 1873 Degussa (Deutsche Gold- und Silber-Scheide-Anstalt) was founded. Even then, Degussa was entitled to "engage in banking activities related to the trading and processing of coins and unmounted precious metals". In 1936 it was recognized as a foreign exchange bank. In 1947 the house was approved as a foreign trade bank. In 1979, the Degussa Bank headquartered in Frankfurt am Main was spun out of Degussa AG as GmbH. The department in the group thus became a bank.

From 2002 until the end of 2006, the institute, as a subsidiary of ING-DiBa AG, belonged to the Dutch ING Group.

The Degussa Bank AG is the parent company of the Degussa Bank-Group and, for its part, is not majority-dominated. ERSTE NEUE Christian Olearius Beteiligungsgesellschaft mbH and Degussa Poolgesellschaft mbH & Co. KG, both based in Hamburg, hold more than 25% of the bank.

In 2014, the bank changed its legal form from a limited liability company to a Corporation.

On April 30, 2024, the company was acquired by Oldenburgische Landesbank (OLB).

== Further information ==
The bank is a member of the deposit insurance fund of the Federal Bundesverband deutscher Banken.
