= Volksbank =

Volksbank means "people's bank" in Afrikaans, Dutch and German. It generally refers to a form of cooperative banking. Specifically, Volksbank may refer to:

- Volksbank Group in Austria
- Volksbank van Leuven, a now-disappeared bank at the root of KBC Group in Belgium
- banks named Volksbank within the German Cooperative Financial Group
- de Volksbank in the Netherlands
- Schweizerische Volksbank in Switzerland, acquired in 1993 by Credit Suisse

== See also ==
- Volkskas in South Africa
- People's Bank (disambiguation)
- Raiffeisenbank, another kind of cooperative bank in the German-speaking world
