= Crédit Mutuel =

French cooperative bank

Coordinates: 48.6005°N 7.7566°E

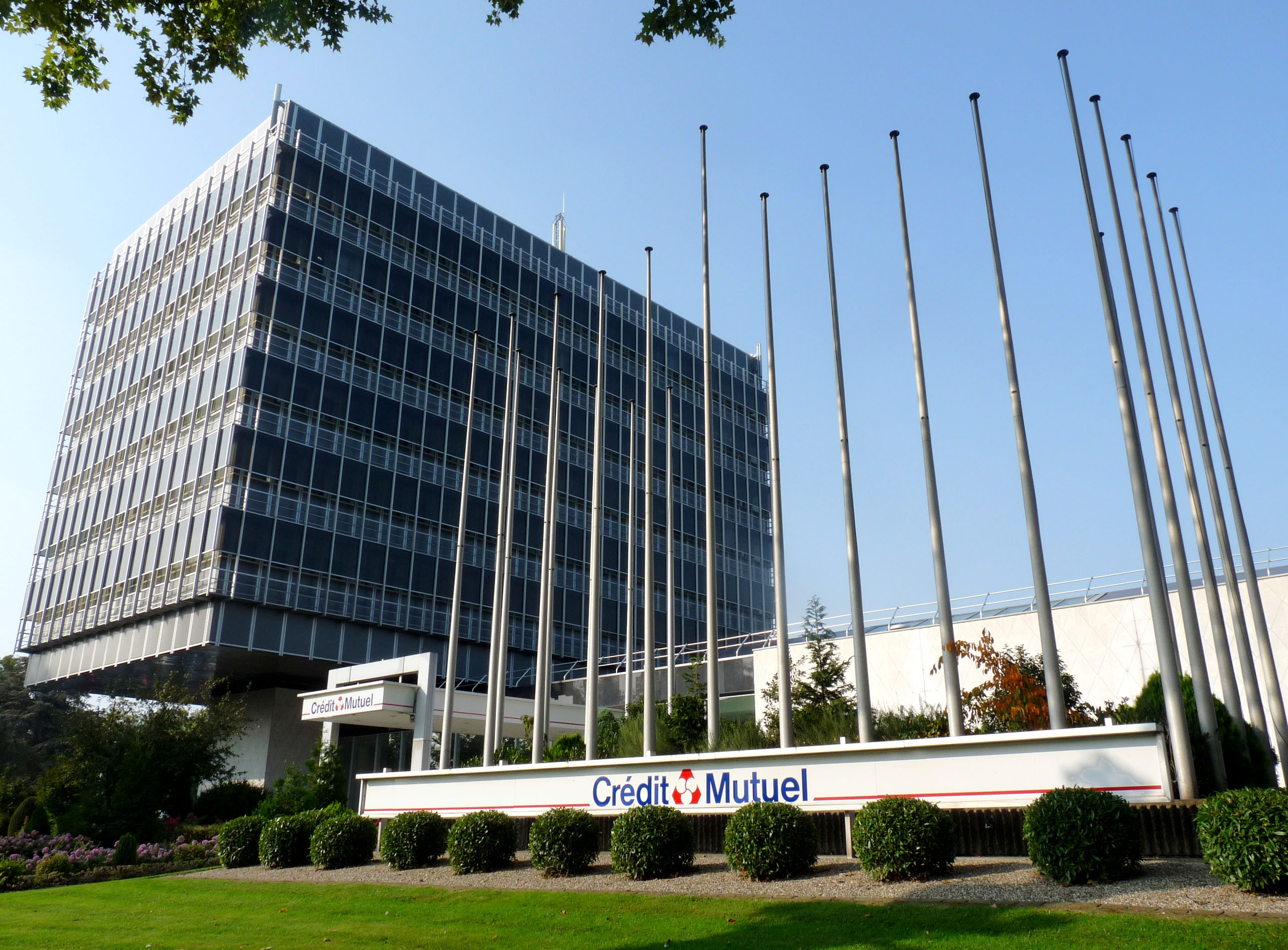
- Headquarters of Crédit Mutuel Alliance Fédérale in the Wacken neighborhood of Strasbourg, France
- Type: Credit union
- Industry: Financial services
- Predecessor: 27 February 1882; 144 years ago first bank based on the Raiffeisen model
- Founded: 10 September 1947; 79 years ago first cooperative bank of Crédit Mutuel
- Headquarters: Paris, France
- Key people: Nicolas Théry, President of the National Confederation and of Crédit Mutuel Alliance Fédérale; Julien Carmona, president of Crédit Mutuel Arkéa
- Products: Retail banking; corporate banking; investment banking; insurance; private banking; private equity; mortgage loans; credit cards; investment management; wealth management; asset management; mutual funds; exchange-traded funds; index funds
- Revenue: ▲€20.4 billion (2022)
- Operating income: ▼€7 billion (2022)
- Net income: ▼€4.1 billion (2022)
- Total assets: ▲€1.194 trillion (Q4 2025)
- Total equity: ▲€68.6 billion (2022)
- Number of employees: ▲83,636 (2022)
- Website: creditmutuel.com

Crédit Mutuel (French pronunciation: [kʁedi mytɥɛl]; lit. 'Mutual Credit') is a French cooperative banking group, one of the country's top five banks with over 30 million customers. It traces its origins back to the German cooperative movement inspired by Friedrich Wilhelm Raiffeisen in Alsace–Lorraine under German rule, in the 1880s. Crédit Mutuel was a member of the International Raiffeisen Union (IRU).

Crédit Mutuel has been designated as a Significant Institution since the entry into force of European Banking Supervision in late 2014, and as a consequence is directly supervised by the European Central Bank.

== History ==
=== Origins ===
The first local cooperative bank inspired by the Raiffeisen system on what is now French territory was created in February 1882 in La Wantzenau, a village near Strasbourg. The network in German-ruled Alsace–Lorraine grew quickly to 127 local banks in 1892, and 471 in 1914. Louis Durand (1859-1916), a lawyer in Lyon, was inspired by the Raiffeisen model and started a similar network from 1893, grouped under the Union des caisses rurales et ouvrières de France (UCROF).

Following France's recovery of Alsace-Lorraine after World War I, some of the local banks joined the Crédit Agricole network, while others preferred to maintain their Raiffeisen identity and adopted the Crédit Mutuel name. The Banque Fédérative du Crédit Mutuel (BFCM) in Strasbourg was established in 1919 as a financial entity for the reorganized network. Prior to the law of September 10, 1947, local banks were recognized as non-profit entities. Following the enactment of this legislation, they were reclassified as cooperatives. In 1958, new legislation remodeled the group's governance and established the Confédération Nationale du Crédit Mutuel as its central organization in Paris.

=== After the 2008 financial crisis: expansion with acquisitions ===
In 2008, during the 2008 financial crisis, Crédit Mutuel bought Citibank's retail bank activities in Germany for 5.2 billion euros. Citibank Germany had over 3 million clients and 7% of the market share in Germany. Citibank sold multiple retail units across Europe and the world to reduce risk and focus on core activities like corporate and investment banking. The German network was subsequently rebranded Targobank.

In 2011, Crédit Mutuel bought Citibank's Belgian branch (Citibank Belgium) and renamed it as Beobank in 2013. In 2016, Crédit Mutuel Arkéa bought Belgian online bank Keytrade Bank.

In 2020, Crédit Mutuel announced it had signed an agreement allowing its customers to use the Apple Pay service.

In March 2025, Crédit Mutuel acquired the German bank Oldenburgische Landesbank through its German subsidiary Targobank.

== Organization ==
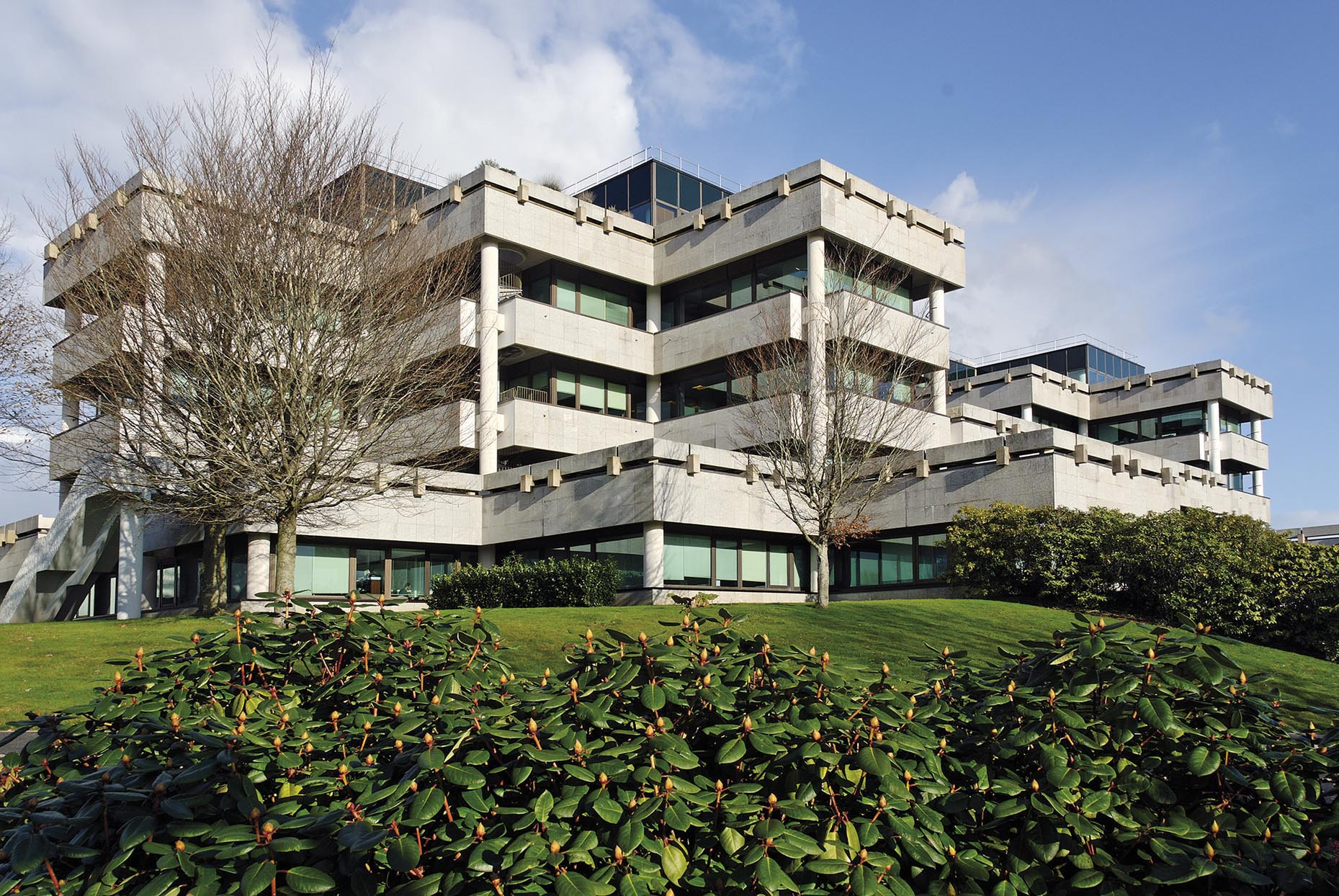
Head office of Crédit Mutuel Arkéa near Brest

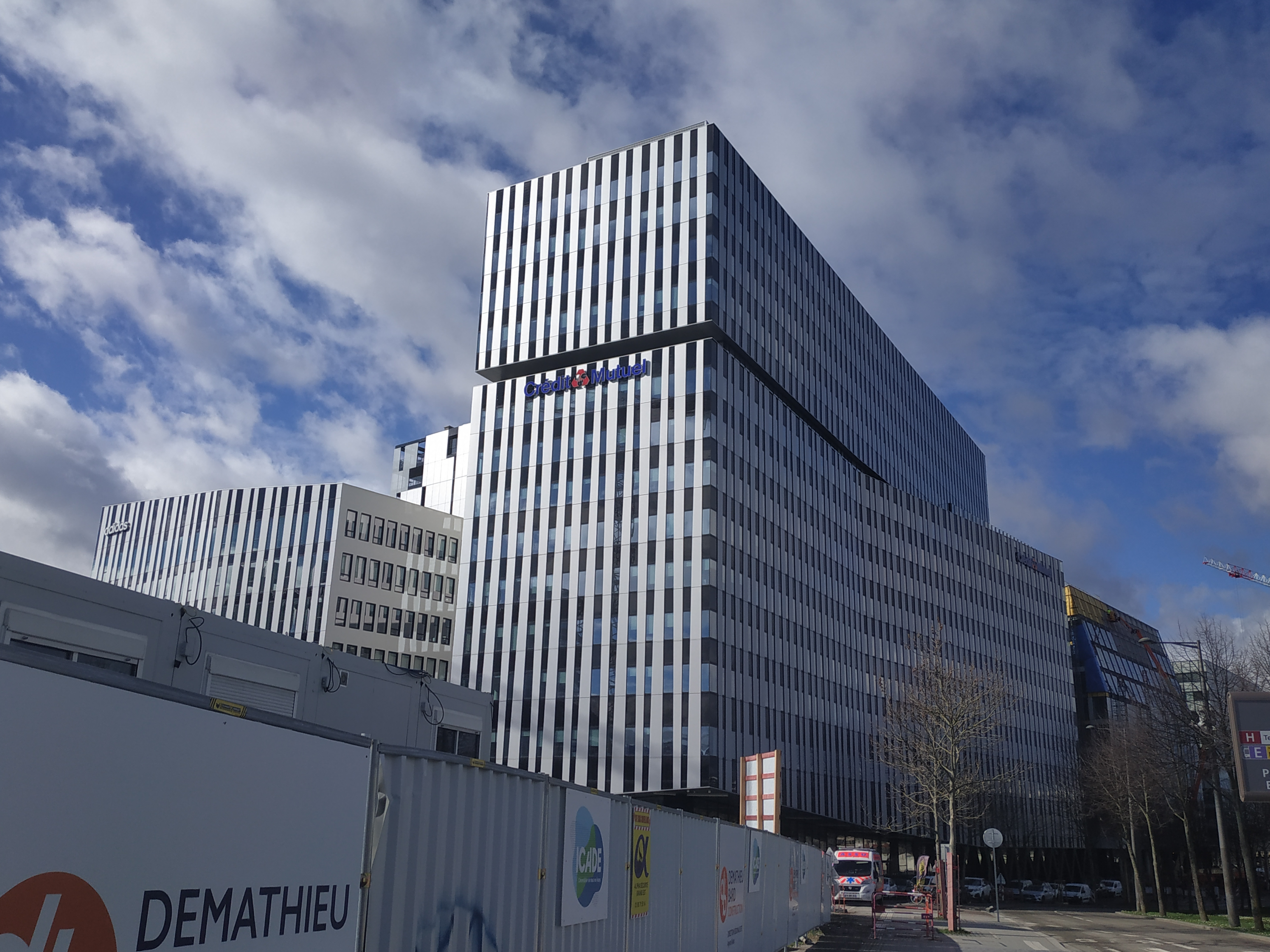
New extension of the Crédit Mutuel Alliance Fédérale complex in Strasbourg

The Crédit Mutuel group has a decentralized structure, despite being designated as a single significant institution under European Banking Supervision. Its central entity is the Confédération Nationale du Crédit Mutuel (CNCM) in Paris. The CNCM was headquartered from 1981 to 2020 at 88–90, rue Cardinet in Paris, and in 2020 moved to a newly erected building at 46, Rue du Bastion near the high-rise Tribunal judiciaire de Paris.

In France, the group's main retail network is formed of around 2,000 individual local Crédit Mutuel banks (French: caisses), which are owned by their customers in line with the Raiffeisen system. These local cooperative banks are grouped into 18 regional federations and one nationwide agricultural federation.

=== Crédit Mutuel Alliance Fédérale ===
In 1992, the Fédération du Crédit Mutuel de Centre Est Europe (CMCEE) was formed in Strasbourg, where the Crédit Mutuel was born in German-ruled Alsace–Lorraine, through the merger of the regional federations of Alsace, Lorraine, Franche-Comté and Centre-Est, the latter including Bourgogne and Champagne-Ardennes. Since 2011, a number of regional federations have formed a quasi-national grouping led by the CMCEE, initially called the "CM11" and known since 2018 as the Crédit Mutuel Alliance Fédérale, which as of early 2022 brings together 14 of the 18 regional federations plus the nationwide agricultural federation. The local banks of the Alliance fédérale collectively own the Caisse fédérale de Crédit Mutuel in Strasbourg, which in turns owns 91.7% of the Banque fédérative du Crédit Mutuel (BFCM), with an additional 6.4% of the latter being held by regional federations through their regional caisses. The Caisse fédérale also owns the Caisse agricole du Crédit Mutuel, which serves the nationwide agricultural federation except in Brittany.

The BFCM in turns owns most of the group's assets beyond the network of local cooperative banks, both in France and abroad. As of early 2022, these included Crédit Industriel et Commercial, a significant banking group which is older than Crédit Mutuel itself, purchased in stages between 1998 and 2017; subsidiaries that host consumer credit (Cofidis), real estate, asset management, insurance, private equity, factoring and leasing; Groupe EBRA, a fully owned media group active in Eastern France; and 96% of the Banque européenne du Crédit Mutuel (BECM), a specialized bank that provides property lending in France and Germany. Other affiliates outside of France include:

- Banque de Luxembourg in Luxembourg
- Targobank in Germany
- 51% of Beobank in Belgium, with the remaining 49% held by regional federations of Crédit Mutuel in France
- a 35% stake in Banque de Tunisie in Tunisia
- a 25% stake in Bank of Africa in Morocco

=== Crédit Mutuel Arkéa and other federations ===
The federations outside of the Alliance fédérale are those of Brittany (headquartered at Le Relecq-Kerhuon near Brest) and Sud-Ouest (in Bordeaux), which together form a grouping called Crédit mutuel Arkéa with its own brand identity; Maine-Anjou-Basse-Normandie (MABN, in Laval); and Océan (in La Roche-sur-Yon). Each of the Arkéa, MABN and Océan groupings have their own serving banking entity, respectively the Caisse interfédérale Crédit Mutuel Arkéa, Caisse Fédérale du Crédit Mutuel de Maine-Anjou et Basse-Normandie, and Caisse Fédérale du Crédit Mutuel Océan. Arkéa also has specialized financial services subsidiaries mirroring those of the BFCM, as well as an online bank, Fortuneo, which it acquired in 2006, and the Belgian Keytrade Bank, acquired in 2016.

=== Caisse Centrale du Crédit Mutuel ===
The Caisse Centrale du Crédit Mutuel, run by the CNCM in Paris and not to be confused with the Caisse Fédérale in Strasbourg, is a bank that serves financial functions for the entire group, including the Alliance fédérale and Arkéa. Its capital structure is a reflection of the Crédit Mutuel group's structure. As of end-2021, its shareholders were the Caisse Fédérale de Crédit Mutuel (54.07%); Crédit Mutuel Arkéa (20.15%); the Caisse Fédérale du Crédit Mutuel Nord Europe (13.11%); the Caisse Fédérale du Crédit Mutuel de Maine-Anjou et Basse-Normandie (7.26%); and the Caisse Fédérale du Crédit Mutuel Océan (5.41%). the regional federation of Crédit Mutuel Nord Europe, based in Lille, joined the Alliance fédérale with effect on 1 January 2022, so that its stake may be expected to be consolidated with that of the Caisse Fédérale.

== Motto ==
Crédit Mutuel's corporate motto is "La banque qui appartient à ses clients, ça change tout!" ("The bank owned by its customers, that changes everything!")

== Controversy ==
=== Check processing fees ===
In 2010 the French government's Autorité de la concurrence (the department in charge of regulating competition) fined eleven banks, including Crédit Mutuel, the sum of €384,900,000 for colluding to charge unjustified fees on check processing, especially for extra fees charged during the transition from paper check transfer to "Exchanges Check-Image" electronic transfer.

=== CIC and the National Bank of Haiti ===
Crédit Mutuel's subsidiary the Crédit Industriel et Commercial (CIC), known for having helped finance the construction of the Eiffel Tower, played a controversial role in extracting income from Haiti and transferring the wealth into France at around the same time. According to a 2022 New York Times investigation into France's colonial legacy in Haiti, the bank benefited loan and concession arrangements with the Haitian Government that required the latter to transfer to CIC and its partners nearly half of all taxes the government collected on exports. By "effectively choking off the nation’s primary source of income," the CIC "left a crippling legacy of financial extraction and dashed hopes — even by the standards of a nation with a long history of both."

== See also ==
- List of investors in Bernard L. Madoff Investment Securities
- List of banks in France
- List of banks in the euro area
- List of European cooperative banks
