= Raiffeisenbank =

Raiffeisenbank or Raiffeisen Bank refers to cooperative banks in Europe that are rooted in the early credit unions of Friedrich Wilhelm Raiffeisen. The name is found in:

Raiffeisen Switzerland

- Raiffeisen Banking Group, Austrian group of cooperative banks
  - Raiffeisen Bank International (RBI), the group's central institution
    - Raiffeisen Zentralbank, the group's former central institution until merger into RBI in 2017
    - Group subsidiaries in central and eastern Europe:
      - Raiffeisen (Albania)
      - Raiffeisenbank (Czech Republic)
      - Raiffeisen Bank (Hungary)
      - Raiffeisen Bank (Kosovo)
      - Raiffeisen Bank (Romania)
      - Raiffeisenbank (Russia)
      - Raiffeisen Bank (Serbia)
      - Raiffeisen Bank (Ukraine)
  - Raiffeisenlandesbank Niederösterreich-Wien
  - Raiffeisenlandesbank Oberösterreich
  - Raiffeisen-Landesbank Tirol
- German Cooperative Financial Group, which includes Volksbanken and Raiffeisenbanken
- Raiffeisen Landesbank Südtirol – Cassa Centrale Raiffeisen dell'Alto Adige, South Tyrol, Italy group of cooperative banks
- Raiffeisen (Switzerland), Swiss group of cooperative banks
- Banque Raiffeisen, Luxembourgish group of cooperative banks
- Rabobank (originally "Raiffeisen-Boerenleenbank"), Dutch group of cooperative banks
- Raiffeisen Privatbank Liechtenstein AG

== See also ==
- KBC Bank
- Crédit Mutuel
- Raiffeisen (disambiguation)
- Volksbank
