= Norisbank =

German bank

Coordinates: 50.719991°N 7.110643°E

Norisbank GmbH
- Type: Limited liability company (GmbH)
- Industry: Bank
- Founded: 1954
- Headquarters: Bonn, Germany
- Total assets: €3,861,0 million (2018)
- Number of employees: 51 (2018)
- Parent: Deutsche Bank
- Website: www.norisbank.de

The Norisbank is a German bank with headquarters in Bonn. Since 2 November 2006, it has been a subsidiary of Deutsche Bank and since 27 July 2012 purely a direct bank.

== History ==
Former logo 2007

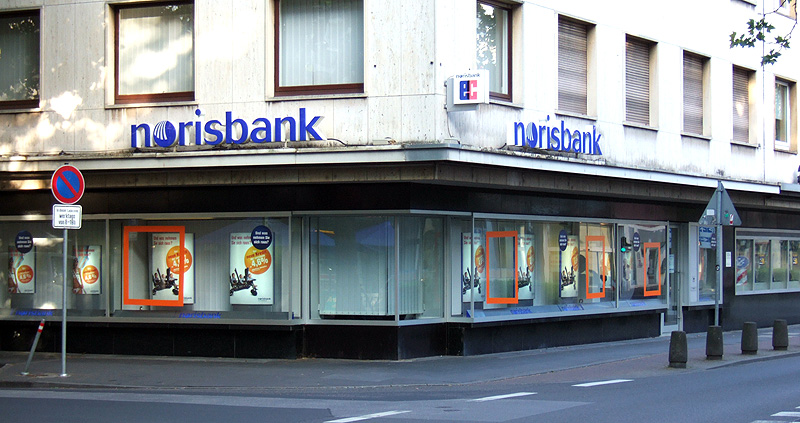
Former Norisbank subsidiary in Mainz in 2006

The roots of Norisbank date back to the year 1954. Starting that year, the mail-order company Quelle offered to finance its products via Noris purchase aid.

On 4 June 1965, Noris Kreditbank GmbH was founded in Nuremberg. The business objective was to expand the financing of the entire supply of Quelle and its subsidiaries in the mail order and in the stationery sector. In the year 1969 Noris purchase aid changed its name to Noris Bank GmbH. The name change was accompanied by an expansion of the product range to include banking services such as checking and savings accounts.

In 1984, Norisbank GmbH merged with Hamburg Verbraucherbank GmbH. The reason for the takeover of the previously independent Verbraucherbank GmbH was the acquisition of the first German customer self-service system. Verbraucherbank had introduced the customer self-service in 1975 as the first financial institution in Germany, 1977 one of the first ATMs worldwide followed as well as the first online banking offer in Germany in 1980. The Noris Verbraucherbank GmbH was part of Quelle Group until the end of 1997 and was sold to Bayerische Vereinsbank on 19 June 1997. It merged Noris Verbraucherbank GmbH with Franken WKV Bank GmbH (founded in 1950).

In January 1999, Hypo Service Bank (HSB), founded in 1991, was integrated into Norisbank AG. In 2000, Norisbank AG was the first bank on the Internet to offer loans with an online instant pledge.

After uncertainties in 2002, when HypoVereinsbank was considering integrating Norisbank into its own branch network, it was decided in December 2002 to sell Norisbank. On 1 October 2003, DZ Bank became the new owner of Norisbank AG for a purchase price of EUR 180 million.

On August 3, 2006, DZ Bank sold the 98 branches and the brand name Norisbank for 420 million Euros to Deutsche Bank, which also took over the customer base. Norisbank AG based in Nuremberg then renamed to Teambank AG Nuremberg, while the sold branches were continued by the newly founded Norisbank GmbH based in Frankfurt am Main.

== Corporate Development ==
In July 2005, Norisbank AG entered a new business field: the sale of its consumer credit easy credit, which was completely detached from other banking services, via installment credit stores in city centers, shopping malls and arterial roads in the city. Over the years, this market strategy has attracted 500,000 new customers. However, not all credit customers could be won as regular customers. In August 2006, the bank had around 650,000 customers.

In the course of the sale to Deutsche Bank some services were limited: Thus, the number of self-service terminals in the branches was reduced, there were no online foreign transfers possible and the cash counter no longer accepted coins. On January 1, 2008, the classic counter traffic was completely ended. Since then, the branches have only been advisory offices with self-service zones.

By the sale of Norisbank to Deutsche Bank Group Norisbank resigned from the ATM network CashPool on October 31, 2006, and returned to Cash Group. Because of its former affiliation with Hypovereinsbank, Norisbank was already a member of Cash Group until 2003.

The new business model saw itself as a direct bank with branches. In the 90 branches, customers were able to receive advice on issues such as investments and pension plans. Despite the advice in the branch, branch customers received the same conditions as through direct sales.

On 1 October 2008, the headquarter was moved to Berlin. As part of the restructuring, all branches were closed on 27 July 2012 and Norisbank converted into a direct bank. Since then, banking transactions have been conducted by customers primarily via the Internet, via telephone banking and via the self-service terminals in Deutsche Bank's branches. The 400 former branch employees were transferred without any layoffs to Postbank, also a subsidiary of Deutsche Bank. Today, Norisbank employs around fifty people (mainly in management), and a large part of its banking services are provided by other employees within Deutsche Bank Group. Since December 2014, Bonn is the seat of Norisbank.

== See also ==
- List of banks in Germany
