= BBBank =

German cooperative bank

- Type: Cooperative
- Industry: Cooperative banking
- Founded: 12 November 1921
- Headquarters: Karlsruhe, Germany
- Revenue: 11.761 Mio. Euro (2018)
- Members: 484.779 (2018)
- Number of employees: 1,491 (2018)
- Parent: Baden-Württembergischer Genossenschaftsverband
- Website: www.bbbank.de

The BBBank eG (formerly Badische Beamtenbank) is a German cooperative bank headquartered in Karlsruhe (Baden-Württemberg). With total assets of almost 11 billion Euros and over 470,000 members the bank is one of the biggest member banks in Germany.

== Profile ==
The bank stands in the tradition of the Deutsche Beamtenbanken (German civil servant banks). For customers of the public sector there are specialists in the branches and the Direkt Bank. Since the end of the 1960s private persons of all professions can become members.

With over 130 branches the BBBank is the only cooperative retail bank that serves a nationwide business area. In areas where there is no local branch the bank can be accessed online via its Direkt Bank.

The business model of the BBBank is a low risk model that aims for sustainability. As a cooperative Institute no shareholder interests need to be taken into account. The bank can concentrate on the needs of customers who according to the statutes are also members and co-owners of the bank.

The BBBank is a member of CashPool and the Bankcard-Servicenetz (bank card service network).

== History ==
=== 1921-1969 ===
On 12 November 1921 the BBBank was founded as a self-help facility for the public service in Karlsruhe. The Badische Beamten-Genossenschaftsbank eGmbH (Baden cooperative bank for civil servants), as the BBBank was called in those days, began operation on 1 January 1922 with 33 founding members in a small room in the House Nowackanlage 19. Already two years later the building on Waldstraße 1 was purchased, which to this day is part of the head office of the BBBank.

The Badische Beamtenbank emerged from the nationwide crisis in the 1920s: Almost out of nothing the postal inspector Gotthold Mayer together with a small group of colleagues formed a cooperative bank. The trigger was one of Gotthold Mayers colleagues who wanted to build a house but whose loan was not approved by his bank, which in those days was not unusual. Back then civil servants were not believed to be credit-worthy.

Gotthold Mayers ideas aimed toward giving civil servants the opportunity to invest the part of their salary they did not use instantly into safe and interest-bearing investments. All payment transactions were to be free of charge for all members. The innovation was to finance loans for civil servants through investments made by civil servants. Through this process a whole profession became credible which up to that point had only little opportunity to access loans. In addition, profits were to benefit the membership.

With the Nazi seizure of control in January 1933 the civil servants bank had to accept losses in the course of the Gleichschaltung (enforced conformity). The cooperative idea of self-help was majorly cut back and twisted for the new regimes purposes. In April 1933 Gotthold Mayer had to step down from his chairman position. However, in the beginning of 1946 he was able to take back the leadership of the Badischen Beamtenbank and navigate the Institute through the difficult post-war years and the currency reform. Only in 1967 the bank founder retired at the age of 80. At this point the bank had 136,000 members as well as 14 branches and was the biggest credit cooperative in Europe. Gotthold Mayer remained honorary chairman of the bank until his death on 7 February 1970.

=== 1969–2005 ===
In 1969 the circle of members was opened. Now not only civil servants but also employees of other professions were able to become members of the BBBank

In 1981, in the year of the banks 60th anniversary, the Badische Beamtenbank had more than 200,000 members.

In 1990 total assets of the bank reached the 5-billion-Deutsche Mark. In 1992 the bank opened a branch in Dresden and in 1994 in Berlin, where another two branches opened in the course of 1997. In 1997 the bank was member wise the biggest cooperative bank in Europe with total assets of almost 9 billion DM.

In 1999 the rebranding from Badische Beamtenbank to today’s BBBank happened.

From 1972 until 2005 five independent cooperative banks came under the Badische Beamtenbanks umbrella: the Hessische Beamtenbank (Darmstadt), the Südwestdeutsche Beamtenbank (Frankfurt am Main), the Beamtenbank zu Köln, the Bayerische Beamten Bank and last the Schleswig-Holsteinische Beamtenbank. Since then the BBBank is the only civil servants bank in Germany. In 2002, Wolfgang Müller was appointed CEO of The BBBank and he played a pivotal role in modernising the bank's operations and expanding its services.

=== BBBank today ===
BBBank operates a network of more than 100 branches across all 16 states, alongside direct banking and online banking services and a smartphone and tablet app. The bank focuses on retail banking and offers the products and services of a universal bank.

In 2011 the bank was awarded the certificate audit berufundfamilie (audit career and family) for the first time by the charitable Hertie-Stiftung (Hertie Foundation). The audit looked at existing and planned offers of the BBBank for compatibility of family and career in the context of a family-conscious human resource policy. The bank currently offers part-time positions and flexible working hours. The quota in this area is at almost 25%. However, this does not always involve young mothers and fathers. Some members of staff take up the banks offer to look after care-dependent relatives. Since then the certificate has regularly been confirmed, lastly 2017.

== Fire and burglary damage fund ==
The hedge of the private household against fire, burglary and vandalism damage was already considered such an important matter in the founding days of the bank, that an insurance was founded for customers and members of the BBBank, the Feuer -und Einbruchschadenkasse VVaG (fire and burglary damage fund). The insurance is based on the principle of solidarity as usual for mutual insurance. The sum of all member entry fees is used to compensate damage related costs until all funds are used up. Only then an apportionment is raised for the assured, which usually happens every four years. In this way members enjoy a non-contributory period of four years and full coverage at the same time.

== See also ==
- List of banks in the euro area
- List of banks in Germany
