= Oldenburgische Landesbank =

German banking company

Oldenburgische Landesbank AG
- Type: Public
- Industry: Financial services
- Predecessor: Oldenburgische Spar- und Leihbank
- Founded: 15 January 1869
- Headquarters: Oldenburg, Germany
- Number of locations: 80
- Key people: Christophe Jéhan, CEO
- Operating income: €758.0m (FY 2025)
- Total assets: €33.9bn (FY 2025)
- Number of employees: 1,724 (FY 2025)
- Parent: TARGO Deutschland GmbH
- Website: olb.de -->

Logo until August 2019

Logo until November 2024

Oldenburgische Landesbank AG (OLB) is a private financial institution from north-west Germany that serves its customers under the two renowned brands OLB Bank and Bankhaus Neelmeyer throughout Germany and in selected neighbouring European countries. Its headquarters are in Oldenburg. Since January 2026, OLB has been part of TARGO Deutschland GmbH, the German holding company of the major French bank Credit Mutuel Alliance Fédérale.

== History ==
OLB was founded in 1869 by the Frankfurt-based bank Erlanger & Söhne with the privilege of issuing banknotes. Their first director was Lorenz Zuckermandel. Today, the universal bank is partner for its clients in two strategic business segments: Private & Business Customers including high-net-worth customers in the field of Wealth Management, and Corporates & Diversified Lending including for instance Corporate Finance, Commercial Real Estate, Acquisition Finance and Football Finance.

OLB maintains a wide network of locations, which focuses on the northwestern part of Germany, known as Weser-Ems (comprising Osnabrück Land, Emsland, County of Bentheim, East Frisia, Ammerland, Friesland, Oldenburg (Oldenburg), and Oldenburg Münsterland), as well as Bremen (since 1 July 2009). Its first branch in North Rhine-Westphalia opened 7 November 2011 in Rheine, yet has been closed again in the meantime.

Currently, OLB operates 40 branches in north-west Germany, including 16 competence centres serving as anchor points for personal customer relationship management and regional advisory services, plus about 40 worksite-branches throughout Germany following the merger of Degussa Bank. In addition, the Bank operates a few dozen self-service branches in Germany. The bank bundled its advisory services at larger locations, which led to smaller branches being closed or converted to self-service branches, while at the same time OLB is also continuing to expand its business across Germany via digital channels, platforms and partners.

On 23 June 2017, Bremer Kreditbank AG acquired a majority stake in OLB from Allianz. The parent company Bremer Kreditbank was merged with OLB in 2018. In addition, Wüstenrot Bank was acquired by Wüstenrot & Württembergische in 2018. This was followed by the signing of an agreement to purchase Degussa Bank in September 2022. With the official closing on April 30, 2024, OLB became the new owner of Degussa Bank and merged Degussa Bank into OLB at the end of August 2024.

OLB’s shares were largely held in recent years by shareholders associated with Teacher Retirement System of Texas, the private equity firm Apollo. and Grovepoint Investment Management.

On 20 March 2025, the Bank announced that the shareholders of OLB - instead of a possible IPO - have reached an agreement to sell the entire share capital of OLB to TARGO Deutschland GmbH, subsidiary of Crédit Mutuel Alliance Fédérale group. On 2 January 2026, Crédit Mutuel announced the completion of the acquisition of OLB, through Targo Deutschland GmbH.

== Board of Managing Directors ==
- Christophe Jéhan (CEO)
- Michael Fust (CFO)
- Annett Daldrup (CRO)
- Chris Eggert (CIO)
- Dr Andreas Houben (CSO)

== Chairwomann of the Supervisory Board ==
- Isabelllle Chevelard

== See also ==
- List of banks in the euro area
- List of banks in Germany
