= SozialBank =

German financial institution

Coordinates: 50.951575°N 6.96728°E

SozialBank AG
- Industry: Specialized commercial bank for companies, institutions and organizations from the areas of health, social services and education
- Founded: 1923
- Headquarters: Cologne, Germany
- Total assets: 8.652,5 Mio. Euro (2017)
- Number of employees: 464 (2017)
- Parent: BFS SozialFinanz AG
- Website: www.sozialbank.de

The SozialBank AG is a specialized commercial bank for companies, institutions and organizations from the areas of health, social services (support for the elderly and disabled people, child and youth services) and education which is located in Cologne, Germany.

SozialBank is owned by the holding company "BFS SozialFinanz AG".

== Ownership ==
The bank was founded in March 1923 at the urging of the Reichsarbeitsministeriums (federal ministry of labor) as financial institute of the Freie Wohlfahrtspflege (free social welfare services) and operated in the beginning under the name Hilfskasse gemeinnütziger Wohlfahrtseinrichtungen Deutschlands G.m.b.H. In 1929 it became the Berufsgenossenschaft für Gesundheitsdienst und Wohlfahrtspflege. Still today shareholders of the bank are umbrella organizations of the free social welfare and its foundations.

Stockholders are the Deutscher Caritasverband and the foundation Kronenkreuz (Diakonisches Werk) with each 25.5%, Arbeiterwohlfahrt (labor welfare association) with 7.9%, Paritätischer Wohlfahrtsverband (parity welfare association) with 3.6%, German Red Cross with 2.4% and Zentralwohlfahrtsstelle der Juden (Jewish welfare association) with 0.7%. The rest is free float.

== Business mission ==
The SozialBank offers all services and products of a universal bank. However, it is a specialized commercial bank in regards to its limited range of customers. The consulting is focused on the traditional business and includes not only banking specific aspects but also financing terms and conditions of health and social management. Those are especially shaped by social insurances and social legislation. In addition, the bank offers branch specific products such as social economic mezzanine fonds, online-factoring and services for donation-based organizations.

Services like production site and competitor analysis for care homes, feasibility studies, collateral value assessments and valuation reports, a wide-ranging seminar program as well as publications and presentations on the latest legal and economic issues in the health and social management sector are also on offer at SozialBank.

SozialBank operates in 16 locations in Germany (Berlin, Dresden, Erfurt, Essen, Hamburg, Hanover, Karlsruhe, Kassel, Cologne, Leipzig, Magdeburg, Mainz, Munich, Nuremberg, Rostock, Stuttgart) and runs a European office in Brussels.

== BFS Service GmbH ==
BFS Service GmbH was founded in 1989 as a subsidiary of the Bank for Social Economy. It is based in Cologne's Rheinauhafen. The purchase of receivables (factoring) is the main business area of BFS Service GmbH. Customers include outpatient nursing services, rescue services, patient transport, hospitals and rehabilitation clinics that pre-finance their services through BFS Service GmbH. In addition, the company has specialized in the areas of consulting and analysis as well as the preparation of reports (mortgage value reports, traffic and market value reports) for the health and social economy.

== Key figures ==
Index	2019	2018	2017	2016	2015	2014	2013	2012
Total assets (in million Euro)	8.683,7	8.835,8	8.652,5	8.693,6	9.360,5	9.314,8	8.669,6	7.314,7
Average number of staff (Full- and part-time employee)	481	482	413	407	374	354	339	

== Antisemitism accusation ==
The Simon Wiesenthal Center listed the bank in its annual list of the ten worst global antisemitism incidents (after 1945) in 2018. The reason was an account that it held which led to the European Jews for a Just Peace (EJJP). According to various sources, this group of Jews and Israelis is linked to Boycott, Divestment and Sanctions. The account was terminated, which in turn also attracted protests. Because of this event, the bank commissioned Juliane Wetzel, a staff member of the Berlin Center for Research on Antisemitism, to examine whether or not the "Jewish Voice", a German EJJP member organization, was antisemitic. This also sparked protests: Iris Hefets, of the executive committee of the "Jewish Voice", revolted in January 2019 that her organization, consisting exclusively of Jews, on behalf of a German bank should be found as "guilty or acquitted of anti-Semitism by a German expert". In a press statement, the bank decisively rejected the reproach of the antisemitism. It has no business relationship with the BDS campaign, nor does it support its objectives: "Boycotting aimed at destabilizing the state of Israel is incompatible with our corporate policies. The BDS campaign would never get an account with us."

== See also ==
- List of banks in Germany
