= Sparda-Bank =

German cooperative banks collective

- Company type: Cooperative banks collective
- Industry: Financial services
- Founded: 6 May 1896; 130 years ago
- Headquarters: Frankfurt am Main, Germany
- Products: Giro, retail banking
- Website: www.sparda.de

The Sparda-Banks are eleven German cooperative banks which are consolidated in the Verband der Sparda-Banken e. V. (Union of Sparda-Banks). Traditionally they are specialized in the retail banking business. The eleven, legally independent banks operate according to the regional principle, which means that each bank is responsible for a set business area and accepts customers only from that area.

== History ==
The oldest Sparda-Bank was founded on 6 May 1896 as Spar- und Vorschuss-Verein der badischen Eisenbahnbeamten (Savings and Imprest Association of the Baden Railroad Officials) in Karlsruhe. Based on this model, equal cooperatives were founded in other places, which, in the spring of 1906, consolidated in the Revisionsverband der Eisenbahn-Spar- und Darlehnskassen (Revision Federation of the Railroad Savings and Loan Associations) in Kassel.

In 1969 the railroad savings banks were opened for staff of other public services and in 1974 for all employees (steady income in the salary account is expected). Since 1978 the banks uniformly call themselves Sparda-Banks.

In the center of its business activities is the standardized retail banking. Customers purchase at least one cooperative share (the amount and the maximum of available shares is determined individually by each bank in a statute) and are therefore, together with other customers, members and part owners of the bank. For the cooperative shares an annual dividend is paid (at the Sparda-Bank Süd-West currently 3%, at the Sparda-Bank Baden-Württemberg 3.5%).

== Products ==
The Sparda-Banks checking account (excluding Sparda-Bank Berlin since October 1, 2017) is free of charge for members as wage, salary or retirement account. However, since 2015, Sparda-Banks charge annually different amounts for the Bankcard.

== Cooperative ==
The following Sparda-Banks are consolidated in the Verband der Sparda-Banken e. V. (Union of Sparda-Banks) which as auditing association is responsible for the statutory audits according to the cooperative bill:

- Sparda-Bank Augsburg
- Sparda-Bank Baden-Württemberg (in Stuttgart, fusion with Sparda-Bank Karlsruhe)
- Sparda-Bank Berlin
- Sparda-Bank Hamburg
- Sparda-Bank Hannover
- Sparda-Bank Hessen
- Sparda-Bank Munich
- Sparda-Bank Nürnberg
- Sparda-Bank Ost Bayern (in Regensburg)
- Sparda-Bank Südwest
- Sparda-Bank West (fusion of Sparda-Banks in Essen, Wuppertal and Cologne)

Sparda-Banks are members in the National Association of German Cooperative Banks (BVR) and its protection scheme. Sparda-Banks are together with other banks part of CashPool. A few Sparda-Banks have agreements for a free of charge cash withdrawal at Postbank ATMs.

== Business figures ==
In sum the total assets of all Sparda-Banks was 68.9 billion euros in 2016. At the end of 2016 the number of all members of Sparda-Banks was 3.6 million.
