= List of co-operative banks in Germany =

This is a list of co-operative banks in Germany according to the information provided by the Bundesverband der Deutschen Volksbanken und Raiffeisenbanken (BVR) umbrella organisation.

By late 2008, there were 1,197 co-operative banks in Germany with total assets of €668 billion.

German co-operative banks are members of regional organisations. These organisations are responsible for additional support of the local bank (such as specialised salesforces or providing further education for the bank staff) as well as acting as an audit body in compliance with German banking law.

== Regional organisations ==
Abbreviation	Organisation	Location
BWGV	Baden-Württembergischer Genossenschaftsverband	Karlsruhe
GVB	Genossenschaftsverband Bayern	München
GV	Genossenschaftsverband	Neu-Isenburg
GVWE	Genossenschaftsverband Weser-Ems	Oldenburg
RWGV	Rheinisch-Westfälischer Genossenschaftsverband	Münster

== Volksbanks and Raiffeisenbanks ==
Name	Location	Federal state	Organisation	Branches	Routing code
VR-Bank Aalen eG	Aalen	Baden-Württemberg	BWGV	25	614 901 50
Abtsgmünder Bank -Raiffeisen- eG	Abtsgmünd	Baden-Württemberg	BWGV	4	600 696 73
Volksbank Achern eG	Achern	Baden-Württemberg	BWGV	18	662 913 00
Raiffeisenbank Aidlingen eG	Aidlingen	Baden-Württemberg	BWGV	4	600 692 06
Onstmettinger Bank eG	Albstadt	Baden-Württemberg	BWGV	1	653 619 89
Volksbank Ebingen eG	Albstadt	Baden-Württemberg	BWGV	23	653 901 20
Volksbank Tailfingen eG	Albstadt	Baden-Württemberg	BWGV	6	653 920 30
Raiffeisenbank Vordersteinenberg eG	Alfdorf	Baden-Württemberg	BWGV	2	600 694 55
Raiffeisenbank Weissacher Tal eG	Allmersbach im Tal	Baden-Württemberg	BWGV	3	602 618 18
Volksbank Altshausen eG	Altshausen	Baden-Württemberg	BWGV	8	650 922 00
Volksbank Ammerbuch eG	Ammerbuch	Baden-Württemberg	BWGV	6	641 613 97
Raiffeisenbank Vorallgäu eG	Amtzell	Baden-Württemberg	BWGV	5	650 627 93
Raiffeisenbank Aulendorf eG	Aulendorf	Baden-Württemberg	BWGV	1	650 612 19
Volksbank Backnang eG	Backnang	Baden-Württemberg	BWGV	22	602 911 20
Federseebank eG	Bad Buchau	Baden-Württemberg	BWGV	6	600 698 60
Volksbank Bad Mergentheim eG	Bad Mergentheim	Baden-Württemberg	BWGV	6	623 910 10
Volksbank Rhein-Wehra eG	Bad Säckingen	Baden-Württemberg	BWGV	14	684 900 00
Raiffeisenbank Bad Saulgau eG	Bad Saulgau	Baden-Württemberg	BWGV	5	650 630 86
Volksbank Bad Saulgau eG	Bad Saulgau	Baden-Württemberg	BWGV	21	650 930 20
Raiffeisenbank Bad Schussenried eG	Bad Schussenried	Baden-Württemberg	BWGV	4	600 693 03
Raiffeisenbank Reute-Gaisbeuren eG	Bad Waldsee	Baden-Württemberg	BWGV	2	600 693 50
Bad Waldseer Bank eG	Bad Waldsee	Baden-Württemberg	BWGV	8	650 913 00
Volksbank Murgtal eG	Baiersbronn	Baden-Württemberg	BWGV	3	600 695 05
Volksbank Baiersbronn eG	Baiersbronn	Baden-Württemberg	BWGV	4	642 613 63
Volksbank Balingen eG	Balingen	Baden-Württemberg	BWGV	16	653 912 10
Volksbank Beilstein-Ilsfeld-Abstatt eG	Beilstein	Baden-Württemberg	BWGV	7	620 622 15
Raiffeisenbank Berghülen eG	Berghülen	Baden-Württemberg	BWGV	1	600 699 31
Raiffeisenbank Birkenfeld eG	Birkenfeld	Baden-Württemberg	BWGV	6	606 613 69
Volksbank Blaubeuren eG	Blaubeuren	Baden-Württemberg	BWGV	8	630 912 00
Raiffeisenbank Gammesfeld eG	Blaufelden	Baden-Württemberg	BWGV	1	600 697 10
VR-Bank Stromberg-Neckar eG	Bönnigheim	Baden-Württemberg	BWGV	16	604 914 30
Bopfinger Bank Sechta-Ries eG	Bopfingen	Baden-Württemberg	BWGV	8	600 692 39
Volksbank Brackenheim-Güglingen eG	Brackenheim	Baden-Württemberg	BWGV	17	620 914 00
Volksbank Breisgau-Süd eG	Breisach	Baden-Württemberg	BWGV	20	680 615 05
Raiffeisenbank Bretzfeld-Neuenstein eG	Bretzfeld	Baden-Württemberg	BWGV	7	600 696 80
Volksbank Bruchsal-Bretten eG	Bruchsal	Baden-Württemberg	BWGV	35	663 912 00
Volksbank Franken eG	Buchen	Baden-Württemberg	BWGV	24	674 614 24
Raiffeisenbank Altschweier eG	Bühl	Baden-Württemberg	BWGV	1	662 614 16
Volksbank Bühl eG	Bühl	Baden-Württemberg	BWGV	22	662 914 00
Spar- und Kreditbank Bühlertal eG	Bühlertal	Baden-Württemberg	BWGV	2	662 610 92
Raiffeisenbank Oberes Bühlertal eG	Bühlertann	Baden-Württemberg	BWGV	2	600 692 45
Crailsheimer Volksbank eG	Crailsheim	Baden-Württemberg	BWGV	19	622 910 20
Creglinger Bank eG	Creglingen	Baden-Württemberg	BWGV	11	623 612 74
Spar- und Kreditbank Dauchingen eG	Dauchingen	Baden-Württemberg	BWGV	1	660 691 04
Volksbank-Raiffeisenbank Deggingen eG	Deggingen	Baden-Württemberg	BWGV	6	610 912 00
Volksbank Deisslingen eG	Deißlingen	Baden-Württemberg	BWGV	3	642 914 20
Raiffeisenbank Denzlingen-Sexau eG	Denzlingen	Baden-Württemberg	BWGV	1	680 621 05
Volksbank Dettenhausen eG	Dettenhausen	Baden-Württemberg	BWGV	1	600 693 78
Raiffeisenbank Hardt-Bruhrain eG	Dettenheim	Baden-Württemberg	BWGV	7	660 623 66
Dettinger Bank eG	Dettingen an der Erms	Baden-Württemberg	BWGV	1	600 693 87
Volksbank Dornstetten eG	Dornstetten	Baden-Württemberg	BWGV	12	642 624 08
Raiffeisenbank Südhardt eG	Durmersheim	Baden-Württemberg	BWGV	6	665 620 53
Volksbank Neckartal eG	Eberbach	Baden-Württemberg	BWGV	31	672 917 00
Raiffeisenbank Oberessendorf eG	Eberhardzell	Baden-Württemberg	BWGV	1	600 694 31
SKB Hardt eG	Eggenstein-Leopoldshafen	Baden-Württemberg	BWGV	5	660 621 38
Raiffeisenbank Ehingen-Hochsträß eG	Ehingen	Baden-Württemberg	BWGV	19	600 693 46
Ehinger Volksbank eG	Ehingen	Baden-Württemberg	BWGV	30	630 910 10
Ehninger Bank eG	Ehningen	Baden-Württemberg	BWGV	1	600 693 55
VR-Bank Ellwangen eG	Ellwangen	Baden-Württemberg	BWGV	12	614 910 10
Raiffeisenbank Elztal eG	Elztal	Baden-Württemberg	BWGV	1	660 691 03
Volksbank Breisgau Nord eG	Emmendingen	Baden-Württemberg	BWGV	36	680 920 00
Raiffeisenbank Dellmensingen eG	Erbach	Baden-Württemberg	BWGV	2	600 690 17
Raiffeisenbank Donau-Iller eG	Erbach	Baden-Württemberg	BWGV	15	600 692 51
Raiffeisenbank Erlenbach eG	Erlenbach	Baden-Württemberg	BWGV	1	600 699 11
Raiffeisenbank Erlenmoos eG	Erlenmoos	Baden-Württemberg	BWGV	1	600 693 02
Raiffeisenbank Illertal eG	Erolzheim	Baden-Württemberg	BWGV	10	654 622 31
Berkheimer Bank eG	Esslingen	Baden-Württemberg	BWGV	1	600 699 27
Volksbank Esslingen eG	Esslingen	Baden-Württemberg	BWGV	18	611 901 10
Volksbank Ettlingen eG	Ettlingen	Baden-Württemberg	BWGV	23	660 912 00
Fellbacher Bank eG	Fellbach	Baden-Württemberg	BWGV	6	602 613 29
Bernhauser Bank eG	Filderstadt	Baden-Württemberg	BWGV	2	612 623 45
Volksbank Flein-Talheim eG	Flein	Baden-Württemberg	BWGV	3	620 626 43
Volksbank Freiberg und Umgebung eG	Freiberg	Baden-Württemberg	BWGV	9	600 697 38
Volksbank Freiburg eG	Freiburg	Baden-Württemberg	BWGV	41	680 900 00
Volksbank Horb-Freudenstadt eG	Freudenstadt	Baden-Württemberg	BWGV	16	642 910 10
Volksbank Hohenneuffen eG	Frickenhausen	Baden-Württemberg	BWGV	10	612 613 39
Volksbank Friedrichshafen eG	Friedrichshafen	Baden-Württemberg	BWGV	11	651 901 10
Raiffeisenbank Geislingen-Rosenfeld eG	Geislingen	Baden-Württemberg	BWGV	5	653 624 99
Raiffeisenbank Heidenheimer Alb eG	Gerstetten	Baden-Württemberg	BWGV	5	600 694 76
Volksbank Brenztal eG	Giengen	Baden-Württemberg	BWGV	4	600 695 27
Volksbank Glatten-Wittendorf eG	Glatten	Baden-Württemberg	BWGV	3	600 699 26
VR Bank Steinlach-Wiesaz-Härten eG	Gomaringen	Baden-Württemberg	BWGV	9	640 618 54
Raiffeisenbank Maitis eG	Göppingen	Baden-Württemberg	BWGV	1	600 693 36
Volksbank Göppingen eG	Göppingen	Baden-Württemberg	BWGV	40	610 605 00
Raiffeisenbank Gruibingen eG	Gruibingen	Baden-Württemberg	BWGV	1	600 692 42
Raiffeisenbank Gundelfingen eG	Gundelfingen	Baden-Württemberg	BWGV	7	680 642 22
Hagnauer Volksbank eG	Hagnau	Baden-Württemberg	BWGV	2	690 912 00
Raiffeisenbank Aichhalden-Hardt-Sulgen eG	Hardt	Baden-Württemberg	BWGV	3	600 695 53
Volksbank Hohenzollern eG	Hechingen	Baden-Württemberg	BWGV	29	641 632 25
Heidelberger Volksbank eG	Heidelberg	Baden-Württemberg	BWGV	15	672 900 00
H + G BANK Heidelberg Kurpfalz eG	Heidelberg	Baden-Württemberg	BWGV	18	672 901 00
Heidenheimer Volksbank eG	Heidenheim	Baden-Württemberg	BWGV	20	632 901 10
Raiffeisenbank Böllingertal eG	Heilbronn	Baden-Württemberg	BWGV	2	600 699 76
Volksbank Heilbronn eG	Heilbronn	Baden-Württemberg	BWGV	20	620 901 00
Raiffeisenbank Heroldstatt eG	Heroldstatt	Baden-Württemberg	BWGV	1	600 697 24
Volksbank Herrenberg-Rottenburg eG	Herrenberg	Baden-Württemberg	BWGV	37	603 913 10
Raiffeisenbank Rosenstein eG	Heubach	Baden-Württemberg	BWGV	6	613 617 22
Raiffeisenbank Horb eG	Horb	Baden-Württemberg	BWGV	6	600 697 98
Raiffeisenbank Ravensburg eG	Horgenzell	Baden-Württemberg	BWGV	8	650 625 77
Raiffeisenbank Vordere Alb eG	Hülben	Baden-Württemberg	BWGV	3	600 695 64
VR-Bank in Mittelbaden eG	Iffezheim	Baden-Württemberg	BWGV	13	665 623 00
Raiffeisenbank Kocher-Jagst eG	Ingelfingen	Baden-Württemberg	BWGV	21	600 697 14
Raiffeisenbank Ingersheim eG	Ingersheim	Baden-Württemberg	BWGV	2	600 696 39
Raiffeisenbank Ingoldingen eG	Ingoldingen	Baden-Württemberg	BWGV	2	600 693 08
Volksbank Jestetten eG	Jestetten	Baden-Württemberg	BWGV	3	684 915 00
Raiffeisenbank Ersingen eG	Kämpfelbach	Baden-Württemberg	BWGV	1	666 621 55
Spar- und Kreditbank Karlsruhe eG	Karlsruhe	Baden-Württemberg	BWGV	1	660 603 00
BBBank eG	Karlsruhe	Baden-Württemberg	BWGV	96	660 908 00
Volksbank Karlsruhe eG	Karlsruhe	Baden-Württemberg	BWGV	29 (+ 23 SB)	661 900 00
Kerner Volksbank eG	Kernen	Baden-Württemberg	BWGV	3	602 626 93
Raiffeisenbank Kieselbronn eG	Kieselbronn	Baden-Württemberg	BWGV	1	666 613 29
Raiffeisenbank Kraichgau eG	Kirchardt	Baden-Württemberg	BWGV	8	667 623 32
Raiffeisenbank Kirchheim-Walheim eG	Kirchheim	Baden-Württemberg	BWGV	2	600 694 17
Volksbank Stein Eisingen eG	Königsbach-Stein	Baden-Württemberg	BWGV	1	666 622 20
Volksbank Konstanz eG	Konstanz	Baden-Württemberg	BWGV	20	692 910 00
Korber Bank eG	Korb	Baden-Württemberg	BWGV	1	602 620 63
Volksbank Strohgäu eG	Korntal-Münchingen	Baden-Württemberg	BWGV	6	600 629 09
Volksbank Krautheim eG	Krautheim	Baden-Württemberg	BWGV	4	660 693 42
Volksbank Lahr eG	Lahr	Baden-Württemberg	BWGV	42	682 900 00
Volksbank Laichingen eG	Laichingen	Baden-Württemberg	BWGV	11	630 913 00
Raiffeisenbank Niedere Alb eG	Langenau	Baden-Württemberg	BWGV	5	600 690 66
VR-Bank Langenau-Ulmer Alb eG	Langenau	Baden-Württemberg	BWGV	19	630 614 86
Volksbank Laupheim eG	Laupheim	Baden-Württemberg	BWGV	15	654 913 20
Echterdinger Bank eG	Leinfelden-Echterdingen	Baden-Württemberg	BWGV	1	600 627 75
Volksbank Region Leonberg eG	Leonberg	Baden-Württemberg	BWGV	18	603 903 00
Leutkircher Bank Raiff.- u. Volksbank eG	Leutkirch	Baden-Württemberg	BWGV	14	650 910 40
Volksbank Limbach eG	Limbach	Baden-Württemberg	BWGV	4	674 623 68
Löchgauer Bank eG	Löchgau	Baden-Württemberg	BWGV	2	600 695 38
Volksbank Dreiländereck eG	Lörrach	Baden-Württemberg	BWGV	22	683 900 00
Volksbank Ludwigsburg eG	Ludwigsburg	Baden-Württemberg	BWGV	35	604 901 50
Volksbank Magstadt eG	Magstadt	Baden-Württemberg	BWGV	1	603 914 20
Volksbank Sandhofen eG	Mannheim	Baden-Württemberg	BWGV	6	670 600 31
VR Bank Rhein-Neckar eG	Mannheim	Baden-Württemberg	BWGV	42	670 900 00
Genossenschaftsbank Meckenbeuren eG	Meckenbeuren	Baden-Württemberg	BWGV	2	651 614 97
Raiffeisenbank Mehrstetten eG	Mehrstetten	Baden-Württemberg	BWGV	2	600 697 06
Volksbank Meßkirch eG Raiffeisenbank	Meßkirch	Baden-Württemberg	BWGV	13	693 620 32
Volksbank Heuberg eG	Meßstetten	Baden-Württemberg	BWGV	8	653 614 69
Volksbank Metzingen-Bad Urach eG	Metzingen	Baden-Württemberg	BWGV	18	640 912 00
Volksbank Möckmühl-Neuenstadt eG	Möckmühl	Baden-Württemberg	BWGV	14	620 916 00
VR-Bank Asperg-Markgröningen eG	Möglingen	Baden-Württemberg	BWGV	8	604 628 08
Volksbank Mosbach eG	Mosbach	Baden-Württemberg	BWGV	23	674 600 41
Volksbank Mössingen eG	Mössingen	Baden-Württemberg	BWGV	7	641 619 56
Raiffeisenbank Mötzingen eG	Mötzingen	Baden-Württemberg	BWGV	1	600 698 17
Raiffeisenbank Donau-Heuberg eG	Mühlheim	Baden-Württemberg	BWGV	11	643 613 59
Volksbank Müllheim eG	Müllheim	Baden-Württemberg	BWGV	10	680 919 00
Volksbank Münsingen eG	Münsingen	Baden-Württemberg	BWGV	27	640 913 00
Raiffeisenbank Mutlangen eG	Mutlangen	Baden-Württemberg	BWGV	9	613 619 75
Volksbank Nagoldtal eG	Nagold	Baden-Württemberg	BWGV	16	641 910 30
Raiffeisenbank Nattheim eG	Nattheim	Baden-Württemberg	BWGV	1	600 697 16
Raiffeisenbank im Kreis Calw eG	Neubulach	Baden-Württemberg	BWGV	17	606 630 84
Raiffeisenbank Neudenau-Stein-Herbolzheim eG	Neudenau	Baden-Württemberg	BWGV	3	667 624 33
Volksbank Filder eG	Neuhausen auf den Fildern	Baden-Württemberg	BWGV	6	611 616 96
Raiffeisenbank Bauschlott eG	Neulingen	Baden-Württemberg	BWGV	1	666 612 44
VR Bank im Enzkreis eG	Niefern-Öschelbronn	Baden-Württemberg	BWGV	11	666 614 54
Volksbank Kirchheim-Nürtingen eG	Nürtingen	Baden-Württemberg	BWGV	27	612 901 20
Nufringer Bank -Raiffeisen- eG	Nufringen	Baden-Württemberg	BWGV	1	600 695 45
Volksbank Bruhrain-Kraich-Hardt eG	Oberhausen-Rheinhausen	Baden-Württemberg	BWGV	17	663 916 00
Raiffeisenbank Oberstenfeld eG	Oberstenfeld	Baden-Württemberg	BWGV	1	600 697 27
Volksbank Sulmtal eG	Obersulm	Baden-Württemberg	BWGV	10	620 619 91
Raiffeisenbank Oberteuringen eG	Oberteuringen	Baden-Württemberg	BWGV	3	651 628 32
Raiffeisenbank Rottumtal eG	Ochsenhausen	Baden-Württemberg	BWGV	11	600 694 61
Volksbank Offenburg eG	Offenburg	Baden-Württemberg	BWGV	25	664 900 00
Volksbank Hohenlohe eG	Öhringen	Baden-Württemberg	BWGV	47	620 918 00
Scharnhauser Bank eG	Ostfildern	Baden-Württemberg	BWGV	2	600 695 17
Raiffeisenbank Ottenbach eG	Ottenbach	Baden-Württemberg	BWGV	1	600 694 57
Raiffeisenbank Teck eG	Owen	Baden-Württemberg	BWGV	8	612 612 13
Volksbank Nordschwarzwald eG	Pfalzgrafenweiler	Baden-Württemberg	BWGV	11	642 618 53
Volksbank Pforzheim eG	Pforzheim	Baden-Württemberg	BWGV	41	666 900 00
Volksbank Pfullendorf eG	Pfullendorf	Baden-Württemberg	BWGV	5	690 916 00
Volksbank Plochingen eG	Plochingen	Baden-Württemberg	BWGV	10	611 913 10
Volksbank Baden-Baden-Rastatt eG	Rastatt	Baden-Württemberg	BWGV	30	662 900 00
Volksbank Wilferdingen-Keltern eG	Remchingen	Baden-Württemberg	BWGV	14	666 923 00
Volksbank Remseck eG	Remseck am Neckar	Baden-Württemberg	BWGV	6	600 699 05
Raiffeisenbank Sondelfingen eG	Reutlingen	Baden-Württemberg	BWGV	1	600 691 47
Volksbank Reutlingen eG	Reutlingen	Baden-Württemberg	BWGV	28	640 901 00
Spar- und Kreditbank Rheinstetten eG	Rheinstetten	Baden-Württemberg	BWGV	4	660 614 07
Volksbank-Raiffeisenbank Riedlingen eG	Riedlingen	Baden-Württemberg	BWGV	27	654 915 10
Volksbank Kirnau eG	Rosenberg	Baden-Württemberg	BWGV	11	674 617 33
Raiffeisenbank Oberes Gäu eG	Rottenburg-Ergenzingen	Baden-Württemberg	BWGV	7	600 698 76
Volksbank Rottweil eG	Rottweil	Baden-Württemberg	BWGV	34	642 901 20
VR-Bank Schopfheim eG	Schopfheim	Baden-Württemberg	BWGV	10	683 915 00
Volksbank Schwarzwald-Neckar eG	Schramberg	Baden-Württemberg	BWGV	19	642 920 20
Volksbank Neckar-Bergstraße eG	Schriesheim	Baden-Württemberg	BWGV	9	670 915 00
Raiffeisenbank Schrozberg-Rot am See eG	Schrozberg	Baden-Württemberg	BWGV	12	600 695 95
Volksbank Schwäbisch Gmünd eG	Schwäbisch Gmünd	Baden-Württemberg	BWGV	19	613 901 40
Raiffeisenbank Tüngental eG	Schwäbisch Hall	Baden-Württemberg	BWGV	1	600 699 50
VR Bank Schwäbisch Hall eG	Schwäbisch Hall	Baden-Württemberg	BWGV	25	622 901 10
VBU Volksbank im Unterland eG	Schwaigern	Baden-Württemberg	BWGV	8	620 632 63
Raiffeisenbank Oberer Wald eG	Simmersfeld	Baden-Württemberg	BWGV	2	600 694 85
Darmsheimer Bank eG	Sindelfingen	Baden-Württemberg	BWGV	1	600 698 42
Vereinigte Volksbank AG	Sindelfingen	Baden-Württemberg	BWGV	46	603 900 00
Volksbank Hegau eG	Singen	Baden-Württemberg	BWGV	11	692 900 00
Volksbank Kraichgau eG	Sinsheim	Baden-Württemberg	BWGV	30	672 919 00
VR-Bank Alb eG	Sonnenbühl	Baden-Württemberg	BWGV	17	600 699 04
Volksbank Rot eG	St. Leon-Rot	Baden-Württemberg	BWGV	2	672 625 50
Volksbank Staufen eG	Staufen im Breisgau	Baden-Württemberg	BWGV	3	680 923 00
Raiffeisenbank Steinheim eG	Steinheim	Baden-Württemberg	BWGV	3	600 691 58
Raiffeisenbank Frankenhardt-Stimpfach eG	Stimpfach	Baden-Württemberg	BWGV	6	600 694 42
Volksbank Stutensee-Hardt eG	Stutensee	Baden-Württemberg	BWGV	8	660 610 59
Untertürkheimer Volksbank eG	Stuttgart	Baden-Württemberg	BWGV	6	600 603 96
Uhlbacher Bank eG	Stuttgart	Baden-Württemberg	BWGV	1	600 694 19
Stuttgarter Volksbank AG	Stuttgart	Baden-Württemberg	BWGV	36	600 901 00
Volksbank Zuffenhausen eG	Stuttgart	Baden-Württemberg	BWGV	10	600 903 00
Volksbank Main-Tauber eG	Wertheim	Baden-Württemberg	BWGV	48	673 900 00
Volksbank Tettnang eG	Tettnang	Baden-Württemberg	BWGV	14	651 915 00
Volksbank Triberg eG	Triberg im Schwarzwald	Baden-Württemberg	BWGV	5	694 917 00
Volksbank Trossingen eG	Trossingen	Baden-Württemberg	BWGV	6	642 923 10
Volksbank Tübingen eG	Tübingen	Baden-Württemberg	BWGV	17	641 901 10
Volksbank Donau-Neckar eG	Tuttlingen	Baden-Württemberg	BWGV	26	643 901 30
Volksbank Überlingen eG	Überlingen	Baden-Württemberg	BWGV	21	690 618 00
Volksbank Ulm-Biberach eG	Ulm	Baden-Württemberg	BWGV	38 (+ 13 SB)	630 901 00
Raiffeisenbank Eberhardzell-Ummendorf eG	Ummendorf	Baden-Württemberg	BWGV	9	600 696 48
Raiffeisenbank Urbach eG	Urbach	Baden-Württemberg	BWGV	1	600 698 32
Enztalbank eG	Vaihingen	Baden-Württemberg	BWGV	11	600 698 58
Raiffeisenbank Vellberg-Großaltdorf eG	Vellberg	Baden-Württemberg	BWGV	2	600 690 75
Volksbank Villingen eG	Villingen-Schwenningen	Baden-Württemberg	BWGV	30	694 900 00
Raiffeisenbank Kaiserstuhl eG	Vogtsburg im Kaiserstuhl	Baden-Württemberg	BWGV	4	680 634 79
Hegnacher Bank -Raiffeisen- eG	Waiblingen	Baden-Württemberg	BWGV	1	600 693 25
Volksbank Rems eG	Waiblingen	Baden-Württemberg	BWGV	50	602 901 10
Volksbank Schwarzbachtal eG	Waibstadt	Baden-Württemberg	BWGV	14	672 624 02
Volksbank Hochrhein eG	Waldshut-Tiengen	Baden-Württemberg	BWGV	16	684 922 00
Raiffeisenbank Wangen eG	Wangen	Baden-Württemberg	BWGV	4	600 696 85
Volksbank Allgäu-West eG	Wangen im Allgäu	Baden-Württemberg	BWGV	19	650 920 10
Raiffeisenbank Risstal eG	Warthausen	Baden-Württemberg	BWGV	15	654 618 78
Volksbank Vorbach-Tauber eG - Raiffeisen- und Volksbank-	Weikersheim	Baden-Württemberg	BWGV	6	623 914 20
Genossenschaftsbank Weil im Schönbuch eG	Weil im Schönbuch	Baden-Württemberg	BWGV	3	600 692 24
Volksbank Weingarten eG	Weingarten	Baden-Württemberg	BWGV	5	650 916 00
Volksbank Weingarten-Walzbachtal eG	Weingarten	Baden-Württemberg	BWGV	3	660 617 24
Volksbank Weinheim eG	Weinheim	Baden-Württemberg	BWGV	9	670 923 00
VR-Bank Weinstadt eG	Weinstadt	Baden-Württemberg	BWGV	4	602 616 22
Raiffeisenbank Weissach eG	Weissach	Baden-Württemberg	BWGV	2	603 619 23
Volksbank Welzheim eG	Welzheim	Baden-Württemberg	BWGV	3	613 914 10
Raiffeisenbank Westhausen eG	Westhausen	Baden-Württemberg	BWGV	3	600 695 44
Raiffeisenbank Wiesloch (Baiertal) eG	Wiesloch	Baden-Württemberg	BWGV	4	672 622 43
Volksbank Wiesloch eG	Wiesloch	Baden-Württemberg	BWGV	14 (+ 5 SB)	672 922 00
Raiffeisenbank Wimsheim-Mönsheim eG	Wimsheim	Baden-Württemberg	BWGV	2	606 619 06
Winterbacher Bank eG	Winterbach	Baden-Württemberg	BWGV	1	600 694 62
Winterlinger Bank eG	Winterlingen	Baden-Württemberg	BWGV	4	653 618 98
Volksbank Kinzigtal eG	Wolfach	Baden-Württemberg	BWGV	11	664 927 00
Genossenschaftsbank Wolfschlugen eG	Wolfschlugen	Baden-Württemberg	BWGV	1	612 622 58
Volksbank Klettgau-Wutöschingen eG	Wutöschingen	Baden-Württemberg	BWGV	8	684 624 27
Raiffeisenbank Wyhl eG	Wyhl am Kaiserstuhl	Baden-Württemberg	BWGV	1	680 627 30
Raiffeisenbank Adelzhausen-Sielenbach eG	Adelzhausen	Bavaria	GVB	5	720 690 02
Raiffeisenbank Aiglsbach eG	Aiglsbach	Bavaria	GVB	2	701 696 53
Raiffeisenbank Aindling eG	Aindling	Bavaria	GVB	6	720 690 05
Raiffeisenbank Aitrang-Ruderatshofen eG	Aitrang	Bavaria	GVB		733 698 51
Raiffeisenbank Obermain Nord eG	Altenkunstadt	Bavaria	GVB	17	770 610 04
Raiffeisenbank Altertheim eG	Altertheim	Bavaria	GVB		790 660 82
Raiffeisen-Volksbank in den Landkreisen Altötting-Mühldorf eG	Altötting	Bavaria	GVB	29	710 610 09
Raiffeisenbank im Allgäuer Land eG	Altusried	Bavaria	GVB	22	733 692 64
RV - Bank eG Alzenau	Alzenau	Bavaria	GVB	10	795 675 31
Volksbank-Raiffeisenbank Amberg eG	Amberg	Bavaria	GVB	9	752 900 00
Raiffeisenbank Anger eG	Anger (Berchtesgadener Land)	Bavaria	GVB	2	710 628 02
RaiffeisenVolksbank eG Gewerbebank Ansbach	Ansbach	Bavaria	GVB	28	765 600 60
Raiffeisenbank Aresing-Hörzhausen-Schiltberg eG	Aresing	Bavaria	GVB	3	721 690 13
Raiffeisenbank Schweinfurt eG	Arnstein / Schweinfurt	Bavaria	GVB	18	790 690 10
Raiffeisenbank Arnstorf eG	Arnstorf	Bavaria	GVB	7	743 612 11
Raiffeisenbank Aschaffenburg eG	Aschaffenburg	Bavaria	GVB	25	795 625 14
Volksbank Aschaffenburg eG	Aschaffenburg	Bavaria	GVB	4	795 900 00
Raiffeisenbank Aschau-Samerberg eG	Aschau im Chiemgau	Bavaria	GVB	4	711 628 04
Raiffeisenbank Sonnenwald eG	Auerbach (Landkreis Deggendorf)	Bavaria	GVB	7	741 650 13
Raiffeisenbank Auerbach-Freihung eG	Auerbach in der Oberpfalz	Bavaria	GVB	9	760 693 69
Handels- und Gewerbebank Augsburg eG	Augsburg	Bavaria	GVB	14	720 603 00
Augusta-Bank eG Raiffeisen-Volksbank Augsburg	Augsburg	Bavaria	GVB	27	720 900 00
Raiffeisenbank Bad Abbach-Saal eG	Bad Abbach	Bavaria	GVB	12	750 690 14
Volksbank Raiffeisenbank Bad Kissingen-Bad Brückenau eG	Bad Kissingen	Bavaria	GVB	34	790 650 28
VR-Bank Rhön-Grabfeld eG	Bad Neustadt an der Saale	Bavaria	GVB	16 (+ 24 SB)	793 630 16
Volksbank Raiffeisenbank OberBayern Südost eG	Bad Reichenhall	Bavaria	GVB	31	710 900 00
Raiffeisen-Volksbank Bad Staffelstein eG	Bad Staffelstein	Bavaria	GVB	9	770 621 39
Raiffeisenbank Tölzer Land eG	Bad Tölz	Bavaria	GVB	11	701 695 71
Raiffeisenbank Bad Windsheim eG	Bad Windsheim	Bavaria	GVB	12	760 693 72
VR-Bank Bamberg eG	Bamberg	Bavaria	GVB	41	770 601 00
Volksbank-Raiffeisenbank Bayreuth eG	Bayreuth	Bavaria	GVB	25	773 900 00
Raiffeisenbank Bechhofen eG	Bechhofen (Mittelfranken)	Bavaria	GVB		760 693 78
Raiffeisenbank Beilngries eG	Beilngries	Bavaria	GVB	3	721 693 80
Raiffeisenbank Iller-Roth-Günz eG	Bellenberg	Bavaria	GVB	22	720 697 36
Raiffeisenbank Berching-Freystadt-Mühlhausen eG	Berching	Bavaria	GVB	6	760 694 49
Raiffeisenbank Plankstetten AG	Berching	Bavaria		2	760 695 76
Raiffeisenbank Berg-Bad Steben eG	Berg (Oberfranken)	Bavaria	GVB	7	770 698 36
Raiffeisenbank Beuerberg-Eurasburg eG	Beuerberg	Bavaria	GVB	2	701 693 33
Raiffeisenbank Bibertal eG	Bibertal	Bavaria	GVB	2	720 691 26
Raiffeisenbank Bidingen eG	Bidingen	Bavaria	GVB	1	733 698 59
Raiffeisenbank Bissingen eG	Bissingen	Bavaria	GVB	2	720 690 34
Raiffeisenbank Bobingen eG	Bobingen	Bavaria	GVB	8 (+ 1 SB)	720 690 36
Raiffeisenbank Alxing-Bruck eG	Bruck (Oberbayern)	Bavaria	GVB		701 693 10
Raiffeisenbank Bruck eG	Bruck in der Oberpfalz	Bavaria	GVB	1	750 690 20
Raiffeisenbank Bütthard-Gaukönigshofen eG	Bütthard	Bavaria	GVB	6	790 690 31
Raiffeisenbank Burgau eG	Burgau	Bavaria	GVB	15	720 690 43
Raiffeisenbank Burgebrach eG	Burgebrach	Bavaria	GVB	8	770 620 14
VR-Bank Burglengenfeld eG	Burglengenfeld	Bavaria	GVB	5	750 914 00
Raiffeisenbank Oberferrieden-Burgthann eG	Burgthann	Bavaria	GVB	6	760 695 64
Raiffeisenbank Unteres Zusamtal eG	Buttenwiesen	Bavaria	GVB	3	720 691 79
Raiffeisenbank Cham-Roding-Furth im Wald eG	Cham (Oberpfalz)	Bavaria	GVB	26	742 610 24
VR-Bank Coburg eG	Coburg	Bavaria	GVB	39	783 600 00
Volksbank Raiffeisenbank Dachau eG	Dachau	Bavaria	GVB	25	700 915 00
Raiffeisenbank Uehlfeld-Dachsbach eG	Dachsbach	Bavaria	GVB	4	760 694 04
Raiffeisenbank Deggendorf-Plattling eG	Deggendorf	Bavaria	GVB	21	741 600 25
GenoBank DonauWald eG	Deggendorf	Bavaria	GVB	19	741 900 00
VR Bank München Land eG	Deisenhofen	Bavaria	GVB	32	701 664 86
Raiffeisenbank Dietenhofen eG	Dietenhofen	Bavaria	GVB		760 694 09
Raiffeisenbank Dietersheim und Umgebung eG	Dietersheim	Bavaria	GVB		760 694 10
Raiffeisen-Volksbank Dillingen eG	Dillingen an der Donau	Bavaria	GVB	9	722 624 01
Volksbank-Raiffeisenbank Dingolfing eG	Dingolfing	Bavaria	GVB	10	743 913 00
VR Bank Dinkelsbühl eG	Dinkelsbühl	Bavaria	GVB	20	765 910 00
Raiffeisenbank Oberpfalz Süd eG	Donaustauf	Bavaria	GVB	22	750 620 26
Raiffeisen-Volksbank Donauwörth eG	Donauwörth	Bavaria	GVB	35	722 901 00
Raiffeisen-Volksbank Ebern eG	Ebern	Bavaria	GVB	18	770 614 25
Raiffeisenbank Buch-Eching eG	Eching	Bavaria	GVB	4	743 696 62
Rottaler Volksbank-Raiffeisenbank eG	Eggenfelden	Bavaria	GVB	15	743 914 00
Raiffeisenbank Baisweil-Eggenthal-Friesenried eG	Eggenthal	Bavaria	GVB		733 698 71
Raiffeisenbank Nordkreis Landsberg eG	Egling an der Paar	Bavaria	GVB	4	701 693 51
Raiffeisenbank Ehekirchen-Oberhausen eG	Ehekirchen	Bavaria	GVB	5	721 697 45
Raiffeisenbank Eichenbühl und Umgebung eG	Eichenbühl	Bavaria	GVB		796 685 09
Volksbank Raiffeisenbank Eichstätt eG	Eichstätt	Bavaria	GVB	17	721 913 00
Raiffeisenbank Emtmannsberg eG	Emtmannsberg	Bavaria	GVB		770 697 46
VR-Bank Erding eG	Erding	Bavaria	GVB	8	700 919 00
Raiffeisenbank Erding eG	Erding	Bavaria	GVB	11	701 693 56
Raiffeisenbank Altdorf-Ergolding eG	Ergolding	Bavaria	GVB	11	743 626 63
Raiffeisen-Volksbank Erlangen-Höchstadt eG	Erlangen	Bavaria	GVB	23	763 600 33
Raiffeisenbank Elsavatal eG	Eschau	Bavaria	GVB	7	796 655 40
Raiffeisenbank Eschlkam-Lam-Lohberg-Neukirchen b. Hl. Blut eG	Eschlkam	Bavaria	GVB	7	750 691 10
Raiffeisenbank Essenbach eG	Essenbach	Bavaria	GVB	8	743 696 56
Raiffeisenbank Estenfeld-Bergtheim eG	Estenfeld	Bavaria	GVB	11	790 630 60
Raiffeisenbank Falkenstein-Wörth eG	Falkenstein	Bavaria	GVB	6	750 690 38
Raiffeisenbank Altdorf-Feucht eG	Feucht	Bavaria	GVB	7	760 694 40
VR-Bank Feuchtwangen-Limes eG	Feuchtwangen	Bavaria	GVB	12	760 694 41
Raiffeisenbank Floß eG	Floß	Bavaria	GVB		753 620 39
Volksbank Forchheim eG	Forchheim	Bavaria	GVB	25	763 910 00
Raiffeisenbank Frankenwinheim und Umgebung eG	Frankenwinheim	Bavaria	GVB		793 640 69
Freisinger Bank eG Volksbank-Raiffeisenbank	Freising	Bavaria	GVB	21	701 696 14
Raiffeisenbank Fuchstal-Denklingen eG	Fuchstal	Bavaria	GVB		733 698 54
Volksbank Raiffeisenbank Fürstenfeldbruck eG	Fürstenfeldbruck	Bavaria	GVB	27	701 633 70
Raiffeisen-Volksbank Fürth eG	Fürth	Bavaria	GVB	12	762 604 51
Raiffeisenbank Gaimersheim-Buxheim eG	Gaimersheim	Bavaria	GVB	8	721 698 12
VR-Bank, Raiffeisen-Volksbank im Lkr. Garmisch-Partenkirchen eG	Garmisch-Partenkirchen	Bavaria	GVB	13	703 900 00
Raiffeisenbank Gefrees eG	Gefrees	Bavaria	GVB	5	773 637 49
Raiffeisenbank Geiselhöring-Pfaffenberg eG	Geiselhöring	Bavaria	GVB	5	743 690 88
Raiffeisenbank Geisenhausen eG	Geisenhausen	Bavaria	GVB	5	743 666 66
Raiffeisenbank Obergermaringen eG	Germaringen	Bavaria	GVB		733 699 15
Raiffeisenbank Gerolsbach eG	Gerolsbach	Bavaria	GVB	2	721 690 80
VR-Bank Gerolzhofen eG	Gerolzhofen	Bavaria	GVB	12	793 620 81
VR-Bank Lech-Zusam eG	Gersthofen	Bavaria	GVB	28 (+ 1 SB)	720 621 52
Raiffeisenbank Westallgäu eG	Gestratz	Bavaria	GVB	12	733 698 23
Raiffeisenbank Gilching eG	Gilching	Bavaria	GVB	2	701 693 82
Raiffeisenbank Gmund am Tegernsee eG	Gmund am Tegernsee	Bavaria	GVB	5	701 693 83
Ver. Raiffeisenbank Gräfenberg-Forchheim-Eschenau-Heroldsberg eG	Gräfenberg	Bavaria	GVB	18	770 694 61
Raiffeisenbank Grafenwöhr-Kirchenthumbach eG	Grafenwöhr	Bavaria	GVB	3	750 690 50
Raiffeisen-Volksbank Ebersberg eG	Grafing	Bavaria	GVB	11	701 694 50
Raiffeisenbank Grainet eG	Grainet	Bavaria	GVB		740 697 44
Raiffeisenbank Greding-Thalmässing eG	Greding	Bavaria	GVB	5	760 694 62
Raiffeisenbank Tattenhausen-Großkarolinenfeld eG	Großkarolinenfeld	Bavaria	GVB		701 691 90
Raiffeisenbank Bachgau eG	Großostheim	Bavaria	GVB	6	795 613 48
Volksbank Günzburg eG	Günzburg	Bavaria	GVB	12	720 918 00
Raiffeisenbank Haag-Gars-Maitenbeth eG	Haag in Oberbayern	Bavaria	GVB	6 (+ 2 SB)	701 693 88
Raiffeisenbank Alteglofsheim-Hagelstadt eG	Hagelstadt	Bavaria	GVB	2	750 690 55
Raiffeisenbank Haibach-Obernau eG	Haibach (Unterfranken)	Bavaria	GVB	5	795 685 18
Raiffeisenbank Haldenwang eG	Haldenwang	Bavaria	GVB	3	733 698 81
Raiffeisenbank Griesstätt-Halfing eG	Halfing	Bavaria	GVB	4	701 691 32
Raiffeisenbank Hammelburg eG	Hammelburg	Bavaria	GVB	13	790 621 06
Raiffeisen-Volksbank Haßberge eG	Haßfurt	Bavaria	GVB	16	793 631 51
Raiffeisenbank i. Südl. Bayerischen Wald eG	Hauzenberg	Bavaria	GVB	7	740 667 49
Raiffeisenbank Heiligenstadt i. OFr. eG	Heiligenstadt	Bavaria	GVB		770 690 51
Raiffeisenbank Wüstenselbitz eG	Helmbrechts	Bavaria	GVB		770 699 06
Raiffeisenbank Hemau-Kallmünz eG	Hemau	Bavaria	GVB	9	750 690 61
Raiffeisenbank Hengersberg-Schöllnach eG	Hengersberg	Bavaria	GVB	9	741 616 08
Raiffeisenbank Heroldsbach eG	Heroldsbach	Bavaria	GVB		770 690 52
Raiffeisenbank Hersbruck eG	Hersbruck	Bavaria	GVB	16	760 614 82
Raiffeisenbank Herzogenaurach eG	Herzogenaurach	Bavaria	GVB	3	760 694 83
Raiffeisenbank Seebachgrund eG	Heßdorf	Bavaria	GVB	7	760 696 02
Raiffeisenbank am Rothsee eG	Hilpoltstein	Bavaria	GVB	6	764 614 85
Raiffeisenbank Hiltenfingen eG	Hiltenfingen	Bavaria	GVB	3	720 691 05
Raiffeisenbank Hirschau eG	Hirschau	Bavaria	GVB	5	760 694 86
Raiffeisenbank Höchberg eG	Höchberg	Bavaria	GVB	12	790 631 22
VR-Bank Hof eG	Hof (Saale)	Bavaria	GVB	29	780 608 96
Raiffeisenbank Hohenau-Mauth eG	Hohenau	Bavaria	GVB		740 697 52
Raiffeisenbank Höhenkirchen und Umgebung eG	Höhenkirchen	Bavaria	GVB	7	701 694 02
Raiffeisenbank Hollfeld-Waischenfeld-Aufseß eG	Hollfeld	Bavaria	GVB		773 657 92
Raiffeisenbank Aschberg eG	Holzheim (bei Dillingen an der Donau)	Bavaria	GVB	6	720 691 13
Raiffeisenbank Holzheim eG	Holzheim (bei Neu-Ulm)	Bavaria	GVB		720 691 14
Raiffeisenbank Holzkirchen-Otterfing eG	Holzkirchen	Bavaria	GVB	3	701 694 10
Raiffeisenbank Singoldtal eG	Hurlach	Bavaria	GVB		701 694 13
Raiffeisenbank Ichenhausen eG	Ichenhausen	Bavaria	GVB	7	720 691 19
Volksbank Immenstadt eG	Immenstadt	Bavaria	GVB	2	733 920 00
Raiffeisenbank Ingolstadt-Pfaffenhofen-Eichstätt eG	Ingolstadt	Bavaria	GVB	35	721 608 18
Raiffeisen-Volksbank Isen-Sempt eG	Isen	Bavaria	GVB	11	701 696 05
Volksbank Raiffeisenbank Ismaning eG	Ismaning	Bavaria	GVB	4	700 934 00
Raiffeisenbank Jettingen-Scheppach eG	Jettingen-Scheppach	Bavaria	GVB	3	720 691 23
Raiffeisenbank Kahl am Main eG	Kahl am Main	Bavaria	GVB	1	795 622 25
Raiffeisenbank Donaumooser Land eG	Karlshuld	Bavaria	GVB	9	721 697 64
Raiffeisenbank Karlstadt-Gemünden eG	Karlstadt	Bavaria	GVB	15	790 691 50
Landsberg-Ammersee Bank eG Volks- und Raiffeisenbank	Kaufering	Bavaria	GVB	19	700 916 00
Raiffeisenbank Kemnather Land - Steinwald eG	Kemnath	Bavaria	GVB	13	770 697 64
Raiffeisenbank Kempten eG	Kempten	Bavaria	GVB	16	733 699 02
Allgäuer Volksbank eG Kempten-Sonthofen	Kempten	Bavaria	GVB	9	733 900 00
VR Bank Kitzingen eG	Kitzingen	Bavaria	GVB	16	791 900 00
Raiffeisenbank Kötz eG	Kötz	Bavaria	GVB		720 690 90
Raiffeisenbank Bad Kötzting eG	Kötzting	Bavaria	GVB	7	750 690 81
Raiffeisen-Volksbank Kronach-Ludwigsstadt eG	Kronach	Bavaria	GVB	20	773 616 00
Raiffeisenbank Krumbach/Schwaben eG	Krumbach (Schwaben)	Bavaria	GVB	19	720 691 32
Raiffeisenbank Küps-Mitwitz-Stockheim eG	Küps	Bavaria	GVB	9	770 690 44
Kulmbacher Bank eG Raiffeisen-Volksbank	Kulmbach	Bavaria	GVB	16	771 900 00
Raiffeisenbank Hofkirchen-Bayerbach eG	Laberweinting	Bavaria	GVB	2	743 690 68
TEBA Kreditbank GmbH & Co. KG	Landau an der Isar	Bavaria	GVB	3	741 310 00
VR-Bank Landau eG	Landau an der Isar	Bavaria	GVB	14	741 910 00
VR-Bank Landshut eG	Landshut	Bavaria	GVB	10	743 900 00
Raiffeisenbank Schrobenhausener Land eG	Langenmosen	Bavaria	GVB	4	721 692 46
Raiffeisenbank Stauden eG	Langenneufnach	Bavaria	GVB	10	720 691 35
RAIFFEISEN - Spar + Kreditbank eG Lauf a.d.P.	Lauf an der Pegnitz	Bavaria	GVB	12	760 610 25
Raiffeisenbank Leiblfing eG	Leiblfing	Bavaria	GVB	4	743 690 91
Raiffeisen-Volksbank Lichtenfels-Itzgrund eG	Lichtenfels	Bavaria	GVB	14	770 918 00
Bayerische Bodenseebank -Raiffeisen- eG	Lindau	Bavaria	GVB	8	733 698 21
Volksbank Lindenberg eG	Lindenberg im Allgäu	Bavaria	GVB	6	733 698 26
Raiffeisenbank Lohr am Main eG	Lohr am Main	Bavaria	GVB	19	790 611 53
Raiffeisenbank Thalheim eG	Maria Thalheim	Bavaria	GVB	3	701 695 70
Raiffeisenbank Marktheidenfeld eG	Marktheidenfeld	Bavaria	GVB	13	790 651 60
Raiffeisenbank Oberland eG	Marktleugast	Bavaria	GVB	6	770 698 68
VR Bank Kaufbeuren-Ostallgäu eG	Marktoberdorf	Bavaria	GVB	27	734 600 46
VR-Bank Fichtelgebirge eG	Marktredwitz	Bavaria	GVB	16	781 600 69
Genobank Rhön-Grabfeld eG	Mellrichstadt	Bavaria	GVB	17	790 691 65
VR-Bank Memmingen eG	Memmingen	Bavaria	GVB	23	731 900 00
Raiffeisenbank Mengkofen-Loiching eG	Mengkofen	Bavaria	GVB	9	743 697 04
Raiffeisenbank Kissing-Mering eG	Mering	Bavaria	GVB	7	720 691 55
Raiffeisenbank im Oberland eG	Miesbach	Bavaria	GVB	14	701 695 98
Raiffeisen-Volksbank Miltenberg eG	Miltenberg	Bavaria	GVB	31	796 900 00
Genossenschaftsbank Unterallgäu eG	Mindelheim	Bavaria	GVB	18	731 600 00
Raiffeisenbank Mittenwald eG	Mittenwald	Bavaria	GVB		701 694 59
Raiffeisenbank Westkreis Fürstenfeldbruck eG	Moorenweis	Bavaria	GVB	5	701 694 60
Raiffeisenbank Neustadt-Vohenstrauß eG	Moosbach (Oberpfalz)	Bavaria	GVB	11	753 631 89
VR-Bank Burghausen-Mühldorf eG	Mühldorf am Inn	Bavaria	GVB	10	711 910 00
Hausbank München eG	München	Bavaria	GVB	5	700 901 00
Münchener Hypothekenbank eG	München	Bavaria	GVB	12	701 105 00
Genossenschaftsbank eG München	München	Bavaria	GVB	9	701 694 64
Raiffeisenbank München-Süd eG	München	Bavaria	GVB	7	701 694 66
Münchner Bank eG	München	Bavaria	GVB	37	701 900 00
Raiffeisenbank im Naabtal eG	Nabburg	Bavaria	GVB	19	750 691 71
Raiffeisen-Volksbank Neuburg/Donau eG	Neuburg an der Donau	Bavaria	GVB	26	721 697 56
Raiffeisenbank Hallbergmoos-Neufahrn eG	Neufahrn	Bavaria	GVB	5	701 694 72
Raiffeisenbank Unteres Inntal eG	Neuhaus am Inn	Bavaria	GVB	3	740 615 64
Raiffeisenbank Neumarkt i.d. OPf. eG	Neumarkt in der Oberpfalz	Bavaria	GVB	17	760 695 53
Raiffeisenbank Neumarkt-St. Veit-Niederbergkirchen eG	Neumarkt-Sankt Veit	Bavaria	GVB		701 694 74
Raiffeisenbank Neunkirchen am Brand eG	Neunkirchen am Brand	Bavaria	GVB		770 695 56
Raiffeisenbank am Dreisessel eG	Neureichenau	Bavaria	GVB		740 697 68
VR-Bank Uffenheim-Neustadt eG Raiffeisen-Volksbank	Neustadt an der Aisch	Bavaria	GVB	23	760 695 59
Raiffeisenbank Bad Gögging eG	Neustadt an der Donau	Bavaria	GVB	12	750 690 15
Volksbank Neu-Ulm eG	Neu-Ulm	Bavaria	GVB	14	730 900 00
Raiffeisenbank Fränkisches Weinland eG	Nordheim am Main	Bavaria	GVB	3	791 610 58
Raiffeisen-Volksbank Ries eG	Nördlingen	Bavaria	GVB	28	720 693 29
Raiffeisenbank Nüdlingen eG	Nüdlingen	Bavaria	GVB		790 691 81
Volksbank Raiffeisenbank Nürnberg eG	Nürnberg	Bavaria	GVB	20	760 606 18
EVENORD-BANK eG-KG	Nürnberg	Bavaria	GVB	2	760 904 00
Raiffeisenbank Knoblauchsland eG	Nürnberg-Buch	Bavaria	GVB		760 695 12
Raiffeisenbank Oberaudorf eG	Oberaudorf	Bavaria	GVB	3	711 623 55
Raiffeisenbank Kitzinger Land eG	Obernbreit	Bavaria	GVB	12	791 614 99
Raiffeisenbank Obernburg eG	Obernburg	Bavaria	GVB	15	796 665 48
Raiffeisenbank Taufkirchen-Oberneukirchen eG	Oberneukirchen	Bavaria	GVB		701 695 68
Raiffeisenbank Oberschleißheim eG	Oberschleißheim	Bavaria	GVB	3	701 694 93
Raiffeisenbank Chiemgau-Nord-Obing eG	Obing	Bavaria	GVB		701 691 65
Raiffeisenbank Ochsenfurt eG	Ochsenfurt	Bavaria	GVB	13	790 610 00
Raiffeisenbank Pfaffenhofen a.d. Glonn eG	Odelzhausen	Bavaria	GVB	4	701 691 86
Raiffeisenbank Offingen eG	Offingen	Bavaria	GVB		720 691 81
Raiffeisenbank Ortenburg eG	Ortenburg	Bavaria	GVB		740 616 70
Raiffeisenbank Parkstetten eG	Parkstetten	Bavaria	GVB	5	743 691 30
Raiffeisenbank Parsberg-Velburg eG	Parsberg	Bavaria	GVB	5	750 690 94
VR-Bank Passau eG	Passau	Bavaria	GVB	14	740 900 00
Raiffeisenbank Pfaffenwinkel eG	Peiting	Bavaria	GVB	14	701 695 09
Volksbank-Raiffeisenbank Penzberg eG	Penzberg	Bavaria	GVB	9	703 918 00
Raiffeisenbank Pfaffenhausen eG	Pfaffenhausen	Bavaria	GVB	10	720 697 89
Hallertauer Volksbank eG	Pfaffenhofen an der Ilm	Bavaria	GVB	27	721 916 00
VR-Bank Rottal-Inn eG	Pfarrkirchen	Bavaria	GVB	34	740 618 13
Raiffeisenbank Kirchweihtal eG	Pforzen	Bavaria	GVB	10	733 699 18
Raiffeisenbank Füssen-Pfronten-Nesselwang eG	Pfronten-Ried	Bavaria	GVB	10	733 698 78
Rottaler Raiffeisenbank eG	Pocking	Bavaria	GVB	12	740 670 00
Raiffeisenbank Rain am Lech eG	Rain	Bavaria	GVB	10	722 617 54
Raiffeisenbank Raisting eG	Raisting	Bavaria	GVB		701 695 21
Raiffeisenbank Maßbach eG	Rannungen	Bavaria	GVB	6	790 692 13
Raiffeisenbank Rattiszell-Konzell eG	Rattiszell	Bavaria	GVB	8	743 691 46
Raiffeisenbank Rechtmehring-Soyen-Albaching eG	Rechtmehring	Bavaria	GVB	4	701 695 24
VR-Bank eG Regen	Regen	Bavaria	GVB	16	741 641 49
Raiffeisenbank Regensburg-Wenzenbach eG	Regensburg	Bavaria	GVB	12	750 601 50
Volksbank Regensburg eG	Regensburg	Bavaria	GVB	10	750 900 00
LIGA Bank eG	Regensburg	Bavaria	GVB	12	750 903 00
Raiffeisenbank Regenstauf eG	Regenstauf	Bavaria	GVB	6	750 618 51
Raiffeisenbank Rehling eG	Rehling	Bavaria	GVB	2	720 691 93
Raiffeisenbank Reischach-Wurmannsquick-Zeilarn eG	Reischach	Bavaria	GVB	7	701 695 30
Raiffeisenbank Riedenburg-Lobsing eG	Riedenburg	Bavaria	GVB	7	721 698 31
Raiffeisenbank Roggenburg-Breithenthal eG	Roggenburg	Bavaria	GVB	4	720 692 09
Volksbank Raiffeisenbank Mangfalltal-Rosenheim eG	Rosenheim	Bavaria	GVB	33	711 600 00
VR Bank Rosenheim-Chiemsee eG	Rosenheim	Bavaria	GVB	49	711 601 61
Raiffeisenbank Südliches Ostallgäu eG	Rosshaupten	Bavaria	GVB	8	733 699 33
Raiffeisenbank Großhabersdorf-Roßtal eG	Roßtal	Bavaria	GVB	3	760 695 98
Raiffeisenbank Roth-Schwabach eG	Roth	Bavaria	GVB	15	764 600 15
VR-Bank Rothenburg ob der Tauber eG	Rothenburg ob der Tauber	Bavaria	GVB	12	760 696 01
Raiffeisenbank Pfeffenhausen-Rottenburg eG	Rottenburg an der Laaber	Bavaria	GVB	10	743 646 89
Raiffeisenbank Hallertau eG	Rudelzhausen	Bavaria	GVB	7	701 696 93
Raiffeisenbank Salzweg-Thyrnau eG	Salzweg	Bavaria	GVB	7	740 657 82
Raiffeisenbank St. Wolfgang-Schwindkirchen eG	Sankt Wolfgang	Bavaria	GVB	3	701 695 38
Raiffeisenbank Inkofen-Eggmühl eG	Schierling	Bavaria	GVB	3	750 690 74
Raiffeisenbank Ebrachgrund eG	Schlüsselfeld	Bavaria	GVB	8	770 690 91
Raiffeisenbank Unteres Vilstal eG	Schmidmühlen	Bavaria	GVB	6	760 696 11
Raiffeisenbank Schöllkrippen und Umgebung eG	Schöllkrippen	Bavaria	GVB	6 (+ 1 SB)	796 625 58
Raiffeisenbank Schrobenhausen eG	Schrobenhausen	Bavaria	GVB	5	721 692 18
Volksbank Schrobenhausen eG	Schrobenhausen	Bavaria	GVB	3	721 918 00
Raiffeisenbank Schwabmünchen eG	Schwabmünchen	Bavaria	GVB	8	720 692 20
Raiffeisenbank Schwandorf-Nittenau eG	Schwandorf	Bavaria	GVB	13	750 611 68
Raiffeisenbank Frankenwald Ost-Oberkotzau eG	Schwarzenbach am Wald	Bavaria	GVB	7	770 698 70
Raiffeisenbank südöstl. Starnberger See eG	Seeshaupt	Bavaria	GVB	7	701 693 31
VR-Bank eG Schweinfurt Land	Sennfeld	Bavaria	GVB	26	793 644 06
Raiffeisenbank Sinzing eG	Sinzing	Bavaria	GVB	4	750 690 78
Raiffeisenbank Oberallgäu-Süd eG	Sonthofen	Bavaria	GVB	25	733 699 20
Raiffeisenbank am Kulm eG	Speichersdorf	Bavaria	GVB		770 697 82
Volksbank Raiffeisenbank Starnberg-Herrsching-Landsberg eG	Starnberg	Bavaria	GVB	27	700 932 00
Raiffeisenbank Stegaurach eG	Stegaurach	Bavaria	GVB		770 651 41
Raiffeisenbank Steingaden eG	Steingaden	Bavaria	GVB	7	701 695 58
Raiffeisenbank Straubing eG	Straubing	Bavaria	GVB	22	742 601 10
Volksbank Straubing eG	Straubing	Bavaria	GVB	23	742 900 00
CB Credit-Bank GmbH	Straubing	Bavaria	GVB	3	742 901 00
Raiffeisenbank Sulzbach-Rosenberg eG	Sulzbach-Rosenberg	Bavaria	GVB	13	752 617 00
Raiffeisenbank Obereßfeld-Römhild eG	Sulzdorf an der Lederhecke	Bavaria	GVB	3	790 691 88
VR-Bank Taufkirchen-Dorfen eG	Taufkirchen (Vils)	Bavaria	GVB	13	701 695 66
Raiffeisenbank Rupertiwinkel eG	Teisendorf	Bavaria	GVB	10	701 691 91
Raiffeisenbank Thannhausen eG	Thannhausen	Bavaria	GVB		720 692 35
Raiffeisenbank Thüngersheim eG	Thüngersheim	Bavaria	GVB		790 692 71
Raiffeisenbank Thurnauer Land eG	Thurnau	Bavaria	GVB		770 697 39
Raiffeisenbank im Landkreis Passau-Nord eG	Tiefenbach (bei Passau)	Bavaria	GVB	11	740 627 86
Raiffeisenbank Kirchberg vorm Wald eG	Tiefenbach (bei Passau)	Bavaria	GVB		740 697 58
Raiffeisenbank Töpen eG	Töpen	Bavaria	GVB	2	770 698 93
Raiffeisenbank Trostberg-Traunreut eG	Traunreut	Bavaria	GVB	14	701 691 95
Raiffeisenbank Türkheim eG	Türkheim	Bavaria	GVB		701 695 75
Raiffeisen-Volksbank Tüßling-Unterneukirchen eG	Tüßling	Bavaria	GVB		701 695 76
Raiffeisenbank München-Nord eG	Unterschleißheim	Bavaria	GVB	12	701 694 65
Raiffeisenbank Lech-Ammersee eG	Vilgertshofen	Bavaria	GVB		701 695 41
VR-Bank Vilsbiburg eG	Vilsbiburg	Bavaria	GVB	12	743 923 00
Raiffeisenbank Vilshofener Land eG	Vilshofen	Bavaria	GVB	14	740 624 90
Volksbank Vilshofen eG	Vilshofen	Bavaria	GVB	7	740 924 00
Raiffeisenbank Volkach-Wiesentheid eG	Volkach	Bavaria	GVB	14	790 690 01
Raiffeisenbank Wald-Görisried eG	Wald	Bavaria	GVB		733 699 54
Raiffeisenbank Waldaschaff-Heigenbrücken eG	Waldaschaff	Bavaria	GVB	7	795 655 68
Raiffeisenbank Am Goldenen Steig eG	Waldkirchen	Bavaria	GVB	9	740 611 01
Raiffeisenbank im Stiftland eG	Waldsassen	Bavaria	GVB	15	781 615 75
Raiffeisenbank Wallgau-Krün eG	Wallgau	Bavaria	GVB		703 625 95
Raiffeisenbank Wegscheid eG	Wegscheid	Bavaria	GVB		740 645 93
Raiffeisenbank Weiden eG	Weiden in der Oberpfalz	Bavaria	GVB	21	753 600 11
Volksbank Nordoberpfalz eG	Weiden in der Oberpfalz	Bavaria	GVB	16	753 900 00
Raiffeisenbank Weil und Umgebung eG	Weil (Oberbayern)	Bavaria	GVB	1	701 695 99
Raiffeisenbank Weilheim eG	Weilheim in Oberbayern	Bavaria	GVB	14	701 696 02
Raiffeisenbank Weißenburg-Gunzenhausen eG	Weißenburg in Bayern	Bavaria	GVB	41	760 694 68
VR-Bank Neu-Ulm / Weißenhorn eG	Weißenhorn	Bavaria	GVB	14	730 611 91
Raiffeisen-Volksbank Wemding eG	Wemding	Bavaria	GVB	9	720 693 08
Raiffeisenbank Wildenberg eG	Wildenberg	Bavaria	GVB	1	743 697 09
Raiffeisenbank Heilsbronn-Windsbach eG	Windsbach	Bavaria	GVB	10	760 696 63
Raiffeisenbank Wittislingen eG	Wittislingen	Bavaria	GVB		720 692 63
Raiffeisenbank Isar-Loisachtal eG	Wolfratshausen	Bavaria	GVB	12	701 695 43
Volksbank Raiffeisenbank Würzburg eG	Würzburg	Bavaria	GVB	50	790 900 00
Raiffeisenbank Sparneck-Stammbach-Zell eG	Zell im Fichtelgebirge	Bavaria	GVB	3	770 699 08
Raiffeisenbank Zirndorf eG	Zirndorf	Bavaria	GVB	4	760 696 69
Raiffeisenbank Zorneding eG	Zorneding	Bavaria	GVB	8	701 696 19
Raiffeisenbank Augsburger Land West eG	Zusmarshausen	Bavaria	GVB	16	720 692 74
Berliner Volksbank eG	Berlin	Berlin	GV	155	100 900 00
Raiffeisen-Volksbank Oder-Spree eG	Beeskow	Brandenburg	GV	9	170 624 28
Brandenburger Bank Volksbank-Raiffeisenbank eG	Brandenburg	Brandenburg	GV	21	160 620 73
VR Bank Lausitz eG	Cottbus	Brandenburg	GV	19	180 626 78
VR Bank Forst eG	Forst	Brandenburg	GV	5	180 627 58
Volks- und Raiffeisenbank Fürstenwalde Seelow Wriezen eG	Fürstenwalde	Brandenburg	GV	13	170 924 04
VR-Bank Fläming eG	Luckenwalde	Brandenburg	GV	17	160 620 08
Spreewaldbank eG Volksbank-Raiffeisenbank	Lübben	Brandenburg	GV	11	180 926 84
Raiffeisenbank Ostprignitz-Ruppin eG	Neuruppin	Brandenburg	GV	11	160 619 38
Volks- und Raiffeisenbank Prignitz eG	Perleberg	Brandenburg	GV	15	160 601 22
Volksbank Uckermark eG	Prenzlau	Brandenburg	GV	16	150 917 04
Volksbank Rathenow eG	Rathenow	Brandenburg	GV	11	160 919 94
Volksbank Spremberg-Bad Muskau eG	Spremberg	Brandenburg	GV	3	180 927 44
Bremische Volksbank eG	Bremen	Bremen	GV	8	291 900 24
Volksbank Bremen-Nord eG	Bremen	Bremen	GV	13	291 903 30
EDEKABANK AG	Hamburg	Hamburg	GV	1	200 907 00
Hamburger Volksbank eG	Hamburg	Hamburg	GV	44	201 900 03
Vierländer Volksbank eG	Hamburg	Hamburg	GV	4	201 903 01
Volksbank Überwald- Gorxheimertal eG	Abtsteinach	Hesse	GV	6	509 616 85
Raiffeisenbank Nördliche Bergstraße eG	Alsbach-Hähnlein	Hesse	GV	2	508 615 01
VR Bank HessenLand eG	Alsfeld	Hesse	GV	32	530 932 00
Raiffeisenbank Bad Hersfeld eG	Bad Hersfeld	Hesse	GV	2	532 601 45
VR-Bank Bad Hersfeld-Rotenburg eG	Bad Hersfeld	Hesse	GV	17	532 900 00
Spar- und Kreditbank Evangelisch-Freikirchlicher Gemeinden eG	Bad Homburg vor der Höhe	Hesse	GV	1	500 696 93
Raiffeisenbank Baunatal eG	Baunatal	Hesse	GV	17	520 641 56
Bankverein Bebra eG	Bebra	Hesse	GV	1	532 612 02
Volksbank Schupbach eG	Beselich	Hesse	GV	3	511 918 00
VR Bank Biedenkopf-Gladenbach eG	Biedenkopf	Hesse	GV	31	517 624 34
Raiffeisenbank Vogelsberg eG	Birstein	Hesse	GV	6	507 633 19
Birsteiner Volksbank eG	Birstein	Hesse	GV	2	507 933 00
Raiffeisenbank Borken eG	Borken (Hessen)	Hesse	GV	8	520 613 03
Volksbank Büdingen eG	Büdingen	Hesse	GV	16	507 613 33
Raiffeisenbank Ried eG	Bürstadt	Hesse	GV	7	509 612 06
Raiffeisenbank Burghaun eG	Burghaun	Hesse	GV	2	520 690 13
Raiffeisenbank Langenschwarz eG	Burghaun	Hesse	GV		520 690 65
Volksbank Butzbach eG	Butzbach	Hesse	GV	8	518 614 03
Weiseler Volksbank eG	Butzbach-Nieder-Weisel	Hesse	GV	3	518 626 77
Raiffeisenbank Calden eG	Calden	Hesse	GV	11	520 652 20
Volksbank Darmstadt eG	Darmstadt	Hesse	GV	9	508 900 00
Volksbank Dill eG	Dillenburg	Hesse	GV	28	516 900 00
Volksbank Langendernbach eG	Dornburg	Hesse	GV	6	511 616 06
Raiffeisenbank Ebsdorfergrund eG	Ebsdorfergrund	Hesse	GV	4	533 617 24
Volksbank Eltville eG	Eltville	Hesse	GV	7	510 914 00
Volksbank Eppertshausen eG	Eppertshausen	Hesse	GV	1	508 655 03
VR Diskontbank GmbH	Eschborn	Hesse		1	500 902 00
Volksbank Feldatal eG	Feldatal	Hesse	GV	2	519 618 01
Raiffeisenbank Flieden eG	Flieden	Hesse	GV	4	530 640 23
Frankenberger Bank eG	Frankenberg (Eder)	Hesse	GV	14	520 695 19
Frankfurter Volksbank eG	Frankfurt a.M.	Hesse	GV	29	501 900 00
Volksbank Höchst a.M. eG	Frankfurt a.M.	Hesse	GV	8	501 903 00
Volksbank Griesheim eG	Frankfurt a.M.	Hesse	GV	5	501 904 00
VR Genossenschaftsbank Fulda eG	Fulda	Hesse	GV	31	530 601 80
Rheingauer Volksbank eG	Geisenheim	Hesse	GV	19	510 915 00
VR Bank Bad Orb-Gelnhausen eG	Gelnhausen	Hesse	GV	9	507 900 00
Spar- und Kredit-Bank Gemünden eG	Gemünden	Hesse	GV	5	520 690 29
Volksbank Mittelhessen eG	Gießen	Hesse	GV	104	513 900 00
Volksbank Mainspitze eG	Ginsheim-Gustavsburg	Hesse	GV	10	508 629 03
Raiffeisenbank Grävenwiesbach eG	Grävenwiesbach	Hesse	GV	3	500 693 45
Volksbank Grebenhain eG	Grebenhain	Hesse	GV	3	500 691 46
Vereinigte Volksbank Griesheim-Weiterstadt eG	Griesheim	Hesse	GV	4 (+1 SB)	508 624 08
Raiffeisenbank Großenlüder eG	Großenlüder	Hesse	GV	12	530 620 35
Groß-Gerauer Volksbank eG	Groß-Gerau	Hesse	GV	22	508 925 00
RBank Raiffeisenbank Groß-Rohrheim eG	Groß-Rohrheim	Hesse	GV	2	509 613 12
VR-Bank Chattengau eG	Gudensberg	Hesse	GV	10	520 622 00
Raiffeisenbank Haunetal eG	Haunetal	Hesse	GV	4	532 620 73
Volksbank Bergstraße eG	Heppenheim	Hesse	GV	9	509 601 01
Volksbank Herborn-Eschenburg eG	Herborn	Hesse	GV	6	516 915 00
Spar- und Darlehnskasse Stockhausen eG	Herbstein	Hesse	GV	1	519 615 15
Raiffeisenbank Werratal-Landeck eG	Heringen (Werra)	Hesse	GV	12	532 613 42
VR-Bank Werra-Meißner eG	Hessisch Lichtenau	Hesse	GV	16	522 603 85
Volksbank Heuchelheim eG	Heuchelheim	Hesse	GV	12	513 610 21
VR-Bank Schwalm-Eder Volksbank Raiffeisenbank eG	Homberg (Efze)	Hesse	GV	9	520 626 01
VR-Bank NordRhön eG	Hünfeld	Hesse	GV	21	530 612 30
Hüttenberger Bank eG	Hüttenberg	Hesse	GV	1	500 694 55
VR-Bank Untertaunus eG	Idstein	Hesse	GV	21	510 917 00
Kurhessische Landbank eG	Kassel	Hesse	GV	1	520 602 08
Evangelische Kreditgenossenschaft eG	Kassel	Hesse	GV	13	520 604 10
Kasseler Bank eG	Kassel	Hesse	GV	35	520 900 00
Volksbank Main-Taunus eG	Kelkheim	Hesse	GV	26	500 922 00
Raiffeisenbank Kirtorf eG	Kirtorf	Hesse	GV	3	500 694 77
Waldecker Bank eG	Korbach	Hesse	GV	25	523 600 59
Volksbank Kreis Bergstraße eG	Lampertheim	Hesse	GV	11	509 914 00
Volksbank Dreieich eG	Langen	Hesse	GV	20	505 922 00
VR Bank Main-Kinzig eG	Langenselbold	Hesse	GV	37	506 616 39
Volksbank Lauterbach-Schlitz eG	Lauterbach (Hessen)	Hesse	GV	10	519 900 00
Vereinigte Volksbank Limburg eG	Limburg	Hesse	GV	16	511 900 00
DZB - Die Zentralregulierungsbank GmbH	Mainhausen	Hesse	GV	1	506 913 00
Volksbank Odenwald eG	Michelstadt	Hesse	GV	40	508 635 13
Volksbank Ober-Mörlen eG	Ober-Mörlen	Hesse	GV	1	518 618 06
Volksbank Modau eG	Ober-Ramstadt	Hesse	GV	5	508 643 22
Vereinigte Volksbank Maingau eG	Obertshausen-Hausen	Hesse	GV	45	505 613 15
Raiffeisenbank Oberursel eG	Oberursel	Hesse	GV	6	500 617 41
Raiffeisenbank Offenbach/M.-Bieber eG	Offenbach am Main	Hesse	GV	2	505 601 02
Raiffeisenbank Biebergrund-Petersberg eG	Petersberg	Hesse	GV	7	530 623 50
Landbank Horlofftal eG	Reichelsheim (Wetterau)	Hesse	GV	9	518 616 16
Volksbank Weschnitztal eG	Rimbach	Hesse	GV	6	509 615 92
Raiffeisenbank Rodenbach eG	Rodenbach	Hesse	GV	1	506 636 99
Raiffeisenbank Ronshausen-Marksuhl eG	Ronshausen	Hesse	GV	12	532 624 55
Rüsselsheimer Volksbank eG	Rüsselsheim	Hesse	GV	10	500 930 00
Raiffeisenbank Schaafheim eG	Schaafheim	Hesse	GV	2	508 628 35
Volksbank Raiffeisenbank Schlüchtern eG	Schlüchtern	Hesse	GV	6	530 613 13
Volksbank Seeheim-Jugenheim eG	Seeheim-Jugenheim	Hesse	GV	2	508 648 08
Volksbank Seligenstadt eG	Seligenstadt	Hesse	GV	5	506 921 00
VR-Bank Spangenberg-Morschen eG	Spangenberg	Hesse	GV	3	520 633 69
Raiffeisenbank Trendelburg eG	Trendelburg	Hesse	GV	4	520 691 03
Volksbank Ulrichstein eG	Ulrichstein	Hesse	GV	7	519 610 23
Raiffeisenbank Volkmarsen eG	Volkmarsen	Hesse	GV	8	520 691 49
Volksbank Brandoberndorf eG	Waldsolms	Hesse	GV	1	515 913 00
Volksbank Wißmar eG	Wettenberg	Hesse	GV	1	500 699 76
Wiesbadener Volksbank eG	Wiesbaden	Hesse	GV	24	510 900 00
Raiffeisenbank Wolfhagen eG	Wolfhagen	Hesse	GV	14	520 635 50
Raiffeisenbank Bad Doberan eG	Bad Doberan	Mecklenburg-Vorpommern	GV	6	130 611 28
Volksbank Demmin eG	Demmin	Mecklenburg-Vorpommern	GV	5	150 916 74
Volksbank Raiffeisenbank Greifswald eG	Greifswald	Mecklenburg-Vorpommern	GV	20	150 616 38
Volks- und Raiffeisenbank Güstrow eG	Güstrow	Mecklenburg-Vorpommern	GV	16	140 613 08
Raiffeisenbank Büchen eG	Hagenow	Mecklenburg-Vorpommern	GV	11	230 641 07
Raiffeisenbank Malchin eG	Malchin	Mecklenburg-Vorpommern	GV	9	150 616 98
Rostocker Volks- und Raiffeisenbank eG	Rostock	Mecklenburg-Vorpommern	GV	8	130 900 00
VR-Bank Schwerin eG	Schwerin	Mecklenburg-Vorpommern	GV	14	140 914 64
Pommersche Volksbank eG	Stralsund	Mecklenburg-Vorpommern	GV	27	130 910 54
Raiffeisenbank Pasewalk-Strasburg eG	Strasburg	Mecklenburg-Vorpommern	GV	2	150 616 58
Raiffeisenbank Mecklenburger Seenplatte eG	Waren	Mecklenburg-Vorpommern	GV	19	150 616 18
Volks- und Raiffeisenbank Wismar eG	Wismar	Mecklenburg-Vorpommern	GV	19	130 610 78
Volksbank Wolgast eG	Wolgast	Mecklenburg-Vorpommern	GV	9	130 610 08
Volksbank Adelebsen eG	Adelebsen	Lower Saxony	GV	5	260 615 56
Volksbank Aerzen eG	Aerzen	Lower Saxony	GV	4	254 912 73
Volksbank Ahlerstedt eG	Ahlerstedt	Lower Saxony	GV	2	200 697 80
Volksbank Geest eG, Harsefeld	Apensen	Lower Saxony	GV	12	200 697 82
Raiffeisen-Volksbank Aurich eG	Aurich	Lower Saxony	GVWE	21	285 622 97
Volksbank Oberharz eG	Bad Grund (Harz)	Lower Saxony	GV		263 612 99
Volksbank Bad Münder eG	Bad Münder	Lower Saxony	GV	8	254 917 44
Volksbank Bakum eG	Bakum	Lower Saxony	GVWE	1	280 636 07
Volksbank Diepholz-Barnstorf eG	Barnstorf	Lower Saxony	GV	5	250 695 03
Volksbank Syke eG	Bassum	Lower Saxony	GV	19	291 676 24
Volksbank Bremerhaven-Cuxland eG	Beverstedt	Lower Saxony	GV	25	292 657 47
Volksbank Wittlage eG	Bohmte	Lower Saxony	GVWE	5	265 626 94
Volksbank Nordhümmling eG	Börger	Lower Saxony	GVWE	6	280 697 06
Volksbank Börßum-Hornburg eG	Börßum	Lower Saxony	GV	5	270 622 90
Volksbank Bösel eG	Bösel	Lower Saxony	GVWE	2	280 629 13
Raiffeisenbank Wesermarsch-Süd eG	Brake	Lower Saxony	GVWE	9	280 614 10
Volksbank Bramgau eG im Osnabrücker Land	Bramsche	Lower Saxony	GVWE	11	265 639 60
Volksbank Braunlage eG	Braunlage	Lower Saxony	GV		278 933 59
Volksbank Nordheide eG	Buchholz	Lower Saxony	GV	29	240 603 00
Raiffeisenbank Butjadingen-Abbehausen eG	Butjadingen	Lower Saxony	GVWE	6	280 682 18
Volksbank Essen-Cappeln eG	Cappeln	Lower Saxony	GVWE	5	280 635 26
Volksbank Südheide eG	Celle	Lower Saxony	GV	29	257 916 35
Volksbank Clenze-Hitzacker eG	Clenze	Lower Saxony	GV	6	258 619 90
Volksbank Cloppenburg eG	Cloppenburg	Lower Saxony	GVWE	5	280 615 01
Volksbank am Ith eG	Coppenbrügge	Lower Saxony	GV	7	254 626 80
Volksbank Dammer Berge eG	Damme	Lower Saxony	GVWE	4	280 616 79
Volksbank Osterburg-Lüchow-Dannenberg eG	Dannenberg	Lower Saxony	GV	21	258 634 89
Volksbank eG, Dassel	Dassel	Lower Saxony	GV	1	262 613 96
Volks- und Raiffeisenbank eG Leinebergland	Delligsen	Lower Saxony	GV	4	250 691 68
Raiffeisen-Volksbank Delmenhorst-Schierbrok eG	Delmenhorst	Lower Saxony	GVWE	11	280 671 70
VR BANK Dinklage-Steinfeld eG	Dinklage	Lower Saxony	GVWE	2	280 651 08
Volksbank eG Dransfeld Groß Schneen Hann. Münde	Dransfeld	Lower Saxony	GV	11	260 624 33
Volksbank Kehdingen eG	Drochtersen	Lower Saxony	GV	8	200 697 86
Volksbank Eichsfeld-Northeim eG	Duderstadt	Lower Saxony	GV	26	260 612 91
Volksbank Einbeck eG	Einbeck	Lower Saxony	GV	13	262 614 92
Volksbank Emstek eG	Emstek	Lower Saxony	GVWE	5	280 691 09
Volksbank Esens eG	Esens	Lower Saxony	GVWE	9	282 915 51
Volksbank eG, Fredenbeck	Fredenbeck	Lower Saxony	GV	3	200 698 12
Spar- und Darlehnskasse Friesoythe eG	Friesoythe	Lower Saxony	GVWE	7	280 666 20
Volksbank Osnabrücker Nordland eG	Fürstenau	Lower Saxony	GVWE	5	265 669 39
Volksbank Bookholzberg-Lemwerder eG	Ganderkesee	Lower Saxony	GVWE	2	280 627 40
Raiffeisenbank Garrel eG	Garrel	Lower Saxony	GVWE	1	280 691 28
Volksbank GMHütte-Hagen-Bissendorf eG	Georgsmarienhütte	Lower Saxony	GVWE	11	265 659 28
Volksbank Nordharz eG	Goslar	Lower Saxony	GV	16	268 900 19
Volksbank Göttingen eG	Göttingen	Lower Saxony	GV	23	260 900 50
Volksbank Hameln-Stadthagen eG	Hameln	Lower Saxony	GV	33	254 621 60
Spar- und Kreditbank Hammah eG	Hammah	Lower Saxony	GV	6	200 698 00
Volksbank Hankensbüttel-Wahrenholz eG	Hankensbüttel	Lower Saxony	GV	6	257 915 16
Hannoversche Volksbank eG	Hannover	Lower Saxony	GV	95	251 900 01
Volksbank Solling eG	Hardegsen	Lower Saxony	GV	13	262 616 93
Volksbank Haselünne eG	Haselünne	Lower Saxony	GVWE	5	266 613 80
VR Bank Oldenburg Land West eG	Hatten	Lower Saxony	GVWE	6	280 690 92
Volksbank Helmstedt eG	Helmstedt	Lower Saxony	GV	11	271 900 82
Volksbank Hildesheim eG	Hildesheim	Lower Saxony	GV	23	259 900 11
Volksbank Bad Laer-Borgloh-Hilter-Melle eG	Hilter	Lower Saxony	GVWE	9	265 624 90
Volksbank Weserbergland eG	Holzminden	Lower Saxony	GV	12	272 900 87
Volksbank Grafschaft Hoya eG	Hoya	Lower Saxony	GV	12	256 635 84
Volksbank Ganderkesee-Hude eG	Hude	Lower Saxony	GVWE	8	280 622 49
Volksbank Jever eG	Jever	Lower Saxony	GVWE	21	282 622 54
Raiffeisenbank Emsland-Mitte eG	Klein Berßen	Lower Saxony	GVWE	6	280 698 78
Spar- und Darlehnskasse Börde Lamstedt-Hechthausen eG	Lamstedt	Lower Saxony	GV	3	241 628 98
Volksbank Langen-Gersten eG	Langen	Lower Saxony	GVWE	2	280 699 30
Volksbank Lastrup eG	Lastrup	Lower Saxony	GVWE		280 672 57
Volksbank Emstal eG	Lathen	Lower Saxony	GVWE	9	280 699 91
Ostfriesische Volksbank eG	Leer	Lower Saxony	GVWE	19	285 900 75
Volksbank Lengerich eG	Lengerich	Lower Saxony	GVWE	1	266 629 32
Volksbank Lingen eG	Lingen (Ems)	Lower Saxony	GVWE	13	266 600 60
Volksbank Lohne-Mühlen eG	Lohne	Lower Saxony	GVWE	4	280 625 60
Volksbank Löningen eG	Löningen	Lower Saxony	GVWE	2	280 650 61
Raiffeisenbank Lorup eG	Lorup	Lower Saxony	GVWE	1	280 699 35
Volksbank Lüneburger Heide eG	Lüneburg	Lower Saxony	GV	40	258 916 36
Volksbank Winsener Marsch eG	Marschacht	Lower Saxony	GV	3	200 699 65
Emsländische Volksbank eG	Meppen	Lower Saxony	GVWE	17	266 614 94
Raiffeisenbank Moormerland eG	Moormerland	Lower Saxony	GVWE	13	285 637 49
VR-Bank eG im Altkreis Bersenbrück	Neuenkirchen	Lower Saxony	GVWE	2	265 679 43
Volksbank Neuenkirchen-Vörden eG	Neuenkirchen-Vörden	Lower Saxony	GVWE	2	280 670 68
Raiffeisen-Volksbank eG, Neustadt (am Rbg.)	Neustadt am Rübenberge	Lower Saxony	GV	5	250 692 62
Volksbank Nienburg eG	Nienburg	Lower Saxony	GV	18	256 900 09
Raiffeisen-Volksbank Fresena eG	Norden	Lower Saxony	GVWE	21	283 615 92
Grafschafter Volksbank eG	Nordhorn	Lower Saxony	GVWE	15	280 699 56
Raiffeisenbank Oldenburg eG	Oldenburg	Lower Saxony	GVWE	22	280 602 28
Volksbank Oldenburg eG	Oldenburg	Lower Saxony	GVWE	22	280 618 22
Volksbank Oldendorf eG	Oldendorf	Lower Saxony	GV	5	200 698 15
Volksbank Osnabrück eG	Osnabrück	Lower Saxony	GVWE	16	265 900 25
Volksbank Osterholz-Scharmbeck eG	Osterholz-Scharmbeck	Lower Saxony	GV	20	291 623 94
Volksbank im Harz eG	Osterode	Lower Saxony	GV	13	268 914 84
Raiffeisenbank Strücklingen-Idafehn eG	Ostrhauderfehn	Lower Saxony	GVWE	3	280 690 52
Volksbank Oyten eG	Oyten	Lower Saxony	GV	1	291 655 45
Volksbank Pattensen eG	Pattensen	Lower Saxony	GV	30	251 933 31
Volksbank Peine eG	Peine	Lower Saxony	GV	14	252 600 10
Raiffeisenbank Rastede eG	Rastede	Lower Saxony	GVWE	4	280 621 65
Volksbank Westrhauderfehn eG	Rhauderfehn	Lower Saxony	GVWE	9	285 916 54
Volksbank in Schaumburg eG	Rinteln	Lower Saxony	GV	24	255 914 13
Raiffeisenbank Rosdorf eG	Rosdorf	Lower Saxony	GV	13	260 625 75
Raiffeisenbank Scharrel eG	Saterland	Lower Saxony	GVWE	4	280 652 86
Volksbank Geeste-Nord eG	Schiffdorf	Lower Saxony	GV	5	292 627 22
Volksbank Schwanewede eG	Schwanewede	Lower Saxony	GV	1	291 624 53
Volksbank Seesen eG	Seesen	Lower Saxony	GV	24	278 937 60
Volksbank Hildesheimer Börde eG	Söhlde	Lower Saxony	GV	21	259 915 28
Volksbank Sottrum eG	Sottrum	Lower Saxony	GV	12	291 656 81
Volksbank Süd-Emsland eG	Spelle	Lower Saxony	GVWE	12	280 699 94
Volksbank Stade-Cuxhaven eG	Stade	Lower Saxony	GV	17	241 910 15
Volksbank Steyerberg eG	Steyerberg	Lower Saxony	GV	12	256 625 40
Volksbank Sulingen eG	Sulingen	Lower Saxony	GV	17	256 916 33
Volksbank Niedergrafschaft eG	Uelsen	Lower Saxony	GVWE	6	280 699 26
Volksbank Uelzen-Salzwedel eG	Uelzen	Lower Saxony	GV	17	258 622 92
Raiffeisen-Volksbank Varel-Nordenham eG	Varel	Lower Saxony	GVWE	16	282 626 73
Volksbank Vechta eG	Vechta	Lower Saxony	GVWE	12	280 641 79
Volksbank Verden eG	Verden	Lower Saxony	GV	10	291 626 97
Volksbank Visbek eG	Visbek	Lower Saxony	GVWE	2	280 661 03
Volksbank Vechelde-Wendeburg eG	Wendeburg	Lower Saxony	GV	9	250 693 70
Hümmlinger Volksbank eG	Werlte	Lower Saxony	GVWE	3	280 693 81
Volksbank Westerstede eG	Westerstede	Lower Saxony	GVWE	4	280 632 53
Raiffeisenbank Flachsmeer eG	Westoverledingen	Lower Saxony	GVWE	2	285 627 16
Raiffeisenbank Wiesedermeer-Wiesede-Marcardsmoor eG	Wiesedermeer	Lower Saxony	GVWE	1	280 697 73
Volksbank Wildeshauser Geest eG	Wildeshausen	Lower Saxony	GVWE	3	280 662 14
Volksbank Wilhelmshaven eG	Wilhelmshaven	Lower Saxony	GV	7	282 900 63
Volksbank Wittingen-Klötze eG	Wittingen	Lower Saxony	GV	13	257 618 94
Volksbank Wolfenbüttel-Salzgitter eG	Wolfenbüttel	Lower Saxony	GV	27	270 925 55
Volksbank Braunschweig Wolfsburg eG	Wolfsburg	Lower Saxony	GV	42	269 910 66
Volksbank Worpswede eG	Worpswede	Lower Saxony	GV	2	291 665 68
Volksbank Wulfsen eG	Wulfsen	Lower Saxony	GV	2	200 699 89
Zevener Volksbank eG	Zeven	Lower Saxony	GV	9	241 615 94
Aachener Bank eG	Aachen	North Rhine-Westphalia	RWGV	7	390 601 80
Raiffeisenbank Aldenhoven eG	Aldenhoven	North Rhine-Westphalia	RWGV	3	370 691 03
Volksbank Niederrhein eG	Alpen	North Rhine-Westphalia	RWGV	21	354 611 06
Spar- und Darlehnskasse Hoengen eG	Alsdorf	North Rhine-Westphalia	RWGV	3	370 693 55
Volksbank Anröchte eG	Anröchte	North Rhine-Westphalia	RWGV	5	416 612 06
Spar- und Darlehnskasse Oeventrop eG	Arnsberg	North Rhine-Westphalia	RWGV	3	464 622 71
Volksbank Sauerland eG	Arnsberg	North Rhine-Westphalia	RWGV	30	466 600 22
Volksbank Ascheberg-Herbern eG	Ascheberg	North Rhine-Westphalia	RWGV	3	400 696 01
Volksbank Wittgenstein eG	Bad Berleburg	North Rhine-Westphalia	RWGV	7	460 634 05
Spar- und Darlehnskasse Aegidienberg eG	Bad Honnef	North Rhine-Westphalia	RWGV	1	370 691 01
Volksbank Bad Salzuflen eG	Bad Salzuflen	North Rhine-Westphalia	RWGV	17	482 914 90
Volksbank Beckum eG	Beckum	North Rhine-Westphalia	RWGV	11	412 600 06
Bensberger Bank eG	Bergisch Gladbach	North Rhine-Westphalia	RWGV	4	370 621 24
VR-Bank Bergisch Gladbach-Overath-Rösrath eG	Bergisch Gladbach	North Rhine-Westphalia	RWGV	19	370 626 00
Bielefelder Volksbank eG	Bielefeld	North Rhine-Westphalia	RWGV	25	480 600 36
Volksbank Baumberge eG	Billerbeck	North Rhine-Westphalia	RWGV	6	400 694 08
Volksbank Ostlippe eG	Blomberg	North Rhine-Westphalia	RWGV	2	476 912 00
Volksbank Bocholt eG	Bocholt	North Rhine-Westphalia	RWGV	13	428 600 03
Volksbank Bochum Witten eG	Bochum	North Rhine-Westphalia	RWGV	24	430 601 29
GLS Gemeinschaftsbank eG	Bochum	North Rhine-Westphalia	RWGV	7	430 609 67
Volksbank Bönen eG	Bönen	North Rhine-Westphalia	RWGV	4	410 622 15
Volksbank Bonn Rhein-Sieg eG	Bonn	North Rhine-Westphalia	RWGV	31	380 601 86
VR-Bank Bonn eG	Bonn	North Rhine-Westphalia	RWGV	12	381 602 20
Volksbank Gemen eG	Borken	North Rhine-Westphalia	RWGV	1	428 615 15
Volksbank Kirchhellen eG	Bottrop	North Rhine-Westphalia	RWGV	7	424 614 35
Volksbank Bad Driburg-Brakel-Steinheim eG	Brakel	North Rhine-Westphalia	RWGV	17 (+ 3 SB)	472 643 67
Volksbank Thülen eG	Brilon	North Rhine-Westphalia	RWGV	1	400 693 71
Volksbank Brilon eG	Brilon	North Rhine-Westphalia	RWGV	12	416 617 19
Brühler Kreditbank eG	Brühl	North Rhine-Westphalia	RWGV	5	370 699 91
VR-Bank Rhein-Erft eG	Brühl	North Rhine-Westphalia	RWGV	20	371 612 89
Volksbank Wewelsburg-Ahden eG	Büren (Westfalen)	North Rhine-Westphalia	RWGV	2	472 653 83
VR-Bank Westmünsterland eG	Coesfeld	North Rhine-Westphalia	RWGV	35	428 613 87
Volksbank Lette-Darup-Rorup eG	Coesfeld-Lette	North Rhine-Westphalia	RWGV	3	400 692 26
Volksbank Westenholz eG	Delbrück	North Rhine-Westphalia	RWGV	1	472 626 26
Volksbank Delbrück-Hövelhof eG	Delbrück	North Rhine-Westphalia	RWGV	7	472 627 03
Volksbank Westerloh-Westerwiehe eG	Delbrück	North Rhine-Westphalia	RWGV	4	472 634 72
Volksbank Dinslaken eG	Dinslaken	North Rhine-Westphalia	RWGV	5	352 612 48
VR Bank Dormagen eG	Dormagen	North Rhine-Westphalia	RWGV	18	305 605 48
Volksbank Lembeck-Rhade eG	Dorsten	North Rhine-Westphalia	RWGV	2	400 697 09
Volksbank Dorsten eG	Dorsten	North Rhine-Westphalia	RWGV	8	426 623 20
KD-Bank eG - die Bank für Kirche und Diakonie	Dortmund	North Rhine-Westphalia	RWGV	5	350 601 90
Volksbank Dortmund-Nordwest eG	Dortmund	North Rhine-Westphalia	RWGV	14	440 601 22
Dortmunder Volksbank eG	Dortmund	North Rhine-Westphalia	RWGV	61	441 600 14
Volksbank Düren eG	Düren	North Rhine-Westphalia	RWGV	14	395 602 01
Deutsche Apotheker- und Ärztebank eG	Düsseldorf	North Rhine-Westphalia	RWGV	54	300 606 01
Volksbank Düsseldorf Neuss eG	Düsseldorf	North Rhine-Westphalia	RWGV	24	301 602 13
Volksbank Rhein-Ruhr eG	Duisburg	North Rhine-Westphalia	RWGV	24	350 603 86
Volksbank Erft eG	Elsdorf	North Rhine-Westphalia	RWGV	17	370 692 52
Volksbank Emmerich-Rees eG	Emmerich am Rhein	North Rhine-Westphalia	RWGV	12	358 602 45
Volksbank Enger-Spenge eG	Enger	North Rhine-Westphalia	RWGV	7	494 613 23
Volksbank Enniger-Ostenfelde-Westkirchen eG	Ennigerloh	North Rhine-Westphalia	RWGV	3	412 613 24
Volksbank Oelde-Ennigerloh-Neubeckum eG	Ennigerloh	North Rhine-Westphalia	RWGV	8	412 614 19
Raiffeisenbank Gymnich eG	Erftstadt	North Rhine-Westphalia	RWGV	2	370 693 22
Volksbank Erkelenz-Hückelhoven-Wegberg eG	Erkelenz	North Rhine-Westphalia	RWGV	20	312 612 82
Raiffeisenbank Erkelenz eG	Erkelenz	North Rhine-Westphalia	RWGV	14	312 633 59
Raiffeisen-Bank Eschweiler eG	Eschweiler	North Rhine-Westphalia	RWGV	7	393 622 54
Volksbank Reiste-Eslohe eG	Eslohe	North Rhine-Westphalia	RWGV	11	464 644 53
Bank im Bistum Essen eG	Essen	North Rhine-Westphalia	RWGV	1	360 602 95
Geno Bank Essen eG	Essen	North Rhine-Westphalia	RWGV	13	360 604 88
Volksbank Euskirchen eG	Euskirchen	North Rhine-Westphalia	RWGV	15	382 600 82
VR-Bank Freudenberg-Niederfischbach eG	Freudenberg	North Rhine-Westphalia	RWGV	5	460 617 24
Volksbank Randerath-Immendorf eG	Geilenkirchen	North Rhine-Westphalia	RWGV	3	370 693 81
Volksbank Gelsenkirchen-Buer eG	Gelsenkirchen	North Rhine-Westphalia	RWGV	41	422 600 01
Volksbank Gescher eG	Gescher	North Rhine-Westphalia	RWGV	2	401 649 01
Volksbank Störmede eG	Geseke	North Rhine-Westphalia	RWGV	2	416 624 65
Volksbank Greven eG	Greven	North Rhine-Westphalia	RWGV	6	400 612 38
Raiffeisenbank Grevenbroich eG	Grevenbroich	North Rhine-Westphalia	RWGV	15	370 693 06
Volksbank Gronau-Ahaus eG	Gronau	North Rhine-Westphalia	RWGV	21 (+ 3 SB)	401 640 24
Volksbank Bielefeld-Gütersloh eG	Gütersloh	North Rhine-Westphalia	RWGV	27	478 601 25
Märkische Bank eG	Hagen	North Rhine-Westphalia	RWGV	28	450 600 09
Volksbank Hohenlimburg eG	Hagen	North Rhine-Westphalia	RWGV	5	450 615 24
Volksbank Halle/Westf. eG	Halle (Westf.)	North Rhine-Westphalia	RWGV	8	480 620 51
Volksbank Haltern eG	Haltern am See	North Rhine-Westphalia	RWGV	7	426 613 30
Volksbank Hamm eG	Hamm	North Rhine-Westphalia	RWGV	16	410 601 20
Spar- und Darlehnskasse Bockum-Hövel eG	Hamm	North Rhine-Westphalia	RWGV	8	410 610 11
BAG Bankaktiengesellschaft	Hamm	North Rhine-Westphalia	RWGV	6	410 619 03
Volksbank Harsewinkel eG	Harsewinkel	North Rhine-Westphalia	RWGV	4	478 615 18
Volksbank Heiden eG	Heiden	North Rhine-Westphalia	RWGV	1	428 616 08
Volksbank Heimbach eG	Heimbach	North Rhine-Westphalia	RWGV	1	370 693 42
Raiffeisenbank Heinsberg eG	Heinsberg	North Rhine-Westphalia	RWGV	26	370 694 12
Heinsberger Volksbank AG	Heinsberg	North Rhine-Westphalia	RWGV	1	390 619 81
Volksbank Bad Oeynhausen-Herford eG	Herford	North Rhine-Westphalia	RWGV	28	494 900 70
Volksbank Clarholz-Lette-Beelen eG	Herzebrock	North Rhine-Westphalia	RWGV	3	478 613 17
Volksbank Hörstel eG	Hörstel	North Rhine-Westphalia	RWGV	3	403 634 33
Spar- und Darlehnskasse Brachelen eG	Hückelhoven	North Rhine-Westphalia	RWGV	2	370 691 53
Volksbank Schnathorst eG	Hüllhorst	North Rhine-Westphalia	RWGV	5	492 623 64
Raiffeisenbank Frechen-Hürth eG	Hürth	North Rhine-Westphalia	RWGV	27	370 623 65
Raiffeisenbank Fischenich-Kendenich eG	Hürth	North Rhine-Westphalia	RWGV	2	370 633 67
Volksbank Tecklenburger Land eG	Ibbenbüren	North Rhine-Westphalia	RWGV	23	403 619 06
Raiffeisenbank Kaarst eG	Kaarst	North Rhine-Westphalia	RWGV	5	370 694 05
Volksbank Kamen-Werne eG	Kamen	North Rhine-Westphalia	RWGV	7	443 613 42
Volksbank Kempen-Grefrath eG	Kempen	North Rhine-Westphalia	RWGV	4	320 614 14
Raiffeisenbank von 1895 eG	Kerpen	North Rhine-Westphalia	RWGV	5	370 693 31
Volksbank an der Niers eG	Kevelaer	North Rhine-Westphalia	RWGV	28	320 613 84
Volksbank Kierspe eG	Kierspe	North Rhine-Westphalia	RWGV	4	458 614 34
Volksbank Kleverland eG	Kleve	North Rhine-Westphalia	RWGV	14	324 604 22
Bank für Sozialwirtschaft AG	Köln	North Rhine-Westphalia	RWGV	15	370 205 00
Pax-Bank eG	Köln	North Rhine-Westphalia	RWGV	9	370 601 93
Raiffeisenbank Junkersdorf eG	Köln	North Rhine-Westphalia	RWGV	1	370 694 01
Volksbank Dünnwald-Holweide eG	Köln	North Rhine-Westphalia	RWGV	4	370 694 27
Kölner Bank eG	Köln	North Rhine-Westphalia	RWGV	36	371 600 87
Volksbank Krefeld eG	Krefeld	North Rhine-Westphalia	RWGV	14	320 603 62
Raiffeisenbank Kürten-Odenthal eG	Kürten	North Rhine-Westphalia	RWGV	7	370 691 25
Volksbank Laer-Horstmar-Leer eG	Laer	North Rhine-Westphalia	RWGV	3	401 642 56
Volksbank Grevenbrück eG	Lennestadt	North Rhine-Westphalia	RWGV	12	462 616 07
Volksbank Rhein-Wupper eG	Leverkusen	North Rhine-Westphalia	RWGV	10	375 600 92
Volksbank Lippstadt eG	Lippstadt	North Rhine-Westphalia	RWGV	9	416 601 24
Volksbank Benninghausen eG	Lippstadt	North Rhine-Westphalia	RWGV	2	416 615 04
Volksbank Hörste eG	Lippstadt	North Rhine-Westphalia	RWGV	1	416 633 35
Volksbank Lübbecker Land eG	Lübbecke	North Rhine-Westphalia	RWGV	22	490 926 50
Volksbank Lüdenscheid eG	Lüdenscheid	North Rhine-Westphalia	RWGV	7	458 600 33
Volksbank Seppenrade eG	Lüdinghausen	North Rhine-Westphalia	RWGV	1	400 696 22
Volksbank Lüdinghausen-Olfen eG	Lüdinghausen	North Rhine-Westphalia	RWGV	6	401 645 28
Volksbank Marl-Recklinghausen eG	Marl	North Rhine-Westphalia	RWGV	18	426 610 08
Volksbank Marsberg eG	Marsberg	North Rhine-Westphalia	RWGV	7	400 692 66
Volksbank Medebach eG	Medebach	North Rhine-Westphalia	RWGV	2	400 693 48
Volksbank Meerbusch eG	Meerbusch	North Rhine-Westphalia	RWGV	5	370 691 64
Volksbank Meinerzhagen eG	Meinerzhagen	North Rhine-Westphalia	RWGV	4	458 616 17
Mendener Bank eG	Menden	North Rhine-Westphalia	RWGV	4	447 613 12
Volksbank Minden-Hille-Porta eG	Minden	North Rhine-Westphalia	RWGV	26	490 601 27
Volksbank Minden eG	Minden	North Rhine-Westphalia	RWGV	6	490 603 92
Gladbacher Bank AG von 1922	Mönchengladbach	North Rhine-Westphalia	RWGV	6	310 601 81
Volksbank Mönchengladbach eG	Mönchengladbach	North Rhine-Westphalia	RWGV	18	310 605 17
Raiffeisenbank Rhein-Berg eG	Monheim am Rhein	North Rhine-Westphalia	RWGV	13	370 695 21
DKM Darlehnskasse Münster eG	Münster	North Rhine-Westphalia	RWGV	1	400 602 65
Volksbank Münster eG	Münster	North Rhine-Westphalia	RWGV	20	401 600 50
Volksbank Amelsbüren eG	Münster-Amelsbüren	North Rhine-Westphalia	RWGV	1	400 696 00
Volksbank Sprakel eG	Münster-Sprakel	North Rhine-Westphalia	RWGV	1	400 694 62
Volksbank Brüggen-Nettetal eG	Nettetal	North Rhine-Westphalia	RWGV	9	310 621 54
Volksbank Schwalmtal eG	Niederkrüchten	North Rhine-Westphalia	RWGV	2	310 625 53
Volksbank Südkirchen-Capelle-Nordkirchen eG	Nordkirchen	North Rhine-Westphalia	RWGV	3	400 697 16
Volksbank Nottuln eG	Nottuln	North Rhine-Westphalia	RWGV	4	401 643 52
Volksbank Ochtrup eG	Ochtrup	North Rhine-Westphalia	RWGV	5	401 646 18
Volksbank Olpe eG	Olpe	North Rhine-Westphalia	RWGV	3	462 600 23
Volksbank Paderborn-Höxter-Detmold eG	Paderborn	North Rhine-Westphalia	RWGV	67 (+ 16 SB)	472 601 21
Volksbank Elsen-Wewer-Borchen eG	Paderborn	North Rhine-Westphalia	RWGV	6	472 602 34
Bank für Kirche und Caritas eG	Paderborn	North Rhine-Westphalia	RWGV	1	472 603 07
Volksbank Petershagen eG	Petershagen	North Rhine-Westphalia	RWGV	11	490 632 96
Volksbank Eisbergen eG	Porta Westfalica	North Rhine-Westphalia	RWGV	2	490 615 10
Volksbank Erle eG	Raesfeld	North Rhine-Westphalia	RWGV	1	400 696 06
Volksbank Raesfeld eG	Raesfeld	North Rhine-Westphalia	RWGV	1	428 624 51
Spar- und Darlehnskasse Reken eG	Reken	North Rhine-Westphalia	RWGV	4	428 612 39
Volksbank Remscheid-Solingen eG	Remscheid	North Rhine-Westphalia	RWGV	17	340 600 94
Volksbank Rhede eG	Rhede	North Rhine-Westphalia	RWGV	3	428 618 14
Raiffeisenbank Rheinbach Voreifel eG	Rheinbach	North Rhine-Westphalia	RWGV	13	370 696 27
Volksbank Nordmünsterland eG	Rheine	North Rhine-Westphalia	RWGV	21	401 637 20
Volksbank Rietberg eG	Rietberg	North Rhine-Westphalia	RWGV	6	478 624 47
Raiffeisenbank Much-Ruppichteroth eG	Ruppichteroth	North Rhine-Westphalia	RWGV	5	370 695 24
Volksbank Saerbeck eG	Saerbeck	North Rhine-Westphalia	RWGV	1	400 693 62
Volksbank Büren und Salzkotten eG	Salzkotten	North Rhine-Westphalia	RWGV	23	472 616 03
Raiffeisenbank Sankt Augustin eG	Sankt Augustin	North Rhine-Westphalia	RWGV	5	370 697 07
Volksbank Schermbeck eG	Schermbeck	North Rhine-Westphalia	RWGV	4	400 693 63
Volksbank Schlangen eG	Schlangen	North Rhine-Westphalia	RWGV	4	400 692 83
VR-Bank Nordeifel eG	Schleiden	North Rhine-Westphalia	RWGV	15	370 697 20
Spar- und Darlehnskasse Schloß Holte-Stukenbrock eG	Schloß Holte-Stukenbrock	North Rhine-Westphalia	RWGV	4	480 624 66
Volksbank Bigge-Lenne eG	Schmallenberg	North Rhine-Westphalia	RWGV	28	460 628 17
Volksbank Selm-Bork eG	Selm	North Rhine-Westphalia	RWGV	7	401 653 66
Volksbank Senden eG	Senden	North Rhine-Westphalia	RWGV	2	400 695 46
VR-Bank Rhein-Sieg eG	Siegburg	North Rhine-Westphalia	RWGV	23	370 695 20
Volksbank Siegerland eG	Siegen	North Rhine-Westphalia	RWGV	30	460 600 40
Raiffeisenbank Simmerath eG	Simmerath	North Rhine-Westphalia	RWGV	8	370 696 42
Volksbank Hellweg eG	Soest	North Rhine-Westphalia	RWGV	24	414 601 16
Volksbank Sprockhövel eG	Sprockhövel	North Rhine-Westphalia	RWGV	6	452 615 47
Vereinigte Volksbank Telgte eG	Telgte	North Rhine-Westphalia	RWGV	10	412 626 21
Volksbank Kaunitz eG	Verl	North Rhine-Westphalia	RWGV	1	478 618 06
Volksbank Versmold eG	Versmold	North Rhine-Westphalia	RWGV	3	478 633 73
Volksbank Viersen eG	Viersen	North Rhine-Westphalia	RWGV	6	314 602 90
Volksbank Wachtberg eG	Wachtberg	North Rhine-Westphalia	RWGV	4	370 698 05
Volksbank Haaren eG	Waldfeucht	North Rhine-Westphalia	RWGV	2	370 693 30
Volksbank Waltrop eG	Waltrop	North Rhine-Westphalia	RWGV	15	426 617 17
Volksbank Warburger Land eG	Warburg	North Rhine-Westphalia	RWGV	14	474 600 28
Volksbank Ahlen-Sassenberg-Warendorf eG	Warendorf	North Rhine-Westphalia	RWGV	10	412 625 01
Volksbank Wenden-Drolshagen eG	Wenden	North Rhine-Westphalia	RWGV	10	462 618 22
Volksbank im Märkischen Kreis eG	Werdohl	North Rhine-Westphalia	RWGV	16	447 615 34
Volksbank Rhein-Lippe eG	Wesel	North Rhine-Westphalia	RWGV	20	356 605 99
Volksbank Westerkappeln-Wersen eG	Westerkappeln	North Rhine-Westphalia	RWGV	2	403 616 27
Volksbank Wickede (Ruhr) eG	Wickede (Ruhr)	North Rhine-Westphalia	RWGV	2	414 622 95
Volksbank Oberberg eG	Wiehl	North Rhine-Westphalia	RWGV	27	384 621 35
Rosbacher Raiffeisenbank eG	Windeck	North Rhine-Westphalia	RWGV	1	370 696 39
Volksbank Wipperfürth-Lindlar eG	Wipperfürth	North Rhine-Westphalia	RWGV	8	370 698 40
Spar- und Kreditbank des Bundes Freier evangelischer Gemeinden eG	Witten	North Rhine-Westphalia	RWGV	1	452 604 75
VR-Bank Würselen eG	Würselen	North Rhine-Westphalia	RWGV	30	391 629 80
Credit- und Volksbank Wuppertal eG	Wuppertal	North Rhine-Westphalia	RWGV	11	330 600 98
Raiffeisenbank Alsheim-Gimbsheim eG	Alsheim	Rhineland-Palatinate	GV	2	553 612 02
Volksbank Alzey eG	Alzey	Rhineland-Palatinate	GV	26	550 912 00
Raiffeisenbank Unterwesterwald eG	Arzbach	Rhineland-Palatinate	GV	1	572 630 15
VR Bank Südliche Weinstraße eG	Bad Bergzabern	Rhineland-Palatinate	GV	19	548 913 00
VR Bank Mittelhaardt eG	Bad Dürkheim	Rhineland-Palatinate	GV	13	546 912 00
Volksbank Nahetal eG	Bad Kreuznach	Rhineland-Palatinate	GV	26 (+3 SB)	560 900 00
Volksbank RheinAhrEifel eG	Bad Neuenahr-Ahrweiler	Rhineland-Palatinate	GV	43	577 615 91
Volksbank Bechtheim eG	Bechtheim	Rhineland-Palatinate	GV	1	553 620 71
Volksbank Bitburg eG	Bitburg	Rhineland-Palatinate	RWGV	18	586 601 01
Volksbank Boppard eG	Boppard	Rhineland-Palatinate	GV	8	570 915 00
Raiffeisenbank Alzey-Land eG	Bornheim	Rhineland-Palatinate	GV	3	500 691 26
Raiffeisenbank Zeller Land eG	Briedel	Rhineland-Palatinate	RWGV	7	587 613 43
Budenheimer Volksbank eG	Budenheim	Rhineland-Palatinate	GV	1	550 613 03
Volksbank Daaden eG	Daaden	Rhineland-Palatinate	GV	5	573 912 00
Raiffeisen- und Volksbank Dahn eG	Dahn	Rhineland-Palatinate	GV	7	542 912 00
Volksbank Rhein-Lahn eG	Diez	Rhineland-Palatinate	GV	27	570 928 00
Raiffeisenbank östliche Südeifel eG	Dudeldorf	Rhineland-Palatinate	RWGV	12	586 626 53
Raiffeisenkasse Erbes-Büdesheim und Umgebung eG	Erbes-Büdesheim	Rhineland-Palatinate	GV	4	500 692 41
Raiffeisenbank Moselkrampen eG	Ernst	Rhineland-Palatinate	RWGV	7	570 690 81
Raiffeisenbank Nahe eG	Fischbach	Rhineland-Palatinate	RWGV	8	562 617 35
Raiffeisenbank Freinsheim eG	Freinsheim	Rhineland-Palatinate	GV	1	546 618 00
Raiffeisenbank Friedelsheim-Rödersheim eG	Friedelsheim	Rhineland-Palatinate	GV	1	546 632 70
Volksbank Gebhardshain eG	Gebhardshain	Rhineland-Palatinate	RWGV	5	573 614 76
Volksbank Glan-Münchweiler eG	Glan-Münchweiler	Rhineland-Palatinate	GV	12	540 924 00
Raiffeisenbank Grafschaft-Wachtberg eG	Grafschaft-Oeverich	Rhineland-Palatinate	RWGV	12	577 622 65
Westerwald Bank eG Volks- und Raiffeisenbank	Hachenburg	Rhineland-Palatinate	GV/RWGV	41	573 918 00
Volksbank Hamm/Sieg eG	Hamm (Sieg)	Rhineland-Palatinate	GV	3	573 915 00
Raiffeisenbank Herxheim eG	Herxheim bei Landau/Pfalz	Rhineland-Palatinate	GV	2	548 623 90
Volksbank-Raiffeisenbank Naheland eG	Idar-Oberstein	Rhineland-Palatinate	GV	19	562 900 00
Raiffeisenbank Irrel eG	Irrel	Rhineland-Palatinate	RWGV	3	570 697 27
Raiffeisenbank Kaisersesch-Kaifenheim eG	Kaisersesch	Rhineland-Palatinate	RWGV	11	570 691 44
Volksbank Kaiserslautern- Nordwestpfalz eG	Kaiserslautern	Rhineland-Palatinate	GV	29	540 900 00
Raiffeisenbank Kastellaun eG	Kastellaun	Rhineland-Palatinate	RWGV	8	560 611 51
Raiffeisenbank Kehrig eG	Kehrig	Rhineland-Palatinate	RWGV	2	576 612 53
Volksbank Koblenz Mittelrhein eG	Koblenz	Rhineland-Palatinate	GV/RWGV	18	570 900 00
RV Bank Rhein-Haardt eG	Lambsheim	Rhineland-Palatinate	GV	25	545 613 10
VR Bank Südpfalz eG	Landau in der Pfalz	Rhineland-Palatinate	GV	73	548 625 00
Vereinigte Genossenschafts- und Raiffeisenbank Westpfalz eG	Landstuhl	Rhineland-Palatinate	GV	26	540 616 50
Volksbank Lauterecken eG	Lauterecken	Rhineland-Palatinate	GV	21	540 917 00
Raiffeisenbank Mehring-Leiwen eG	Leiwen	Rhineland-Palatinate	RWGV	4	585 617 71
Raiffeisenbank Lutzerather Höhe eG	Lutzerath	Rhineland-Palatinate	RWGV	6	570 690 67
Genobank Mainz eG	Mombach	Rhineland-Palatinate	GV	1	550 606 11
Mainzer Volksbank eG	Mainz	Rhineland-Palatinate	GV	35	551 900 00
VR-Bank Mainz eG	Gonsenheim	Rhineland-Palatinate	GV	10	550 604 17
Volksbank Montabaur-Höhr-Grenzhausen eG	Montabaur	Rhineland-Palatinate	GV	9	570 910 00
VR-Bank Hunsrück-Mosel eG	Morbach	Rhineland-Palatinate	RWGV	14	570 698 06
Volksbank Mülheim-Kärlich eG	Mülheim	Rhineland-Palatinate	RWGV	3	570 642 21
Raiffeisenbank Neustadt eG	Neustadt (Wied)	Rhineland-Palatinate	RWGV	7	570 692 38
Volks- und Raiffeisenbank Neuwied-Linz eG	Neuwied	Rhineland-Palatinate	RWGV	20	574 601 17
Raiffeisenbank Niederwallmenach eG	Niederwallmenach	Rhineland-Palatinate	GV	5	570 626 75
VR Bank Rhein-Mosel eG	Ochtendung	Rhineland-Palatinate	RWGV	18	576 622 63
VR-Bank Pirmasens eG	Pirmasens	Rhineland-Palatinate	GV	12	542 900 00
Volksbank Eifel Mitte eG	Prüm	Rhineland-Palatinate	GV/RWGV	12	586 915 00
Volksbank Rheinböllen eG	Rheinböllen	Rhineland-Palatinate	RWGV	3	560 622 27
Volksbank Hochwald-Saarburg eG	Saarburg	Rhineland-Palatinate	RWGV	10	585 647 88
Raiffeisenbank Schifferstadt eG	Schifferstadt	Rhineland-Palatinate	GV	6	547 614 11
Raiffeisenbank Westeifel eG	Schönecken	Rhineland-Palatinate	RWGV	12	586 619 01
Raiffeisen-Volksbank Schwabenheim an der Selz eG	Schwabenheim an der Selz	Rhineland-Palatinate	GV		500 698 42
Volksbank Hunsrück eG	Simmern	Rhineland-Palatinate	RWGV	15	560 614 72
Volksbank Kur- und Rheinpfalz eG	Speyer	Rhineland-Palatinate	GV	36	547 900 00
Volksbank Trier eG	Trier	Rhineland-Palatinate	RWGV	23	585 601 03
Volksbank Vallendar-Niederwerth eG	Vallendar	Rhineland-Palatinate	RWGV	3	570 634 78
Vereinigte Raiffeisenkassen Weinsheim eG	Weinsheim	Rhineland-Palatinate	RWGV	7	560 625 77
Raiffeisenbank Mittelrhein eG	Weißenthurm	Rhineland-Palatinate	RWGV	7	574 617 59
Raiffeisenbank Welling eG	Welling	Rhineland-Palatinate	RWGV	1	570 693 61
Vereinigte Volksbank Raiffeisenbank Wittlich eG	Wittlich	Rhineland-Palatinate	RWGV	21 (+ 6 SB)	587 609 54
Volksbank Rheindürkheim eG	Worms	Rhineland-Palatinate	GV	1	553 607 84
Volksbank Worms-Wonnegau eG	Worms	Rhineland-Palatinate	GV	19	553 900 00
VR-Bank Südwestpfalz eG	Zweibrücken	Rhineland-Palatinate	GV	17	542 617 00
Volksbank Dillingen eG	Dillingen	Saarland	GV	12	593 920 00
Raiffeisenbank Wiesbach eG	Eppelborn	Saarland	GV	1	590 995 30
Volksbank Saarpfalz eG	Homburg	Saarland	GV	17	592 912 00
VR Bank Saarpfalz eG	Homburg	Saarland	GV	19	594 913 00
levo Bank Vereinte Volksbanken Lebach Eppelborn eG	Lebach	Saarland	GV	13	593 930 00
Volksbank Untere Saar eG	Losheim am See	Saarland	GV	20	593 922 00
Volksbank Nahe-Schaumberg eG	Nohfelden	Saarland	GV	9	590 995 50
Volksbank Dudweiler eG	Saarbrücken	Saarland	GV	33	590 920 00
Bank1Saar eG	Saarbrücken	Saarland	GV	66	591 900 00
Volksbank Saar-West eG	Saarlouis	Saarland	GV	13	591 902 00
Volksbank Saarlouis eG	Saarlouis	Saarland	GV	14	593 901 00
St. Wendeler Volksbank eG	St. Wendel	Saarland	GV	16	592 910 00
Volksbank Überherrn eG	Überherrn	Saarland	GV	3	593 912 00
Volksbank Erzgebirge eG	Annaberg-Buchholz	Saxony	GV	16	870 960 34
Volksbank Bautzen eG	Bautzen	Saxony	GV	23	855 900 00
VR Bank Leipziger Land eG	Borna	Saxony	GV	18	860 654 48
Vereinigte Raiffeisenbank Burgstädt eG	Burgstädt	Saxony	GV	11	870 690 77
Volksbank Chemnitz eG	Chemnitz	Saxony	GV	22	870 962 14
Volksbank Delitzsch eG	Delitzsch	Saxony	GV	10	860 955 54
Volksbank-Raiffeisenbank Döbeln eG	Döbeln	Saxony	GV	11	860 654 68
Dresdner Volksbank Raiffeisenbank eG	Dresden	Saxony	GV	27	850 900 00
Landeskirchliche Kredit- Genossenschaft Sachsen eG	Dresden	Saxony	GV	1	850 951 64
Freiberger Bank eG Volks- und Raiffeisenbank	Freiberg (Sachsen)	Saxony	GV	11	870 960 74
Volksbank-Raiffeisenbank Glauchau eG	Glauchau	Saxony	GVB	9	870 959 74
Volksbank Raiffeisenbank Niederschlesien eG	Görlitz	Saxony	GV	22	855 910 00
Raiffeisenbank Grimma eG	Grimma	Saxony	GV	8	860 654 83
Volks- und Raiffeisenbank Muldental eG	Grimma	Saxony	GV	9	860 954 84
Volksbank Leipzig eG	Leipzig	Saxony	GV	7	860 956 04
Volksbank Raiffeisenbank Meißen Großenhain eG	Meißen	Saxony	GV	16	850 950 04
Volksbank Mittweida eG	Mittweida	Saxony	GV	10	870 961 24
Volksbank Löbau-Zittau eG	Neugersdorf	Saxony	GV	16	855 901 00
Volksbank Mittleres Erzgebirge eG	Olbernhau	Saxony	GV	15	870 690 75
Volksbank Pirna eG	Pirna	Saxony	GV	7	850 600 00
Volksbank Vogtland eG	Plauen	Saxony	GV	15	870 958 24
Volksbank Riesa eG	Riesa	Saxony	GV	15	850 949 84
Raiffeisenbank Neustadt (Sachs.) eG	Sebnitz	Saxony	GV	5	850 650 28
Raiffeisenbank Torgau eG	Torgau	Saxony	GV	9	860 690 70
Volksbank Zwickau eG	Zwickau	Saxony	GVB	6	870 959 34
Volksbank Jerichower Land eG	Burg	Saxony-Anhalt	GV	9	810 632 38
Volksbank Dessau-Anhalt eG	Dessau	Saxony-Anhalt	GV	19	800 935 74
Volksbank Gardelegen eG	Gardelegen	Saxony-Anhalt	GV		810 930 34
Volksbank Halle (Saale) eG	Halle	Saxony-Anhalt	GV	36	800 937 84
Volksbank Elsterland eG	Jessen	Saxony-Anhalt	GV	12	800 626 08
Raiffeisenbank Kalbe-Bismark eG	Kalbe	Saxony-Anhalt	GV	7	810 630 28
Volksbank Köthen-Bitterfeld eG	Köthen	Saxony-Anhalt	GV	8	800 636 28
Volks- und Raiffeisenbank Eisleben eG	Lutherstadt Eisleben	Saxony-Anhalt	GV	5	800 637 18
Volksbank Wittenberg eG	Lutherstadt Wittenberg	Saxony-Anhalt	GV	7 (+ 6 SB)	800 635 98
Volksbank Magdeburg eG	Magdeburg	Saxony-Anhalt	GV	9	810 932 74
Volks- und Raiffeisenbank Saale-Unstrut eG	Merseburg	Saxony-Anhalt	GV	15	800 636 48
Ostharzer Volksbank eG	Quedlinburg	Saxony-Anhalt	GV	14	800 635 08
Volksbank Sangerhausen eG	Sangerhausen	Saxony-Anhalt	GV	6	800 635 58
Volksbank Stendal eG	Stendal	Saxony-Anhalt	GV	11	810 930 54
Volksbank Börde-Bernburg eG	Wanzleben	Saxony-Anhalt	GV	15	810 690 52
Vereinigte Volksbank Wernigerode eG	Wernigerode	Saxony-Anhalt	GV	17	278 932 15
Volks- und Raiffeisenbank Zeitz eG	Zeitz	Saxony-Anhalt	GV	6	800 636 78
Raiffeisenbank Südstormarn eG	Ahrensburg	Schleswig-Holstein	GV	8	200 691 77
Raiffeisenbank Bad Bramstedt eG	Bad Bramstedt	Schleswig-Holstein	GV	13	200 691 30
Volksbank Stormarn eG	Bad Oldesloe	Schleswig-Holstein	GV	14	201 901 09
Raiffeisenbank Bargteheide eG	Bargteheide	Schleswig-Holstein	GV	3	230 621 24
Eckernförder Bank eG Volksbank - Raiffeisenbank	Eckernförde	Schleswig-Holstein	GV	18	210 920 23
Volksbank Elmshorn eG	Elmshorn	Schleswig-Holstein	GV	8	221 900 30
Volksbank Eutin Raiffeisenbank eG	Eutin	Schleswig-Holstein	GV	12	213 922 18
Raiffeisenbank Handewitt eG	Handewitt	Schleswig-Holstein	GV	6	215 653 16
Raiffeisenbank Heide eG	Heide	Schleswig-Holstein	GV	7	218 604 18
Dithmarscher Volks- und Raiffeisenbank eG	Heide	Schleswig-Holstein	GV	15	218 900 22
Raiffeisenbank Elbmarsch eG	Heist	Schleswig-Holstein	GV	4	221 631 14
Volksbank-Raiffeisenbank Husum-Eiderstedt-Viöl eG	Husum	Schleswig-Holstein	GV	17	217 625 50
Volksbank Raiffeisenbank Itzehoe eG	Itzehoe	Schleswig-Holstein	GV	30	222 900 31
Raiffeisenbank Kaltenkirchen eG	Kaltenkirchen	Schleswig-Holstein	GV		200 691 25
Evangelische Darlehnsgenossenschaft Kiel eG	Kiel	Schleswig-Holstein	GV	2	210 602 37
Kieler Volksbank eG	Kiel	Schleswig-Holstein	GV	22	210 900 07
Raiffeisenbank Lauenburg eG	Lauenburg	Schleswig-Holstein	GV	7	230 631 29
Raiffeisenbank Leezen eG	Leezen	Schleswig-Holstein	GV	10	230 612 20
Volksbank Ostholstein Nord eG	Lensahn	Schleswig-Holstein	GV	12	213 900 08
Volksbank Lübeck – Landbank von 1902 eG	Lübeck	Schleswig-Holstein	GV	10	230 901 42
Raiffeisenbank Travemünde eG	Lübeck-Travemünde	Schleswig-Holstein	GV	1	200 698 82
Raiffeisenbank im Kreis Plön eG	Lütjenburg	Schleswig-Holstein	GV	10	210 640 45
Volks- und Raiffeisenbank Mölln eG	Mölln	Schleswig-Holstein	GV	8	230 628 07
VR-Bank Neumünster eG	Neumünster	Schleswig-Holstein	GV	22	212 900 16
VR-Bank Niebüll eG	Niebüll	Schleswig-Holstein	GV	13	217 635 42
Norderstedter Bank eG	Norderstedt	Schleswig-Holstein	GV	5	200 691 11
Volksbank-Raiffeisenbank im Kreis Rendsburg eG	Osterrönfeld	Schleswig-Holstein	GV	17	214 636 03
Raiffeisenbank Owschlag eG	Owschlag	Schleswig-Holstein	GV	2	200 696 41
VR-Bank Pinneberg eG	Pinneberg	Schleswig-Holstein	GV	20	221 914 05
Raiffeisenbank Ratzeburg eG	Ratzeburg	Schleswig-Holstein	GV	5	200 698 61
VR Bank Flensburg-Schleswig eG	Schleswig	Schleswig-Holstein	GV	14 + 3 SB-Stellen	216 617 19
Schleswiger Volksbank eG	Schleswig	Schleswig-Holstein	GV	12	216 900 20
Raiffeisenbank Seestermühe eG	Seestermühe	Schleswig-Holstein	GV	2	200 691 44
Raiffeisenbank Struvenhütten eG	Struvenhütten	Schleswig-Holstein	GV	1	200 692 32
Volks- und Raiffeisenbank Süderbrarup eG	Süderbrarup	Schleswig-Holstein	GV	8	215 663 56
Raiffeisenbank Todenbüttel eG	Todenbüttel	Schleswig-Holstein	GV	2	214 646 71
Sylter Bank eG	Westerland	Schleswig-Holstein	GV	3	217 918 05
Föhr-Amrumer Bank eG	Wyk auf Föhr	Schleswig-Holstein	GV	5	217 919 06
VR-Bank Bad Salzungen Schmalkalden eG	Bad Salzungen	Thuringia	GV	18 (+ 5 SB)	840 947 54
Volksbank und Raiffeisenbank Eisenach eG	Eisenach	Thuringia	GV	11	820 640 88
Volksbank Eisenberg eG	Eisenberg	Thuringia	GV	5	830 944 94
Erfurter Bank eG	Erfurt	Thuringia	GV	12	820 642 28
Geraer Bank eG	Gera	Thuringia	GV	12	830 645 68
Raiffeisenbank Gotha eG	Gotha	Thuringia	GV	8	820 641 68
Volksbank Heiligenstadt eG	Heilbad Heiligenstadt	Thuringia	GV	5	820 940 04
Raiffeisen-Volksbank Hermsdorfer Kreuz eG	Hermsdorf	Thuringia	GVB	6	830 644 88
VR Bank Westthüringen eG	Mühlhausen/Thüringen	Thuringia	GV	21	820 640 38
Nordthüringer Volksbank eG	Nordhausen	Thuringia	GV	33	820 940 54
Raiffeisen-Volksbank Saale-Orla eG	Pößneck	Thuringia	GV	13	830 944 44
Volksbank Saaletal eG	Rudolstadt	Thuringia	GV	34	830 944 54
Raiffeisenbank Schleusingen eG	Schleusingen	Thuringia	GV	8	840 690 65
VR-Bank Altenburger Land eG	Schmölln	Thuringia	GV	11	830 654 08
VR-Bank Südthüringen eG	Suhl	Thuringia	GV	13	840 948 14
VR Bank Weimar eG	Weimar	Thuringia	GV	15	820 641 88

== Sparda-Bank ==
- Sparda-Bank Augsburg eG, Augsburg
- Sparda-Bank Baden-Württemberg eG, Stuttgart
- Sparda-Bank Berlin eG, Berlin
- Sparda-Bank Hamburg eG, Hamburg
- Sparda-Bank Hannover eG, Hannover
- Sparda-Bank Hessen eG, Frankfurt am Main
- Sparda-Bank München eG, München
- Sparda-Bank Nürnberg eG, Nürnberg
- Sparda-Bank Regensburg eG, Regensburg
- Sparda-Bank Südwest eG, Mainz
- Sparda-Bank West eG, Düsseldorf

== PSD Bank ==
- PSD Bank Berlin-Brandenburg eG, Berlin
- PSD Bank Braunschweig eG, Braunschweig
- PSD Bank Hannover eG, Hannover
- PSD Bank Hessen-Thüringen eG, Eschborn
- PSD Bank Karlsruhe-Neustadt eG, Karlsruhe
- PSD Bank Kiel eG, Kiel
- PSD Bank Koblenz eG, Koblenz
- PSD Bank West eG, Köln
- PSD Bank München eG, Augsburg
- PSD Bank Nord eG, Hamburg
- PSD Bank Nürnberg eG, Nürnberg
- PSD Bank RheinNeckarSaar eG, Stuttgart
- PSD Bank Rhein-Ruhr eG, Düsseldorf
- PSD Bank Westfalen-Lippe eG, Münster (Westf.),
