= PSD Bank München =

Coordinates: 48.37696°N 10.88423°E

- Company type: Cooperative
- Industry: Direct bank
- Headquarters: Augsburg, Germany
- Products: construction financing; installment loans; investment products; giro
- Total assets: €2.066 million (2018)
- Members: 34,446 (2018)
- Number of employees: 133 (2018)
- Website: www.psd-muenchen.de

The PSD Bank München which has its headquarters in Augsburg, Germany, is a regional operating direct bank for private customers, who are part of the PSD Banking Group. The bank is a member of the Bundesverband der Deutschen Volksbanken und Raiffeisenbanken (BVR), together with 13 other independent PSD banks. Its business area expands across Swabia, Upper Bavaria and Lower Bavaria, where the bank serves about 85,000 private customers. The PSD is among Munichs biggest cooperative banks, with total assets of over 2 billion Euro. Its legal supervision is carried out by the Federal Financial Supervisory Authority.

== Services ==
The bank offers financial services to private customers in the areas construction financing, installment loans, investment products and giro. The areas property agency, building society savings, insurances and stocks are being covered through cooperation's with the Bausparkasse Schwäbisch Hall, the DeTeAssekuranz, Franklin Templeton Investments as well as the Union Investment. The bank is a member of the Bankcard-Servicenetz. The PSD Bank Munich offers customer service in Augsburg and Munich.

== Social and sponsoring activities ==
In the business area of the PSD Bank München a number of projects from the spheres of sport, education, social and environment receive annual support. In 2016 charitable organizations and associations from the region were supported with 199,000 Euro.
