= Tiefenbach, Passau =

Tiefenbach
- Municipality
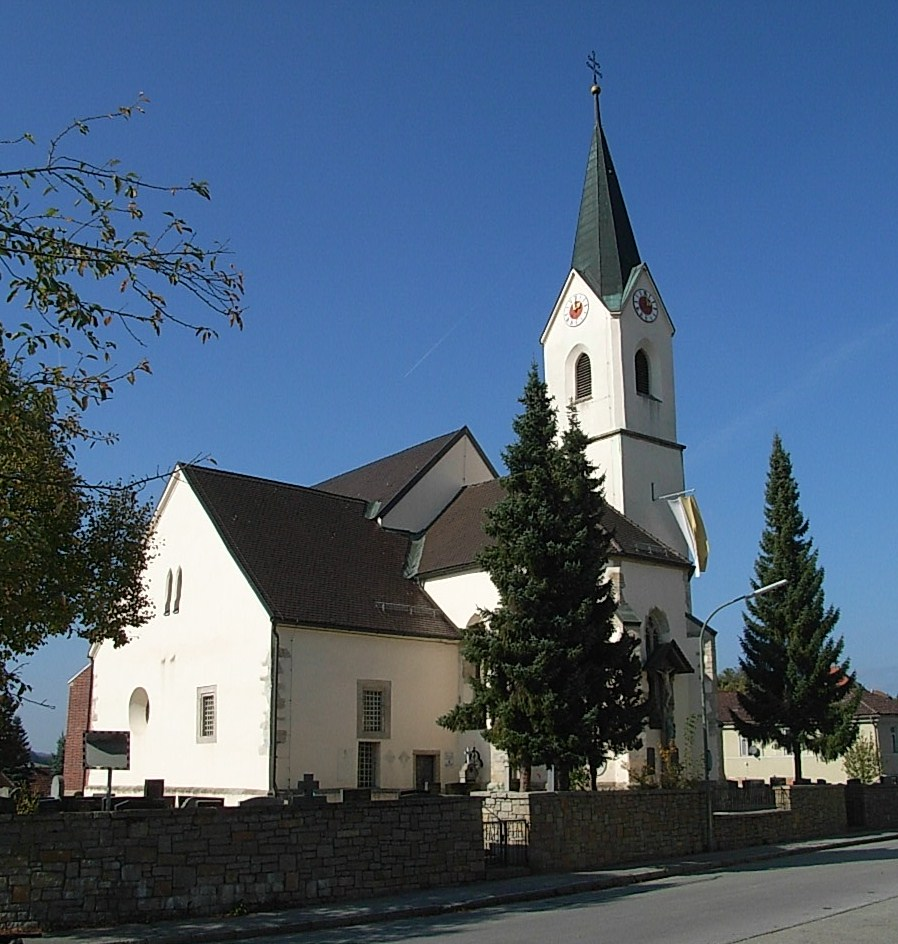
- Parish church of Saint Margaret

- Coat of arms

- Location of Tiefenbach within Passau district
- Interactive map of Tiefenbach
- Location within Germany Location within Bavaria
- Coordinates: 48°37′N 13°24′E
- Country: Germany
- State: Bavaria
- Admin. region: Niederbayern
- District: Passau

Government
  - Mayor (2018–24): Christian Fürst (CSU)

Area
  - Total: 49.71 km^{2} (19.19 sq mi)
- Elevation: 373 m (1,224 ft)

Population (2025-12-31)
  - Total: 6,676
  - Density: 134.3/km^{2} (347.8/sq mi)
- Time zone: UTC+01:00 (CET)
  - Summer (DST): UTC+02:00 (CEST)
- Postal codes: 94113
- Dialling codes: 08509
- Vehicle registration: PA
- Website: www.gemeinde-tiefenbach.de

Tiefenbach (German pronunciation: [ˈtiːfn̩bax]) is a municipality in the district of Passau in Bavaria in Germany.

== Geography ==
Tiefenbach lies in the Danube Forest region, in one of the southernmost foothills of the Bavarian Forest northwest of Ilz and north of Danube on Bundesstraße 85. Tiefenbach is located only 9 km north of the university and three-river city Passau.

== History ==
=== Until the church is planted ===
Tiefenbach was already early in the possession of the bishops of Passau, who left it to the Counts of Hals and other noble families as fiefs. The Sünzl von Söldenau family had been associated with the Hofmark since 1613 and were located at Schloss Weideneck near Tiefenbach. In 1690 the Hofmark was sold by Jakob Ferdinand Graf von Thun and Hohenstein to the Bishop of Passau, Tiefenbach henceforth belonged to the Hochstift Passau. With the Reichsdeputationshauptschlus of 1803 the place came to Bavaria. Tiefenbach was one of the few parts of the Hochstift that fell to Bavaria as early as 1803. The political community was founded in 1818.

=== 19th century ===
Since the old church was dilapidated, the present church was built from 1842 to 1844 and consecrated on 12 October 1848 in honour of St. Margaret. In 1855 the village had 16 houses in addition to the parish church.

=== Incorporations ===
Haselbach, Kirchberg and Tiefenbach were independent communities from 1818 to 1971/1972. On 1 January 1972 Haselbach was incorporated into the municipality of Tiefenbach. The greater part of the municipality of Kirchberg was added on 1 July 1972. The rest of the municipality Kirchberg with the district Schalding on the left side of the Danube and Minihof (formerly Mimming) was incorporated into the city of Passau and there added to the newly formed district Hacklberg.

=== Population development ===
- 1961: 3961 inhabitants
- 1970: 4512 inhabitants
- 1987: 5930 inhabitants
- 1991: 6223 inhabitants
- 1995: 6525 inhabitants
- 2000: 6725 inhabitants
- 2005: 6694 inhabitants
- 2010: 6683 inhabitants
- 2015: 6713 inhabitants
