= PSD Bank =

German cooperative banking group

- Company type: Cooperative bank
- Industry: Financial institution
- Founded: 4 January 1872
- Headquarters: Bonn, Germany
- Website: www.psd-bank.de

The PSD Bankengruppe is a German cooperative banking group consisting of 14 autonomous and independent financial institutions. The business model of the PSD banks is a combination of regional direct and affiliated bank. It provides retail banking services via internet, telephone, e-mail, mail and fax or at local branches, it only provides services to retail clients and does not offer banking to self-employed and businesses.

The name PSD originated from the former name Post-Spar- und Darlehnsverein (post-, saving- and loan association). The Post-Spar- und Darlehnsverein banks originally provided financial services by postal clerks only and were assigned to the areas by the post office. They are particularly connected to their area and predominantly operate at a local level.

All PSD banks have a legal structure of a listed cooperative and are therefore cooperative banks. PSD banks are purely private customer banks. Today, with one exception, all 14 PSD banks are in the universal bank business. The PSD banks are part of the Verband der PSD Banken e. V. (union of PSD banks) which is located in Bonn. Besides other services the union acts as auditing association for the banks. All PSD banks are affiliated to the protection scheme of the Bundesverband der Deutschen Volksbanken und Raiffeisenbanken (National Association of German Cooperative Banks) (BVR).

== History ==
The idea for the founding emerged in 1872. On 4 January 1872 the imperial general post office through a writ of general postmaster Heinrich von Stephan encouraged the founding of Spar- und Vorschussvereinen (savings and advancement association) for postal clerk. 36 associations with 12067 were founded in 1872. These were financial institutions in the legal form of an economic association with one exception (Post-Spar- und Darlehnsgenossenschaft Saarbrücken). In 1879 they gained legal capacity as corporate bodies with a firm legal basis through governmental conferment.

In 1903 the Vorschussvereine (advancement associations) became the Post-Spar- und Darlehensvereine (PSpDV).

In the context of the German reunification the PSpDV associations which were located close to the new federal states of Germany expanded their business areas. For example, the PSpDV Frankfurt am Main (which up to that point was responsible for Hessen) took on Thuringia.

Until 1998 no PSpDVs were universal banks so not all bank services were offered. Also, up to that point only clerks and employees of the former Deutsche Bundespost (German Federal Post Office) as well as their relatives were accepted as customers and members of the banks. Up to that point a close co-operation existed with the Deutsche Postbank or its predecessors Postscheckämtern or Postgiroämtern. The co-operation enabled postal clerks who kept a check account with the Post Office to add an overdraft facility to their check account which was not offered by the Post Office itself.

Over the course of 1998/99 all 21 PSpDVs were opened bit by bit for non-postal clerk or employees. Except the PSpDV Hannover all associations introduced the universal bank business (check accounts, stock broking etc.) as part of this change. Because of the complicated legal form of an association the PSpDVs one by one also changed their legal forms. This is how the associations were gradually transformed into listed cooperatives. As now the label "post" as well as the label "association" in the name of the banks did not apply anymore the banks took on the already commonly used name PSD and henceforth called themselves PSD Bank.

In the following years 2000 until today a number of PSD banks merged so that today only 14 of the original 21 PSD banks exist.

Today Fiducia & GAD IT AG is the data center and IT service provider of the 14 PSD banks in Germany; prior it was the datacenter of the Sparda-Banks in Nuremberg. In August 2009 the PSD banks formed a collaboration with financial service provider Hypoport for process optimization and the development of collective products.

In 2015 a decision was made for the entire banking group to introduce video authentication. In the end of 2015 the PSD Bank Niederbayern-Oberpfalz eG withdrew from the Verband der PSD Banken e. V. (union of PSD banks) and therefore from the banking group.

== The 14 PSD banks (name and location) ==
- PSD-Bank Berlin-Brandenburg eG, location Berlin
- PSD-Bank Braunschweig eG, location Braunschweig
- PSD-Bank Hannover eG, location Hanover
- PSD-Bank Hessen-Thüringen eG, location Eschborn (former PSD-Bank Frankfurt am Main eG)
- PSD-Bank Karlsruhe-Neustadt eG, location Karlsruhe, merger of
  - PSD-Bank Karlsruhe eG, location Karlsruhe
  - PSD-Bank Neustadt eG, location Speyer
- PSD Bank Kiel|PSD-Bank Kiel eG, location Kiel
- PSD-Bank Koblenz eG, location Koblenz
- PSD-Bank Köln eG, location Cologne, merger of
  - PSD-Bank Köln eG, location Cologne
  - PSD-Bank Trier eG, location Trier
- PSD Bank München eG, location Augsburg
- PSD-Bank Nord eG, location Hamburg, merger of
  - PSD-Bank Bremen eG, location Bremen
  - PSD-Bank Hamburg eG, location Hamburg
- PSD-Bank Nürnberg eG, location Nuremberg
- PSD-Bank RheinNeckarSaar eG, location Stuttgart, merger of
  - PSD-Bank Saarbrücken eG, location Saarbrücken
  - PSD-Bank Stuttgart-Freiburg eG, location Stuttgart, merger of
    - PSD-Bank Stuttgart eG, location Stuttgart
    - PSD-Bank Freiburg eG, location Freiburg im Breisgau
- PSD-Bank Rhein-Ruhr eG, location Düsseldorf, merger of
  - PSD-Bank Dortmund eG, location Dortmund
  - PSD-Bank Düsseldorf eG, location Düsseldorf
- PSD-Bank Westfalen-Lippe eG, location Münster (former PSD-Bank Münster eG)

=== Former PSD bank ===
- PSD Bank Niederbayern-Oberpfalz eG, location Regensburg (withdrew from the PSD banking group on 31 December 2015)

== See also ==
- List of banks in Germany
