= Bundesverband deutscher Banken =

German commercial banking association

Coordinates: 52.5216°N 13.4007°E

The Bundesverband deutscher Banken (BdB, also branded as Bankenverband and in English as Association of German Banks) is the representative body of profit-oriented banks in Germany and a key lobby group for Germany's financial sector.

The BdB is a member of the German Banking Industry Committee that brings it together with its peers representing the other segments or "pillars" of German banking, namely the BVR for cooperative banks, the DSGV for savings banks, the VÖB mainly for public promotional banks, and VdP for specialized mortgage banks. The BdB is also a member of the European Banking Federation (EBF) together with the VÖB, Germany being the only country represented in the EBF by more than one member.

== History ==
The BdB was founded in 1951 in Cologne as an Eingetragener Verein, succeeding the pre-war Centralverband des deutschen Bank- und Bankiergewerbes (1901-1945), which was based in Berlin. In 1999 it moved back to Berlin, while its the publishing subsidiary Bankverlag remained in Cologne. The association also maintains an office in Brussels.

== Membership ==
The BdB has six categories of members. As of January 2024, these included:

- 3 "large banks" (German: Grossbanken): Commerzbank, Deutsche Bank, and UniCredit Bank GmbH
- 56 "regional banks" (German: Regionalbanken), i.e. small and middle-sized commercial banks
- 15 "private bankers" (German: Privatbankiers), most of them in the form of silent partnerships (German: Kommanditgesellschaft, KG)
- 21 "extraordinary members" (German: Außerordentliche Mitglieder), including fintech companies and foreign-owned banks
- 78 "foreign banks" (German: Auslandsbanken), including both branches and subsidiaries of banking groups headquartered in other EU countries and the rest of the world
- 7 regional associations, down from 11 following consolidation in 2021: Bankenverband Baden-Württemberg e.V. in Stuttgart, Bankenverband Mitte e.V. in Frankfurt, Bankenverband Nordrhein-Westfalen e.V. in Düsseldorf, Bankenverband Schleswig-Holstein e.V. in Kiel, Bayerischer Bankenverband e.V. in Munich, Norddeutscher Bankenverband e.V. in Hamburg, and Ostdeutscher Bankenverband e.V. in Berlin. The regional associations bring together local branches and affiliates of the BdB's member banks in the respective region.

== Deposit guarantee schemes ==
The BdB manages two separate but interrelated deposit guarantee schemes:

- The original deposit guarantee fund (German: Einlagensicherungsfonds) was created in 1975 in reaction to the disorderly failure of Herstatt Bank in June 1974, in order to offset the perceived competitive advantage of the Sparkassen and cooperative banks given the former's public guarantees and the latter's long-established mutual protection scheme.
- The statutory deposit guarantee scheme (German: Entschädigungseinrichtung deutscher Banken, EdB) was established in 1998, following a change in EU legislation that mandated the creation of a statutory system, a requirement with which the voluntary nature of the Einlagensicherungsfonds could not fit..

As of 2024, the EdB insures deposits up to the harmonized European limit of €100,000 per account, in line with the EU Deposit Guarantee Scheme Directive (DGSD). The Einlagensicherungsfonds acts as an additional or "top-up" fund which provides additional deposit guarantee, up to 5 million euro for individuals and 50 million for corporate entities.

In 2021, the collapse of Greensill Capital and its German banking arm resulted in an obligation for the BdB deposit insurance to pay out €2.7 billion to more than 20,000 former customers of the bank. Following that event, the BdB decided to reduce its deposit insurance coverage. The levels are planned to be gradually reduced to reach 1 million for individuals and 10 million for corporate entities by 2030.

== Auditing Association ==
The Auditing Association of German Banks (German: Prüfungsverband deutscher Banken e.V., PdB), established in 1969 in Cologne, is a sister entity to the BdB and is tasked with assessing the risk of each participating BdB member which feeds into the calculation of EdB and ESF deposit guarantee fees. It is led by a 3-members management board.

The membership of the Prüfungsverband largely overlaps with that of the Bankenverband: as of early 2024, it included all Grossbanken and Privatbanken, all Regionalbanken except Westend Bank in Frankfurt, and nearly half of the Auslandsbanken.

== Leadership ==
The BdB is led by an executive board or Vorstand. The three large banks (Grossbanken, namely Deutsche Bank, Commerzbank, and Hypovereinsbank) each nominate one member; the small privately owned banks (Privatbankiers) collectively have two seats; the second-tier commercial banks known as regional banks (German: Regionalbanken) have four seats; and the foreign banks (other than Italian-owned Hypovereinsbank) have one seat. Ex officio, the General Manager (German: Hauptgeschäftsführer) of the BdB is also a member of the Vorstand.

The board elects a President (German: Präsident) along with two alternates, which together form the Präsidium. By tradition, the President role should be held alternating between the big banks and the other members of private and regional banks, but that rule is not followed strictly.

The daily business is led by the collective Management Board (German: Geschäftsführung), which is led by the General Manager.

=== Presidents ===
- 1951–1960 Robert Pferdmenges (Sal. Oppenheim)
- 1960–1967 Gotthard von Falkenhausen (HSBC Trinkaus)
- 1968–1975 Alwin Münchmeyer (Schröder, Münchmeyer, Hengst & Co.)
- 1975–1979 Wilhelm Christians (Deutsche Bank)
- 1979–1983 Harald Kühnen (Sal. Oppenheim)
- 1983–1987 Hanns Christian Schroeder-Hohenwarth (BHF-Bank)
- 1987–1991 Wolfgang Röller (Dresdner Bank)
- 1991–1994 Eberhard Martini (Bayerische Hypotheken- und Wechselbank)
- 1994–1997 Karl-Heinz Wessel (Sal. Oppenheim)
- 1997–2000 Martin Kohlhaussen (Commerzbank)
- 2000–2001 Frank Heintzeler (Baden-Württembergische Bank)
- 2001–2005 Rolf-Ernst Breuer (Deutsche Bank)
- 2005–2009 Klaus-Peter Müller (Commerzbank)
- 2009-2013 Andreas Schmitz (HSBC Trinkaus)
- 2013–2016 Jürgen Fitschen (Deutsche Bank)
- 2016–April 2020 and August 2020-June 2021: Hans-Walter Peters (Berenberg Bank)
- April-August 2020: Martin Zielke (Commerzbank)
- July 2021-: Christian Sewing (Deutsche Bank)

=== General Managers ===
- Helmuth Cammann, 1966-1992
- Manfred Weber, 1992-2010
- Michael Kemmer, 2010-2017
- Andreas Krautscheid, 2018-2022
- Christian Ossig, 2018-2023 (jointly with Krautscheid until early 2022)
- Heiner Herkenhoff, from April 2023

== Controversy ==
From 2016 until 2017, a parliamentary fact-finding committee probed BdB’s potential involvement in tax fraud involving multi-billion-euro trades to get bogus tax reclaims, following the revelations by the CumEx Files; however, the probe proved unable to access emails and documents from BdB. In 2020, public prosecutors on raided the Berlin and Frankfurt offices of BdB as part of a similar investigation.

== See also ==
- Fédération Bancaire Française
- Associazione Bancaria Italiana
- Asociación Española de Banca
- List of banks in Germany
