= European Banking Federation =

Banking industry organization

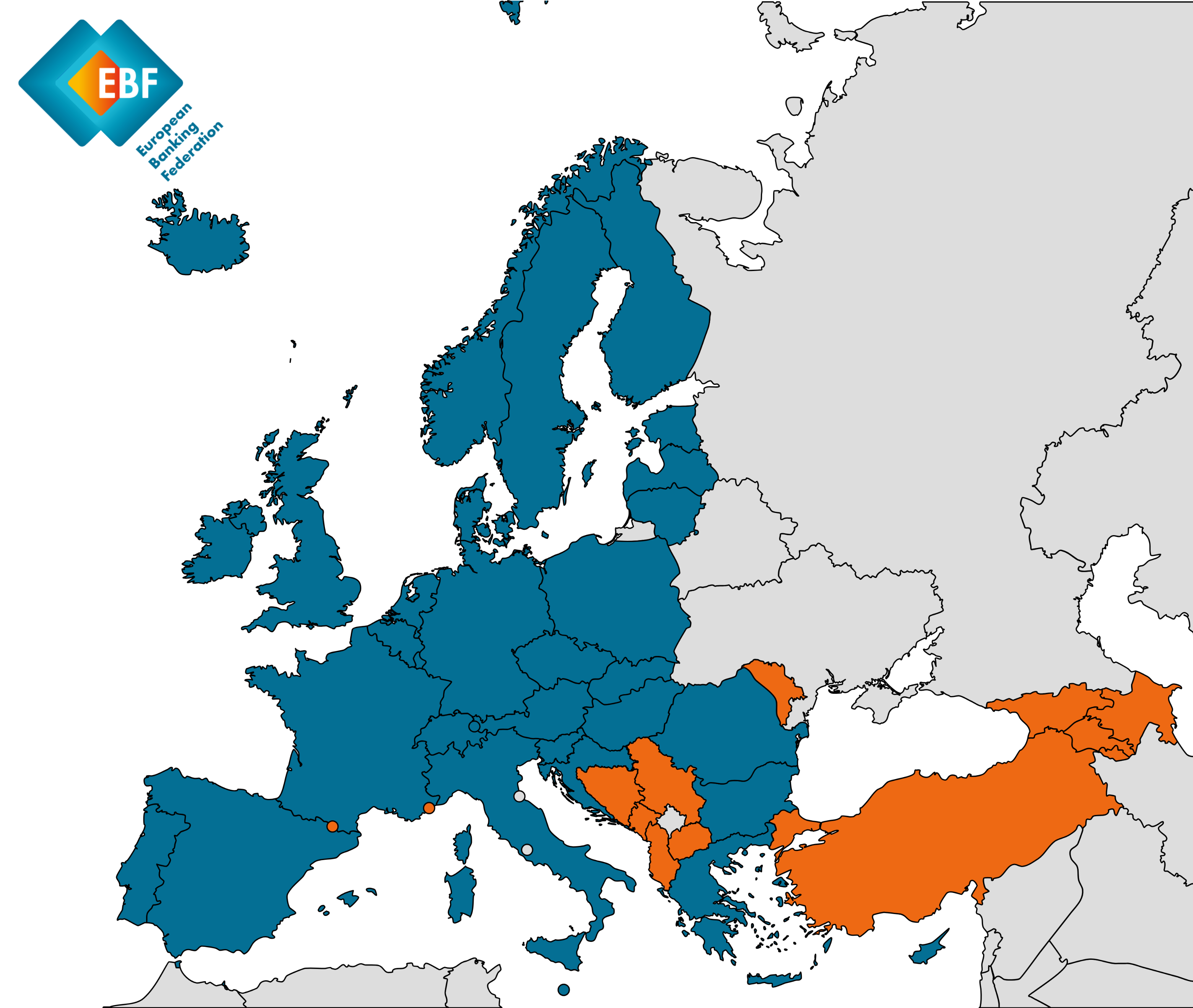
- Abbreviation: EBF
- Formation: 1960; 66 years ago
- Legal status: non-profit trade association
- Location: Brussels, Belgium
- Region served: Europe
- Members: 32 national associations
- President: Slawomir Krupa (2025-)
- Website: ebf.eu

The European Banking Federation (EBF) is a trade association representing national banking associations in countries of the European Union, the European Free Trade Association, and the United Kingdom. It represents over 5,000 institutions It was established in 1960 as the Fédération bancaire européenne.

It serves as the primary forum for cooperation and dialogue between the European banking industry, policymakers, and regulators, advocating for policies that support the banking ecosystem and a strong European Single Market. The EBF is actively involved in shaping financial regulation, promoting innovation, and addressing issues such as sustainable finance, digital transformation, and financial stability across Europe.

== Members ==
As of January 2024, the EBF's members were:

- Austria - Verband österreichischer Banken und Bankiers (Bankenverband)
- Belgium - Federation of the Belgian Financial Sector (Febelfin)
- Bulgaria - Асоциация на банките в България / Association of Banks in Bulgaria (ABB)
- Croatia - Hrvatska udruga banaka / Croatian Banking Association (HUB)
- Cyprus - Association of Cyprus Banks (ACB)
- Czech Republic - Czech Banking Association (CBA)
- Denmark - Finans Danmark
- Estonia - Estonian Banking Association (Eesti Pangaliit)
- Finland - Finance Finland (FA)
- France - Fédération Bancaire Française (FBF)
- Germany - Bundesverband deutscher Banken (BdB) and Association of German Public Banks (VÖB)
- Greece - Ελληνική Ένωση Τραπεζών / Hellenic Bank Association (HBA)
- Hungary - Magyar Bankszövetség
- Iceland - Samtök fjármálafyrirtækja (SFF)
- Ireland - Banking and Payments Federation Ireland (BPFI)
- Italy - Associazione Bancaria Italiana (ABI)
- Latvia - Finance Latvia Association
- Liechtenstein - Liechtensteinische Bankenverband / Liechtenstein Bankers Association
- Lithuania - Lietuvos Bankų Asociacija / Lithuanian Banking Association (LBA)
- Luxembourg - Association des Banques et Banquiers Luxembourg (ABBL)
- Malta - Malta Bankers' Association (MBA)
- Netherlands - Dutch Banking Association (NVB)
- Norway - Finance Norway
- Poland - Związek Banków Polskich (ZBP)
- Portugal - Associação Portuguesa de Bancos (APB)
- Romania - Asociația Română a Băncilor / Romanian Association of Banks (ARB)
- Slovakia - Slovak Banking Association (SBA)
- Slovenia - Združenje bank Slovenije / The Bank Association of Slovenia (ZBS)
- Spain - Asociación Española de Banca (AEB)
- Sweden - Swedish Bankers' Association
- Switzerland - Swiss Bankers Association (Swiss Banking)
- United Kingdom - UK Finance

At the same date, ten countries had associate status: Albania, Andorra, Armenia, Bosnia and Herzegovina, North Macedonia, Moldova, Monaco, Montenegro, Serbia and Turkey.

== Presidents ==
The following list shows in chronological order the presidents of the European Banking Federation (EBF). Terms generally last two years.

Years	President	Nationality	Institution	Notes / Source
1994–1996	Giuseppe Zadra	Italy	Associazione Bancaria Italiana (ABI)	First term
2002–2004	Maurizio Sella	Italy	Associazione Bancaria Italiana (ABI)	
2004–2006	Michel Pébereau	France	BNP Paribas	
2006–2008	Giuseppe Zadra	Italy	Associazione Bancaria Italiana (ABI)	Second term
2009–2011	Alessandro Profumo	Italy	UniCredit	
2011–2014	Christian Clausen	Denmark	Nordea	Two consecutive terms;
2015–2019	Frédéric Oudéa	France	Société Générale	Two consecutive terms;
2019–2021	Jean-Pierre Mustier	Italy	UniCredit	
2021–2023	Ana Botín	Spain	Banco Santander	
2023–2025	Christian Sewing	Germany	Deutsche Bank	
2025–present	Slawomir Krupa	France	Société Générale	

== See also ==
- Association for Financial Markets in Europe
- Eurofi
- Bank Policy Institute
