= Frédéric Oudéa =

French businessman (born 1963)

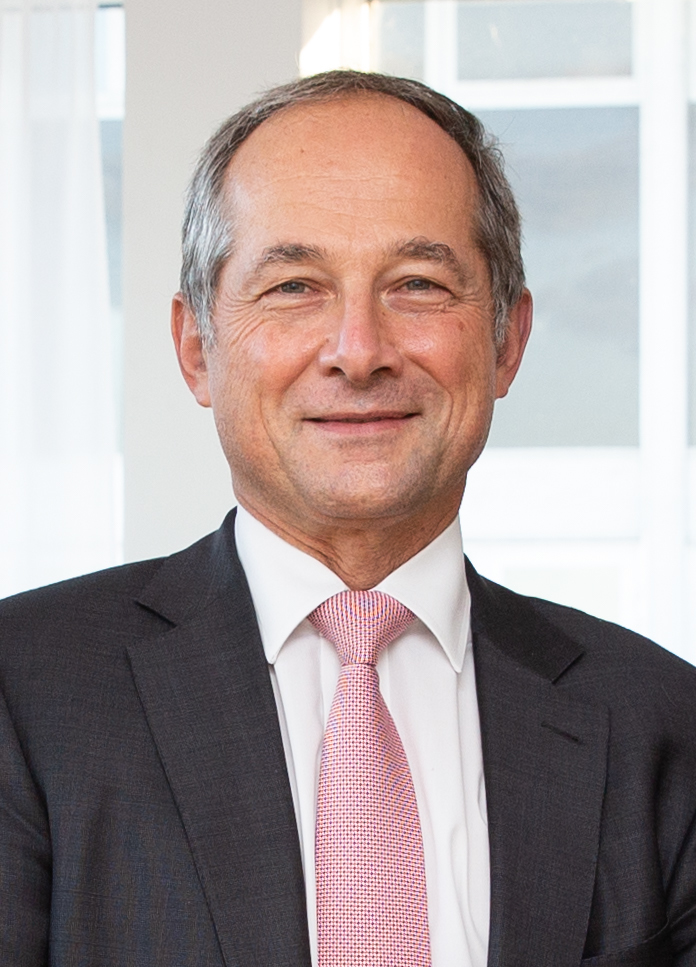
- Oudéa in 2021
- Born: 3 July 1963 (age 63); Paris, France
- Education: Lycée Louis-le-Grand
- Alma mater: École polytechnique École nationale d'administration
- Occupation: CEO Société Générale
- Spouse: Amélie Castéra (m. 2006)
- Children: 5

Frédéric Oudéa (born 3 July 1963) is a French businessman who was CEO of Société Générale, and is president of the European Banking Federation.

== Early life ==
Oudéa grew up in Paris. His father Paul was a medical professor who died when Frederic was 13. After this, Oudéa reportedly took care of his two younger brothers. Though he originally planned to be a surgeon, as his forebears were doctors, he opted instead to attend the Lycee Louis-Le-Grand to study engineering. He then went to the École polytechnique, followed by the École nationale d'administration. During his stint there, he backpacked through Canada, Nepal, and Burma with Stéphane Richard.

== Career ==
=== Career in the public sector ===
After his education at École polytechnique and École nationale d'administration in France, Oudéa worked in the economic sector of the French civil service from 1987 until 1995. His roles during this period included Technical Adviser in the office of Nicolas Sarkozy, and Minister of Budget and Communication in 1993. He also worked in other government offices, including the audit department of the ministry of finance, the ministry of economy and finance, the budget ministry, and the cabinet of the ministry of treasury and communication. According to one report, the highlight of his career in the service was his time in 1993 with Sarkozy.

=== Career at Société Générale ===
Oudéa joined Société Générale in 1995 after being recruited by then-CEO Daniel Bouton, and has worked in various positions within the bank since that time, in both Paris and London. His first role was as deputy head of the bank's corporate banking division in London, where he later became head. In 1998, he was appointed to head the group's global supervisory arm, and was in charge of development of the equities division. He then was deputy CFO and CFO of the bank from 2002 until May 2008, when he took up his current position of CEO.

In November 2014, Oudéa was elected as the president of the European Banking Federation for a two-year term, effective 1 January 2015, succeeding Christian Clausen, president and CEO of Nordea Bank.

During his first years in office, Oudéa came under pressure from investors and analysts due to the bank's poor performance. In 2019, the bank announced a cost reduction plan, which included cutting 1,600 jobs. That same year, Société Générale shareholders voted to give Oudéa another four-year term. In May 2022, Oudéa announced that he would not be seeking renewal after his term in office comes to an end in 2023.

== Later career ==
In 2025, financial technology company Revolut hired Oudéa as chairman for its western European operations headquartered in Paris, as it prepared to apply for a banking licence in the country.

== Other activities ==
=== Corporate boards ===
- Sanofi, Non-Executive Chair of the Board of Directors (since 2022)
- Capgemini, Independent Member of the Board of Directors (since 2018)
- Umicore, Member of the Supervisory Board (since 2024)

=== Non-profit organizations ===
- Institute of International Finance (IIF), Chairman of the Steering Committee on Regulatory Capital (since 2010)

Business positions
Preceded by Daniel Bouton	CEO of Société Générale; 2009–2023	Succeeded by Slawomir Krupa
