= Oudéa =

Oudéa is a surname. Notable people with the surname include:

- Amélie Oudéa-Castéra (born 1978), French politician, businesswoman, and tennis player
- Frédéric Oudéa (born 1963), French businessman, president of the European Banking Federation
