= Duppach =

- Municipality
- Coat of arms

- Location of Duppach within Vulkaneifel district
- Interactive map of Duppach
- Location within Germany Location within Rhineland-Palatinate
- Coordinates: 50°15′38″N 6°34′00″E
- Country: Germany
- State: Rhineland-Palatinate
- District: Vulkaneifel
- Municipal assoc.: Gerolstein

Government
  - Mayor (2019–24): Gottfried Wawers

Area
  - Total: 10.28 km^{2} (3.97 sq mi)
- Elevation: 461 m (1,512 ft)

Population (2025-12-31)
  - Total: 270
  - Density: 26/km^{2} (68/sq mi)
- Time zone: UTC+01:00 (CET)
  - Summer (DST): UTC+02:00 (CEST)
- Postal codes: 54597
- Dialling codes: 06558
- Vehicle registration: DAU
- Website: www.duppach.de

Duppach is an Ortsgemeinde (a municipality), part of a group of municipalities called the Verbandsgemeinde of Gerolstein, which is located in the town of Gerolstein in the Vulkaneifel district of the state of Rhineland-Palatinate, Germany.

== Geography ==
=== Location ===
Duppach is located in the Vulkaneifel, a part of the Eifel region known for its volcanic origins, geographical and geological features. There is still ongoing volcanic activity and gases sometimes well up from the earth. The elevation of the region of Duppach ranges from 400 to 600 m above sea level. The village itself is located on slightly lower ground at 460 m above sea level. The towns of Hillesheim and Gerolstein are both 10 km away. The town of Prüm is 13 km away.

=== Duppacher Maar (Duppacher Weiher) Volcano ===
The former 16-hectare Duppacher Maar (Duppacher Weiher) is a volcano and was dried around 1930.

- To the north, between Duppach and Steffeln, is the Eichholzmaar, a volcanic maar with its mineral springs of Steffelner Drees and Aueler Drees.

== History ==
At archaeological digs in the outlying area of Weiermühle which began in 2002, remnants of a Roman villa and two large burial monuments were found. The Archäologischer Förderverein Duppach e.V. (“Duppach Club for the Promotion of Archaeology”) founded in 2003 has been continuing work on the digs, albeit at irregular intervals. The digs are supervised by Dr. Peter Henrich.

In 843, Duppach is mentioned for the first time as Duibach in period documents. From 1334 until the French Revolution, Duppach was part of the County of Manderscheid-Blankenheim. Since 1970, it is part of the Verbandsgemeinde of Gerolstein.

== Politics ==
=== Municipal Council ===
The council has 8 members, who were elected by majority vote at the municipal elections held on June 7, 2009, and the mayor is its chairperson.

=== Coat of arms ===
The German blazon reads: Durch Wellenschnitt von Gold über blau geteilt; oben ein wachsender schwarzer, rotbewehrter Löwe, unten zwei silberne Hirschstangen, ein goldenes Kreuz einschließend.

Here is a description of the municipality’s arms in English heraldic: A rampant black lion with red claws is shown above a pair of white deer antlers surrounding a gold cross with a background of gold over blue divided by a wavy line.

The charge in the upper half of the escutcheon is taken from the coat of arms used by the old Counts of Manderscheid-Blankenheim, which included a lion rampant in the same tinctures as the lion in Duppach’s arms, although in the latter, it is a demi-lion cut off by the dividing line. The pair of antlers (“attires”) surrounding the cross is one of Saint Hubert’s attributes, thus making it a reference to the patron saint of the village and of its church. The wavy line of partition symbolizes the many streams found in the area.

== Culture and sightseeing ==
=== Buildings ===
The current graveyard chapel dates back to the year 1330 and is one of the Eifel’s oldest churches. In 1926, the larger Baroque Revival Saint Hubert Church (St. Hubertus-Kirche) was built, as the older building was no longer large enough to suit the needs of the parish. Since its destruction in the Second World War, all that is left of the 14th-century church today is the chancel which is used as a graveyard chapel.

In the 1950s, the AEG electrical company had a retirement home built in the Duppacher Wald (forest around Duppach) for Konrad Adenauer, who was Chancellor of Germany at the time. However, once the press heard of this corruption and reported it, work on the house was stopped. The half-finished house still stands in the woods and has been falling to ruins ever since.

Other buildings of interest include the following:

- Auf dem langen Garten 1 – house that was once part of a two-sided estate (former rectory) originally built around 1743, its current outward appearance is more recent.
- Hauptstraße – remnants of the former Saint Hubert Catholic Church, Late Gothic, built in 1551.
- Hauptstraße 25 – Quereinhaus (combined residential and commercial space divided down the middle in a line which is perpendicular to the street), built in 1876, cobbled courtyard.
- Wayside cross, north of the village on the road to Steffeln, sandstone pedestal cross, 19th century.
- Weiermühle 13/15 – stately home built in 1815.

=== Acidic spring ===
About 1 000 m outside the village, there is an acidic spring (known in the Eifel as Drees) where villagers come to collect mineral water. The spring is rich in iron and minerals. The water is also rich in carbonic acid (H_{2}CO_{3}), known to many as soda water, which is typical of the Eifel region, a former volcanic area.

== Famous people ==
- Klaus-Peter Müller, Chairman of the Board of Governors at Commerzbank AG, was born on September 16, 1944, in Duppach.
