= Eichholzmaar =

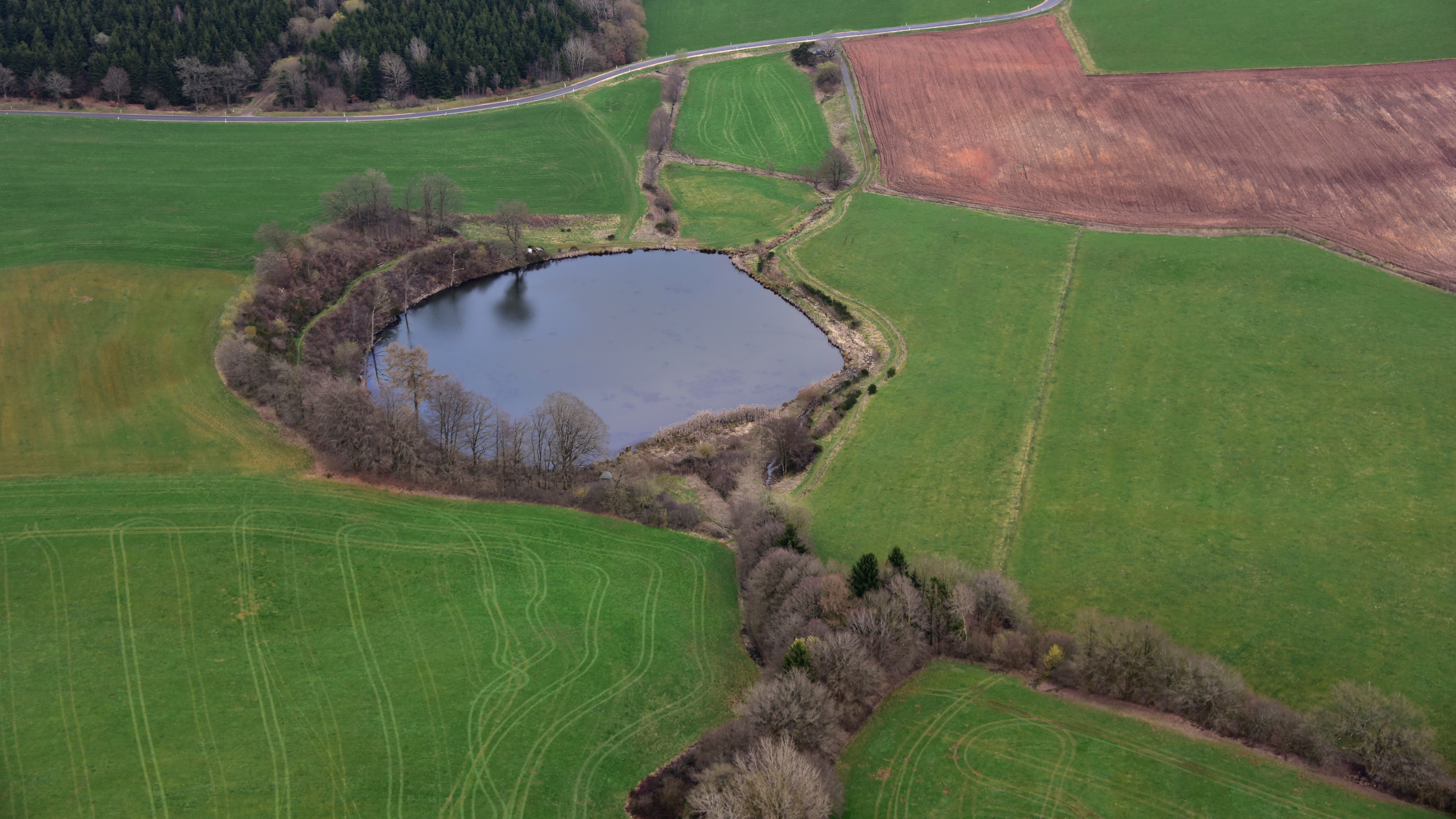
Eichholzmaar, 2016 aerial photo

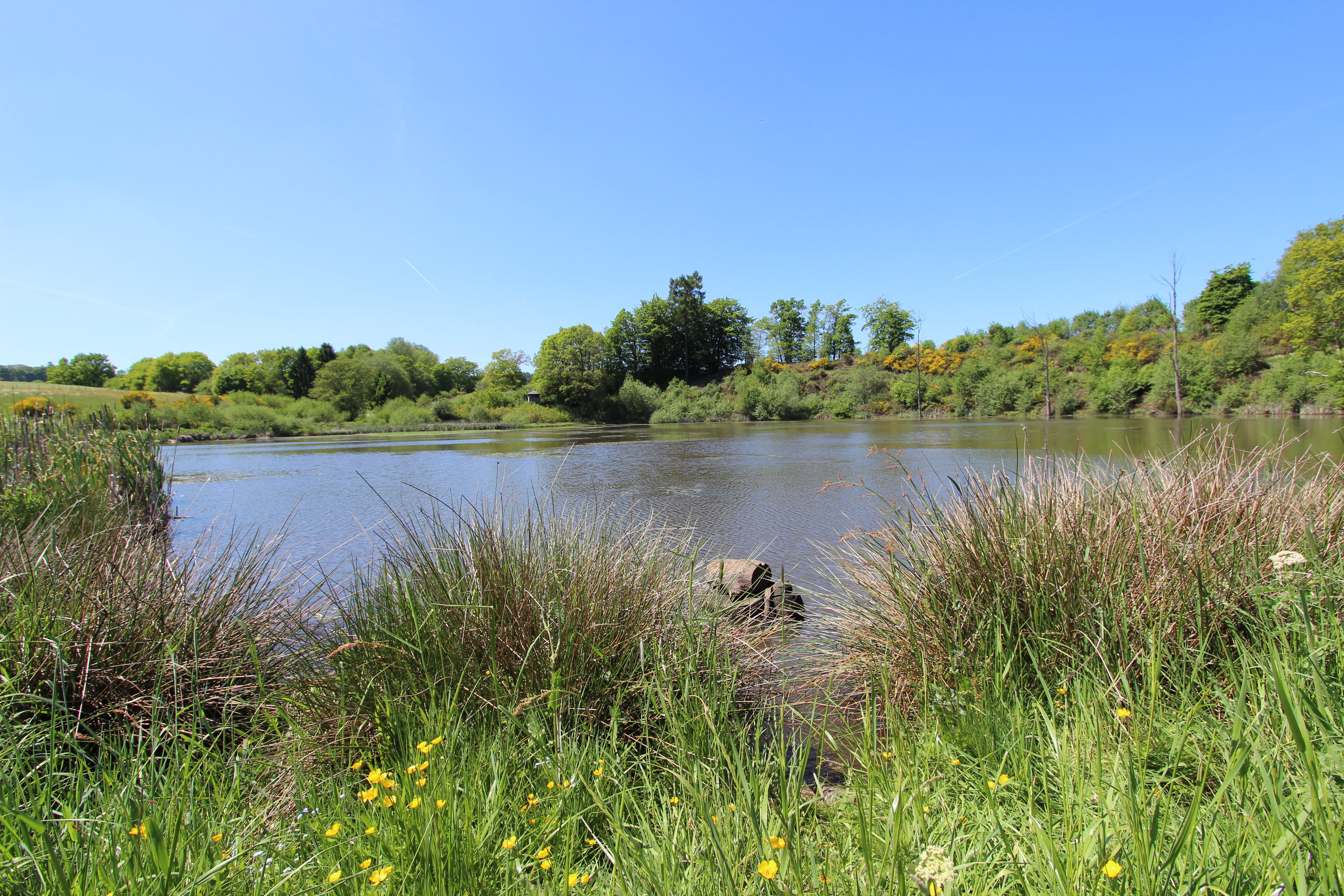
Eichholzmaar

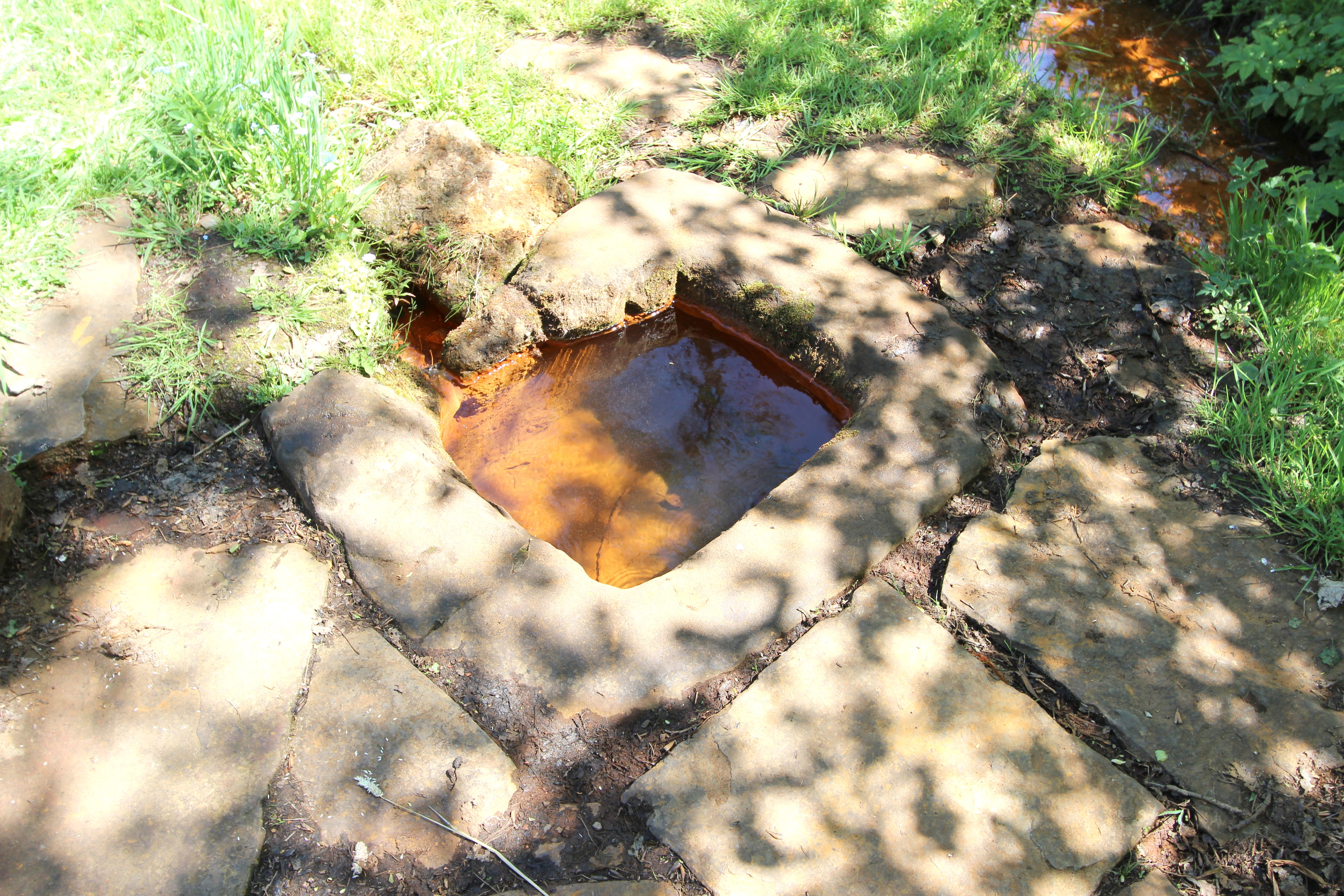
Steffelner Drees (mineral spring)

The Eichholzmaar is one of the smaller maars in the Volcanic Eifel and lies on the Landstraße between Steffeln and Duppach. It has a diameter of c. 120 metres. Its greatest depth is 3 metres.

The circular shape of the bowl of the maar can still be easily seen. It lies exactly on a geological fault line, which runs from northwest to southeast.

At the beginning of the 20th century the maar was drained in order to create meadows. From late summer 2007 to spring 2008 a renaturalisation was carried out and the lake restored with an area of c. 1,1 hectares. In only a few years the maar has become a refuge for rare water birds and reptiles.

Two natural mineral springs in the immediate vicinity of the maar are accessible on foot. About 300 metres upstream in a westerly direction from the Eichholzmaar is the mineral spring known as the Steffelner Dress (50.272306°N 6.560166°E). Around 270 metres downstream in an easterly direction from the Eichholzmaar is the mineral spring of Aueler Dress (50.271907°N 6.571413°E).

Detailed scientific research of the Eichholzmaar has been carried out by the universities of Jena and Frankfurt.

For visitors to the maar between April and October, there is the option of joining one of the regular guided tours by the local branch of the Eifel Club.
