= Casper von Koskull =

Finnish banker

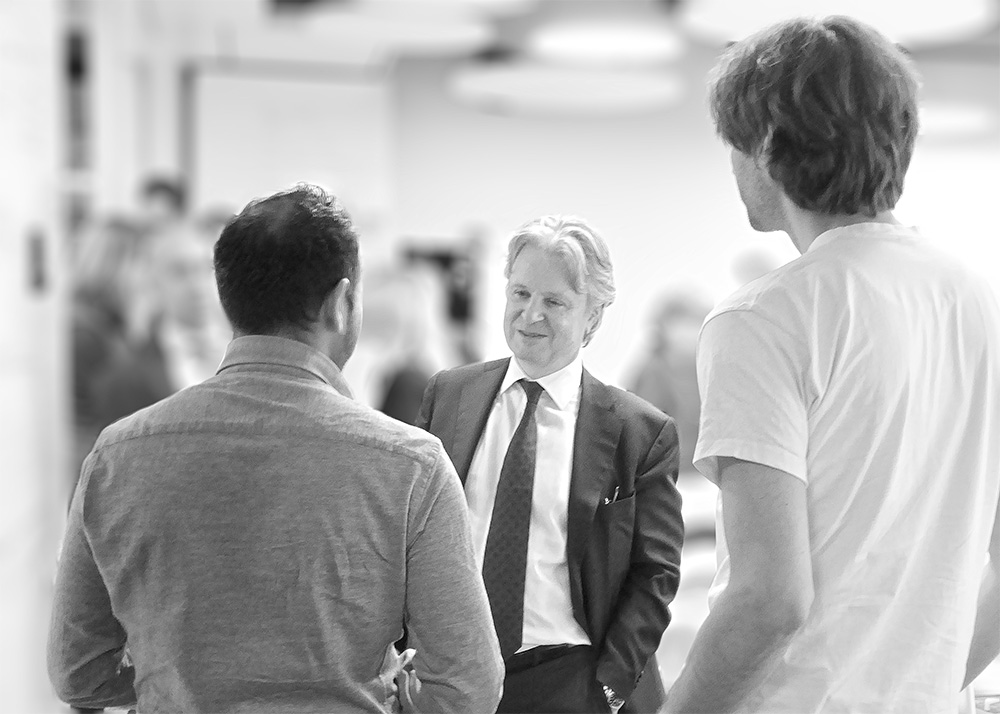
- Born: September 1960 (age 65)
- Education: Aalto University
- Occupation: Banker
- Title: President and CEO, Nordea

Casper von Koskull (born September 1960) is a Finnish banker, former president and CEO of Nordea Bank Abp, the Nordic financial services group, since 1 November 2015, when he succeeded Christian Clausen. He is member of the Koskull noble family.

Von Koskull has a master's degree in economics and an MBA from Aalto University. He worked in investment banking as a managing director and partner at Goldman Sachs for many years.

Before becoming CEO in 2015, von Koskull was Nordea's head of wholesale banking since 2010.

Von Koskull announced his retirement in 2020.
