= Asociación Española de Banca =

Spanish bank association

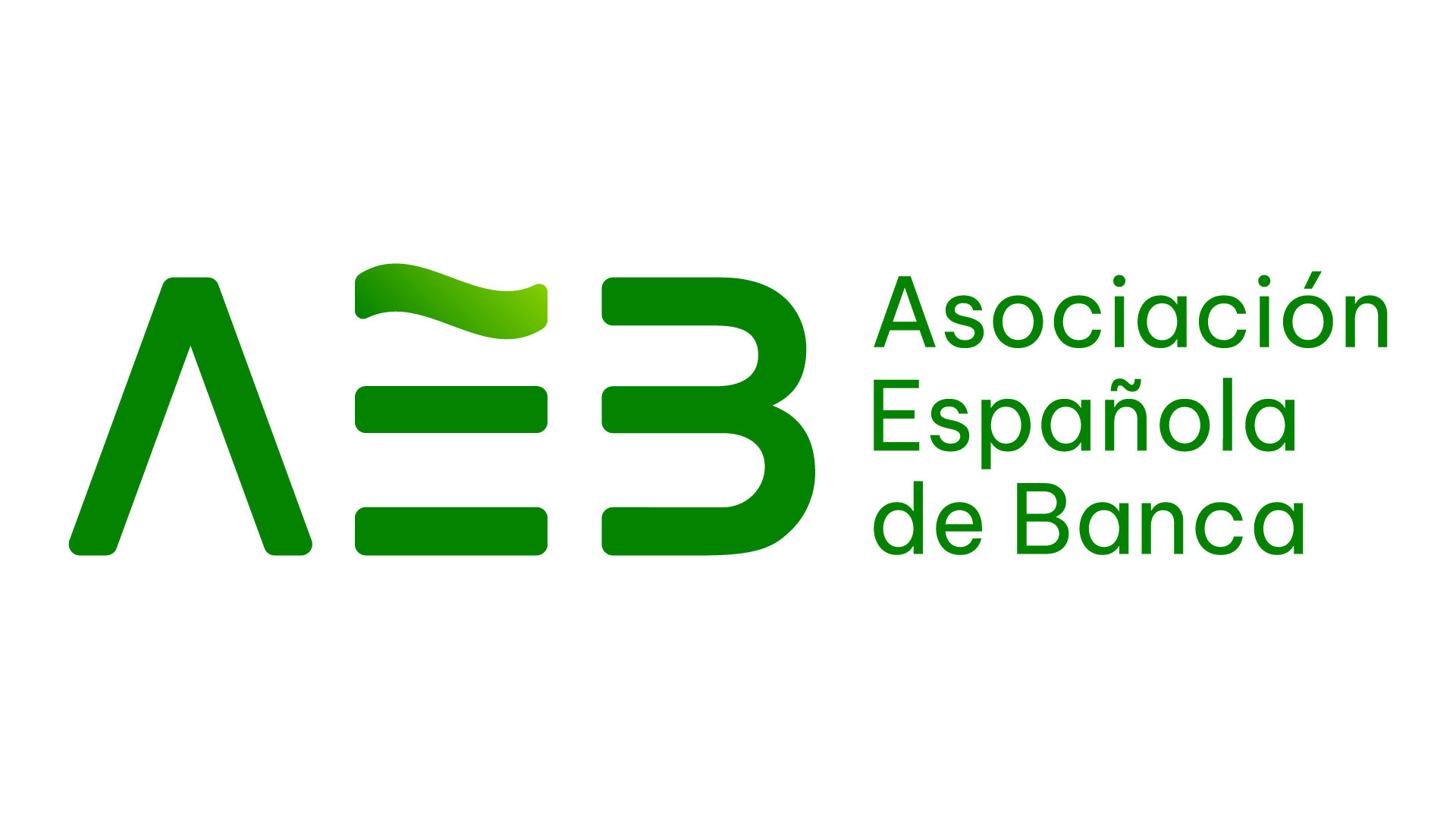
- Abbreviation: AEB
- Formation: 1977; 49 years ago
- Legal status: non-profit organization
- Location: Madrid, Spain
- Region served: Spain
- President: Alejandra Kindelán
- Parent organization: European Banking Federation
- Website: aebanca.es

The Spanish Banking Association, officially and in Spanish Asociación Española de Banca (AEB), is a professional association open to all Spanish and foreign banks operating in Spain.

Although membership in the AEB is voluntary, in practice all banks with significant activity in Spain are members of the AEB. The Spanish Banking Association represents Spanish banks in the European Banking Federation (EBF) and, through it, in the International Banking Federation, participating in their governing bodies, committees, and working groups. Furthermore, it collaborates as an adherent entity with the Spanish Mortgage Association (Asociación Hipotecaria Española). Its current president is Alejandra Kindelán Oteyza, who replaced José María Roldán Alegre on April 5, 2022.

== History ==
It was created in 1977 under the protection of the law that regulates the right of trade union association. It has its own legal personality and assets, independent of the associated entities. Since 1994, it also assumed the functions of the defunct Superior Banking Council.

== Functions ==
The AEB represents and defends the collective interests of its members in the areas of their activity. To fulfill these purposes, the AEB carries out the following functions:

- Channels, on behalf of its associates, the dialogue of the banking sector with the public administration, political parties, parliamentary groups, trade union organizations, other business or social organizations, and the media.
- Distributes among its members the communications that the Public Administration, the economic authorities, or the Bank of Spain wish to transmit to the banks regarding recommendations on their performance, application of regulations, or requests for collaboration, including communications from the administration of justice requiring information on banking operations or the blocking of accounts and deposits.
- Negotiates the collective bargaining agreement affecting the sector with the trade union representatives.
- Is responsible for the periodic publication of the balance sheets, income statements, and consolidated financial statements of the banks. Furthermore, it prepares statistics and reports on the situation and evolution of the banking business in Spain.
- Carries out the study of any matter of a legal or juridical nature that is of common interest to the member banks, as well as providing information to its members about any initiative, regulatory or otherwise, that may affect their activity.
- Prepares reports on the economic outlook and the situation of financial markets.
- Facilitates self-regulation in those matters that require adherence to common principles of action established at a European and, eventually, national level.

Through the AEB Foundation, it sponsors CUNEF Universidad, an institution of recognized and consolidated teaching prestige, through which it contributes to academic training in financial and banking matters.

== Presidents ==
- Rafael Termes: 1977-1990
- José Luis Leal Maldonado: 1990-2006
- Miguel Martín Fernández: 2006-2014
- José María Roldán Alegre: 2014-2022
- Alejandra Kindelán Oteyza: 2022-present

== See also ==
- List of banks in Spain
