= Klaus-Peter Müller =

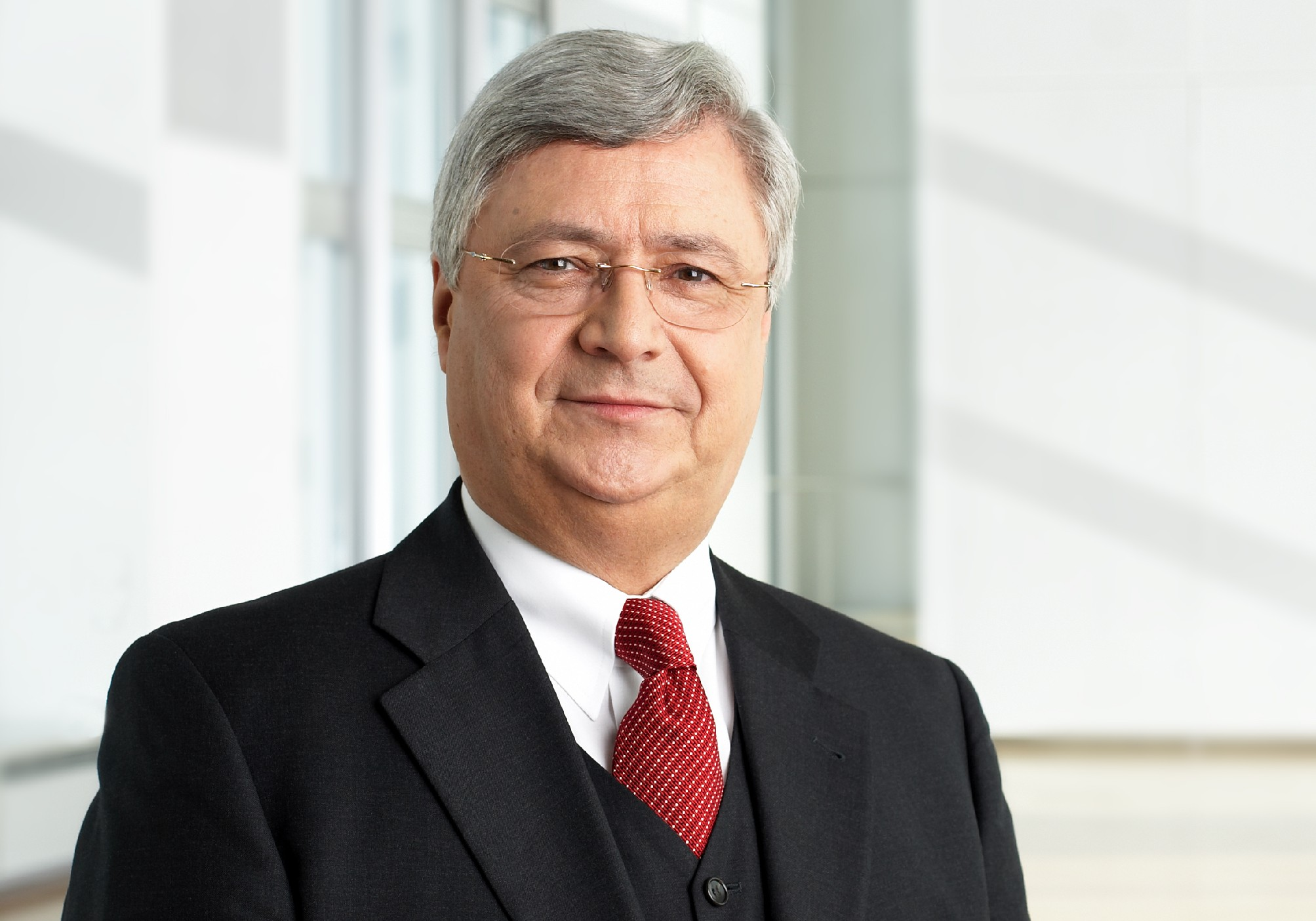
- Klaus-Peter Müller, 2018
- Born: 16 September 1944 (age 81)
- Occupation: Banker
- Known for: Banking (Commerzbank)
- Predecessor: Martin Kohlhaussen
- Successor: Martin Blessing

Klaus-Peter Müller (born 16 September 1944 in Duppach, Germany) was chairman of the supervisory board of Commerzbank until the annual general meeting on 8 May 2018.

== Early life and education ==
Klaus-Peter Müller is the son of Peter Müller, a former voluntary mayor of the city of Düsseldorf. After finishing his apprenticeship at the Bankhaus Friedrich Simon bank in Düsseldorf (1962–1964), he completed military service (1964–1966) in a number of roles, for example as a reserve officer candidate at Radio Andernach, the radio station of the Psychological Defence Force (Truppe für Psychologische Verteidigung). He finished his military service with the rank of First Lieutenant of the Reserve.

== Career ==
Müller joined Commerzbank as an employee in 1966. He worked in the bank's Düsseldorf branch from 1966 to 1968 before moving to the New York branch, where he worked from 1968 to 1973. In 1973, the bank appointed him manager of the Düsseldorf branch and from 1977 to 1982, he took on the role of co-manager of the Duisburg branch. He then went on to work as the co-manager of the branch in New York from 1982 to 1986. In 1987, Müller was appointed as the chief representative and head of the core division for corporate clients in Frankfurt. He worked in this position until February 1990, when he took on the role of head of the central division for rebuilding former East Germany.

Müller became a member of the Commerzbank board of managing directors on 1 November 1990, and was made the spokesman of the board on 25 May 2001. He moved to the supervisory board on 15 May 2008 and was replaced by Martin Blessing as chairman of the board of managing directors.

On 17 January 2007 Müller was awarded the title of honorary professor by the Frankfurt School of Finance & Management. At the award ceremony, the former president Roman Herzog gave a speech in his honor. In the same year, Klaus-Peter Müller and major general Wolf Langheld, Commander of the First Armoured Division in Hanover, hosted the first Celler Trialog forum calling for an intensification of cooperation between business, politics and Germany's armed forces. The patron of the event was the former minister-president of Lower Saxony, Christian Wulff.

Müller is committed to upholding the principles of the social market economy. In 2008, Müller succeeded Gerhard Cromme in the role of chairman of the government commission for the German Corporate Governance Code, also known as the Commission for Good Corporate Governance, which was established by the German Federal Ministry of Justice in September 2001. At the time, the commission had recently explored the issue of management board compensation in listed public companies and subsequently proposed both the limitation of salaries and more transparency in the disclosure of management board compensation figures. In spring 2013, Müller announced that he would be stepping down as chairman of the commission.

In April 2015, the German Federal Ministry of Defence assigned Müller the task of managing a group of experts that had been given the job of "searching for weaknesses in the organisational structure of the ministry and the Bundeswehr" in response to criticism of the G36 assault rifle, stating that his expertise qualified him for the role.

== Memberships (selection) ==
=== Corporate boards ===
- Fresenius, Member of the Supervisory Board (2008–2021)
- KfW, Member of the Board of Supervisory Directors (–2009)

=== Non-profit organizations ===
- Association of German Banks, President (2005–2009)
- Frankfurt School of Finance & Management, Honorary Chairman of the Board of Trustees
- Trilateral Commission, Member of the European Group
- Commerzbank Foundation, Chairman of the Board of Trustees
- DFL Foundation, Deputy Chairman of the Board of Trustees (since 2010)
- hr-Sinfonieorchester, Member of the Board of Trustees
- Konrad Adenauer Foundation (KAS), Member of the Board of Trustees
- Senckenberg Nature Research Society, Member of the Board of Trustees
- Stifterverband für die Deutsche Wissenschaft, Member of the Board of Trustees

== Awards ==
- 2004: Honorary doctorate from the Financial University under the Government of the Russian Federation
- 2005: Bundeswehr Gold Cross of Honour in recognition of achievements such as his commitment towards improving interaction between management figures in the armed forces and the world of business 2007: Honorary Professor of the Frankfurt School of Finance & Management
- 2008: Ludwig Erhard Medal in gold from the Economic Council of the Christian Democratic Union
- 2008: Honorary member of the Prinzenclub Düsseldorf carnival association
- 2011: Great Cross of Merit of the Federal Republic of Germany (Großes Bundesverdienstkreuz)
- 2018: Hessian Order of Merit
- 2018: Honorary member of the Heimatverein Düsseldorfer Jonges

== Criticism ==
In 2006, under the management of Klaus-Peter Müller, Commerzbank acquired the shares of Deutsche Bank and Allianz (Dresdner Bank) in the largest European real estate and public finance bank at the time, Eurohypo. In 2009, Commerzbank took over Dresdner Bank under Müller's supervision. Due to both of these acquisitions and the 2008 financial crisis, Commerzbank was in financial trouble and had to request a bailout from the German Financial Market Stabilization Fund. Despite this, Klaus-Peter Müller still believes that the acquisition of Dresdner Bank was the right move; only the timing proved to be "unlucky" in retrospect.
