= Christian Clausen =

Danish banker (born 1955)

- Born: Christian Clausen; March 6, 1955 (age 71); Copenhagen, Denmark
- Education: MA, Economics, University of Copenhagen
- Occupations: Chief executive officer of Nordea (2007–2015); Vice president of Nordea (2001–2007); CEO of Unibank (1996–2001)
- Successor: Casper von Koskull

Christian Clausen (born 6 March 1955) is a Danish banker, and the former CEO of Nordea Bank, a role he had from 2007 to October 2015. He is the chairman and director of the European Banking Federation and the Swedish Bankers’ Association.

== Early life ==
Clausen was born in Copenhagen in 1955. He went on to study at the University of Copenhagen where he earned a Master of Economics qualification.

== Career ==
Clausen began his career in 1975 with a four-year stint at United Credit Unions before moving on to become the executive secretary of Henriques Bank. In 1982, he was appointed as the deputy of Andelsbanken, where he stayed until 1987. Following this role, he joined Privatborsen as its managing director before joining Unibors Securities later in 1990.

In 1996, he joined Unibank as the firm’s CEO leaving in 2001 when he became the executive vice president of Nordea Bank. He was promoted to the CEO position in 2007. In 2012, he was appointed as the chairman and director of the European Banking Federation.
