= Société Générale =

French multinational banking and financial services company

Société Générale S.A.

- Tours Société Générale, the company's headquarters in La Défense near Paris
- Type: Public
- Traded as: Euronext Paris: GLE; CAC 40 component
- Industry: Financial services
- Founded: 4 May 1864; 162 years ago
- Headquarters: Tours Société Générale, La Défense, Nanterre (Operational headquarters); 29 Boulevard Haussmann, 9th arrondissement, Paris (Office hub)
- Area served: Worldwide
- Key people: Lorenzo Bini Smaghi (chairman); Slawomir Krupa (CEO)
- Products: Asset management; Banking; Commodities; Credit cards; Equities trading; Insurance; Investment management; Mortgage loans; Private equity; Wealth management
- Revenue: ▲€27.3 billion (2025)
- Operating income: ▲€8.44 billion (2025)
- Net income: ▲€6.00 billion (2025)
- Total assets: ▼€1.55 trillion (2025)
- Total equity: ▼€79.5 billion (2025)
- Number of employees: 119,000 (2025)
- Subsidiaries: See § Affiliates
- Website: societegenerale.com

Société Générale S.A. (French: [sɔsjete ʒeneʁal]), colloquially known in English-speaking countries as SocGen (pronounced [sɔk ʒɛn]), is a French multinational universal bank and financial services company founded in 1864. It is registered in downtown Paris and headquartered nearby in La Défense.

Société Générale is France's third largest bank by total assets after BNP Paribas and Crédit Agricole. According to S&P Global's April 2026 report, it is Europe's seventh largest bank by assets, with $1.813 trillion in assets. It is considered to be a systemically important bank by the Financial Stability Board. It has been designated as a Significant Institution since the entry into force of European Banking Supervision in late 2014, and as a consequence is directly supervised by the European Central Bank.

From 1966 to 2003 it was known as one of the Trois Vieilles ("Old Three") major French commercial banks, along with Banque Nationale de Paris (from 2000 BNP Paribas) and Crédit Lyonnais.

== History ==
=== 19th century ===
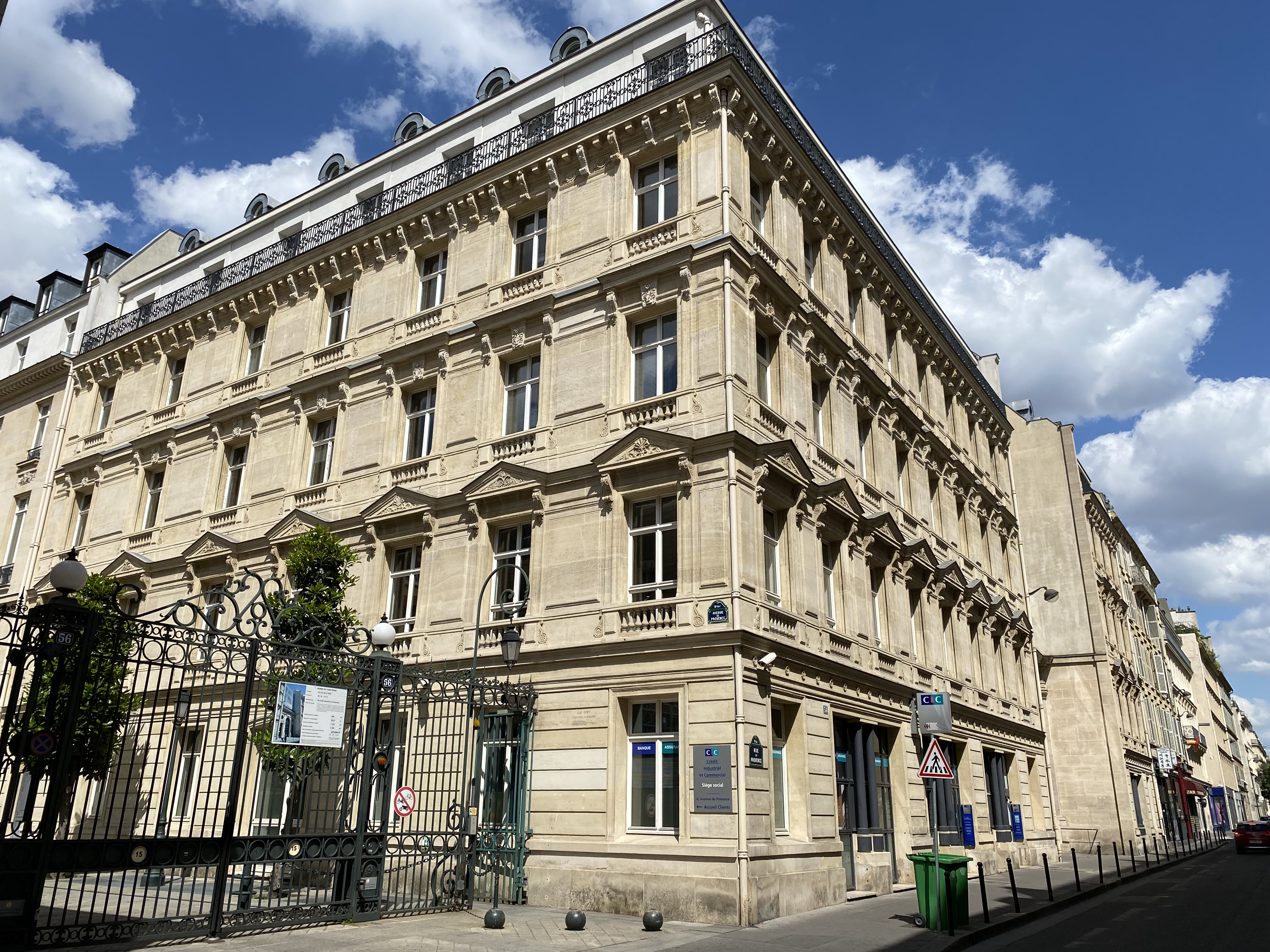
First headquarters built by Société Générale at 56, rue de Provence in Paris

The bank was founded by a group of industrialists and financiers during the Second Empire on 4 May 1864. Its full name was Société Générale pour favoriser le développement du commerce et de l'industrie en France ("General Company to Support the Development of Commerce and Industry in France"). The bank's first chairman was the prominent industrialist Eugène Schneider, followed by Edward Charles Blount. By 1870, the bank had 47 branches throughout France, including 15 in Paris. It set up a permanent office in London in 1871.

At the beginning, the bank used its own resources almost entirely for both financial and banking operations. In 1871, Société Générale moved into the public French issues market with a national debenture loan launched to cover the war indemnity stipulated in the Treaty of Frankfurt.

The bank was financially involved with some of the businesses created by Paulin Talabot, the railway and canal engineer. Talabot came to have an influential role in the bank.

In 1886, Société Générale was part of the bank consortium (along with the Franco-Egyptian Bank and the Crédit Industriel et Commercial) that financed the construction of the Eiffel Tower.

From 1871 to 1893, France went through a period of economic gloom marked by the failure of several banking establishments. The company continued to grow at a more moderate pace. In 1889, there were 148 banking outlets, demonstrating the group's capacity to withstand unfavourable economic conditions.

Starting in 1894, the bank set up the structures characterising a large, modern credit institution. As well as collecting company and private deposits, its branches started to provide short-term operating credits for industrialists and traders. It also moved into placing shares with the general public, issuing private debenture loans in France and also in Russia. Acquisition of equity stakes became a more secondary activity. The company's excellent financial health allowed it to expand its shareholding structure. In 1895, Société Générale had 14,000 shareholders.

In 1898, Société Générale entered the Belgian market. Because the Société Générale de Belgique predated its French namesake and had a dominant position in the national market, Société Générale agreed to create a bank with a different name, the Société Française de Banque et de Dépôts headquartered in Paris but entirely dedicated to operations in Belgium. The bank had its Brussels office from 1898 in the prestigious Hôtel de Ligne on Rue Royale, and also maintained a branch in Antwerp, at No.72-76 of Meir.

=== 20th century ===
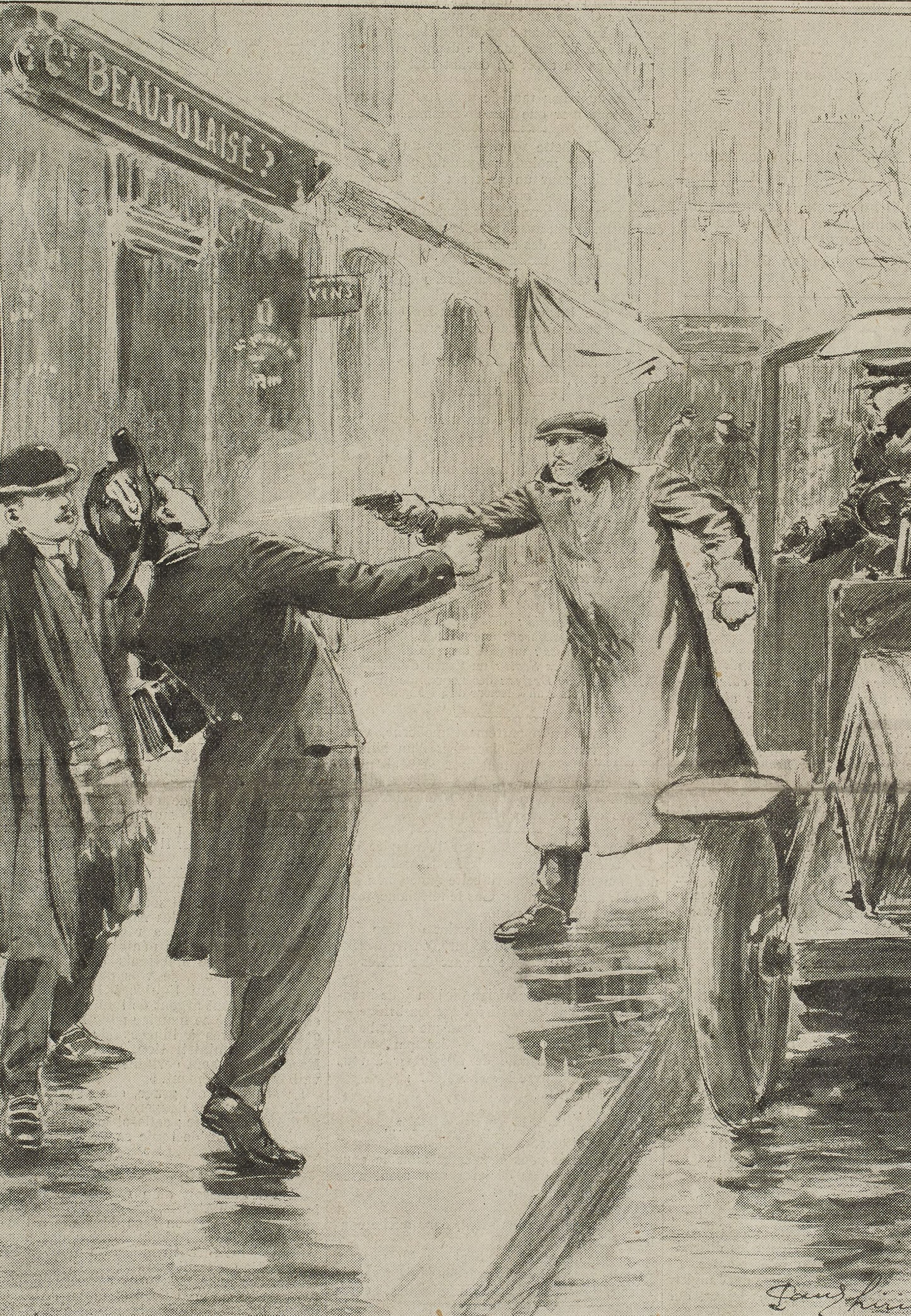
Representation of the Ordener attack in L'Excelsior on 22 December 1911, the first motorized armed robbery in history, by the illegalist anarchist Bonnot Gang

On 21 December 1911, the illegalist anarchist Bonnot Gang attacked Ernest Caby, a Société Générale courier responsible for transporting daily funds to the rue Ordener agency in Paris. In search of money, Raymond Callemin and Octave Garnier shot him down, stole the money he was carrying, and then fled with Jules Bonnot in a stolen luxury car. This attack, known as the Ordener attack, was the gang's first robbery and the first motorized bank heist in history.

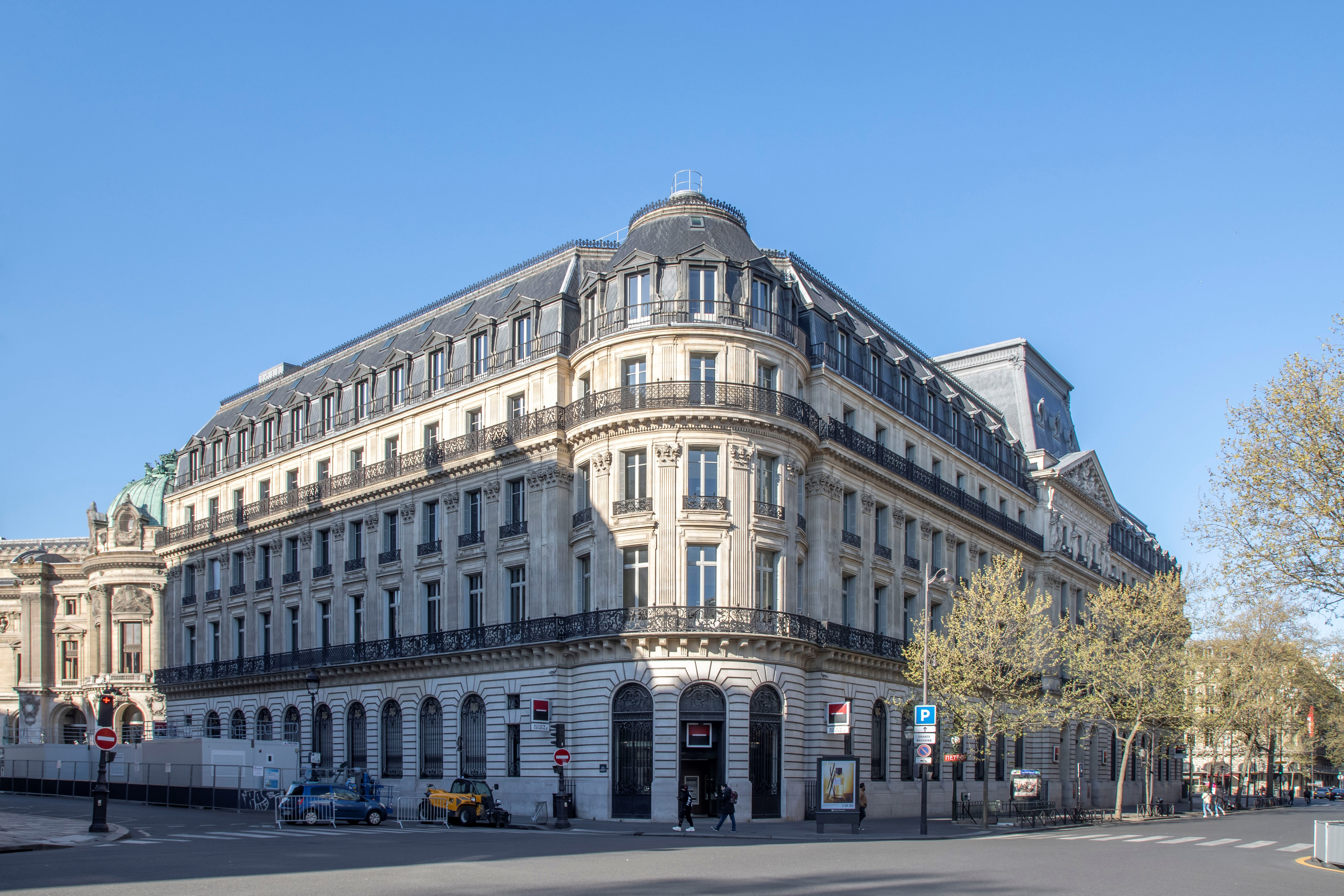
The city block of 29, boulevard Haussmann, remodeled by Société Générale between 1906 and 1912 and its registered office since 1915

By 1913, Société Générale had 122,000 shareholders. The war years were difficult and had serious consequences with the loss of Russian business. However, during the 1920s Société Générale became France's leading bank: its network had grown sharply since the 1890s, with a huge number of branches and seasonal offices allowing in-depth penetration of the provincial market (260 seasonal offices in 1910 and 864 in 1930).

The number of sales outlets rose from 1,005 in 1913 to 1,457 in 1933 (including those operated by the minority-held Société Générale Alsacienne de Banque). Thanks also to the dynamism of supervisory and management staff at head office and in the branch offices it moved ahead of Crédit Lyonnais (in terms of deposits collected and loans distributed) between 1921 and 1928. To satisfy the requirements of investing companies, Société Générale created a subsidiary, Calif, specialised in medium-term credit in 1928.

On an international level, the bank held an active participation in the Russo-Asian Bank, one of the leading bank of the Russian empire. Société Générale first settled in Russia through the Severnyi bank in 1901, before merging with the Russo-Asian bank in 1910, which held a majority stake in the Chinese Eastern Railway. It also invested in Russian industry including such companies as the Rutchenko Coal Company and the Makeevka Steel Company. Thanks to the connections of Talabot they were also involved in the Krivoi-Rog Iron Company.

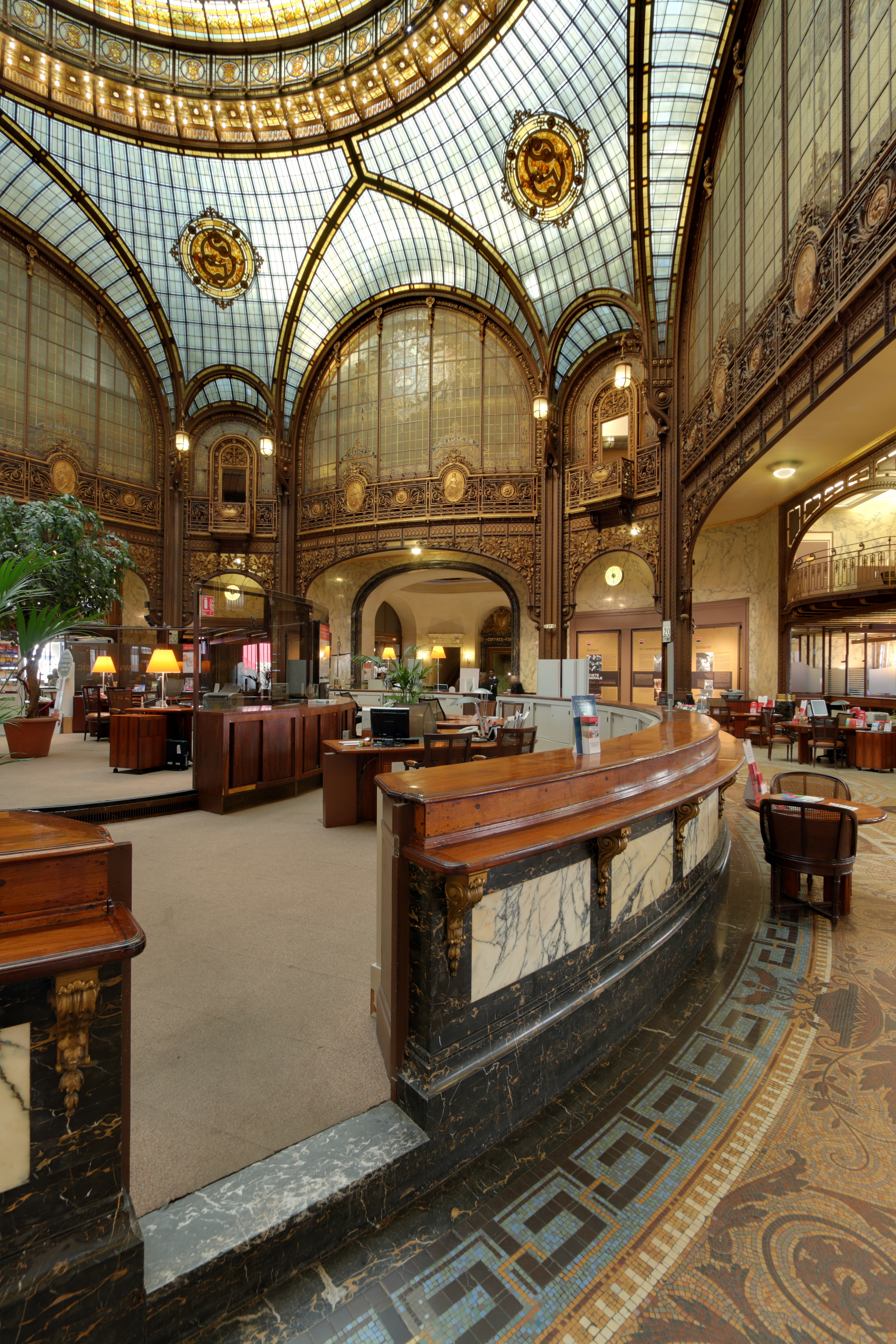
Atrium of the Siège central de la Société Générale inaugurated in 1912

The 1930s were another difficult period. Given the decline in international and French business, the bank was forced to nationalise its network by closing down local branches. On the eve of World War II, the number of sales outlets was not much greater than in 1922. However, Société Générale was active in placing numerous public loans launched during this period by the State or the colonies. The war and the German Occupation interrupted its advance, but the bank moved into Africa and the United States.

Société Générale was nationalised in 1945. It now had a single shareholder: the State. The period from 1945 to 1958 was characterised in France by rapid economic recovery but also a greater disequilibrium in the balance of payments, calling for continued exchange controls and virtually permanent credit control measures. It was not until 1959 that the economy really recovered, but credit controls were reinforced due to persistent inflationary pressures. Sharp growth in production and foreign trade opened up new areas of business for the banks.

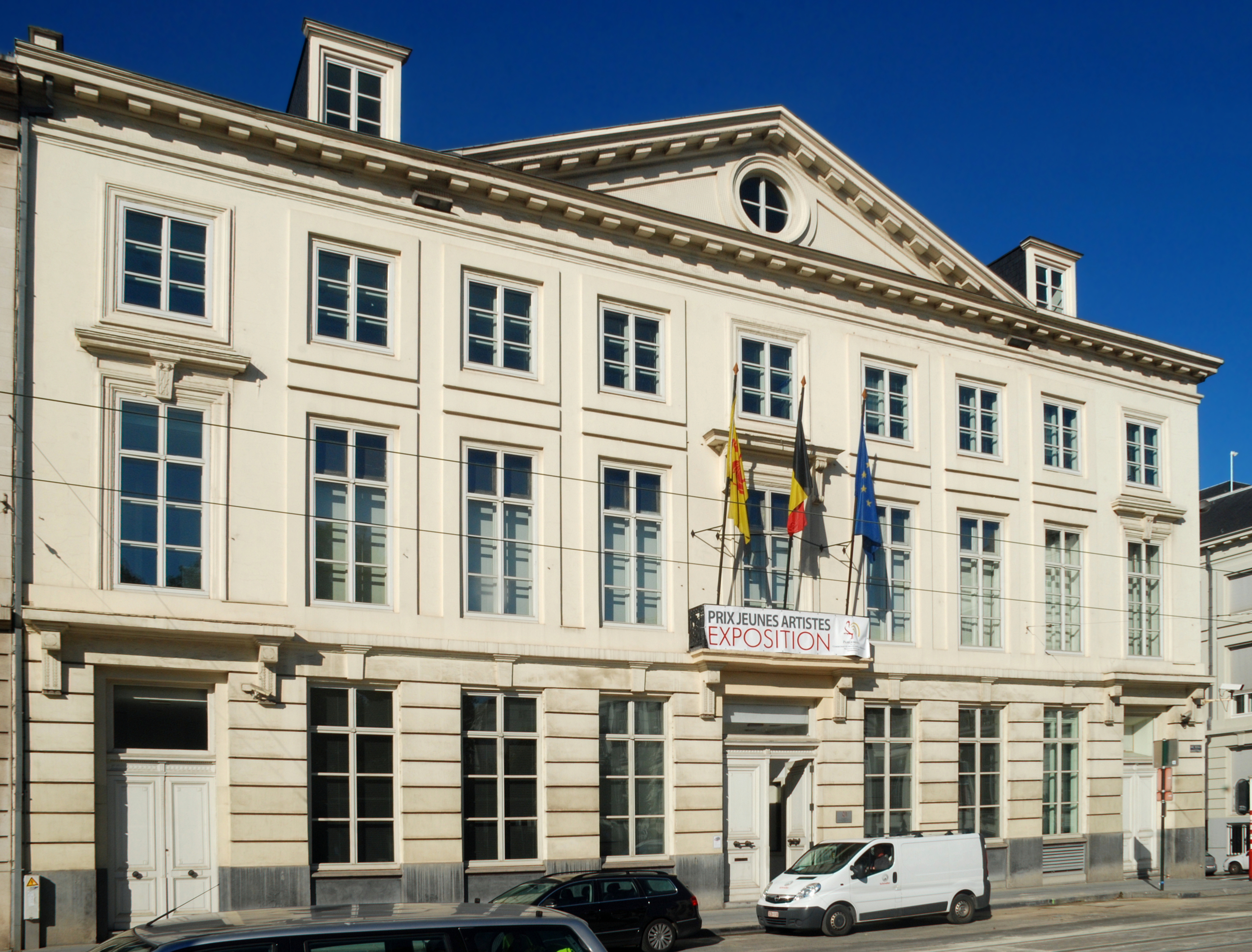
Hôtel de Ligne on Rue Royale, Brussels, seat of the Société Française de Banque et de Dépôts, then local office of Société Générale until the late 20th century

The industry underwent some quite radical changes, one of the most striking of which was much greater specialisation of credit. The range of banking services on offer expanded uninterruptedly. Thanks to its presence in New York City, Société Générale was able to take advantage of the flow of business generated by the Marshall Plan.

Société Générale continued to expand in France and beyond. It moved into Italy and Mexico and altered the status of its establishments in Africa after decolonisation, in accordance with the laws passed by these newly independent countries.

From the mid-1960s, Société Générale gave new impetus to its French network, with an acceleration in growth after 1966 following elimination of prior authorisation for opening branch offices. International expansion was just as vigorous. It was no longer limited, as before, to the main financial centres (London, New York), neighbouring countries (Belgium, Spain) and the former colonies, with the primary aim of facilitating the business of French firms, but was also aimed at guaranteeing the bank's presence where new markets were developing, either to export the technical expertise it had acquired in certain fields, or to keep up its contact with the multi-nationals.

1966 and 1967 represented a fundamental turning point in banking regulations, the main development being attenuation of the distinction between deposit and investment banking, and creation of the home mortgage market. Société Générale took advantage of this and acquired leading positions in some new financing techniques designed primarily for companies, such as finance leasing, setting up specialised credit subsidiaries for this purpose.

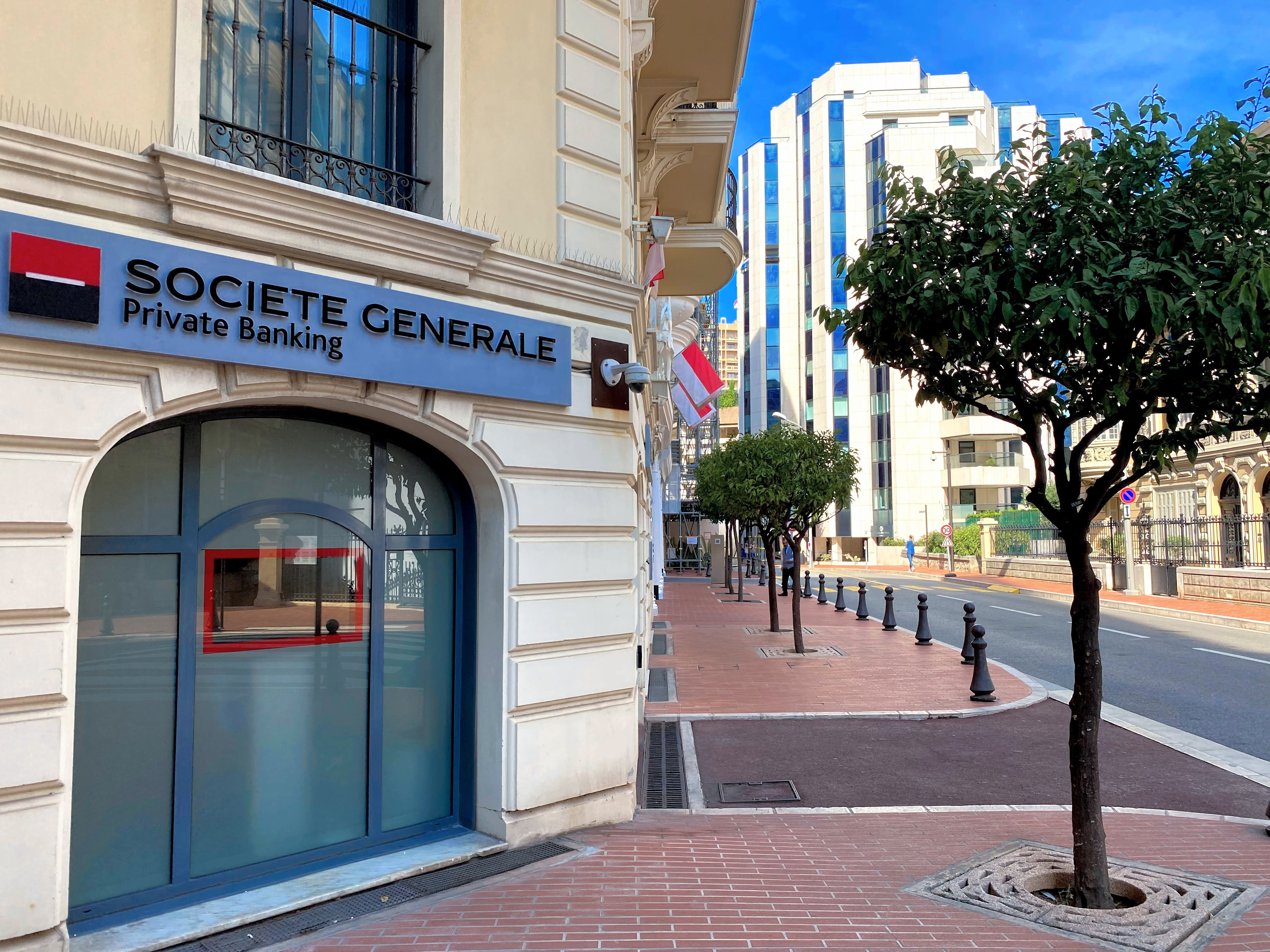
An SG Private Banking office in Monte Carlo

The 1970s were characterised by two major developments: expansion of the international network and across-the-board introduction of IT facilities to cope with extension of the customer base and the development of deposit money. In 1971, the appearance of automatic cash machines crowned the success and development of the credit card. In 1973, Société Générale opened its representative office in the Soviet Union.

In 1976, during the Bastille Day holiday, a meticulously planned robbery was carried out against Société Générale's most heavily fortified vault in France by ex-paratrooper and wedding photographer Albert Spaggiari. The robbery which involved secretly tunneling underground and compromising the walls of the bank vault netted Spaggiari over 12 million in cash, jewellery, and bullion.

From the beginning of the 1980s, against a backdrop of deregulation and technological change, internationalisation of the markets and the emergence of new financial instruments, Société Générale set itself two commercial objectives. It focused increasingly on private customers via its network of branches and by acquiring specialised subsidiaries. It pursued and expanded its activities in the capital markets in France, and then, on a selective basis, in the different international financial centres. On 29 July 1987 Société Générale was privatised. It had been chosen from among the three leading French commercial banks nationalised in 1945 for its excellent risk-coverage, equity and productivity ratios. George Soros was a share-holder in 1988.

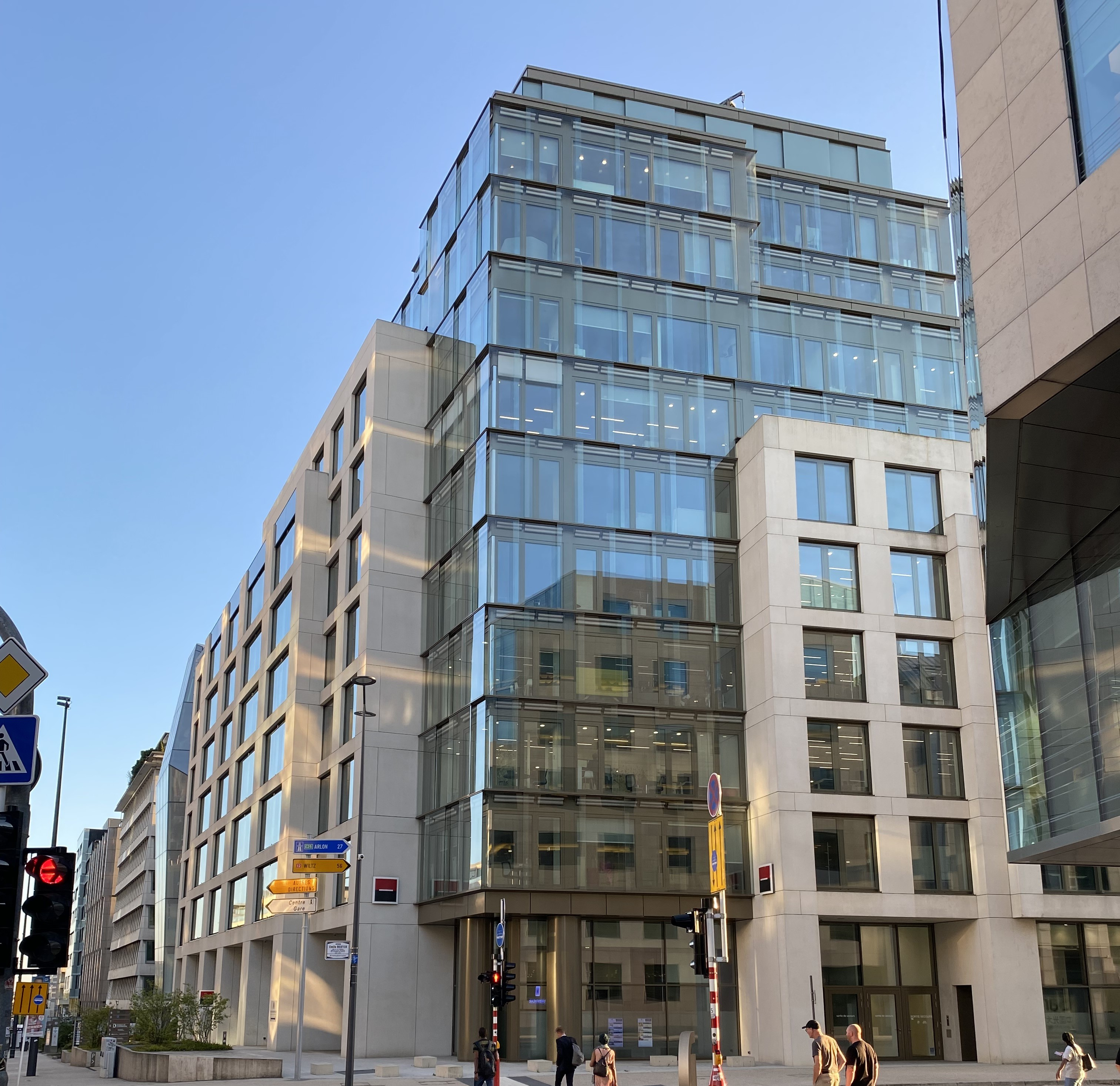
Société Générale building on Boulevard Royal, Luxembourg City

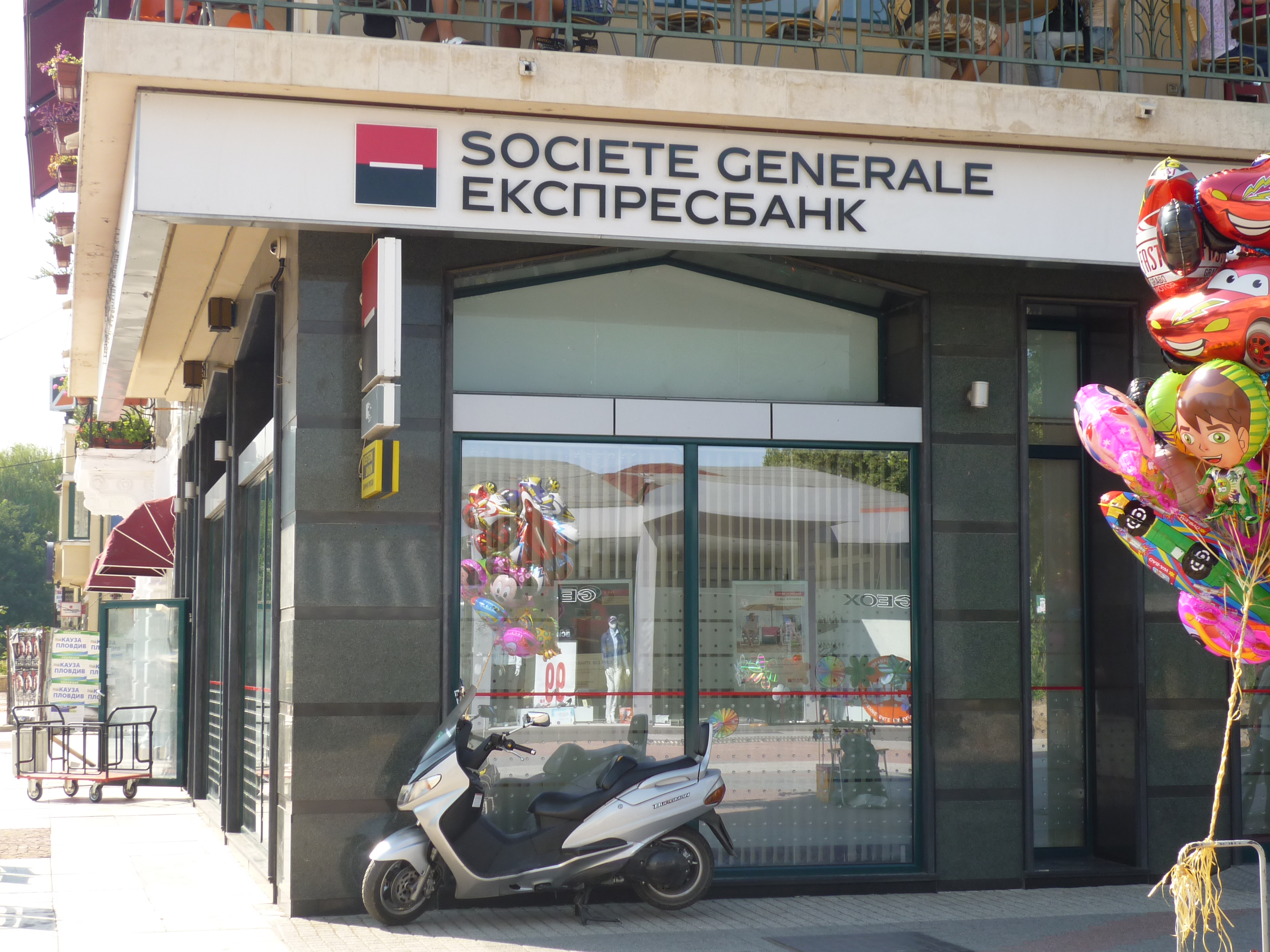
A Société Générale Expresbank office in Plovdiv, Bulgaria

In 1986, Société Générale created Fimat International Banque S.A., a global brokerage, offering a range of clearing and execution services on listed or OTC derivatives and cash products. In 2005, Fimat completed the acquisition of Cube Financial. In January 2008, it merged with Calyon Financial to form Newedge; in 2014, SG purchased Credit Agricole's stake.

In subsequent years, the Société Générale Group has focused on developing its activities around three core businesses through a combination of organic growth and acquisitions.

In the early 1990s, the Senegalese subsidiary of Société Générale teamed up with the Swiss processed-foods manufacturer Nestlé to illegally dispossess the real estate assets of the Industrial Company of Dairy Products (SIPL), thus leading the dairy company to bankruptcy.

Retail Banking was strengthened in 1997 through the acquisition of Crédit du Nord, highlighting the Group's determination to capitalise on the restructuring of the French banking system. At the same time, Société Générale looked to secure the long-term loyalty of its customers (launch of "one account number for life" and introduction of Jazz, a package of service offers). In 1999 it entered into a merger agreement with rival bank Paribas, but this was scuppered by a competitor, the Banque Nationale de Paris (BNP).

In 1998 Société Générale paid $540 million in cash to acquire Cowen & Company, a New York investment bank that specialized in the health care, technology and communications industries. Cowen was taken over by the Societe Generale Securities Corporation, the French bank's New York investment bank, and renamed the SG Cowen Securities Corporation. Joseph M. Cohen, Cowen's chief executive became its chairman, and Curtis R. Welling, an investment banker from Societe Generale's New York office became president and chief executive.

In 1998, Société Générale set up Retail Banking outside France as a separate division, underscoring the Group's resolve to make this business one of its strategic development axes. This activity was also strengthened in 1999 through the acquisitions made in Romania (BRD – Groupe Société Générale), Bulgaria (Société Générale Expresbank) and Madagascar.

=== 21st century ===
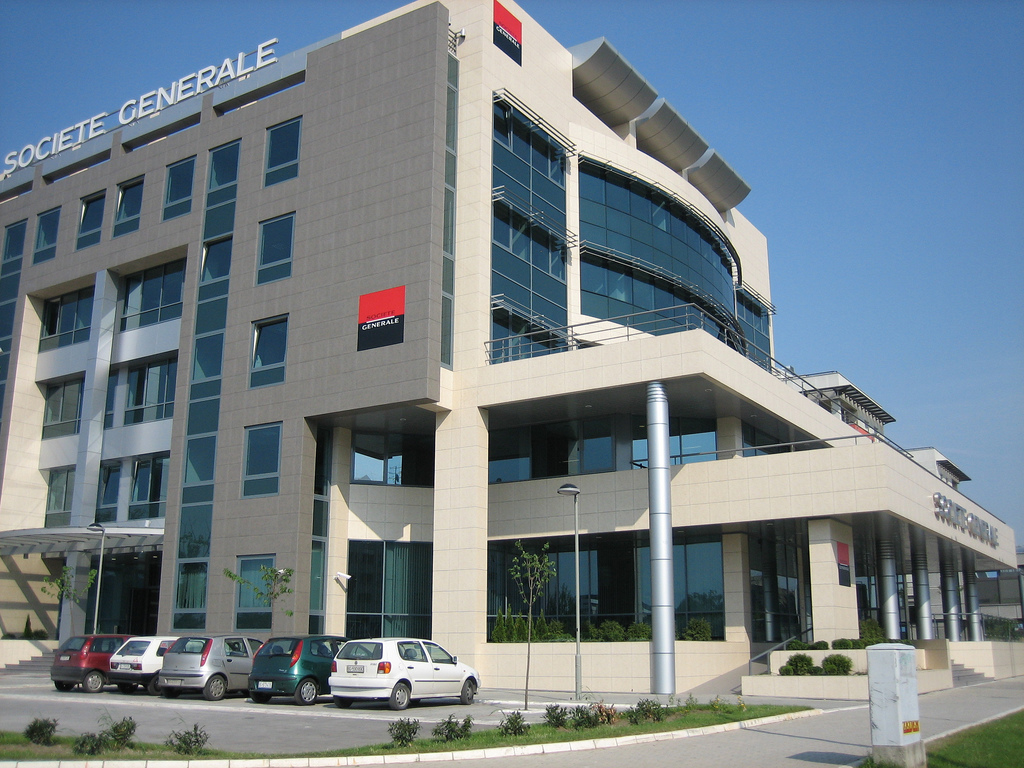
Former Société Générale Serbia head office in New Belgrade, 2008

In the early years of the 21st century, Société Générale's external growth strategy has been manifested through acquisitions in Central Europe (Komerční Banka in the Czech Republic and SKB Banka in Slovenia) in 2001. Investment banking at Societe Generale in Russia was run by Jacques Der Megreditchian until 2000 At that time, Société Générale became officially concerned with money laundering scandal and underground economy.

In 2001, Société Générale acquired a controlling interest in the TCW Group. The TCW Group, which was founded in 1971, was originally known as Trust Company of the West and is the parent of TCW/Crescent Mezzanine one of the leading mezzanine capital firms in the US. The TCW Group operated as a subsidiary of Société Générale Asset Management until it was sold to Carlyle Group.

Africa is also a major area of interest for the bank, with the 2002 purchase of 44,42 % of Eqdom in Morocco (the market leader in consumer lending) and Union Internationale de Banques in Tunisia. In addition, 51 percent of SSB Bank in Ghana in 2003 and 50 percent of Geniki Bank in Greece in 2004 were acquired . In terms of specialized financial services, a department created in mid-2001, the purchase of two Deutsche Bank subsidiaries, ALD Automotive for multi-brand auto leasing and financing and GEFA for corporate sales financing enabled Société Générale to increase its European presence in these sectors. In 2002, it continued to pursue its external growth strategy by purchasing Hertz Lease, a European subsidiary specializing in long-term leasing and fleet management for Ford Motor Company vehicles.

With a track record as leader in France for financial savings products (mutual funds, investment funds, company savings plans), the Group has developed its Asset Management and Private Banking activities: in 1999, its subsidiary, Société Générale Asset Management, pursued the strategy of developing both its mutual fund management business in France and its activities aimed at major institutional investors at an international level. With the launch of Société Générale AM UK in London and the acquisition of Yamaichi in Japan, Société Générale Asset Management has taken a decisive step in establishing its international presence and is now able to offer its customers truly global fund management capabilities. Société Générale also has a worldwide presence in private banking activities. After pursuing a deliberate policy of acquisitions in 1998, Société Générale Private Banking consolidated and developed its franchise in 1999 against a backdrop of intense competition.

During the 1st quarter 2004, the third branch of activity of the Société Générale Group, GIMS Global Investment Management and Services was created. In February 2004, Société Générale set up a new division named SG GSSI, Global Securities Services for Investors, which provides investor services on securities and derivatives, attached to the GIMS which regroups SG Asset Management, SG Private Banking and SG Global Securities Services for Investors. GIMS employed 7,600 people.

In 2005, the Société Générale acquired DeltaCredit, the largest mortgage bank in Russia, from The U.S. Russia Investment Fund for $100 million.

The Société Générale developed its Corporate and Investment Banking businesses under the SG CIB brand name, introduced in 1998, which as of 2014, is subsumed by SG SS. Société Générale was looking to develop its M&A, advisory and IPO activities through the acquisition of specialized firms (SG Hambros in the United Kingdom, Barr Devlin in the United States).

Following two years of crisis resulting from the revelation of the Kerviel fraud and then from the eruption of the 2008 financial crisis, the bank appeared to have put things behind it in 2010.

In business terms, Société Générale appeared intent on moving on and implementing an in-depth transformation in 2010. On 15 June, the Bank presented its Ambition SG 2015 programme to investors, the aim of this programme being to "deliver growth with lower risk" by 2015, using the lessons learned from the crisis.

In 2010, the company saw an upturn in its financial results. Over the first half, the Group recorded net income of €2.15 billion. These good figures were presented shortly after the publication of the results of the stress tests of 91 European banks, results that confirmed the financial solidity of the main four French banks, including Société Générale.

During the summer of 2011, the financial markets, fearing the collapse of the eurozone associated with the European sovereign debt crisis, were severely shaken. European and French bank shares recorded substantial falls. It was within this context that Britain's Mail on Sunday published, on Sunday 7 August, an article in which it announced Société Générale's imminent bankruptcy. The newspaper quickly published a retraction and its apologies but, despite that, the rumour gathered pace, notably on social networks, resulting in a spectacular fall in Société Générale's share price and in bearish speculation. Société Générale successfully filed a suit in the UK against Associated Newspapers (the Mail on Sunday's parent company) for "substantial damage to its reputation and prejudice to its trade".

Bearish pressure, influenced by speculation but also by investor suspicion, continued to affect Société Générale's share price through to the end of 2011. For example, on the single day of 10 August 2011, Société Générale saw its share price lose 22%.

In June 2020, Société Générale reacquired the bank Shine.

In August 2020, it was reported that Société Générale experienced a €1.26 billion loss during the second fiscal quarter of 2020. It was the bank's weakest quarterly performance since 2008's Kerviel Fraud. As a result of this, Séverin Cabannes, the bank's global banking and investor solutions business head, is set to retire in 2021 and leave his place by the end of this year. Additionally, Philippe Heim, who serves as the head of international retail banking, financial services, and insurance, will also vacate his position as deputy chief executive immediately. In December 2013, the European Commission fined the bank close to 446 million Euro for its role in the LIBOR scandal regarding interest rate derivatives. In April 2016, the fine was reduced to approximately €228 million.

In December 2021, Amundi finalized its acquisition of Lyxor Asset Management from Société Générale. Lyxor was an investment company based in France, and a wholly owned subsidiary of Société Générale. It offered exchanged-traded index funds and other ETFs, exchanged-traded notes (ETN), and several other products to private and corporate investors.

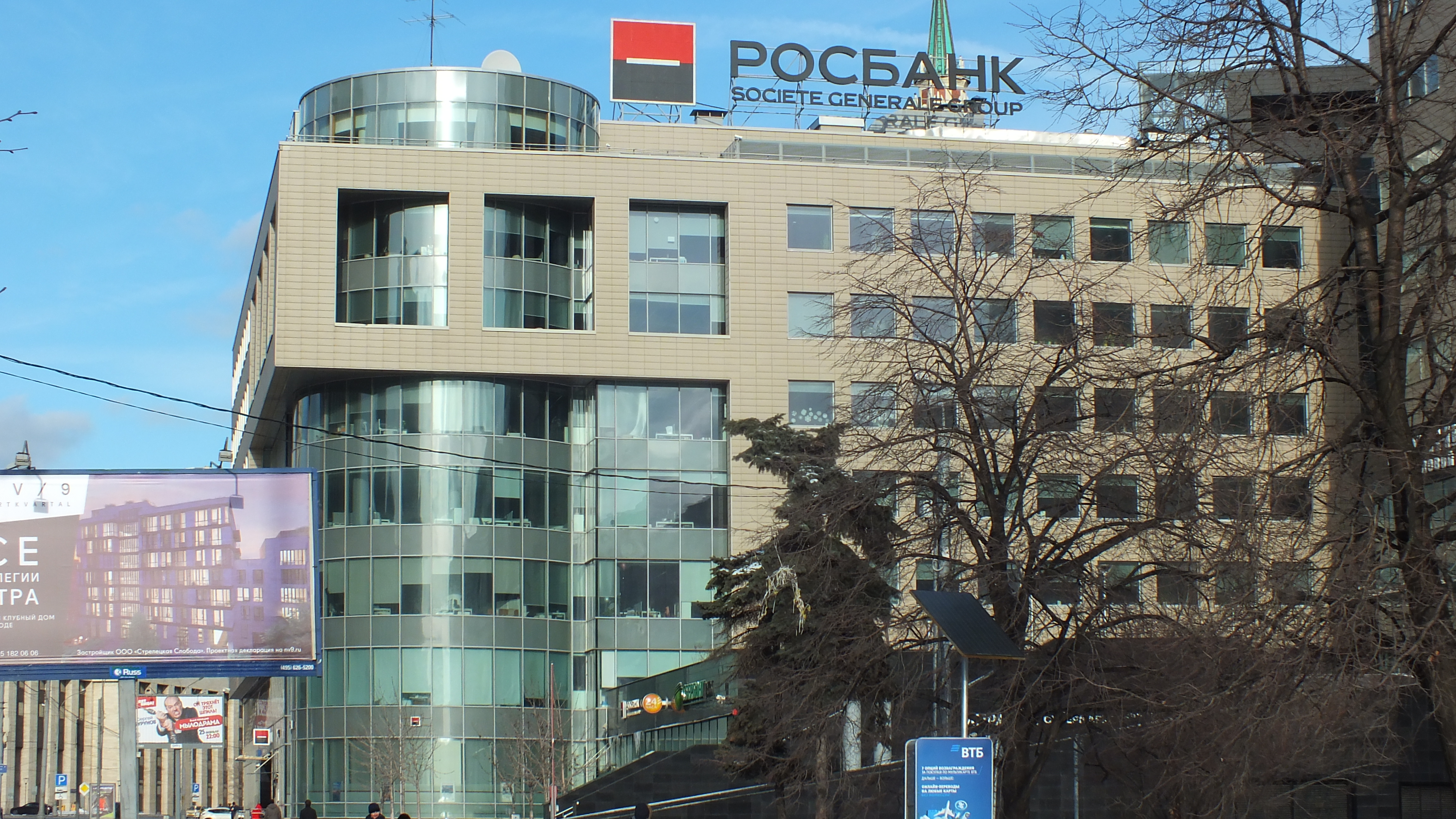
Rosbank head office in Moscow with the Société Générale logo, 2019

In April 2022, Société Générale became the first major financial group to leave Russian market because of International sanctions during the Russo-Ukrainian War.

In May 2022, Société Générale announced the closing of the sale of Rosbank and the Group's Russian insurance subsidiaries to Interros Capital. This transaction results for Société Générale in a net loss of around 3.2 billion euros and has an impact of about -7 basis points on its capital ratio.

In March 2025, Alexis Kohler, President Emmanuel Macron's chief of staff, was appointed as executive vice president of Société Générale, effective June 2025. Kohler will oversee M&A, equity capital markets, and acquisition finance activities, and will assist CEO Slawomir Krupa in implementing the bank's transformation programs. On 10 April 2025, Société Générale named William Connelly as its next Chairman, set to take over in May 2026.

== Operations ==
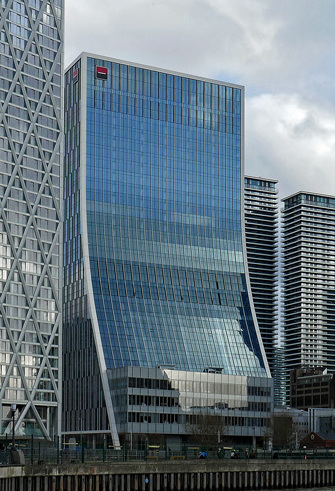
Société Générale building at One Bank Street, Canary Wharf, London, 2020

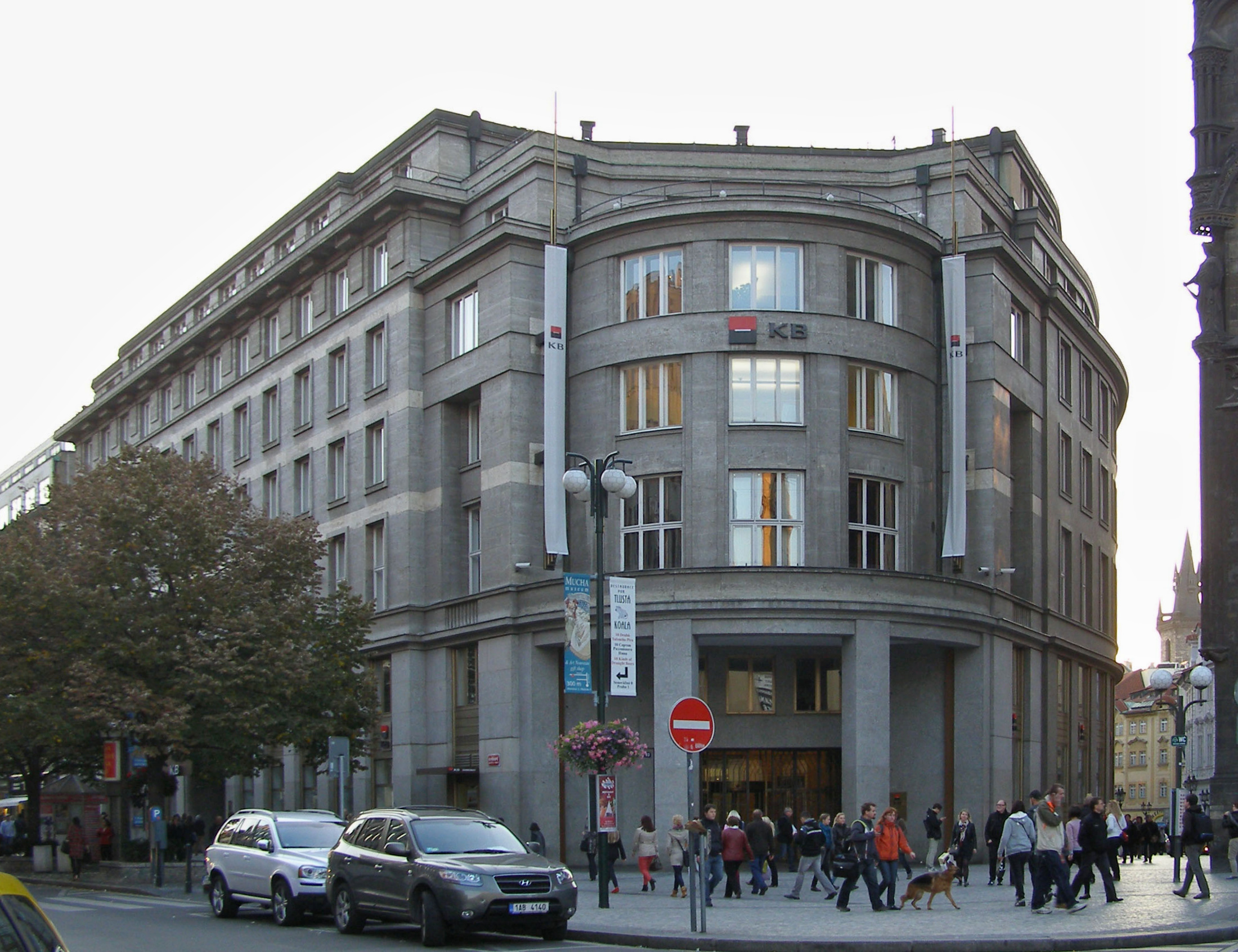
Head office of Komerční banka in Prague, 2012

BRD Tower in Bucharest, 2009

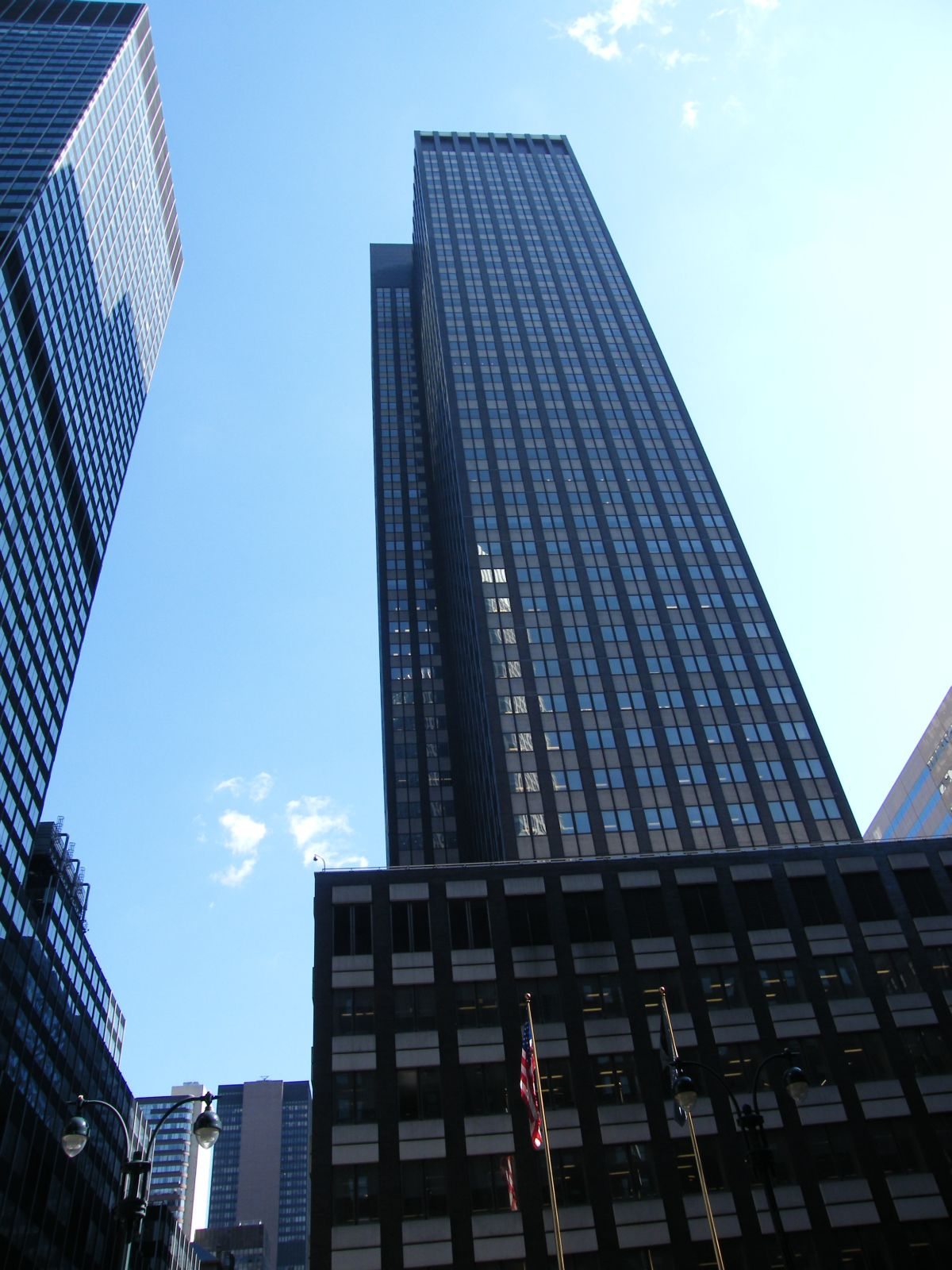
245 Park Avenue, in which Société Générale has its main office in New York City

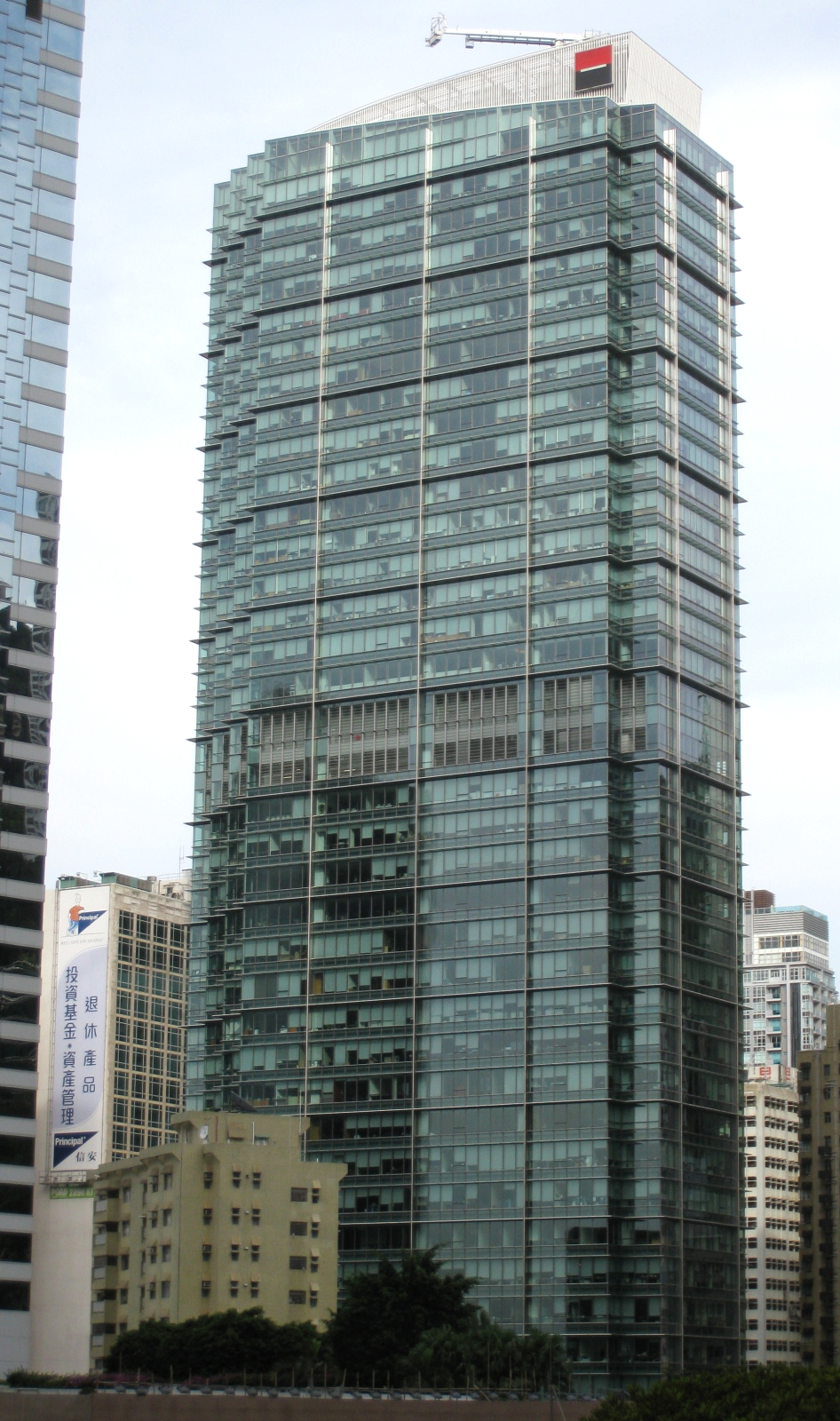
Société Générale logo on Three Pacific Place, Hong Kong, 2014

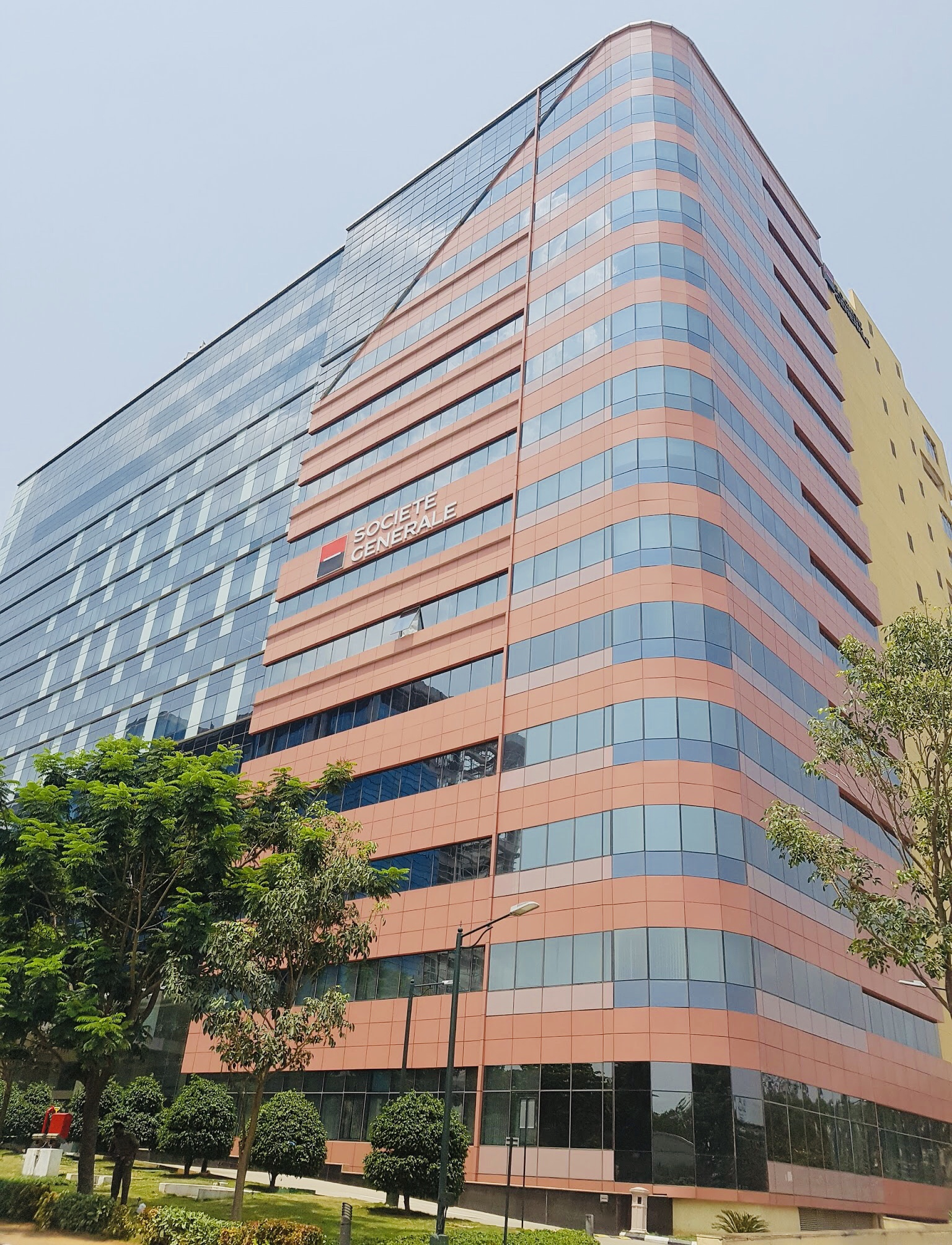
Société Générale Building at Whitefield, Bangalore, 2020

Société Générale is a universal bank. The Group consists of three main pillars backed by two business lines. Société Générale is often nicknamed SocGen (pronounced "sock jenn") in the international financial world.

=== Commercial activity ===
In 2013, Société Générale announced the implementation of a model based on three pillars:

- Retail Banking in France (Société Générale, Crédit du Nord and Boursorama)
- International Banking and Financial Services (IBFS)
- Corporate and Investment Banking (SG CIB), with investment banking and fixed income, structured financing, debt and forex activities on the one side, and equity and consulting activities on the other.

The development of these three pillars is backed by two other core activities, namely:

- Specialised Financial Services & Insurance
- Private Banking, Global Investment Management & Services

=== Subsidiaries ===
- BRD – Groupe Société Générale (Romania)
- Komerční banka (Czech Republic)
- Fiditalia (Italy)
- Banque Deutsches Kraftfahrzeughandel (Germany)
- Société Générale de Banque au Liban (Lebanon)
- Societe Generale Ghana
- Société générale Algérie
- Société générale Côte d'Ivoire
- Société générale Sénégal
- Union internationale de banques

=== Corporate affairs ===
Société Générale's head office is in the Tours Société Générale in the business district of La Défense in the city of Nanterre, west of Paris. The company moved there in June 1995 from its former head office along Boulevard Haussmann in the 9th arrondissement of Paris. The head office has 7,000 employees. The former head office remains as the company's registered office.

In 2015, Standard Ethics Aei has given a rating to Société Générale in order to include it in its Standard Ethics French Index.

=== Financial indicators ===
	2016	2017	2018	2019	2020	2021	2022	2023	2024	2025
Total revenue (€ bn)	24.3	24.4	24.3	23.4	18.8	25.7	23.1	24.1	25.3	25.8
Net income (€ bn)	3.9	2.8	3.9	3.3	−0.3	5.6	2.0	2.5	4.2	6.0
Total assets (€ bn)	1,382	1,275	1,309	1,356	1,462	1,464	1,487	1,554	1,574	1,547
Total equity (€ bn)	65.7	64.0	65.8	65.6	67.0	70.9	72.8	76.3	79.6	79.5
Employees	131,000	138,000	140,250	129,586	133,251	138,240	133,251	131,293	119,000	110,000

=== Sponsorship ===
The Group has a long-term active and generally very discreet support policy. Its sponsorship of rugby is well-known, but its support in other fields such as music, contemporary art, disabled sport (as an official partner of the Fédération Française Handisport, the French Federation for Disabled Sports) and corporate citizenship, professional integration and disadvantaged children, is less known.

== Leadership ==
- Eugène Schneider, chairman 1864–1869
- Guillaume Denière, chairman 1869–1886
- Edward-Charles Blount, chairman 1886–1901
- Jean Hély d'Oissel, chairman 1902–1915
- André Homberg, chairman 1922–1932
- Joseph Simon, chairman 1932–1940
- Henri Ardant, CEO 1934-1944 and chairman 1941–1944
- Pierre de Moüy, chairman 1944–1958
- Maurice Lorain, CEO 1944-1958 and chairman 1958–1967
- Jacques Ferronnière, CEO 1958-1967 and chairman 1967–1972
- Maurice Lauré, CEO 1967-1982 and chairman 1973–1982
- Jacques Mayoux, chairman & CEO 1982–1986
- Marc Viénot, chairman & CEO 1986–1997
- Daniel Bouton, chairman 1997-2009 and CEO 1997–2008
- Frédéric Oudéa, chairman 2009-2015 and CEO 2008–2023
- Lorenzo Bini Smaghi, chairman since 2015
- Slawomir Krupa, CEO 2023-

== Controversies ==
=== Senegal ===
In the early 1990s, the Senegalese subsidiary of Société Générale teamed up with the Swiss processed-foods manufacturer Nestlé to illegally dispossess the real estate assets of the Industrial Company of Dairy Products (SIPL), thus leading the dairy company to bankruptcy.

=== January 2008 trading loss and Kerviel trial ===
On 24 January 2008 the bank announced that a single futures trader at the bank had fraudulently lost the bank €4.9 billion (an equivalent of US$7.2 billion), the largest such loss in history. The company did not name the trader, but other sources identified him as Jérôme Kerviel, a relatively junior futures trader who allegedly orchestrated a series of bogus transactions that spiraled out of control amid turbulent markets in 2007 and early 2008.

Partly due to the loss, that same day two credit rating agencies reduced the bank's long term debt ratings: from AA to AA− by Fitch; and from Aa1/B to Aa2/B− by Moody's (B and B− indicate the bank's financial strength ratings).

Executives said the trader acted alone and that he may not have benefited directly from the fraudulent deals. The bank announced it will be immediately seeking €5.5 billion in financing. On the eve and afternoon of 25 January 2008, Police raided the Paris headquarters of Société Générale and Kerviel's apartment in the western suburb of Neuilly, to seize his computer files. French presidential aide Raymond Soubie stated that Kerviel dealt with $73.3 billion (more than the bank's market capitalization of $52.6 billion). Three union officials of Société Générale employees said Kerviel had family problems. On 26 January 2008 the Paris prosecutors' office stated that Jerome Kerviel, 31, in Paris, "is not on the run. He will be questioned at the appropriate time, as soon as the police have analysed documents provided by Société Générale." Spiegel Online stated that Kerviel may have lost 2.8 billion dollars on 140,000 contracts earlier negotiated due to DAX falling 600 points.

Société Générale SA says it had a net loss in the fourth quarter of 2007 after the French bank took a €4.9 billion ($7.18 billion) hit closing the unauthorized trading positions of Jérôme Kerviel.

The trial of Jérôme Kerviel began on 8 June 2010 at the Paris Palais de Justice, and lasted until 25 June. Société Générale filed the civil suit. The former Société Générale trader was represented by Olivier Metzner, and the Bank was represented by Jean Veil, Jean Reinhart and François Martineau. The trial aroused much media interest, with a record number of requests for accreditation from journalists. Following more than two weeks of highly technical debate with much focus on Jérôme Kerviel's character, the State Prosecutor called for the former trader to be given a five-year prison sentence, two of them suspended, whilst Kerviel's lawyer called for his client to be acquitted. The ruling was announced on 5 October 2010 at 11 am. Jérôme Kerviel was found guilty of the three charges filed against him: breach of trust, fraudulent inputting of data into an IT system and forgery and use of forged documents. He was found to be solely responsible for the record loss suffered by Société Générale in early 2008, and was sentenced to five years in prison, with two of those years suspended, and ordered to pay damages of €4.9 billion to the Bank.

Jérôme Kerviel immediately launched an appeal on the basis of an "unreasonable decision", according to his lawyer Olivier Metzner. Kerviel's sentence has therefore been suspended until the appeal, which is due to take place between 4 and 28 June 2012, and he is presumed innocent until that time. The huge amount of damages Kerviel was ordered to pay gave rise to much emotion amongst the general public and online. The sentencing of one man to pay such a large sum of money was met with incomprehension and anger amongst Internet users. The Bank announced that the sum was "symbolic" and it had no expectation that the sum would be paid by Jérôme Kerviel.

=== March 2008: Missing consignment of gold by Goldaş ===
On 21 March 2008 Société Générale filed suit in Istanbul Commercial Court against Goldaş, a Turkish Jewelry firm, claiming the company had not paid for 15 tonnes(15,000 kg) of gold it had received through a consignment agreement. Goldaş stated that the consignment agreement was only for 3,250 kg of gold with a value of US$94 million. In June 2008, the court found Goldaş not guilty.

=== March 2009: Potential loss of $11 billion averted due to US government bailout of AIG ===
On 15 March 2009 AIG disclosed that, among its counterparties, Société Générale was to date the largest recipient of both credit default swap (CDS) collateral postings ($4.1 bn) and CDS payments ($6.9 bn), payments made possible in part by the 2008 U.S. government bailout of AIG.

=== Clearstream ===
French reporter Denis Robert and former No. 3 of Cedel Ernest Backes, a whistleblower of Clearstream have accused Société Générale of having non-published accounts in Clearstream, which was at the centre of a financial scandal in 2009.

=== Check processing fees ===
In 2010 the French government's Autorité de la concurrence (the department in charge of regulating competition) fined eleven banks, including Société Générale, the sum of 384,900,000 Euros for colluding to charge unjustified fees on check processing, especially for extra fees charged during the transition from paper check transfer to "Exchanges Check-Image" electronic transfer.

=== LIBOR ===
In December 2013, the European Commission fined the bank close to €446 million for its role in the LIBOR scandal regarding interest rate derivatives.In April 2016, the fine was reduced to approximately €228 million.

=== US mortgage-backed securities ===
In February 2014, Société Générale agreed to pay $122 million to the Fannie Mae and the Freddie Mac for misleading them in the purchase of mortgage-backed securities.

In January 2017, Société Générale agreed to pay $50 million to settle a claim by the American government of fraudulent concealment of residential mortgage-backed securities quality.

=== Libyan Investment Authority ===
In March 2014, the Libyan Investment Authority has filed a $1.5 billion lawsuit in London's High Court against Société Générale. The claims against the bank involve derivative transactions that took place from 2007 to 2009, and Société Générale is accused of funneling at least $58 million in bribes to Gaddafi's son Saif al-Islam Gaddafi. The French bank denied those allegations

=== US municipal bond derivatives ===
In February 2016, Société Générale paid $26.8 million to settle charges in a case of municipal bond derivatives where the French bank is accused of anticompetitive and fraudulent conduct.

=== Panama Papers ===
In March 2016, Société Générale was mentioned in the Panama Papers: It was among the 10 banks that asked for the most offshore shell companies for the account of its clients via the Mossack Fonseca firm. Its headquarters were searched by the French tax police on 5 April 2016, as the bank was linked with the creation of 979 offshore companies. In 2012, CEO Frédéric Oudéa said that Société Générale withdrew from all countries belonging to the grey list of tax havens compiled by the OECD, including Panama. Despite this previous statement, Mr Oudéa defended that those offshore companies were not meant to be used as tax evasion vehicles.

=== U.S. sanctions ===
In November 2018, the U.S. Department of the Treasury's Office of Foreign Assets Control (OFAC) announced a $53,966,916.05 settlement with Société Générale S.A. to settle potential civil liability for apparent violations of U.S. sanctions. The settlement resolves OFAC's investigation into Société Générale S.A.'s processing of transactions to or through the United States or U.S. financial institutions in a manner that removed, omitted, obscured, or otherwise failed to include references to OFAC-sanctioned parties in the information sent to U.S. financial institutions that were involved in the transactions.

== See also ==
- Inter-Alpha Group of Banks
- List of banks in France
- List of banks in the euro area

== Bibliography ==
- Maréchaux, Laurent (2009), "Hors la loi : Anarchistes, illégalistes, as de la gâchette... ils ont choisi la liberté" [Outlaws: Anarchists, illegalists, gunslingers... They chose freedom], 978-2-7003-0152-6 (in French), Arthaud
- Steiner, Anne (2013), Les En-Dehors : Anarchistes individualistes et illégalistes à la « Belle Époque » [The Outsiders: Individualist Anarchists and Illegalists in the "Belle Époque"] (in French), Paris: L'Échappée, ISBN 9782373090574
