= Slawomir Krupa =

French-Polish businessman

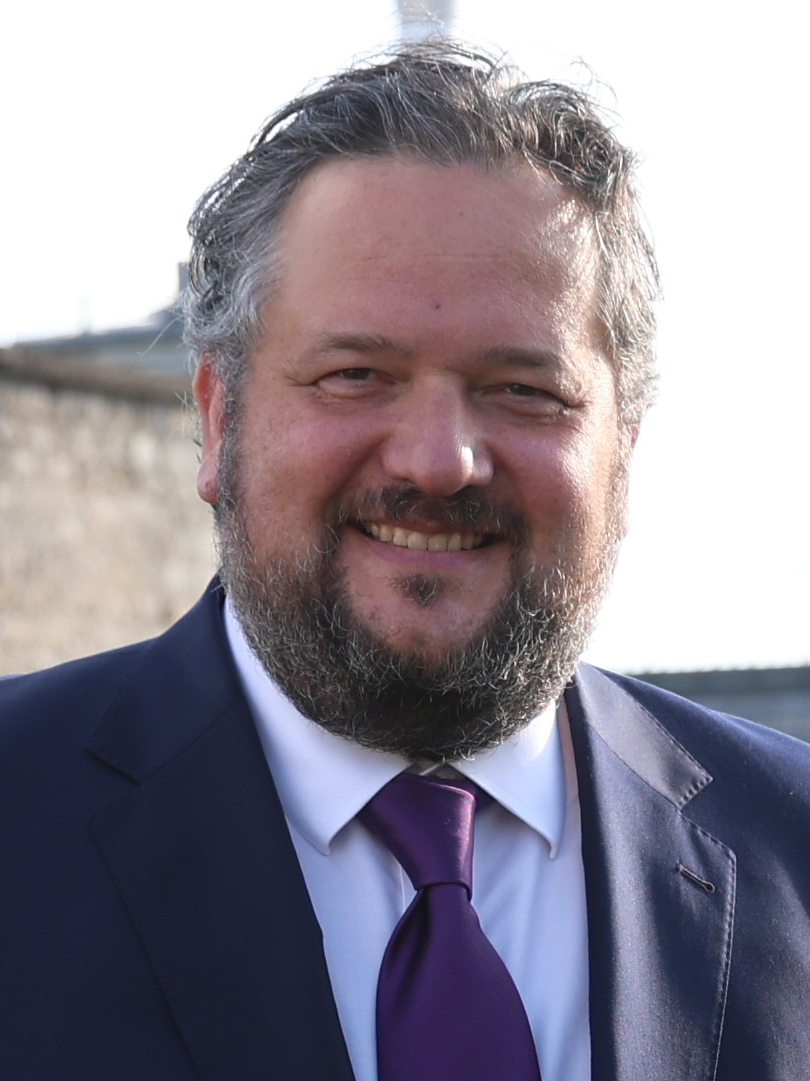
- Slawomir Krupa in 2025
- Born: June 18, 1974 (age 51); Burgas, Bulgaria
- Occupation: Banker
- Known for: CEO of Société Generale (2023-) and Chairman of European Banking Federation (2025-)
- Spouse: Magdalena
- Children: 1

Slawomir Krupa (born on June 18, 1974) is a French banker and business executive. He was chosen on September 30, 2022, to lead Société Générale starting from May 23, 2023. He has also been chairperson of the European Banking Federation since 2025.

== Early life ==
Born in Bulgaria, he first lived in Poland, before moving to France in 1980 with his mother, Zofia Cygal-Krupa, who became a lecturer in linguistics at the University of Lille-III. His father, Zdzisław Krupa, was a Polish language teacher in high schools in Kraków, then in the Nord-Pas-de-Calais region, before returning with his wife to teach at the Jagiellonian University.

His mother, Zofia Cygal-Krupa was recruited at the Jagiellonian University right after her studies. As part of university exchanges, she was a lecturer at the University of Lille-III in 1980, then a senior lecturer (1995); in 1998, she was a visiting professor at the Université Jean-Moulin-Lyon-III. In 2002, she was tenured as a professor at the Jagiellonian University, and became a visiting professor at the Hankuk University of Foreign Studies in Seoul.

Krupa studied at Sciences Po Paris, where he took a finance course that sparked his interest in banking.

== Career ==
Following his education, he joined the Société Générale group in 1996 as an inspector at the General Inspection department. He was tasked with regaining the confidence of the Fed after BNP Paribas had to pay a $9 billion fine and Société Générale had to pay a $2.6 billion fine. In January 2021, he was appointed Deputy CEO of the Large Clients and Investor Solutions Banking division. He then negotiated with the United States government for the abandonment of charges related to embargo violations, suspicions of corruption with the Libyan sovereign wealth fund, and the manipulation of interbank rates.

On September 30, 2022, the board of directors decided to propose in the General Meeting on May 23, 2023, to elect him to the board of directors, after which he could be appointed as the new CEO of Société Générale. He thus beat his main competitor in this election, Sébastien Proto, who was the favourite for the position but had little seniority in the bank and no experience in investment banking and financing. The issues awaiting him are, in particular, the growth of the online bank Boursorama and the automotive leasing company ALD. He also manages the joint venture project with Alliance Bernstein.

Presented as a leader with a very direct style who breaks away from that of his predecessor, upon his arrival, he immediately implemented a review of the business portfolio, followed by a vast program of cost reduction and disposals to strengthen the Group's financial solidity. In 2024, Slawomir Krupa received a fixed salary of €1.65 million, plus a variable component of €2.23 million, totalling €3.88 million. In 2025 he was appointed chairman of the European Banking Federation.

== Personal life ==
During his stay in Poland from 1999 to 2002, he met his future wife, a Polish pianist. The couple has one daughter. During his stay in New York, he developed a passion for catamaran regattas. He has regularly affirmed his preference for a European refocusing of Société Générale's activities and denies that all divestments of African subsidiaries are linked to his political views.
