= Rafael Termes =

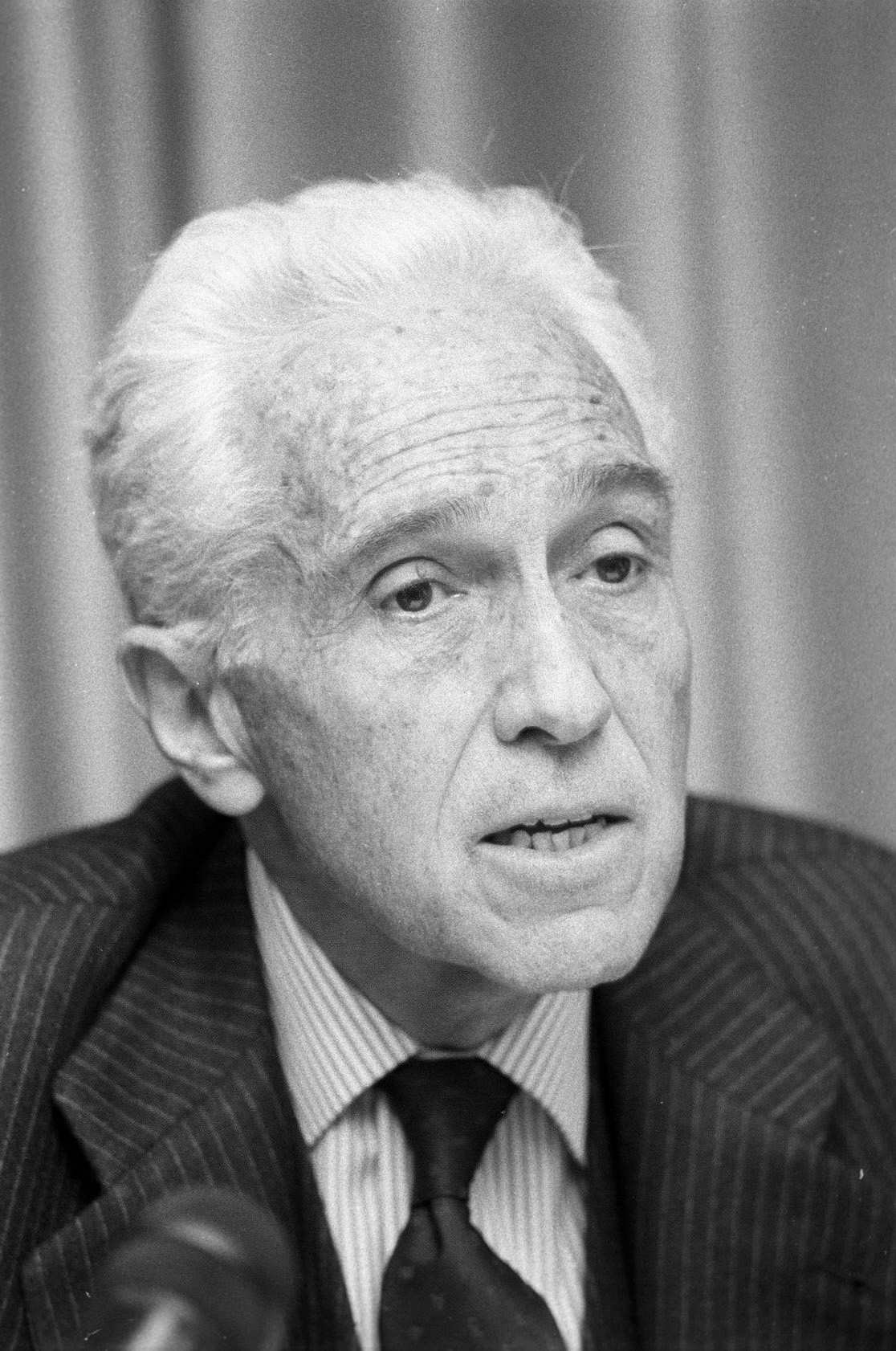
- Rafel terms in 1989
- Born: 5 December 1918; Sitges, Barcelona
- Died: 25 August 2005 (aged 86)
- Occupations: Economist and banker
- Known for: President of the Spanish Bank Association 1977-1990

Dr. Rafael Termes i Carreró (5 December 1918 - 25 August 2005) was a Spanish banker, economist and financial author born in Sitges, Barcelona. Although he graduated as an Industrial Engineer, he chose a career in finance and banking.

Termes was founder and teacher of the IESE Business School and also a director of IESE's Madrid campus since 1997, position that ceased in June 2000, to become honorary president of the IESE in Madrid. He was a member of the Royal Academy of Moral and Political Sciences, and of the Academy of Economics and Finance and a member of Opus Dei.

== Career ==
Between 1951 and 1954 he set up the Crèdit Andorrà, and he acted as Delegate Advisor from 1955 to 1965, and Advisor from 1965 to 1970. In 1955 he was appointed Regional Advisor to the Spanish Popular Bank, where he worked until named Vice-President of the Regional Council in Barcelona in 1960.

He became a member of the Administrative Board of the Spanish Popular Bank in 1964, and, later that year, was instrumental in creating a new branch - the European Business Bank. In 1965, he helped set up the Spanish Analysts' Investment Institute, the board of which he presided over until 1973 when he was named Honorary President. He became Delegate Advisor to the Spanish Popular Bank in 1966. From 1966 to 1977, he was Delegate Advisor to the Spanish Bank Association (AEB), before serving as President from 1977 until 1990, when he decided not to run for re-election. For three years, from 1970 to 1973, he represented Spain in the EFFAS - European Federation of Financial Analysts' Societies.

== Works ==
Ever a staunch defender of human liberty and of a free market as the means to attain improved social order, Rafael Termes has published, among other works: El poder creador del riesgo (1986); Del estatismo a la libertad. Perspectiva de los países del Este (1990); Desde la banca. Tres décadas de la vida económica española (1991); Antropología del capitalismo: un debate abierto abierto (1992); Las causas del paro (1995); and Desde la libertad (1997).
