= Fédération Bancaire Française =

Fédération bancaire française
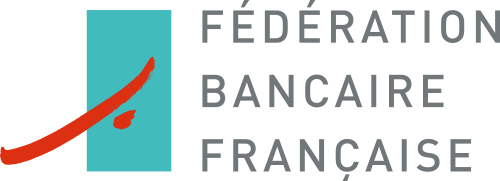
- Headquarters: Paris, France
- Key people: Daniel Baal, Chairman of the French Banking Federation, Maya Atig, Chief Executive Officer of the FBF
- Website: fbf.fr/en/

The Fédération Bancaire Française (French: French Banking Federation) (FBF) is the professional body representing over 320 commercial, cooperative, and mutual banks operating in France including 115 foreign banks.

== Leadership ==
- Chairman of the FBF (since September 2025) : Daniel Baal, Chairman of the Confédération Nationale du Crédit Mutuel.
- Chief executive of the FBF (since March 2020) : Maya Atig

== Membership ==
The FBF represents French banks and foreign banks that have set up subsidiaries or branches in France, whether they are from Europe or elsewhere.

Credit institutions that are authorized to operate as banks in France and branches of credit institutions based in the European Economic Area are fully entitled to become members of the FBF, which is their professional body(1). Other ipso facto members include the central bodies of cooperative and mutual banking groups and the French Bankers Association (AFB).

== Missions ==
The French Banking Federation (FBF) promotes the banking and financial services industries in the French, European and international markets, and sets out the industry's positions and proposals to officials and regulatory authorities in the fields of business and finance. The FBF also issues professional standards, best practices and recommendations, and makes its experience available to its members. Its mission also includes keeping members among French banks informed of anything that may concern their activities. To fulfil its mandate, the FBF is structured around three departments : Banking and Financial Activities and Research, Information and External Relations, European and International Affairs.

== Structure of the FBF ==
=== Banking and Financial Activities and Research ===
This department offers a range of banking support, and oversees the FBF's commissions and committees in areas including retail banking and direct banking, investment banking and capital markets, risk control and capital adequacy requirements, payment systems and instruments, and legal and tax issues. It also negotiates and works with various French and European government and regulatory authorities.

=== Information and External Relations ===
The role of this department is to anticipate changes in the political, economic and social environment, promote the role of the banking sector in society and keep the general public informed. It is responsible for public affairs, including relations with government officials, the media, consumers, young people and teachers. It makes sure that banks are kept informed, and organizes the activity of the FBF's regional committees.

=== European and International Affairs ===
This department, based in Brussels and in Paris, handles relations with EU institutions and the various bodies representing the banking and financial services industries in Europe. It monitors international issues and relations with global banking associations, and deals with issues that specifically concern foreign banks operating in France.

== See also ==
- List of banks in France
