= Michel Antoine (anarchist) =

French individualist and illegalist anarchist (1858–1929)

- Born: 6 April 1858; Paris
- Died: 8 December 1929 (aged 71)
- Other names: Levieux, Lejeune, Ego, Ixe, N'importe qui, Quelconque, Lux, A. Vérité, Vignon, Simplice, Ernest Toulouze
- Occupations: florist, anarchist, criminal, counterfeiter
- Known for: Anarchist activism
- Movement: Anarchism (individualist/illegalist tendencies)
- Criminal penalty: Deportation and imprisonment in a penal colony for life (in absentia) (1900)

Michel Antoine, nicknamed the "Juvenal of Anarchy", also known by his pseudonyms N'importe qui ('Anyone'), Levieux ('Theold'), Lejeune ('Theyoung') or Lux, among many others, born on 6 April 1858 in Paris and died on 8 December 1929 in Nice, was a French florist, and an illegalist and individualist anarchist. He is best known for his role within anarchism in France, where he was one of the figures of European individualist anarchism and illegalism.

After deserting during his military service, Antoine became close to Louise Michel, whom he accompanied during her lectures. Following a stay in prison, he launched a horticulture business, where he received Émile Henry and Ravachol, among others - and organized anarchist meetings. As he began to write in the anarchist press of the period, particularly in La Révolte, the police sought him for his counterfeiting activities, and he was sentenced in absentia to lifelong deportation to a penal colony in 1900. In the following decade, Antoine became involved in a significant number of anarchist and individualist anarchist publications of the period, where he theorized and defended illegalism, individualist anarchism, and the use of violence. Among the publications in which he wrote, the most notable was L'Anarchie, and his articles, often violent and insulting towards other anarchists, caused conflicts between the newspaper and those targeted.

After World War I, during which he helped deserters flee the army and France and himself joined Barcelona, he returned to France and continued his editorial activities in the individualist anarchist publications of the interwar period. He died in 1929 under a false identity in Nice.

== Biography ==
=== Youth and desertion ===
Michel Antoine was born on 6 April 1858 in Paris. His mother, Marie Meillorat, did not work, while his father, Jean-Baptiste Antoine, was a junk dealer. During his military service, after four months with the 65th Line Infantry Regiment, he deserted the army, hid under the name Vignon, and then went to the United Kingdom.

=== Integration into Anarchism ===
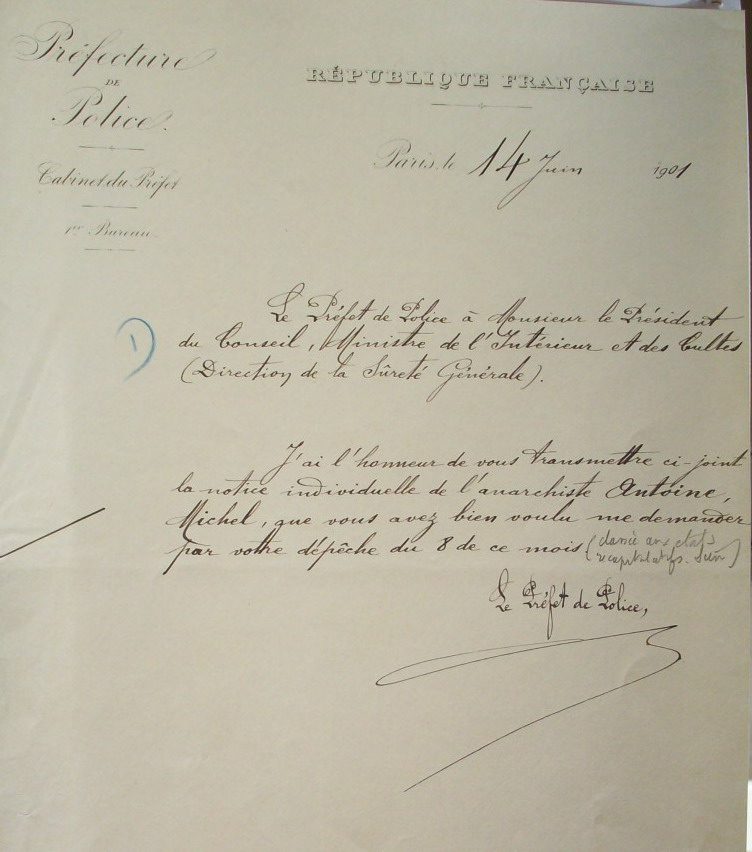
Police prefect of Paris answering to the French president of the Council of Ministers, the Minister of the Interior and the Chief of Sûreté on their request for informations on Michel Antoine (14 June 1901) - courtesy of Archives anarchistes

Having returned to France after his exile, he frequented and often accompanied Louise Michel to the meetings she organized at the time. The police noted him distributing anarchist newspapers and brochures – he also allegedly had "tastes opposed to nature" according to the same report.

Arrested on 19 June 1889 and sentenced to two years in prison, he was released after three months thanks to an amnesty. Antoine then became a florist in the 20th arrondissement of Paris, at 38, rue de Fontarabie. This location served as a meeting place for a number of notable anarchists of the period and the Ère des attentats (1892–1894), particularly Ravachol and Émile Henry. He was also close to Fortuné Henry, Émile Henry's brother, whom he associated with. He also participated in the Cercle international anarchiste during this period.

Antoine also began, in the early 1890s, to frequent anarchist communist circles, for example with the Groupe des Égaux or by writing in La Révolte of Jean Grave and Peter Kropotkin. The anarchist distinguished himself by very often using pseudonyms, one of the most notable being N'importe Qui ('Anyone'), but also Levieux ('Theold'), Lux, and numerous other false names to sign his articles. In La Révolte, Antoine published an anonymous text, Viande à mitraille (Cannon Fodder), in which he targeted the army for its responsibility in the Fourmies massacre. This article earned Grave six months in prison; he refused to disclose Antoine's identity to the authorities and took responsibility for the article himself. Grave described him as follows:

tall, 28 to 30 years old, with a face cut by a thin black mustache, neatly dressed but with something of a cat, a priest, and a young girl in his manners! The most paradoxical man.

=== Individualist anarchism and illegalism ===
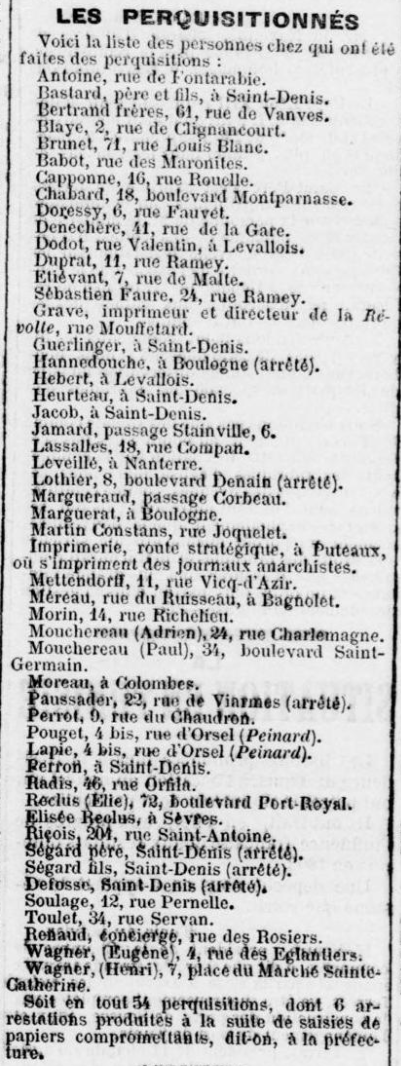
List of those raided in Île-de-France (region around Paris), the list includes among others Michel Antoine, the Reclus brothers, Jean Grave, or Sébastien Faure in L'Estafette (2 January 1894).

N'importe Qui was raided several times during the repression of January and February 1894, including on the first day, where he was at the top of the list of those searched in Paris because his name started with 'A'. The police found copies of La Revue anarchiste, L’Autonomie individuelle, L’Attaque, l’Endehors, La Révolte, La Revue Libertaire, and Le Père Peinard at his home. During this period, he became involved in counterfeiting with a group of anarchist companions, one of whom was Étienne Requet. When the group was arrested, he managed to escape the police by realizing that the signal used by his companions was not being reproduced; and, returning home, learned that the police were looking for him, which meant Requet had denounced him.

Antoine then went underground, hid the other comrade with him, and bore no grudge against Requet, whom he tried to help escape from the penal colony in Cayenne where he was sentenced to life imprisonment. The attempt was being organized when Requet died from dysentery. In 1896, his florist business was liquidated by the courts, and Antoine was still underground, spending some time with his mother.

He then set up a business and sold it, which gave him a nest egg allowing him to ensure his economic independence, according to Le Maitron. In 1900, Antoine was sentenced in absentia to lifelong deportation to a penal colony by the Cour d'assises of the Seine. He participated in L’Ennemi du Peuple, in Grave's Temps Nouveaux, and especially in L'Anarchie by Albert Libertad and Anna Mahé, whom he also financially supported. His articles in the latter newspaper were long texts defending the use of violence and theorizing the individualist anarchist tendency of illegalism. He also produced antimilitarist texts, and like Grave, N'importe qui considered that the anarcho-syndicalist method of sabotage would not be a good method of action.

The anarchist engaged in polemics targeting figures like Charles Malato in this newspaper. Thus, after Malato launched a media campaign to try, unsuccessfully, to save Francisco Ferrer from the death penalty, he wrote against him, among others:

We said nothing while our revolutionary clowns rattled their bells to frighten the Spanish firing squads. We had no illusions, knowing full well that the bluff of these comical demonstrations, masking a real weakness, would prevent nothing. [...] The ridiculous boasts of these jesters and social misfits had no chance of achieving the result they claimed to aim for. It was a bluff, a drum-beating for show, like everything these gentlemen do.

This article caused conflicts among anarchists in France. The anarcho-syndicalist Miguel Almereyda responded to his criticisms shortly after, notably accusing him of being someone "on the fringe of all action". He then replied to him in an article titled La volaille ('The Poultry'), where he was very violent towards his opponents, before L'Anarchie became the target of reprisals.

While Victor Serge was put on trial for his management of L'Anarchie and his support for the Bonnot Gang—a support shared by N'importe qui—Serge complained that André Lorulot was not being targeted by the justice system. Lorulot replied that he had never defended illegalism and that within the newspaper, it was mainly Serge and Antoine who were responsible for such orientations, and not himself. Lorulot wrote that in response to his criticisms of illegalism, Serge had let Antoine respond to him, in an article where the latter insulted him as being an "honesty-maniac" and compared him to Grave.

During World War I, Antoine helped a number of soldiers desert, then exfiltrated himself from France to Spain, where he settled in Catalonia, like other French individualist anarchists, such as Victor Serge. According to Serge, Antoine was the embodiment of the illegalist and individualist anarchist. He described him in these terms:

He preferred establishments with two exits and, there, certain corners where one could more or less disappear, leaning back, behind a unfolded newspaper. His insignificant name was known to only a small number of us. His past was known to no one. Comrades remembered having called him Levieux ('Theold') in Paris and London about fifteen years earlier.

=== Final years ===
N'importe qui returned to France after the war and settled in Nice. He wrote for numerous individualist publications of the period, such as Le Libertaire, La Vie anarchiste, Les Vagabonds individualistes libertaires, Terre libre, and Le Semeur de Normandie. He also published a three-issue newspaper, Le Réaliste.

He died on 8 December 1929 in Nice, under the false identity of Pierre Maestrini, born on 16 February 1854 in Augio, Switzerland.

== Pseudonyms and nicknames ==
In addition to "Juvenal of Anarchy", a nickname given by Charles Malato and Ernest Gégout, he himself used a large number of pseudonyms when publishing signed articles – which was not always the case. Among these pseudonyms were, among others, N'importe qui ('Anyone'), Lux ('Light'), Lejeune ('Theyoung'), Levieux ('Theold'), Quelconque ('Any'), Ego, Ixe, Simplice ('Simpleton') (like the anarchist Gabriel Grandjean at the same time), Ernest Toulouze, A. Vérité ('A. Truth') or Vignon.

== Works ==
=== Articles for Le Révolté/La Révolte ===
- Viande à mitraille, 16 May 1891, early anarchist reaction on the Fourmies massacre (1 May 1891) and criticism of 'the people' for agreeing to serve in the army (6 months in jail for Jean Grave who refused to give his identity to the police) (Front page and first article of the issue)

=== Articles for L'Anarchie ===
- Du fort d’Usseau à la rue de Rohan, 15 June 1905, discussing and supporting the Rohan bombing (signed 'Simplice' which is also the pseudonym of Gabriel Grandjean)
- Ô Vanité des Vanités, 6 July 1905, supporting materialism and opposing religion (signed 'Simplice' which is also the pseudonym of Gabriel Grandjean)
- Religion humaine, 27 July 1905, speaking about a 'humankind religion' that would be anarchist and moral (signed 'Simplice' which is also the pseudonym of Gabriel Grandjean)
- Les Moralistes, 29 October 1908, discussing morality, its impact, reasons, and criticizing Nietzsche
- Byzantinisme et Avachissement, 7 January 1909, defending illegalism and criticizing the opponents to it

== Bibliography ==
- Bianco, René; Dupuy, Rolf (October 7, 2024). "ANTOINE Michel [dit Lux, Levieux, N'importe qui…]". Dictionnaire des anarchistes (in French). Paris: Maitron/Editions de l'Atelier.
- Libertad, Albert; Accardo, Alain (2006), Le culte de la charogne : Anarchisme, un état de révolution permanente (1897-1908) [The Cult of Carrion: Anarchism, a state of permanent revolution (1897-1908)] (in French), Paris: Agone, ISBN 9782748900224
- Maitron, Jean (1964), "De Kibaltchiche à Victor Serge : Le Rétif (1909-1919)", Le Mouvement Social (47), Paris: 45–80, doi:10.2307/3777210, JSTOR 3777210
