= Individual reclamation =

Theft justified as reappropriation in French anarchism

Individual reclamation (French: reprise individuelle) was the term used by some anarchists for theft committed as a reappropriation of wealth, which they held to have been taken from the poor by the governing classes. Its supporters argued that the bourgeoisie, through its ownership of the means of production, appropriated the wealth created by the workers, so that taking it back was a restitution and not a theft.

The practice became an issue in French anarchism with the trials of Clément Duval in 1887 and Vittorio Pini in 1889. It divided the movement: Sébastien Faure, Élisée Reclus and Paul Reclus approved of theft as a revolutionary act, while Jean Grave and Peter Kropotkin rejected it. Its best-known practitioner was Marius Jacob, whose gang burgled houses and churches across France in the early 1900s and gave part of its takings to the anarchist cause. He was tried at Amiens in 1905 for 156 burglaries. After 1900 the individualist anarchists around Albert Libertad and the paper L'Anarchie, drawing on Max Stirner's thoughts, took up the practice and developed the doctrine of illegalism, in which theft served the thief's own interests as well as the cause. The practice declined after the demise of the Bonnot Gang in 1913, when most of the anarchist movement condemned illegalism.

== Name ==
The French expression reprise individuelle literally means 'individual taking back'. English-language works translate it as "individual reclamation" or speak of individual "re-appropriation" of bourgeois property. Its supporters also spoke of a right to restitution. In anarchist slang, the practice was called la reprise au tas ('taking back the whole heap'). The related practice of estampage ('swindling') consisted of obtaining goods or credit without paying for them.

== Doctrine ==
Supporters of individual reclamation held that the poverty of the lower classes resulted from a permanent theft committed against them by their exploiters. Stealing from the exploiters was therefore a form of legitimate self-defence. According to French anarchist Clément Duval, theft was the restitution of wealth that had been produced collectively and wrongly seized by a few, carried out by an individual who was aware of this. The anarchist burglars of the period defended their acts as a matter of principle, not of profit. In their view, the bourgeoisie, through its ownership of the means of production, appropriated the wealth created by the workers and was seen as the real thief.

In the view of anarchist thinker Élisée Reclus, workers had the right to take back all the products of its labour. Since collective property had been appropriated by a few, the isolated individual had "the absolute right to take, to steal, as it is called in common language", but it should be judged by its motive. Anarcho-communist Sébastien Faure distinguished between the theft itself, which he always approved, and the use made of the proceeds, which he reserved the right to approve or condemn. Paul Reclus argued in 1891 that in a capitalist society theft and work did not differ in nature, since profits made from the work of the lower class was being stolen by the ruling class.

The historian Constance Bantman sets individual reclamation within the broader notion of anarchist illegalism, which anarcho-capitalist journal Le Révolté had defined as "permanent rebellion" by every means "which is not legality". Bantman describes it as a symbolic protest against the law and social conventions, but also as a convenient excuse for robbers who used anarchism as a pretext, which eventually damaged the movement's reputation. Historian John Merriman also sets individual reclamation as one central argument of illegalism. Richard Parry places the doctrine alongside propaganda of the deed: just as the anarchist aim of abolishing the State had been reduced to individual acts of assassination and bombing, the call for the "expropriation of the expropriators" was reduced to individual acts of re-appropriation.

== History ==
=== Background ===
Historian Jean Maitron notes that by 1847 some communists had already practised individual reclamation, interpreting the ideas of Pierre-Joseph Proudhon in their own way. In 1885, Jean Grave's paper Le Révolté discussed theft in two articles, "Les Voleurs" and "La Morale". While it saw no difference between a bourgeois and a thief, it accepted collective or even individual reclamation if it was carried out openly as a revolutionary act.

=== Clément Duval ===
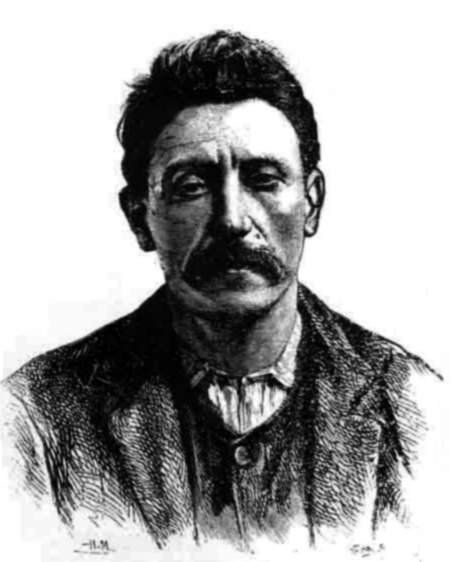
Clément Duval

In October 1886, Clément Duval, a member of the anarchist group La Panthère des Batignolles ('The Panther of Batignolles'), burgled a private mansion in the rue de Monceau in Paris, taking silverware and jewellery worth around 15,000 francs, and set fire to it.

During his trial in January 1887, Duval refused to be treated as a common thief and claimed the right to "restitution". When he tried to speak as an accuser rather than as the accused, the presiding judge refused him the floor and had him removed from the court. He was sentenced to death, but President Jules Grévy commuted the sentence to hard labour for life. Duval became a hero in anarchist circles. He later escaped from French Guiana in 1901, settled in New York, and died there in 1935.

The Duval case forced Le Révolté to take a position, and after the Guesdist socialists condemned Duval, it came out in his support. Other anarchist papers went further. L'Action révolutionnaire called on its readers in 1887 to fund propaganda by robbing banks, post offices and the wealthy, and Ça Ira urged them in 1888 to set an example by taking back the fortunes of the rich.

=== Vittorio Pini, Léon Ortiz and the anarchist debate ===
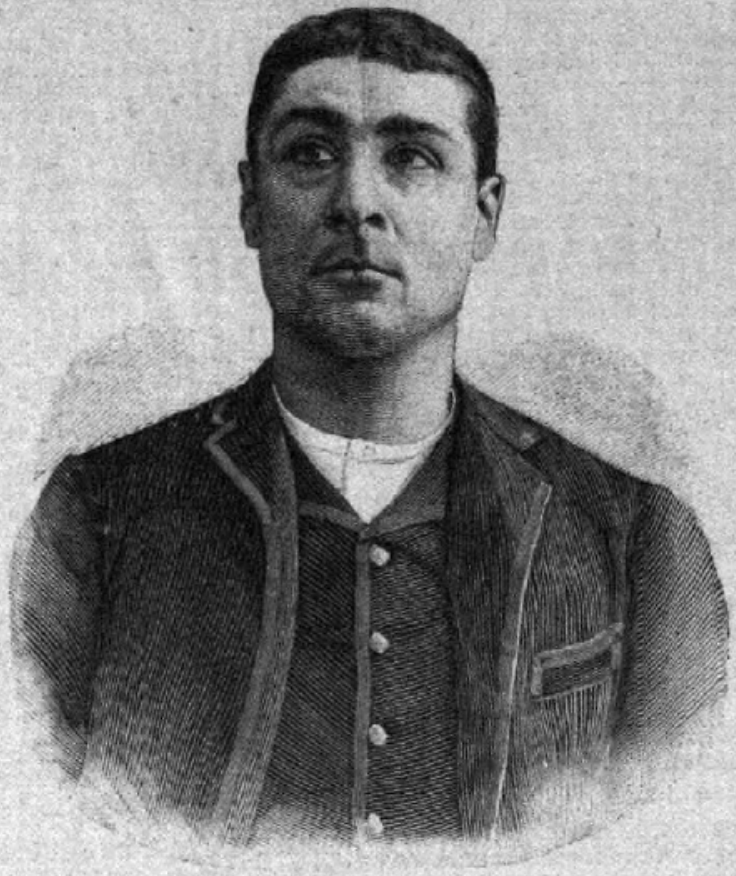
Vittorio Pini

Vittorio Pini, an Italian shoemaker living in Paris, had founded the anarchist group Intransigenti around 1887. A search of his home in June 1889 uncovered burglar's tools and what remained of the proceeds of many thefts, estimated at 400,000 to 500,000 francs. At his trial in November 1889 he took full responsibility and defended the right to theft, or rather to restitution. He was sentenced to twenty years of hard labour. From Le Père Peinard to La Révolte, the anarchist press approved of his case.

An international anarchist meeting in Paris in July 1889 discussed the question without reaching a clear conclusion. Two positions took shape. Sébastien Faure and some writers of La Révolte, among them Paul and Élisée Reclus, approved of theft in all cases as a revolutionary act. Conversely, Jean Grave argued that the people did not wish to be robbed in the name of equality, and that a revolutionary party should not perpetuate the theft, lying and swindling that made up the society it wanted to destroy. Peter Kropotkin was equally hostile. Maitron notes that some anarchists used the theory as a pretext to live at the expense of other anarchists or of shopkeepers who gave them credit.

A tract signed Les Impurs universels ('The Universal Impure'), printed in England and distributed in France in late 1890, took the theory to its most extreme conclusions. It declared that "the more theft multiplies, the more property will be divided, and the sooner the social revolution will come", and called for the necessity of theft to be spread as a right of war against the capitalist bourgeoisie. Maitron attributes it to the group that published the London paper L'International, whose July 1890 issue carried an article titled "Vole, c'est ton devoir" ('Steal, it is your duty'). The group around L'International led the anti-organisationalist and illegalist side in a quarrel with the leading anarcho-communists, who suspected the individualists of using individual reclamation as an excuse for plain stealing.

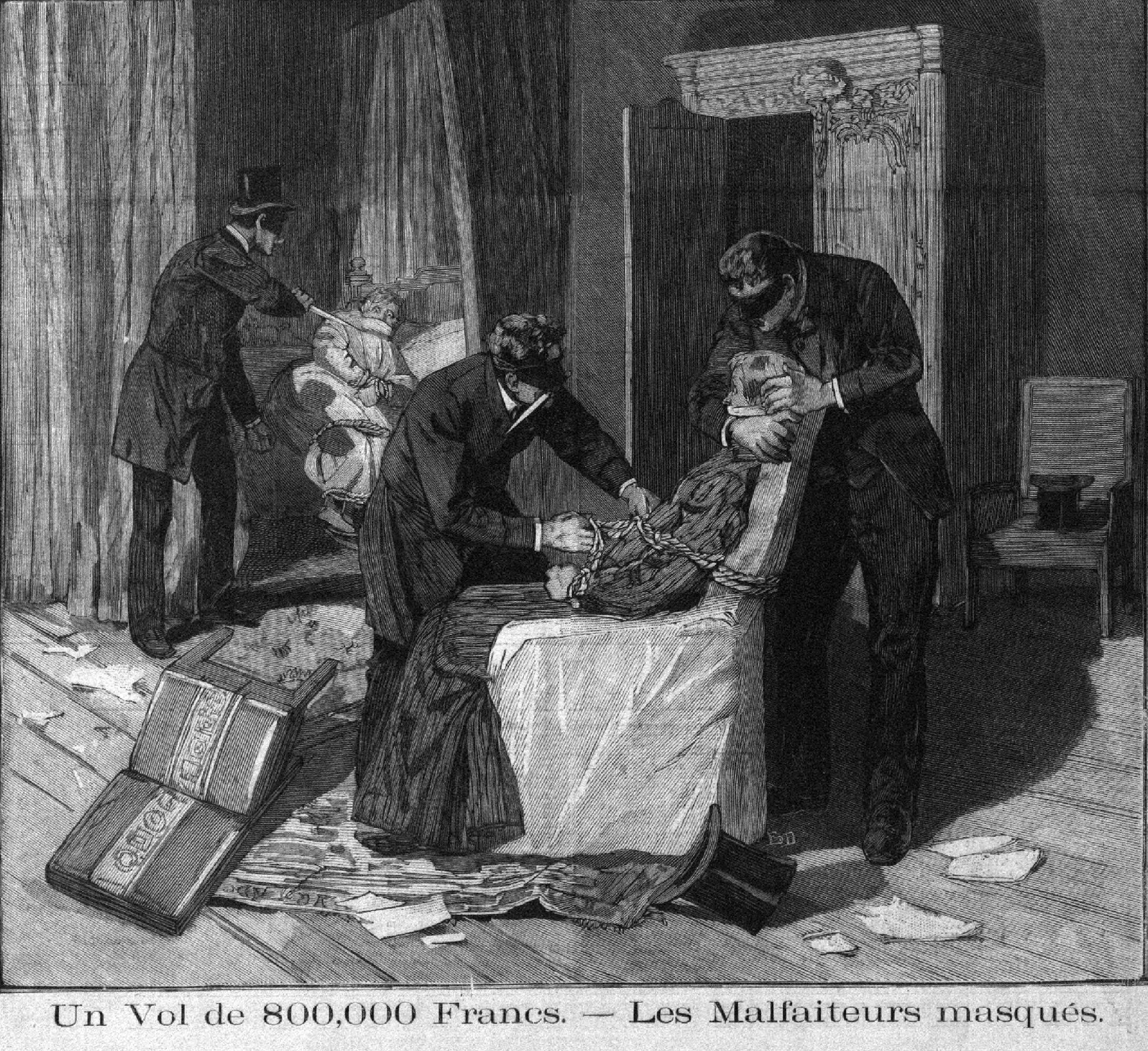
Romanced depiction of the Fiquefleur burglary by the Ortiz gang in Le Petit Parisien

In 1894, members of an anarchist gang led by Léon Ortiz were convicted at the Trial of the Thirty, where they had been tried for criminal conspiracy together with anarchist writers such as Faure, Grave, Émile Pouget and Paul Reclus, who were all acquitted. The trial led Grave to refuse any part in theories defending theft. He held that theft could only count as a protest against society if it was done openly, since a thief who stole in secret was no different from any other thief.

=== Marius Jacob ===
Around 1900, French anarchist Alexandre Marius Jacob decided to set up an organised anarchist gang that would fund both the movement and its members. It took the name Les Travailleurs de la Nuit ('The Night Workers'). The gang chose its targets from directories that listed the names and addresses of the rich. Its burglaries included the cathedral at Tours, an admiral's house in Cherbourg and a judge's house at Le Mans. In principle, the gang stole only from those it classed as "parasites", and Jacob asked its members to give at least ten per cent of the proceeds to anarchist propaganda, in order to set individual reclamation apart from mere theft. As the group grew, some members left to form their own gangs, and the resulting federation came to include up to a hundred people, a growing share of whom were not anarchists. Jacob used the fortune he took to support the families of imprisoned anarchists and to fund anarchist papers and propaganda.

Jacob was arrested at Abbeville after an exchange of fire in which a policeman was killed. At the Somme assizes in Amiens in March 1905, he was charged with 156 burglaries. Jacob used the hearings to attack "legal theft" and declared: "The right to live is not begged for, it is taken. Theft is restitution, the taking back of possession." He was sentenced to hard labour for life and sent to the penal colony in French Guiana. Jacob's life inspired Maurice Leblanc's character Arsène Lupin.

=== Individualist anarchism ===
A new current, anarchist individualism, emerged in France after 1900, taking its theoretical source mainly from Max Stirner's The Ego and Its Own. In Paris the milieu formed around Albert Libertad. From 1902 he ran causeries populaires ('public discussion meetings') at which he encouraged individual reclamation, and in April 1905 he launched the weekly L'Anarchie. As the individualists wanted to live as neither exploiters nor exploited, their answer was direct action through individual reclamation.

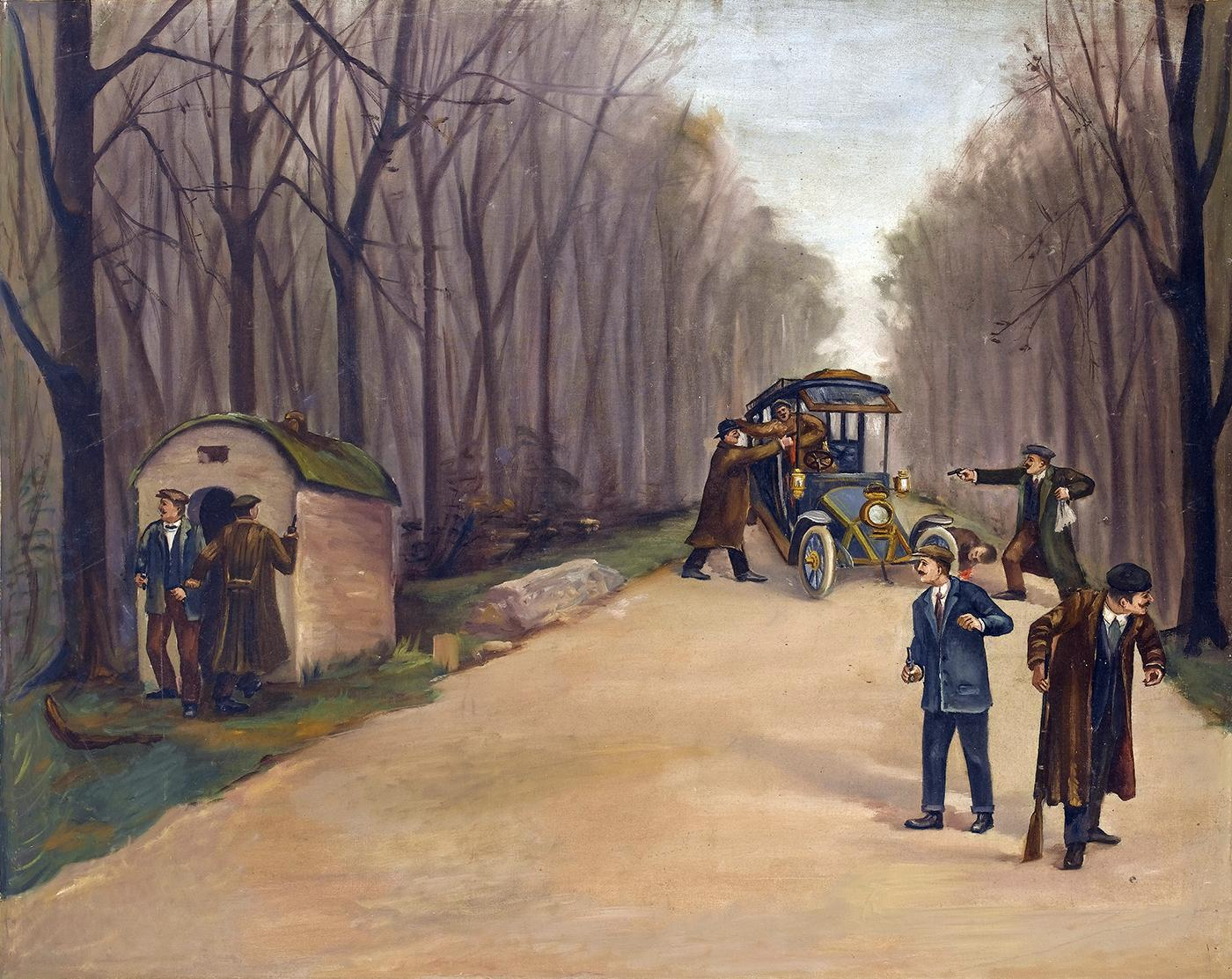
A 1912 illustration of the Bonnot Gang stealing an automobile in the Forest of Senart.

By the end of 1908, L'Anarchie was the only anarchist paper that openly promoted crime and the theory of illegalism. Following Stirner, the illegalists stole for their own advancement and not only for the cause. After Libertad died in November 1908, André Lorulot took over the paper in August 1909. Lorulot encouraged illegal activity since it involved "minimal risks and satisfactory returns", while fellow individual anarchist Émile Armand held that it mattered little whether a comrade earned his living legally or illegally.

=== Bonnot Gang affair and decline ===
The Bonnot Gang, coming from the milieu of L'Anarchie, carried out the first robbery using a car in December 1911. Its members were killed or arrested in 1912, and three of them were executed in April 1913.

After this violent end, the practice of individual reclamation went into decline, as the affair provoked a reaction against illegalism across the anarchist movement. Grave wrote that at the moment they committed their robberies the bandits had "ceased to be anarchists", their acts being "purely and simply bourgeois". Most of the writers of the individualist milieu denied having preached illegalism, or said they had been misunderstood. In August 1913 a congress of the Fédération communiste anarchiste condemned all forms of individualism as bourgeois and incompatible with anarcho-communism.
