= Harry Thompson (disambiguation) =

Harry Thompson (1960–2005) was a British comedy producer.

Harry Thompson or Harrison Thompson may also refer to:

- Harry Thompson (footballer, born 1915) (1915–2000), English footballer
- Harry Thompson (baseball) (1889–1951), baseball pitcher
- Harry Thompson (radical lawyer) (1885–1947), English solicitor and activist
- Harry Thompson (spy) (1909–1960), former United States Navy yeoman who spied for Japan
- Harry Thompson (American football) (1926–2003), American football player
- Harry Thompson (rugby league) (1910–1983), Australian rugby league footballer of the 1930s
- Harry Thompson (Australian footballer) (1871–1957), Australian rules footballer
- Harry Thompson (bowls), Welsh lawn bowler
- Harry Thompson (Hollyoaks), a fictional character in soap opera Hollyoaks
- Harry Ives Thompson (1840–1906), American painter
- Harry Langhorne Thompson (1857–1902), British colonial administrator in Cyprus and the West Indies
- Harry Arnall-Thompson (1864–1916), English cricketer
- Harrison Thompson (hurdler) (born 1895), American hurdler and decathlete, 2nd in the 120 yards hurdles at the 1924 USA Outdoor Track and Field Championships

== See also ==
- Harry Thomson (disambiguation)
- Henry Thompson (disambiguation)
- Harold Thompson (disambiguation)
