= Harold H. Thompson (anarchist) =

American anarchist activist and prisoner (1942–2008)

- Born: April 9, 1942; Huntington, West Virginia, U.S.
- Died: October 11, 2008 (aged 66); West Tennessee State Penitentiary, Lauderdale County, Tennessee, U.S.
- Occupation: Activist
- Criminal charges: Murder; Attempted escape

Harold H. Thompson (April 9, 1942 – October 11, 2008) was an American anarchist activist and prisoner.

== Biography ==
Thompson was of Irish extraction, his parents having emigrated to the United States in the early twentieth century and settled in Huntington, West Virginia. Raised in a politicized environment, Thompson acquired an interest in anarchism at an early age, having heard the political debates of his father and his father's friends. He joined the Army and served in the Vietnam War. He was discharged for being wounded, and became an anti-war and anarchist activist associated with the Vietnam Veterans Against the War during the 1960s and 1970s. He began a campaign of expropriation, and had several encounters with law enforcement.

In 1978, Walter Douglas Crawley killed the mother of Thompson's eldest son. Crawley was arrested and jailed for the murder but was soon released after serving as a jail house informant. In October 1979 Crawley was shot whilst drinking in a bar, Thompson was prosecuted and found guilty of murder and robbery in 1979.

He was condemned to life imprisonment with an additional fifty years, a sentence exacerbated by a failed escape attempt in 1986 which led to another thirty-one years added to his sentence for charges including the attempted murder of three prison officers. Shortly afterwards, he was moved to a maximum security prison where he was subjected to solitary confinement until July 1993. Whilst a prisoner, Thompson studied law, assisting other inmates in appeals and challenges, and also began writing anarchist literature and poetry.

On October 11, 2008, Harold H. Thompson suffered a heart attack, dying in West Tennessee State Penitentiary at sixty-six years of age. In accordance with his final request, Thompson's ashes were scattered over the waters of Lough Neagh in Northern Ireland by six of his anarchist friends. A frequent correspondent, Sean Matthews, oversaw the event. When asked to comment on Thompson's criminal history, Matthews described it as "no worse than the wage slavery that underpins our economy".

== Writings ==
Pamphlets

- Thompson, Harold H. (1999). Anarchist Survival Guide for Understanding Gestapo Swine Interrogation Mind Games.
- Thompson, Harold H. (1999). They Will Never Get Us All!. Huddersfield ABC.

Essays

- Thompson, Harold H. (2002-07-01). "Statement Against Censorship of Anarchist Reading Material Mailed to Prisoners". Chicago ABC Zine (1). Homewood, Illinois: South Chicago ABC Zine Distro.

== See also ==
- Illegalism, a philosophy of committing illegal acts in furtherance of anarchist goals
- Individual reclamation, the conscious act of seizing the property of the rich and giving to the poor
- Raegan Butcher, an American anarchist who wrote poetry while imprisoned for robbery
