= Henry Thomson =

Henry Thomson may refer to:

- Henry Thomson (painter) (1773–1843), English artist and Royal Academician
- Henry Thomson (Australian politician) (1872–1947), member of the Tasmanian House of Assembly
- Henry Thomson (Irish politician) (1840–1916), member of the House of Commons of the United Kingdom
- Henry Thomson (New Zealand politician) (1828–1903), mayor and member of parliament in Canterbury, New Zealand
- Henry Thomson (herald), Lord Lyon King of Arms from 1490
- Henry Broughton Thomson (1870–1939), merchant and politician in British Columbia, Canada
- Henry Thomson (footballer) (1906–1943), Australian rules footballer
- Henry Byerley Thomson (1822–1867), English barrister and jurist
- Henry Thomson (cricketer) (1854–1899), English cricketer
- Henry Alexis Thomson (1863–1924), Scottish anatomist and medical author
- Henry Wagstaffe Thomson (1874–1941), British colonial administrator

== See also ==
- Henry Thompson (disambiguation)
- Harry Thomson (disambiguation)
