= Henry Thompson =

Henry Thompson may refer to:

- Sir Henry Thompson, 1st Baronet (1820–1904), British surgeon
- Henry Thompson (1625–1683) (1620s–1683), English merchant and politician
- Henry Thompson (1659–1700), English landowner and politician
- Henry Thompson (priest) (1797–1878), English cleric and author
- Henry Francis Herbert Thompson (1859–1944), British Egyptologist
- Sir Henry Thompson, 3rd Baronet (1796–1868)
- H. S. Thompson (1824–?), American songwriter
- Henry Gregory Thompson (1871–1942), Roman Catholic Bishop of Gibraltar
- Henry A. Thompson (1841–1889), United States Marine and Medal of Honor recipient
- Henry W. Thompson (1839–1906), South Australian sailor and politician
- Henry Thompson (veterinary surgeon) (1836–1920), veterinary surgeon and author
- Henry Thompson (Medal of Honor), United States Navy sailor and Medal of Honor recipient
- Henry Thompson (Australian politician) (1906–1964)
- Henry Adams Thompson (1837–1920), American prohibitionist
- Henry M. Thompson (1861–?), American businessman and politician
- Henry Yates Thompson (1838–1928), British newspaper proprietor and collector of illuminated manuscripts
- Henry Thompson (cricketer) (born 1992), English cricketer
- Henry Thompson (footballer) (1886–?), English footballer
- Henry Langhorne Thompson (1829–1856), British Army officer

== See also ==
- Harry Thompson (disambiguation)
- Hank Thompson (disambiguation)
- Henry Thomson (disambiguation)
