= Harold Thompson =

Harold Thompson may refer to:

- Harold Thompson (chemist) (1908–1983), English physical chemist, Chairman of the Football Association
- Harold E. Thompson (1921–2003), American helicopter aviation pioneer
- Harold H. Thompson (anarchist) (1942–2008), American anarchist, anti-Vietnam war activist, author, and prisoner advocate
- Harold William Thompson (1891–1964), American folklorist and historian
- H. Keith Thompson (1922–2002), American corporate executive and far right figure

== See also ==
- Harry Thompson (disambiguation)
- Harold Thomas (disambiguation)
