= Individualist anarchism =

Branch of anarchism that emphasizes the individual and their will

Individualist anarchism or anarcho-individualism is a collection of anarchist currents that generally emphasize the individual and their will over external determinants such as groups, society, traditions, and ideological systems.

Individualist anarchism can be divided into two main distinct movements, each with its own ideological orientations and choices. On one hand, there is American individualist anarchism, which began with Warren in the 1860s. It focuses primarily on economic freedom, drawing upon Stirner's egoist anarchism and Proudhon's mutualism, and develops perspectives that are notably financial in nature. Most American individualist anarchists of the 19th century advocated mutualism, a libertarian socialist form of market socialism, or a free-market socialist form of classical economics.

On the other hand, European individualist anarchism emerged between 1885 and 1895 in the labour movement. Much less studied and not directly connected to American individualist anarchism, with virtually no influence by Proudhon or Stirner for example, it generally consisted of militants with very different outlooks—particularly marked by strong radicalism, general adherence to anarchist communism, and often highly radical positions, including significant support for revolutionary violence and propaganda of the deed. The European movement was also distinguished by its strong opposition to the emerging anarcho-syndicalism of the same period, its rejection of the distinction between bourgeoisie and proletariat—seen as social constructs of capitalism to be abolished—and its close affinity with the social outlook of the women, sex workers or criminals. This helps explain its rapid association with the rise of anarcha-feminism or illegalism in Europe, for example.

Although usually contrasted with social anarchism, both individualist and social anarchism have influenced each other. Among the early influences on American individualist anarchism are Josiah Warren, Max Stirner, Lysander Spooner, Pierre-Joseph Proudhon, Henry David Thoreau, Herbert Spencer and Anselme Bellegarrigue. For European individualist anarchism, one can find Pierre Martinet, Vittorio Pini, Clément Duval, Errico Malatesta, Émile Henry, Zo d'Axa, or groups such as the Intransigeants of London and Paris or the Pieds plats.

Within anarchism, American individualist anarchism is primarily a literary phenomenon while social anarchism has been the dominant form of anarchism, emerging in the late 19th century as a distinction from individualist anarchism after anarcho-communism replaced collectivist anarchism as the dominant tendency. American individualist anarchism has been described by some as the anarchist branch most influenced by and tied to liberalism (specifically classical liberalism), or as a part of the liberal or liberal-socialist wing of anarchism — in contrast to the collectivist or communist wing of anarchism and libertarian socialism. However, others suggest a softer divide, seeing individualist anarchists as sharing with social anarchists an opposition to state, capitalism and authority, while diverging (a) due to their evolutionary approach to change, preferring the creation of alternative institutions, such as mutual banks or communes, and (b) in their preference for a market-based system of distribution over the need-based system advocated by social anarchists. The very idea of an individualist–socialist divide is also contested by those who argue that individualist anarchism is largely socialistic and can be considered a form of individualist socialism, with non-Lockean individualism encompassing socialism. Lastly, some anarcho-capitalists claim anarcho-capitalism is part of the individualist anarchist tradition, while others disagree and reject the notion that anarcho-capitalism is a genuinely anarchist belief system or movement.

== General and ideological overview ==
=== Distinction ===
American and European individualist anarchism are distinct movements that can be considered independently from one another. This is largely due to the fact that the ideological perspectives within these currents are highly fragmented and that both movements don't influence each other in their first decades. For example, while Stirner's egoist anarchism and Proudhon's mutualism are major influences on the American individualist anarchist movement, they have little to no impact on the European movement.

Stirner, for instance, was only belatedly received in France by individualist anarchists, who found his ideas unoriginal and articulating concepts they believed they had already developed more effectively themselves. American individualist anarchism is usually way more studied and known than its European counterpart.

=== American individualist anarchism ===
The term individualist anarchism is often used as a classificatory term but in very different ways. Some such as the authors of An Anarchist FAQ use the classification individualist anarchism/social anarchism, while Bob Black contrasts an individualist anarchism and anarcho-capitalism ("Type 2 anarchism") less representative of the anarchist tradition with the more representative collectivist anarchism or anarcho-leftism ("Type 1 anarchism"). Others such as Geoffrey Ostergaard, who see individualist anarchism as distinctly non-socialist, recognizing anarcho-capitalist as part of the individualist anarchist tradition, use the classification individualist anarchism/socialist anarchism accordingly. However, others do not consider anarcho-capitalism as part of the anarchist movement, arguing that anarchism has historically been an anti-capitalist movement and anarchists reject that it is compatible with capitalism. In addition, an analysis of several individualist anarchists who advocated free-market anarchism shows that it is different from anarcho-capitalism and other capitalist theories due to these individualist anarchists retaining the labor theory of value and socialist doctrines. Other classifications include communal/mutualist anarchism.

Michael Freeden identifies four broad types of individualist anarchism. Freeden says the first is the type associated with William Godwin that advocates self-government with a "progressive rationalism that included benevolence to others". The second type is the amoral self-serving rationality of egoism as most associated with Max Stirner. The third type is "found in Herbert Spencer's early predictions, and in that of some of his disciples such as Wordsworth Donisthorpe, foreseeing the redundancy of the state in the source of social evolution". The fourth type retains a moderated form of egoism and accounts for social cooperation through the advocacy of market relationships. Individualist anarchism of different kinds have the following things in common:

1. The concentration on the individual and their will in preference to any construction such as morality, ideology, social custom, religion, metaphysics, ideas or the will of others.
2. The rejection of or reservations about the idea of revolution, seeing it as a time of mass uprising which could bring about new hierarchies. Instead, they favor more evolutionary methods of bringing about anarchy through alternative experiences and experiments and education which could be brought about today.
3. Individual experience and exploration is emphasized. The view that relationships with other persons or things can be in one's own interest only and can be as transitory and without compromises as desired since in individualist anarchism sacrifice is usually rejected. In this way, Max Stirner recommended associations of egoists.

Tucker's two socialisms were the state socialism which he associated to the Marxist school and the libertarian socialism that he advocated. What those two schools of socialism had in common was the labor theory of value and the ends, by which anarchism pursued different means.

The egoist form of individualist anarchism, derived from the philosophy of Max Stirner, supports the individual doing exactly what he pleases—taking no notice of God, state, or moral rules. To Stirner, rights were spooks in the mind, and he held that society does not exist but "the individuals are its reality"—he supported property by force of might rather than moral right. Stirner advocated self-assertion and foresaw "associations of egoists" drawn together by respect for each other's ruthlessness. Another important tendency within individualist anarchist currents emphasizes individual subjective exploration and defiance of social conventions. Individualist anarchist philosophy attracted "amongst artists, intellectuals and the well-read, urban middle classes in general".

Anarchist historian George Woodcock wrote of individualist anarchism's tendency to distrust co-operation beyond the bare necessities for an ascetic life.

=== European individualist anarchism ===
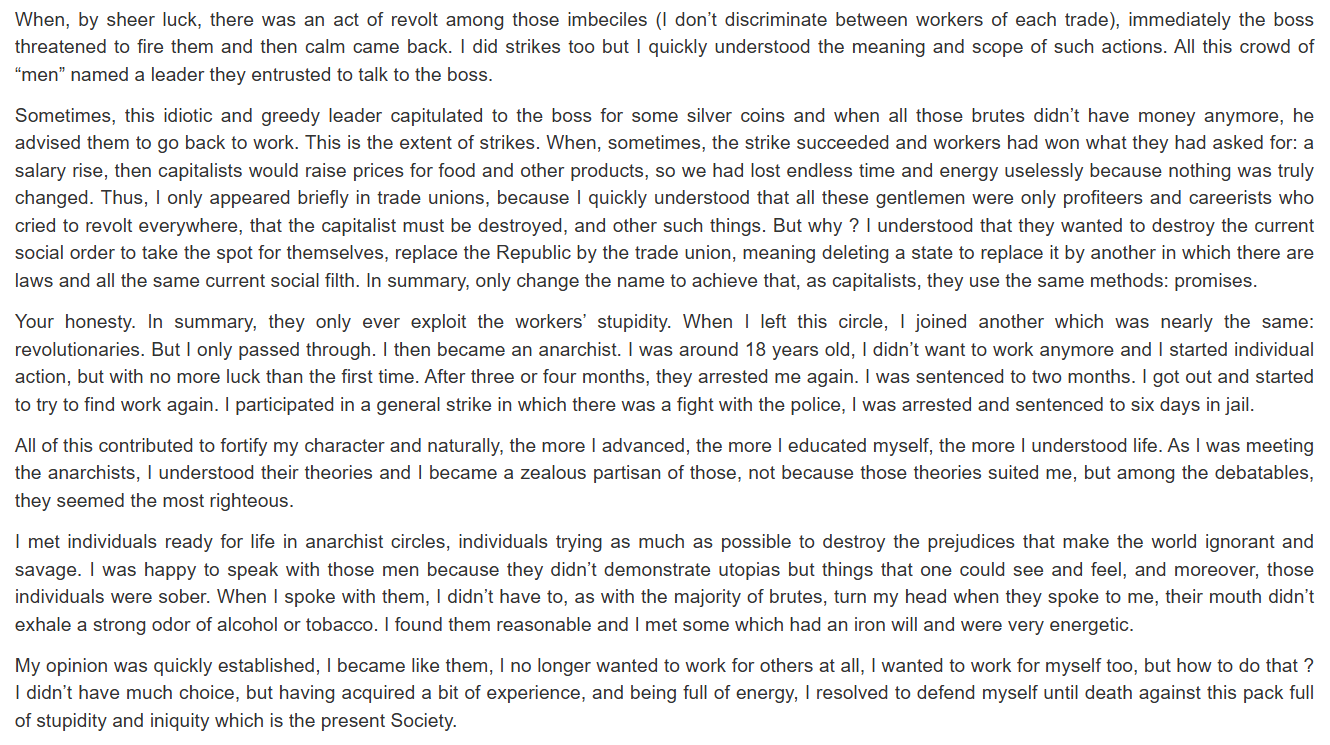
Anti-capitalist and anti-syndicalist polemics and joining of the anarchist movement by Raymond Callemin, one of the main members of the Bonnot gang in his Memoirs (1911-1913?)

In Europe, the tendency emerged later, during the 1880s and 1890s. Although it emerged later chronologically, this tendency generally did not exhibit causal links with previous American individualist anarchism, at least during its initial period. It emerged in the European labour movement of the time.

Before being theorized, the first European individualists, particularly in France, were often militants involved in illegalism or insurrectionarism. Within these circles, European individualist anarchism gradually took shape. In general, anarchists of this tendency shared several intellectual positions identified by Carl Frayne in their thesis regarding the French individualist tendency:

1. Anti-capitalism, anarcho-communism and need for an immediate Revolution : French and Italian individualist anarchists were economically committed to anarchist communism and believed that a revolution was necessary. They sometimes held romanticized views of revolution, inspired by the Paris Commune and the French Revolution. This led them to adopt a generally radical stance and support violent methods to advance the revolution. As such, they were, like other anarcho-communists, strong advocates of propaganda by the deed as a revolutionary strategy. For a number of them, this also passed through illegalism, a tendency emerged within European individualist anarchism that advocates for the robbery of capitalists.
2. Anti-syndicalism: A strong opposition to syndicalism and anarcho-syndicalism was found among these militants. Unions were perceived as structures of domination ("archistic") and as potential social-traitors due to their alleged reformist stances and collaboration with power. As a result, these militants were strongly opposed to the majority of the European anarchist movement at the time, which was gradually moving toward anarcho-syndicalism.
3. Critique of economic frameworks and attention to other struggles : These anarchists also distinguished themselves by challenging the exclusively economic interpretations of domination. Thus, communism, although shared, was not placed at the center of French individualist thought. They advocated for the abolition of the proletariat after the revolution, considering it—like the bourgeoisie—to be a social construct of capitalism. The central role given to the worker in anarcho-syndicalism also became a strong point of criticism for individualist anarchists of this tendency, who generally focused more on women, the unemployed, sex workers, or criminals, showing particular interest in the struggles of the so-called Lumpenproletariat.

This last point is illustrated for example by the soup conferences held in Paris by Pierre Martinet or Séverine in the winters of the early 1890s. The distinction between the European and American individualist anarchist movements was noted by Errico Malatesta in 1897, when he said that there would be 'the individualist anarchists of Tucker’s school' and 'the individualist anarchists of the communist school'.

The European individualist anarchism later on met the American one, such as in the thought, for example, of Émile Armand, who started including Stirner in his thought and his tendency of the European branch in the interwar period.

Individualist European anarchists are described as such by historian Céline Beaudet in her monograph on free communities in France at the beginning of the 20th century—anarchist experiments often linked to individualist circles, such as the Naturians—which prefigure anarcho-primitivism and engage in calls for a return to 'nature', she writes that:

Dissenters among dissenters, 'anarchy within anarchism', [they] are rarely considered for their own sake, either relegated to the closets of History or described through the lens of their detractors: bourgeois or police informants for 'orthodox' anarchists, bandits or criminals for the bourgeois, 'dispersion of tendencies' or 'irresponsible' revolt among historians.

== American individualist anarchism ==
=== Early precursors ===
==== William Godwin ====
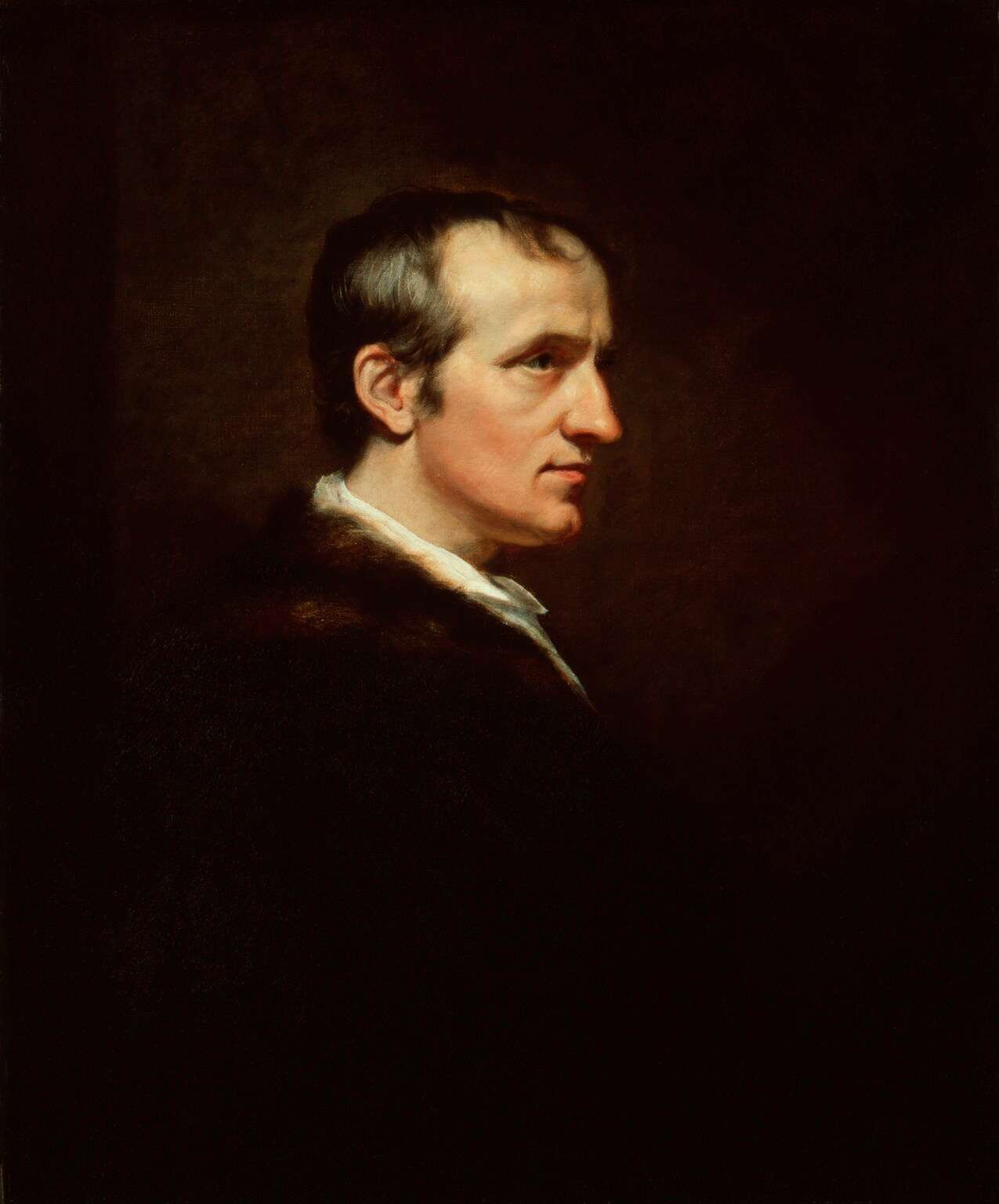
William Godwin, a radical liberal and utilitarian, who was one of the first to espouse what became known as individualist anarchism

William Godwin can be considered an individualist anarchist. Godwin advocated extreme individualism, proposing that all cooperation in labor be eliminated. Godwin was a utilitarian who believed that all individuals are not of equal value, with some of us "of more worth and importance" than others depending on our utility in bringing about social good. Therefore, he does not believe in equal rights, but the person's life that should be favored that is most conducive to the general good. Godwin opposed government because it infringes on the individual's right to "private judgement" to determine which actions most maximize utility, but also makes a critique of all authority over the individual's judgement. This aspect of Godwin's philosophy, minus the utilitarianism, was developed into a more extreme form later by Stirner.

Godwin took individualism to the radical extent of opposing individuals performing together in orchestras, writing in Political Justice that "everything understood by the term co-operation is in some sense an evil". He believed democracy to be preferable to other forms of government.

Godwin's political views were diverse and do not perfectly agree with any of the ideologies that claim his influence as writers of the Socialist Standard, organ of the Socialist Party of Great Britain, consider Godwin both an individualist and a communist; Murray Rothbard did not regard Godwin as being in the individualist camp at all, referring to him as the "founder of communist anarchism"; and historian Albert Weisbord considers him an individualist anarchist without reservation.

==== Pierre-Joseph Proudhon ====
Pierre-Joseph Proudhon was the first philosopher to label himself an "anarchist". Some consider Proudhon to be an individualist anarchist while others regard him to be a social anarchist. Some commentators do not identify Proudhon as an individualist anarchist due to his preference for association in large industries rather than individual control.

==== Max Stirner ====
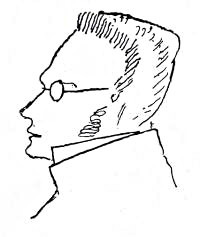
Portrait of Max Stirner by Friedrich Engels

Johann Kaspar Schmidt, better known as Max Stirner (the nom de plume he adopted from a schoolyard nickname he had acquired as a child because of his high brow, in German Stirn), was a German philosopher who ranks as one of the literary fathers of nihilism, existentialism, post-modernism and anarchism, especially of individualist anarchism. Stirner's main work is The Ego and Its Own, also known as The Ego and His Own (Der Einzige und sein Eigentum in German which translates literally as The Only One [individual] and his Property or The Unique Individual and His Property). This work was first published in 1844 in Leipzig and has since appeared in numerous editions and translations.

==== Egoism ====
Max Stirner's philosophy, sometimes called egoism, is a form of individualist anarchism. Stirner was a Hegelian philosopher whose "name appears with familiar regularity in historically oriented surveys of anarchist thought as one of the earliest and best-known exponents of individualist anarchism". In 1844, Stirner's work The Ego and Its Own was published and is considered to be "a founding text in the tradition of individualist anarchism". Stirner does not recommend that the individual try to eliminate the state, but simply that they disregard the state when it conflicts with one's autonomous choices and go along with it when doing so is conducive to one's interests. Stirner says that the egoist rejects pursuit of devotion to "a great idea, a good cause, a doctrine, a system, a lofty calling", arguing that the egoist has no political calling, but rather "lives themselves out" without regard to "how well or ill humanity may fare thereby". Stirner held that the only limitation on the rights of the individual is that individual's power to obtain what he desires. Stirner proposes that most commonly accepted social institutions, including the notion of state, property as a right, natural rights in general and the very notion of "society" as a legal and ideal abstractness, were mere spooks in the mind. Stirner wants to "abolish not only the state but also society as an institution responsible for its members". Stirner advocated self-assertion and foresaw Union of egoists, non-systematic associations which he proposed in as a form of organization in place of the state. A Union is understood as a relation between egoists which is continually renewed by all parties' support through an act of will. Even murder is permissible "if it is right for me", although it is claimed by egoist anarchists that egoism will foster genuine and spontaneous unions between individuals.

Stirner's concept of "egoistic property" not only a lack of moral restraint on how one obtains and uses things, but includes other people as well. His embrace of egotism is in stark contrast to Godwin's altruism. Although Stirner was opposed to communism, for the same reasons he opposed capitalism, humanism, liberalism, property rights and nationalism, seeing them as forms of authority over the individual and as spooks in the mind, he has influenced many anarcho-communists and post-left anarchists. The writers of An Anarchist FAQ report that "many in the anarchist movement in Glasgow, Scotland, took Stirner's 'Union of egoists' literally as the basis for their anarcho-syndicalist organising in the 1940s and beyond". Similarly, the noted anarchist historian Max Nettlau states that "[o]n reading Stirner, I maintain that he cannot be interpreted except in a socialist sense".

This position on property is quite different from the native American, natural law, form of individualist anarchism which defends the inviolability of the private property that has been earned through labor. Other egoists include James L. Walker, Sidney Parker, Dora Marsden and John Beverly Robinson. In Russia, individualist anarchism inspired by Stirner combined with an appreciation for Friedrich Nietzsche attracted a small following of bohemian artists and intellectuals such as Lev Chernyi as well as a few lone wolves who found self-expression in crime and violence. They rejected organizing, believing that only unorganized individuals were safe from coercion and domination, believing this kept them true to the ideals of anarchism. This type of individualist anarchism inspired anarcha-feminist Emma Goldman.

==== Early individualist anarchism in the United States ====
The intentional communal experiments pioneered by Josiah Warren influenced European individualist anarchists of the late 19th and early 20th centuries such as Émile Armand and the intentional communities they founded.

The American version of individualist anarchism has a strong emphasis on the non-aggression principle and individual sovereignty. Some individualist anarchists such as Thoreau do not speak of economics, but simply of the right of "disunion" from the state and foresee the gradual elimination of the state through social evolution.

=== Individualist anarchism in the United States ===
==== Mutualism and utopianism ====
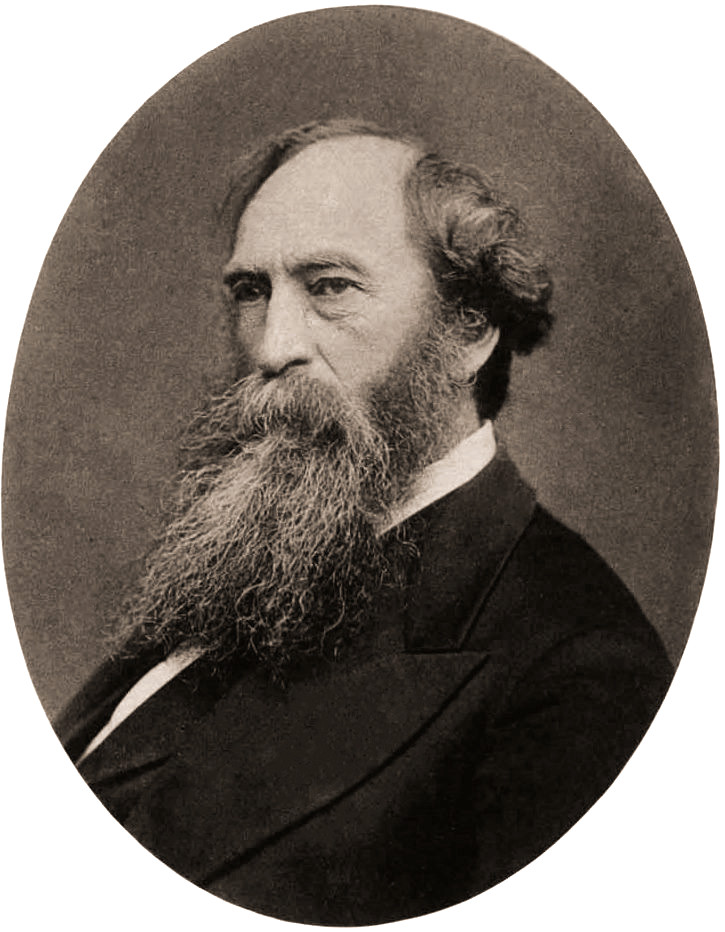
Stephen Pearl Andrews

For American anarchist historian Eunice Minette Schuster, "[i]t is apparent [...] that Proudhonian Anarchism was to be found in the United States at least as early as 1848 and that it was not conscious of its affinity to the Individualist Anarchism of Josiah Warren and Stephen Pearl Andrews [...] William B. Greene presented this Proudhonian Mutualism in its purest and most systematic form". William Batchelder Greene is best known for the works Mutual Banking (1850) which proposed an interest-free banking system and Transcendentalism, a critique of the New England philosophical school. He saw mutualism as the synthesis of "liberty and order". His "associationism [...] is checked by individualism. [...] 'Mind your own business,' 'Judge not that ye be not judged.' Over matters which are purely personal, as for example, moral conduct, the individual is sovereign, as well as over that which he himself produces. For this reason he demands 'mutuality' in marriage—the equal right of a woman to her own personal freedom and property. Within some individualist anarchist circles, mutualism came to mean non-communist anarchism.

==== Boston anarchists ====
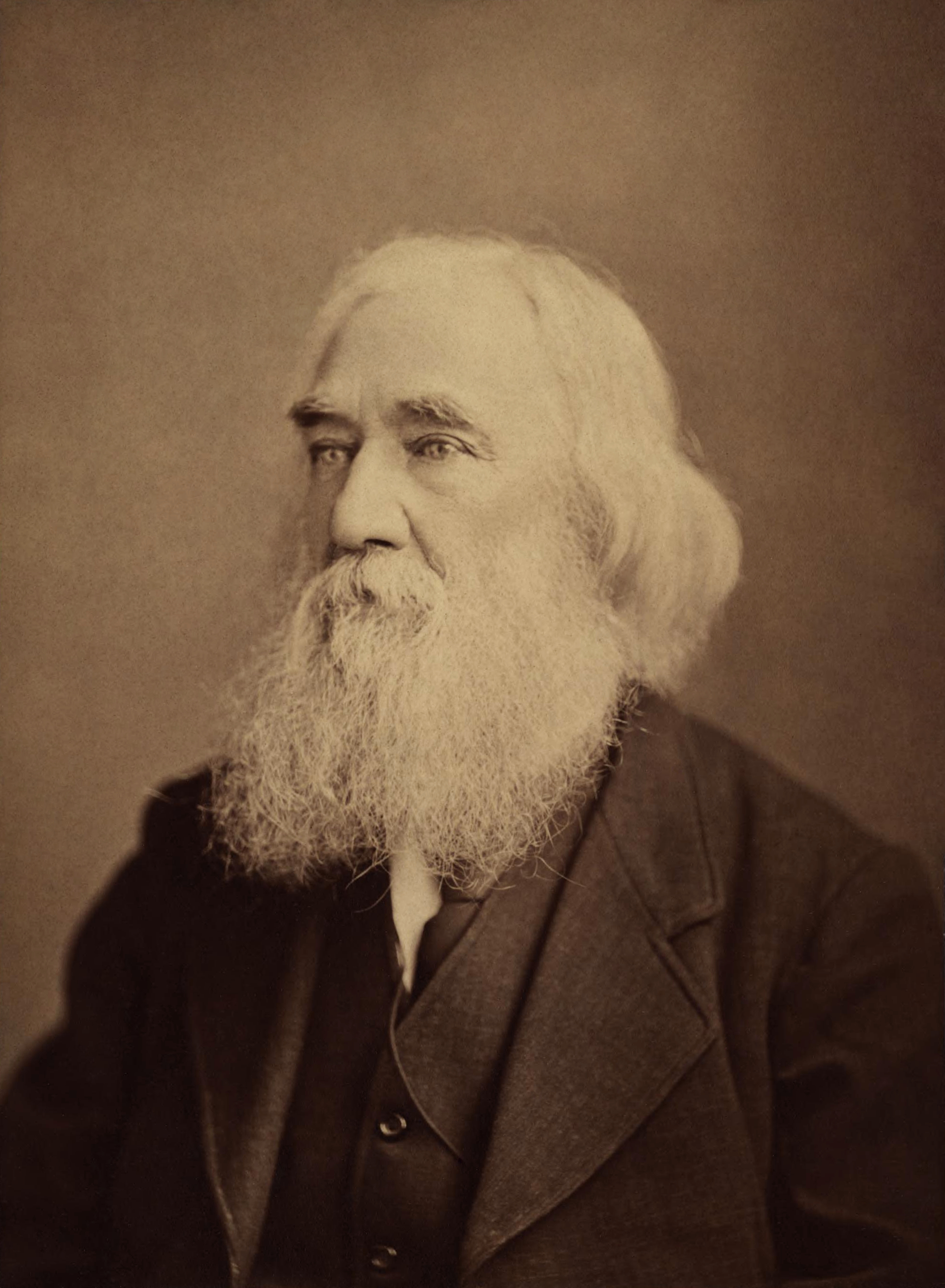
Lysander Spooner by Amory Nelson Hardy

Another form of individualist anarchism was found in the United States as advocated by the so-called Boston anarchists. By default, American individualists had no difficulty accepting the concepts that "one man employ another" or that "he direct him", in his labor but rather demanded that "all natural opportunities requisite to the production of wealth be accessible to all on equal terms and that monopolies arising from special privileges created by law be abolished".

They believed state monopoly capitalism (defined as a state-sponsored monopoly) prevented labor from being fully rewarded.

Lysander Spooner besides his individualist anarchist activism was also an important anti-slavery activist and became a member of the First International.

Some Boston anarchists, including Benjamin Tucker, identified themselves as socialists, which in the 19th century was often used in the sense of a commitment to improving conditions of the working class (i.e. "the labor problem"). The Boston anarchists such as Tucker and his followers continue to be considered socialists due to their opposition to usury. They do so because as the modern economist Jim Stanford points out there are many different kinds of competitive markets such as market socialism and capitalism is only one type of a market economy. By around the start of the 20th century, the heyday of individualist anarchism had passed.

== Individualist anarchism in Europe ==
=== Early precursors ===
==== France ====
From the legacy of Proudhon and Stirner there emerged a strong tradition of French individualist anarchism. An early important individualist anarchist was Anselme Bellegarrigue. He participated in the French Revolution of 1848, was author and editor of Anarchie, Journal de l'Ordre and Au fait ! Au fait ! Interprétation de l'idée démocratique and wrote the important early Anarchist Manifesto in 1850. Catalan historian of individualist anarchism Xavier Diez reports that during his travels in the United States "he at least contacted (Henry David) Thoreau and, probably (Josiah) Warren".

Later, this tradition continued with such intellectuals as Albert Libertad, André Lorulot, Émile Armand, Victor Serge, Zo d'Axa and Rirette Maîtrejean, who in 1905 developed theory in the main individualist anarchist journal in France, L'Anarchie.

In this sense, "the theoretical positions and the vital experiences of [F]rench individualism are deeply iconoclastic and scandalous, even within libertarian circles. The call of nudist naturism, the strong defence of birth control methods, the idea of "unions of egoists" with the sole justification of sexual practices, that will try to put in practice, not without difficulties, will establish a way of thought and action, and will result in sympathy within some, and a strong rejection within others".

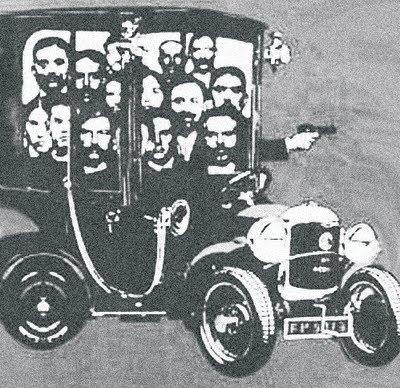
Caricature of the Bonnot gang

Illegalists usually did not seek moral basis for their actions, recognizing only the reality of "might" rather than "right"; and for the most part, illegal acts were done simply to satisfy personal desires, not for some greater ideal. Influenced by theorist Max Stirner's egoism as well as Pierre-Joseph Proudhon (his view that "property is theft!"), Clément Duval and Marius Jacob proposed the theory of la reprise individuelle (individual reclamation) which justified robbery on the rich and personal direct action against exploiters and the system.

==== Germany ====
In Germany, the Scottish-German John Henry Mackay became the most important propagandist for individualist anarchist ideas. He fused Stirnerist egoism with the positions of Benjamin Tucker and actually translated Tucker into German. Two semi-fictional writings of his own, Die Anarchisten and Der Freiheitsucher, contributed to individualist theory through an updating of egoist themes within a consideration of the anarchist movement. English translations of these works arrived in the United Kingdom and in individualist American circles led by Tucker. Stirnerist individualism was popular among literary and intellectual anarchists in pre-WWI Germany, for instance influencing the expressionist movement and the early thought of Otto Gross.

==== Italy ====
In Italy, individualist anarchism had a strong tendency towards illegalism and violent propaganda by the deed similar to French individualist anarchism, but perhaps more extreme and which emphazised criticism of organization be it anarchist or of other type.

==== Russia ====
Individualist anarchism was one of the three categories of anarchism in Russia, along with the more prominent anarcho-communism and anarcho-syndicalism. The ranks of the Russian individualist anarchists were predominantly drawn from the intelligentsia and the working class. For anarchist historian Paul Avrich, "[t]he two leading exponents of individualist anarchism, both based in Moscow, were Aleksei Alekseevich Borovoi and Lev Chernyi (born Pavel Dmitrievich Turchaninov). From Nietzsche, they inherited the desire for a complete overturn of all values accepted by bourgeois society political, moral, and cultural. Furthermore, strongly influenced by Max Stirner and Benjamin Tucker, the German and American theorists of individualist anarchism, they demanded the total liberation of the human personality from the fetters of organized society".

Some Russian individualists anarchists "found the ultimate expression of their social alienation in violence and crime, others attached themselves to avant-garde literary and artistic circles, but the majority remained "philosophical" anarchists who conducted animated parlor discussions and elaborated their individualist theories in ponderous journals and books".

Lev Chernyi advocated a Nietzschean overthrow of the values of bourgeois Russian society, and rejected the voluntary communes of anarcho-communist Peter Kropotkin as a threat to the freedom of the individual. Scholars including Avrich and Allan Antliff have interpreted this vision of society to have been greatly influenced by the individualist anarchists Max Stirner and Benjamin Tucker.

==== Spain ====
While Spain was influenced by American individualist anarchism, it was more closely related to the French currents. Around the start of the 20th century, individualism in Spain gathered force through the efforts of people such as Dorado Montero, Ricardo Mella, Federico Urales, Miguel Giménez Igualada, Mariano Gallardo and J. Elizalde who translated French and American individualists. Important in this respect were also magazines such as La Idea Libre, La Revista Blanca, Etica, Iniciales, Al margen, Estudios and Nosotros. The most influential thinkers there were Max Stirner, Émile Armand and Han Ryner. Just as in France, the spread of Esperanto and anationalism had importance just as naturism and free love currents. Later, Armand and Ryner themselves started writing in the Spanish individualist press. Armand's concept of amorous camaraderie had an important role in motivating polyamory as realization of the individual.

Catalan historian Xavier Diez reports that the Spanish individualist anarchist press was widely read by members of anarcho-communist groups and by members of the anarcho-syndicalist trade union CNT. There were also the cases of prominent individualist anarchists such as Federico Urales and Miguel Giménez Igualada who were members of the CNT and J. Elizalde who was a founding member and first secretary of the Iberian Anarchist Federation (IAF).

Between October 1937 and February 1938, Spanish individualist anarchist Miguel Giménez Igualada was editor of the individualist anarchist magazine Nosotros in which many works of Armand and Ryner appeared. He also participated in the publishing of another individualist anarchist magazine Al Margen: Publicación quincenal individualista. In his youth, he engaged in illegalist activities. His thought was deeply influenced by Max Stirner, of which he was the main popularizer in Spain through his own writings. He published and wrote the preface to the fourth edition in Spanish of The Ego and Its Own from 1900. He proposed the creation of a "Union of egoists" to be a federation of individualist anarchists in Spain, but it did not succeed.

Federico Urales was an important individualist anarchist who edited La Revista Blanca. The individualist anarchism of Urales was influenced by Auguste Comte and Charles Darwin. He saw science and reason as a defense against blind servitude to authority. He was critical of influential individualist thinkers such as Nietzsche and Stirner for promoting an asocial egoist individualism and instead promoted an individualism with solidarity seen as a way to guarantee social equality and harmony. He was highly critical of anarcho-syndicalism, which he viewed as plagued by excessive bureaucracy; and he thought that it tended towards reformism. Instead, he favored small groups based on ideological alignment. He supported and participated in the establishment of the IAF in 1927.

In 2000, Ateneo Libertario Ricardo Mella, Ateneo Libertario Al Margen, Ateneu Enciclopèdic Popular, Ateneo Libertario de Sant Boi and Ateneu Llibertari Poble Sec y Fundació D'Estudis Llibertaris i Anarcosindicalistes republished Émile Armand's writings on free love and individualist anarchism in a compilation titled Individualist anarchism and Amorous camaraderie.

=== Individualist anarchism in Latin America ===
Argentine anarchist historian Ángel Cappelletti reports that in Argentina "[a]mong the workers that came from Europe in the 2 first decades of the century, there was curiously some stirnerian individualists influenced by the philosophy of Nietzsche, that saw syndicalism as a potential enemy of anarchist ideology. They established [...] affinity groups that in 1912 came to, according to Max Nettlau, to the number of 20. In 1911 there appeared, in Colón, the periodical El Único, that defined itself as 'Publicación individualista'".

== Developments and expansion ==
=== Anarcha-feminism, free love, freethought and LGBT issues ===
In Europe, interest in free love developed in French and Spanish individualist anarchist circles: "Anticlericalism, just as in the rest of the libertarian movement, is another of the frequent elements which will gain relevance related to the measure in which the (French) Republic begins to have conflicts with the church [...] Anti-clerical discourse, frequently called for by the french individualist André Lorulot, will have its impacts in Estudios (a Spanish individualist anarchist publication). There will be an attack on institutionalized religion for the responsibility that it had in the past on negative developments, for its irrationality which makes it a counterpoint of philosophical and scientific progress. There will be a criticism of proselitism and ideological manipulation which happens on both believers and agnostics". This tendencies will continue in French individualist anarchism in the work and activism of Charles-Auguste Bontemps and others. In the Spanish individualist anarchist magazine Ética and Iniciales, "there is a strong interest in publishing scientific news, usually linked to a certain atheist and anti-theist obsession, philosophy which will also work for pointing out the incompatibility between science and religion, faith and reason. In this way there will be a lot of talk on Darwin's theories or on the negation of the existence of the soul".

=== Anarcho-naturism ===
Individualist anarchist groups also were affiliated with naturism and individualist anarchist Henri Zisly promoted naturism in France.

=== Individualist anarchism and anarcho-capitalism ===
While anarcho-capitalism is sometimes described as a form of individualist anarchism, some scholars have criticized those, including some Marxists and right-libertarians, for taking it at face value. Other scholars such as Benjamin Franks, who considers anarcho-capitalism part of individualist anarchism and hence excludes those forms of individualist anarchism that defend or reinforce hierarchical forms from the anarchist camp, have been criticized by those who include individualist anarchism as part of the anarchist and socialist traditions whilst excluding anarcho-capitalism, including the authors of An Anarchist FAQ. Some anarchist scholars criticized those, especially in Anglo-American philosophy, who define anarchism only in terms of opposition to the state, when anarchism, including both individualist and social traditions, is much more than that. Anarchists, including both individualist and social anarchists, also criticized some Marxists and other socialists for excluding anarchism from the socialist camp. In European Socialism: A History of Ideas and Movements, Carl Landauer summarized the difference between communist and individualist anarchists by stating that "the communist anarchists also do not acknowledge any right to society to force the individual. They differ from the anarchistic individualists in their belief that men, if freed from coercion, will enter into voluntary associations of a communistic type, while the other wing believes that the free person will prefer a high degree of isolation".

Without the labor theory of value, some argue that 19th-century individualist anarchists approximate the modern movement of anarcho-capitalism, although this has been contested or rejected. As economic theory changed, the popularity of the labor theory of classical economics was superseded by the subjective theory of value of neoclassical economics and Murray Rothbard, a student of Ludwig von Mises, combined Mises' Austrian School of economics with the absolutist views of human rights and rejection of the state he had absorbed from studying the individualist American anarchists of the 19th century such as Tucker and Spooner. In the mid-1950s, Rothbard was concerned with differentiating himself from communist and socialistic economic views of other anarchists, including the individualist anarchists of the 19th century, arguing that "we are not anarchists [...] but not archists either [...]. Perhaps, then, we could call ourselves by a new name: nonarchist".

There is a strong current within anarchism including anarchist activists and scholars which rejects that anarcho-capitalism can be considered a part of the anarchist movement because anarchism has historically been an anti-capitalist movement and anarchists see it as incompatible with capitalist forms. Although some regard anarcho-capitalism as a form of individualist anarchism, others contend individualist anarchism is largely socialistic and contest the concept of a socialist–individualist divide. Some writers deny that anarcho-capitalism is a form of anarchism and that capitalism is compatible with anarchism.

George Bernard Shaw initially had flirtations with individualist anarchism before coming to the conclusion that it was "the negation of socialism, and is, in fact, unsocialism carried as near to its logical conclusion as any sane man dare carry it". Shaw's argument was that even if wealth was initially distributed equally, the degree of laissez-faire advocated by Tucker would result in the distribution of wealth becoming unequal because it would permit private appropriation and accumulation. According to Carlotta Anderson, American individualist anarchists accept that free competition results in unequal wealth distribution, but they "do not see that as an injustice". Nonetheless, Peter Marshall states that "the egalitarian implications of traditional individualist anarchists" such as Tucker and Lysander Spooner have been overlooked.

Collectivist and social anarchists dispute the individualist anarchist claim that free competition and markets would yield the libertarian-egalitarian anarchist society that individualist anarchists share with them. In their views, "state intervention merely props up a system of class exploitation and gives capitalism a human face".

The authors of An Anarchist FAQ argue that individualist anarchists did not advocate free competition and markets as normative claims and merely thought those were better means than the ones proposed by anarcho-communists for the development of an anarchist society. Individualist anarchists such as Tucker thought interests, profits, rents and usury would disappear, something that both anarcho-capitalists and social anarchists did not think was true or believe would not happen. In a free market, people would be paid in proportion to how much labor they exerted and exploitation or usury was taking place if they were not. The theory was that unregulated banking would cause more money to be available and that this would allow proliferation of new businesses which would in turn raise demand for labor. This led Tucker to believe that the labor theory of value would be vindicated and equal amounts of labor would receive equal pay. Later in his life, Tucker grew skeptical that free competition could remove concentrated capital.

== See also ==
- Anarchism and Friedrich Nietzsche#Individualist anarchism

== Bibliography ==
- Baker, Zoe (2023), Means and Ends: The Revolutionary Practice of Anarchism in Europe and the United States, Edinburgh: AK PRESS, ISBN 978-1-84935-498-1
- Beaudet, Céline (2006), Les milieux libres : Vivre en anarchiste à la belle époque en France, Paris: Les Editions Libertaires, doi:10.17863/CAM.80240
- Díez, Xavier (2006). "La insumisión voluntaria. El anarquismo individualista español durante la dictadura y la segund arepública (1923-1938)". Germinal: Revista de estudios libertarios (in Spanish) (1): 23–58. ISSN 1886-3019.
- Díez, Xavier (2007). El anarquismo individualista en España 1923–1938 (in Spanish). Barcelona: Virus Editorial. ISBN 978-84-96044-87-6. Archived from the original on March 23, 2021.
- Frayne, Carl Tobias (2022), Individualist Anarchism in France and Its Legacy (PhD thesis), Cambridge: University of Cambridge, doi:10.17863/CAM.80240
- Marshall, Peter (1992). Demanding the Impossible: A History of Anarchism. London: HarperCollins. ISBN 978-0-00-217855-6.
- Parry, Richard (1987). The Bonnot Gang. London: Rebel Press. ISBN 0-946061-04-1.
- Woodcock, George (1962). Anarchism: A History of Libertarian Ideas and Movements. Cleveland: World Publishing Company. OCLC 911230882.
