= Rohan bombing =

Terrorist incident in Paris, France

Coordinates: 48°51′46″N 2°20′07″E

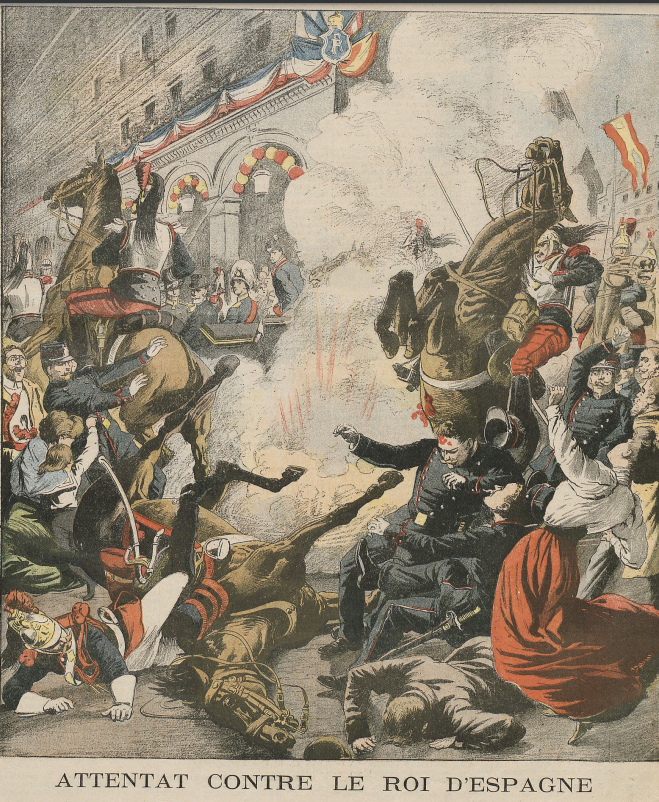
- Representation of the Rohan bombing in Le Petit Journal (6 June 1905)
- Location: Paris, France
- Date: 31 May 1905
- Weapon: bomb
- Deaths: 0
- Injuries: 21
- Perpetrator: Alexandre Farras (?)
- Motive: Anarchism
- Accused: 4
- Verdict: Not guilty
- Convicted: 0

The Rohan bombing, sometimes referred to as the Louvre attack, was an anarchist attack that occurred on 31 May 1905, at the intersection of Rue de Rohan and Rue de Rivoli in Paris. It targeted the King of Spain, Alfonso XIII and French President Émile Loubet. It killed nobody while injuring twenty-one. Presumably organized by Catalan anarchists, the police arrested four suspects following the attack. The suspects had no real connection to the bombing, apart from being left-wing or anarchist, and all were acquitted. The main suspect, a certain Aviño, known to French police as Alexandre Farras, remained at large and was never taken.

== History ==
=== Context ===
Alfonso XIII was visiting Paris when the French police became aware of a Catalan anarchist plot to assassinate him, either on the route to Paris or in Paris itself.

=== Events ===
The king and the president were traveling through the capital on 31 May 1905. As their procession reached the intersection of Rue de Rohan and Rue de Rivoli, two bombs were thrown at it from the crowd. The bombs hit the procession, exploded, and severely injured the horses in the escort, killing one. In total, 21 people were injured in the explosion, but no one was killed. Amid the ensuing chaos, the procession managed to escape the crowd, which apprehended several individuals suspected of participating in the attack.

=== After ===
The individuals arrested afterward were 'two Frenchmen, Charles Malato and Caussanel, an Englishman, Harvey, and a Spanish activist, Pedro Vallina'. According to the police, they were believed to be part of a conspiracy alongside the main suspect. They remained in custody until their trial in December 1905 and were eventually all acquitted, as there was no clear evidence linking them to the attack, apart from their leftist or anarchist affiliations.

The police suspected a certain Alexandre Farras, possibly a pseudonym for someone named Aviño, and distributed photographs and sketches of the main suspect to customs offices, ports, and other points of transit. Despite these efforts, he was never apprehended and vanished without a trace.

== Primary sources ==
=== Anarchist literature ===
- Du fort d’Usseau à la rue de Rohan, 15 June 1905, by Michel Antoine in L'Anarchie
