= Hank Thompson =

Hank Thompson may refer to:

- Hank Thompson (baseball) (1925–1969), American third baseman
- Hank Thompson (musician) (1925–2007), country music singer and songwriter

== See also ==
- Henry Thompson (disambiguation)
