= Harry Thomson =

Harry Thomson may refer to:

- Harry Thomson (footballer) (1940–2013), Scottish footballer
- Harry Thomson (politician) (1934–2019), Malawian businessman and politician

== See also ==
- Harry Thomason (born 1940), American film and television producer and director
- Henry Thomson (disambiguation)
- Harry Thompson (disambiguation)
