= Maîtrejean =

Maîtrejean is a French surname. Notable people with the surname include:

- Corinne Maîtrejean (born 1979), French foil fencer
- Rirette Maîtrejean (1887–1968), French anarchist and feminist
