= Pedro Vallina =

Spanish doctor and anarchist

Pedro Vallina Martínez
- Born: 1879; Guadalcanal, Spain
- Died: 1970 (aged 90–91); Veracruz, Mexico
- Occupations: Doctor, militiaman
- Movement: Anarchism

Pedro Vallina Martínez (Guadalcanal, Seville province, Spain, 1879 - Veracruz, Mexico, 1970) was a Spanish doctor and anarchist. He studied medicine in Sevilla, Cádiz, Paris and London (in the last two cities, exiled). From a young age he developed an anarchist political ideology, especially after his contact with Fermín Salvochea in Cádiz. He was imprisoned and exiled several times for his political activity.

== Biography ==
=== Education and early life ===
He was born into a relatively wealthy family where his parents ran a candy shop. Federal republicanism still had a great imprint on the Andalusian countryside at that time, and the comfortable economic position of the Vallina family allowed their children to be educated in the most progressive trends of the time.

At a young age he left for Seville to begin his studies in medicine. Already considering himself an anarchist, he then arrived in Cádiz at the age of 19, where he met Fermín Salvochea, on his release from prison (1898 or 1899). Together, they went to Madrid a year later, where Vallina became involved with anarchist and Pimargalian circles. He was also a friend of Nicolás Salmerón y García.

=== Legal problems and exile ===
During his stay in Madrid he got in problems with the judicial authorities (for example in the case called "Complot de la Coronación", a failed plan to attack the day of the coronation of Alfonso XIII) and spent some time in prison. He finally had to flee Spain and went into exile in Paris in 1902. Vallina was one of the four suspects arrested following the 31 May 1905 Rohan bombing, an anarchist attack which was unsuccessful in harming its intended target, Alfonso XIII, the King of Spain. All four arrested suspects were acquitted. The continuation of Vallina's revolutionary activities in France, (where he established relations, among others, with Louise Michel), led to his expulsion from France. In 1906 he arrived in England as a political refugee. This country became in the late 19th and early 20th centuries a haven for revolutionaries from around the world, who in turn did not conspire against the British monarchy. He settled in London and was a regular in the city's Jewish Anarchist Circle, establishing relationships with figures such as Rudolf Rocker, Errico Malatesta and Piotr Kropotkin. He continued his studies in medicine from there.

=== Return to Spain ===
Shortly after the start of the First World War, a general gave him amnesty to return to Spain; although the continuity of his activities condemned him to internal exile in Peñalsordo (Badajoz) in 1919, from where he was once again exiled (due to his nice treatment by locals) to other towns in Extremadura and Navarra. Around this time he joined the Confederación Nacional del Trabajo (CNT) and belonged to its National Committee, based in Seville. During the dictatorship of Primo de Rivera, he was imprisoned and later exiled in Tangier and Casablanca. Before his exile, thanks to the subscriptions to his newspaper "El Noticiero Sevillano", he created in 1923 the "Vida" Tuberculosis Sanatorium close to Cantillana, the town of his mother's family. There he provided medical care for free to the sick who did not have financial means. For him, as a doctor, it was necessary to cure diseases and -at the same time- fight against the causes that provoked it. He returned to live in the Sanatorium after the proclamation of the Second Republic, from 1932 onward.

He was the link in Seville for a revolutionary committee created in Madrid to proclaim the Second Republic. He spent much of his life during the Second Republic in Seville, at the Cantillana Tuberculosis Sanatorium. During this period a controversy with other anarchists broke out regarding his stance against the structure of the CNT and his support and candidacy with Blas Infante. Throughout the Second Republic he continued his activity as a doctor, as an inseparable part of his humanist anarchism.

=== Spanish Civil War, second exile ===
He actively participated in the defense of the Republic from the very beginning. When the military uprising against the Republic took place, he fled to the republican zone and organized the resistance in various towns, participating in it as a militiaman, as a doctor and later as a soldier. As Director of the "El Cañizar" military hospital, which he helped to organize from the beginning in the municipality of Cañete (Cuenca), he took care for the wounded from the war front that stretched between Cuenca and Teruel.

After the defeat of the Republic, he crossed the border to France where he was interned but he then managed to get in a boat to Mexico where he served as a doctor for indigenous communities until his death in 1970.
