= Fermín Salvochea =

Spanish mayor and anarchist

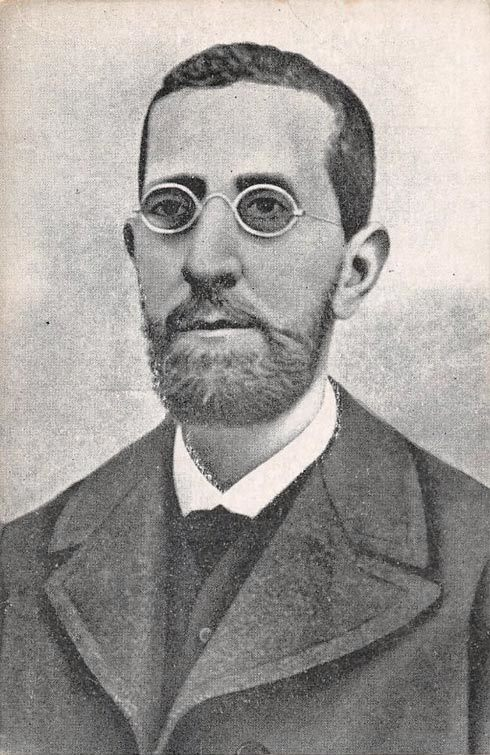
- Born: March 1, 1842; Cádiz, Spain
- Died: September 27, 1907 (aged 65); Cádiz, Spain
- Occupation: politician
- Known for: mayor of Cadiz, president of province of Cadiz

Fermín Salvochea y Álvarez (1 March 1842, in Cádiz – 27 September 1907, in Cádiz) was a mayor of the city of Cádiz and a president of the province of Cádiz. He was one of the main propagators of anarchist thought in that area in the late 19th century and is considered to be "perhaps the most beloved figure in the Spanish Anarchist movement of the 19th century".

Ideologically, he was influenced by Bradlaugh, Owen and Paine, whose works he had studied during his stay in England, and Kropotkin, whom he read later. In Spain he had contact with anarchist thinkers and activists and members of the Bakuninist Alliance, including Anselmo Lorenzo, Pedro Vallina and Francisco Mora (anarchist).

== Biography ==
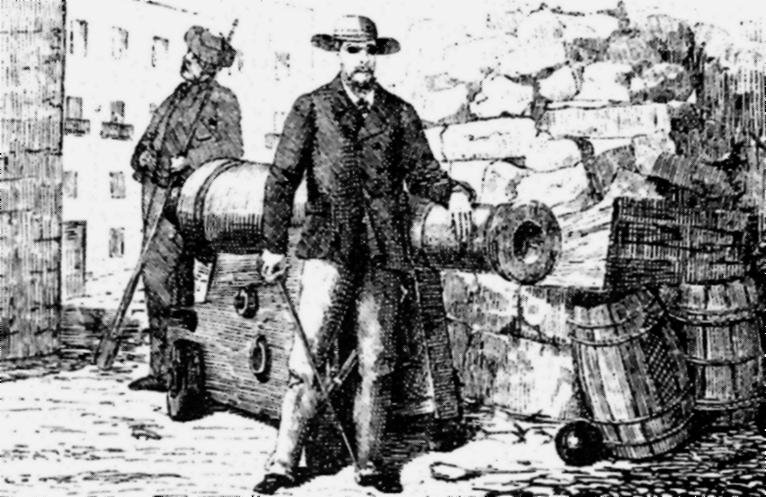
Engraving of Salvochea from 1868

He was born in the Plaza de las Viudas to a family originally from Navarre. His paternal grandfather had established himself in Cádiz after emigrating from Navarre, to engage in commerce. His mother, Pilar Alvarez, was the cousin of Juan Álvarez Mendizábal.

Following the traditions of the mercantile bourgeoisie of Cádiz to which the family belonged, when Salvochea was 15 his father sent him to England to become familiar with the ways of commerce. Fermín stayed in London and Liverpool for five years. But he was more devoted to studying the social problems of the time than the mercantile trade. He read the works of Owen, Paine and Berdlow.

Being the leader of the Canton of Cádiz at the end of Cantonal Revolution, he was captured by the troops of General Pavia in Seville, tried and sentenced to life imprisonment. He remained for several years in detention in Peñón de Vélez de la Gomera and Ceuta. After refusing the pardon that he was granted by the council of Cádiz in 1883, he escaped to Morocco. Disenchanted by politics and parliamentarianism, it was during his years in prison and in exile (after his escape which took him to France), when he firmly became an anarchist of the anarchist communism school.

Upon the death of Alfonso XII he was granted amnesty again and he returned to Cádiz, where he founded the newspaper El Socialismo, which published, among other items, the anarchist communist ideas of Kropotkin, thus introducing anarcho-communist thinking among the Spaniards.

During his life, he often renounced his heritage and family possessions and delivered it to the most needy. He lived in destitution and away from material luxury.

Back in Cádiz, his last work was a translation of Kropotkin's Fields, Factories and Workshops. He died on 28 September 1907, after falling from the table that was serving as his bed. His funeral was a great demonstration of popular grief with about fifty thousand people, mostly workmen from the Cádiz and Jerez areas, in attendance.

== Legacy ==
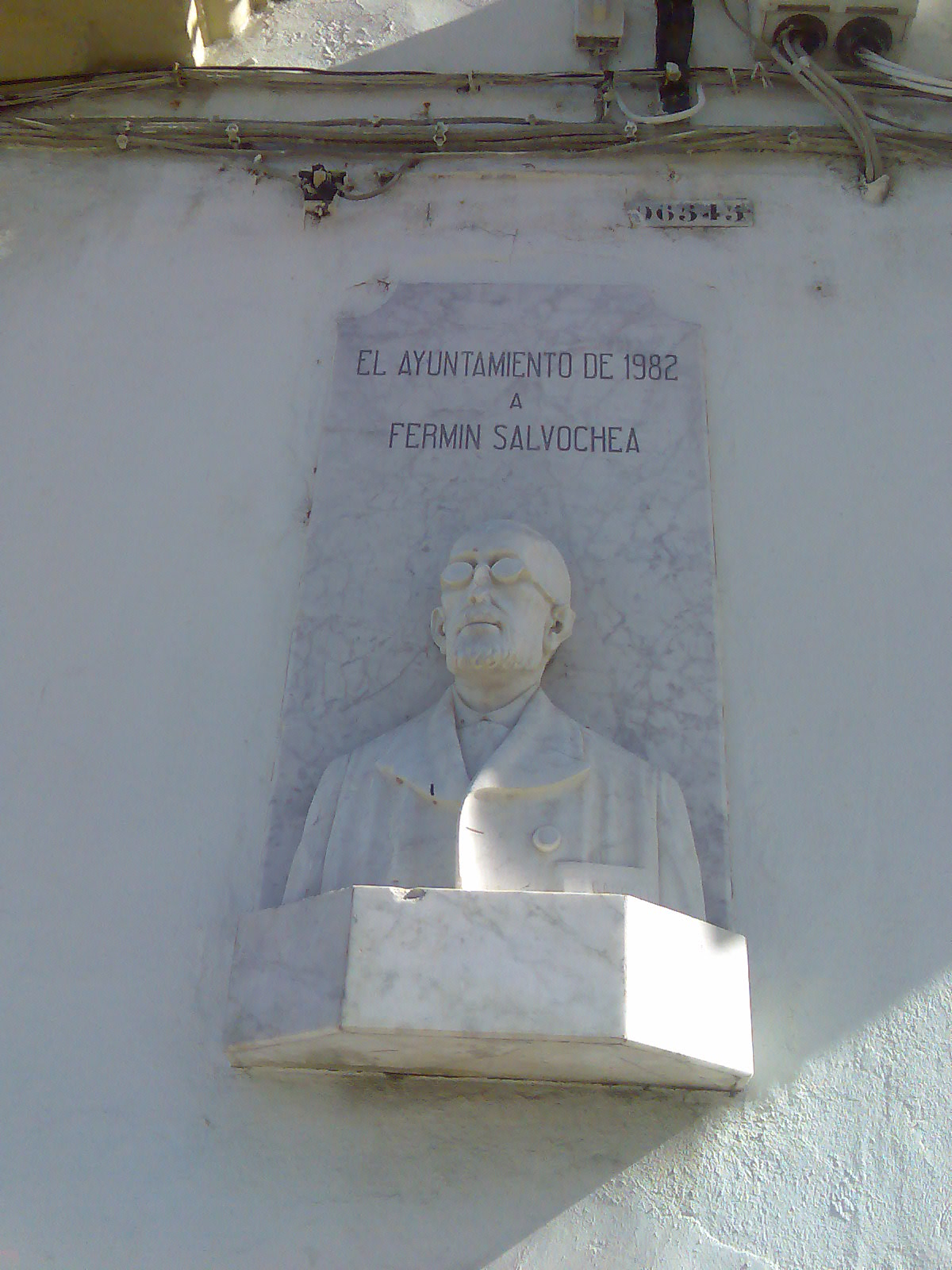
Bust of Fermín Salvochea portal next to Number 10, Plaza de Argüelles, Cádiz

Murray Bookchin describes Salvochea's life as spanning the early anarchist movement through the rise of anarcho-syndicalism.

The anarchist historian Manuel Buenacasa Tomeo called Salvochea "nuestro santo mayor" - "our greatest saint". His image as a "saintly" figure is in contrast to some of the other elements in the anarchist movement like Paulí Pallàs who employed more terroristic tactics.

== See also ==
- Anarchism in Spain
- List of mayors of Cádiz
