= Harry Arnall-Thompson =

English cricketer (1864–1916)

Personal information
- Full name: Harry Thompson Arnall-Thompson
- Born: 7 April 1864; Belgrave Grange, Leicester
- Died: 28 December 1916 (aged 52); Anstey Frith, Leicester
- Source: Cricinfo, 18 March 2017

Harry Arnall-Thompson (7 April 1864 – 28 December 1916) was an English cricketer. He played six first-class matches for Oxford University Cricket Club, Marylebone Cricket Club, and the Gentlemen of England between 1885 and 1887. He was born Harry Thompson Arnall and changed his name to Harry Thompson Arnall-Thompson in December 1885. He was educated at Rugby School and Brasenose College, Oxford.

== See also ==
- List of Oxford University Cricket Club players
