= Charles Malato =

French anarchist (1857–1938)

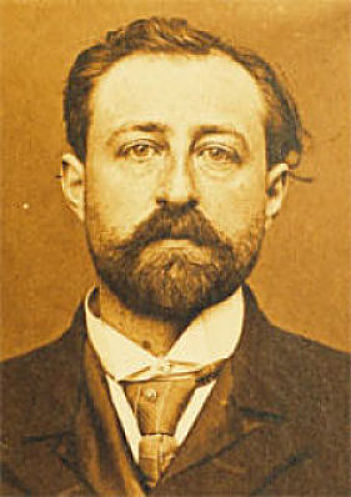
Charles Malato

Charles Malato (1857–1938) was a French anarchist and writer.

== Biography ==
He was born to a noble Neapolitan family, his grandfather Count Malato being a Field Marshal and the Commander-in-Chief of the army of the last King of Naples. Though Count Malato ferociously suppressed a popular anti-dynastic insurrection, his son – Charles' father – supported the communards of the Paris Commune, and was banished as a result to the penal colony of New Caledonia, where Charles was born. After the amnesty of anarchists and communists, Charles and his by that time ninety-year-old father returned to Paris, where they immersed themselves in the anarchist movement.

On his return to France, Malato was tried alongside Ernest Gégout for publishing an article providing instructions on how to make bombs. They were sentenced to fifteen months in prison but remained free while awaiting their appeal trial. As they left the courthouse, they were arrested again on the steps and taken back into custody. Pierre Martinet, who had arrived in front of the courthouse to pick them up, saw the anarchists fighting with the police and joined them—all three were arrested.

He then managed to go into exile in London.

Malato collaborated briefly with Victor Henri Rochefort, Marquis de Rochefort-Luçay before they fell out over the Dreyfus affair (Rochefort was an anti-Dreyfusard). He wrote for Georges Clemenceau's L'Aurore, L'Humanité, and the Journal du peuple (with Sébastien Faure) and partook in a revolutionary committee against nationalist activities. According to The New York Times, Malato wrote articles "remarkable for their literary grace", was well known in political and literary circles, and "noted for the perfection of his manners".

He was accused by French police in 1905 of organising an assassination attempt, the Rohan bombing, against King Alfonso XIII of Spain, but was acquitted. Between 1907 and 1914, Malato wrote in the journals La Guerre Sociale and La Bataille Syndicaliste, and became friends with the anarchist educator Francisco Ferrer.

At the outset of World War I, Malato was a supporter of the union sacrée and a signatory of the pro-Allies Manifesto of the Sixteen.

== Publications ==
- Joyeusetés de l’exil
- La Grande Grève
- "Le Nouveau Faust" Edité à Barcelone 'La Esculela Moderna' 1919, a philosophical-fantastical drama with illustrations by Robert Louis Antral. A volume in-12 of 78 pp., cover illustrated in colour.
