= Henry Thomson (cricketer) =

English cricketer

Henry Shepherd Thomson (4 June 1854 – 19 July 1899) was an English cricketer who played in two first-class cricket matches for Kent County Cricket Club in 1876.

Thomson was born in Ramsgate in Kent, the son of John Thomson, a surgeon, and his second wife Margaret. He worked as a solicitor in Ramsgate. Thomson married Annie Buckley in 1881. The family emigrated to South Africa after their three children were born.

Thomson died after being hit by a locomotive in Cape Town harbour in July 1899 aged 45.

== Bibliography ==
- Carlaw, Derek (2020). Kent County Cricketers, A to Z: Part One (1806–1914) (PDF). Cardiff: ACS.
