= Henry Thompson (footballer) =

English footballer

Personal information
- Full name: Henry Thompson
- Date of birth: 1886
- Place of birth: South Hetton, England
- Position: Left back

Senior career*
Years	Team	Apps	(Gls)
- North Shields Athletic
1908–1910	Newcastle United	2	(0)
1910–1911	Crystal Palace		
- * Club domestic league appearances and goals

Henry Thompson was an English professional footballer who played as a left back in the Football League for Newcastle United.

== Personal life ==
Thompson served in the Royal Garrison Artillery during the First World War.

== Career statistics ==
Appearances and goals by club, season and competition
Club	Season	League			FA Cup		Total	
Club	Season	Division	Apps	Goals	Apps	Goals	Apps	Goals
Newcastle United	1909–10	First Division	2	0	0	0	2	0
Career total			2	0	0	0	2	0
