= André Lorulot =

French individualist anarchist (1885–1963)

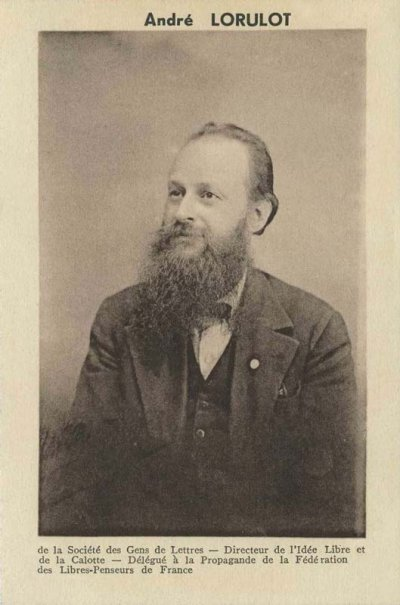
- Born: Georges André Roulot; 23 October 1885; Palais-Bourbon, Paris, Seine, French Third Republic
- Died: 11 March 1963 (aged 77); Herblay, Seine-et-Oise, French Fifth Republic
- Movement: Anarchism

André Lorulot (born Georges André Roulot; 23 October 1885 in Palais-Bourbon, Paris – 11 March 1963 in Herblay, Seine-et-Oise) was a French individualist anarchist and freethinker. He founded and edited several newspapers in his lifetime. Later in his life, he abandoned anarchism to become a freethought propagandist.
