= Marius Jacob =

French anarchist illegalist

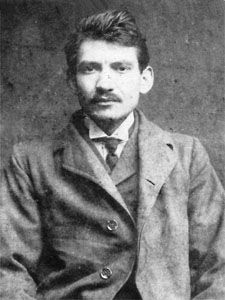
Marius Jacob in 1905

Alexandre Marius Jacob (1879–1954), also known by the names Georges, Escande, Férau, Jean Concorde, Attila, and Barrabas, was a French anarchist and illegalist.

== Biography ==
Jacob was born in 1879 in Marseille to a working-class family; his father, Joseph, was a baker. At the age of eleven, he signed up as a sailor's apprentice; he would later say, "I have seen the world; it is not beautiful." Back in Marseilles, on 31 March 1899, Jacob stole from a pawn shop, his first action as an illegalist. He was later arrested in Toulon and faked insanity to avoid five years of prison. On 19 April 1900, he escaped from the Montperrin asylum in Aix-en-Provence with the assistance of a nurse, Royère, and took refuge in Sète. There, he organized a band of men, calling them "the workers of the night". The principles were simple: one does not kill, except to protect his life and his freedom from the police. A percentage of the stolen money was to be invested into the anarchist cause.

Roughly 150 burglaries have been attributed to Jacob. He made headlines not just for the clever burglaries themselves but also for the mocking notes the gang would leave behind. One such note, left at the church of Saint Sever in Rouen on 14 February 1901, read "Dieu des voleurs, recherche les voleurs de ceux qui en ont volé d’autres" ("God of thieves, look for the thieves of those who have stolen from others").

The gang had several clashes with police. In Orléans, on 27 February 1901, Jacob shot a police officer in order to escape. His friend and accomplice Royère was arrested. Various gang members were arrested from 1901 to 1903. On 21 April 1903, an operation carried out in Abbeville turned sour. Having killed a police officer in order to escape, Jacob and his two accomplices were captured. Two years later in Amiens, Jacob appeared in court, with 23 co-accused. He turned out to be a fierce rhetorician, and the trial gave him a platform for his ideas, among them "Le droit de vivre ne se mendie pas, il se prend" ("The right to life cannot be begged for, it must be taken"). He spoke of robbing priests and finding that each one had a safe, sometimes several, containing money that had been given by parishioners to the church but kept by the priests themselves.

The court sentenced him to forced labour for life on 22 March 1905. He was sent to the Salvation Islands. He was frequently brought before the prison courts for escape attempts, and also in 1908 for murder (of a fellow convict, Capelletti), and spent three years in prison on Île Saint-Joseph. Throughout his imprisonment, he maintained correspondence with his mother Marie, who campaigned for her son's release among increasing public criticism of the penal colony. On 14 July 1925, the then French president Gaston Doumergue commuted Jacob's sentence to five years' imprisonment to be served in France. He was released on 31 December 1927.

After his release, Jacob at first worked in Paris before becoming a travelling salesman in 1931. In 1936, he went to Barcelona in the hopes of aiding the syndicalist CNT but soon returned to France. His mother died in 1941. He desired "to die in good health" rather than of old age. In a letter of 17 August 1954, he wrote, "J'ai vécu, je puis mourir" ("I have lived, I can die"); he died in Reuilly, Indre, on 28 August. While he never renounced his anarchist and anti-fascist convictions, he expressed doubt regarding the merits of illegalism at the end of his life.

== Bibliography ==
- Écrits by Alexandre Marius Jacob, Insomniaque, 2004.

== Sources ==
- Marius Jacob, the Anarchist Cambrioleur by William Caruchet, Séguier editions, 1993.
- Un anarchiste de la Belle Epoque by Alain Sergent, 2016.
- Lives of Alexandre Jacob 1879-1954 by Bernard Thomas, Fayard, 1970; Mazarine, 1998.
- Alexandre Jacob l'honnête cambrioleur by Jean-Marc Delpech, Atelier de création libertaire, 2008.
