= Illegalism =

European anarchist philosophy

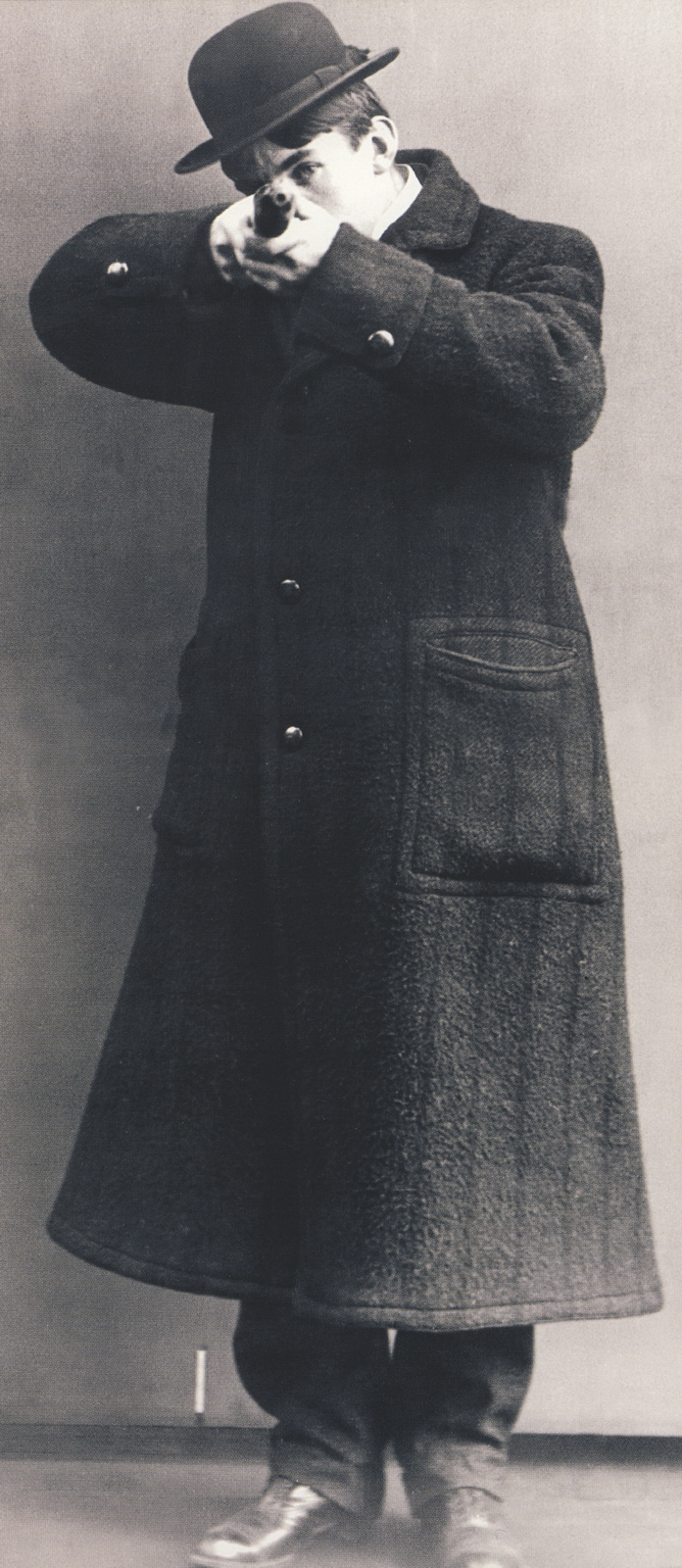
André Soudy, a member of the Bonnot Gang, 1911

Illegalism is a tendency within anarchism that emerged in certain parts of Europe, especially Italy and France, in the last decades of the 19th century. Closely linked to and dependent on individualist anarchism, it encompasses anarchists who aim to carry out their struggle through criminal acts using the idea of individual reclamation. This concept is the idea that since capitalists would steal from the people, it would be legitimate to steal back from capitalists. Illegalists are generally characterized by their strong commitment to this principle of individual reclamation.

Historically, illegalism appeared in the 1870s and 1880s following the actions of, among others, Clément Duval, Vittorio Pini, the Intransigents of London and Paris group, and other organizations. Notable illegalists include Ravachol, who launched the anarchist attacks of 1892-1894, and Marius Jacob with his Travailleurs de la Nuit ('Workers of the Night') group, who inspired Arsène Lupin and industrialized burglary. The Bonnot Gang, comprising members like Jules Bonnot and Rirette Maîtrejean, was a particularly influential illegalist organization in the emergence of modern banditry. Sociologically, illegalists were generally of peasant or working-class origin, and their organizations often included a significant number of women.

While some anarchists viewed illegalism as a legitimate movement, others, such as Saverio Merlino and Jean Grave, severely criticized illegalists. They saw these practices as selfish and useless, arguing that local and individual revolutions could not lead to a global one. They presented illegalism as a deviation from an orthodox anarchist dogma. These perspectives were shared by some 20th-century historiography of the anarchist movement, for example by Jean Maitron, before being re-examined and critiqued by more recent historians like Gaetano Manfredonia.

== General aspects ==
=== Ideological stances and practices ===
Illegalists emerged at roughly the same time as, and were generally similar or very closely linked to, European individualist anarchists of the same period. While not all individualist anarchists were illegalists, illegalists were generally individualist anarchists, though over time, non-anarchist criminals also joined the illegalist movement. As such, illegalists shared many tenets of European individualist anarchism. These included a critique of the focus on the working class, trade unions (including anarcho-syndicalism), and the belief that revolution should be sought and provoked immediately rather than waiting for a large revolutionary movement.

In this context, illegalists defined themselves primarily by their use of criminal methods, such as theft, to wage their revolutionary struggle. Individual reclamation, a practice they developed, involved stealing from bourgeois targets to use the stolen money for survival or to redistribute it to the people or anarchist organizations. Like other anarchists, illegalists were not opposed to rules but viewed state laws as an expression of class justice that largely favored the bourgeoisie—the very class that created these laws. Michel Antoine, a French illegalist, summarized this particular focus on refusing the law in some of his quotes:

One must live as broadly as possible, as freely, as intensely as possible and by all means [...] The anarchist does not have to take the law into account. He despises it in principle; he disapproves of it in its exercise and he fights it in its effects.

Illegalists were generally strong supporters of propaganda of the deed as a method of struggle. Furthermore, in addition to theft, burglaries, and squatting practices, illegalists sometimes adopted more ironic methods intended to shock the society they lived in. A number of them were thus convicted for 'offense against public morals'.

Summarizing their modes of action, one can say they engaged in theft (individual reclamation), counterfeiting, and also 'déménagements à la cloche de bois'—the practice of moving out without notifying the landlord. This last point, carried out by groups like the Pieds plats or the Ligue antipropriétaire ('Anti-Landlord League'), is considered an ancestor of the more recent practice of squatting by historian Cécile Péchu in her monograph on the subject.

To summarize illegalism, historian Jean-Marc Delpech speaks of a "class struggle envisioned in an individual relationship between the proletarianized dominated and the property-owning dominant".

=== Sociology of illegalists ===
Sociologically, illegalists were generally the children of peasants or laborers, representing the first generation to experience compulsory education in the French Republic. However, they often had to leave their studies early to work and support their families. Another characteristic feature of illegalist and individualist circles was the significant presence of women in comparison to the rest of civil society of the time.

== History ==
=== Context ===
In the 19th century, anarchism emerged and developed in Europe before spreading globally. Anarchists advocated for the struggle against all perceived forms of unjust domination, including economic domination with the rise of capitalism. They were particularly opposed to the state, viewed as the institution that legitimized these dominations through its police, military, and propaganda.

However, despite the apparent openness of the anarchist movement, it remained very closed to the social claims of certain classes, such as criminals. Being a criminal could even result in exclusion from the anarchist movement. For instance, after Pierre Martinet, an anarchist with a criminal record, attended the trial of one of his companions to defend him, he was excluded by the prosecutor who found it "unworthy" to allow him to speak as a witness. Anarchist groups echoed the prosecutor's accusation and forbade Martinet from speaking on behalf of the anarchist movement. This view was based on the idea that being a criminal was immoral and that a criminal anarchist lacked virtue compared to their non-criminal comrades.

A similar situation occurred when Clément Duval joined the movement. He had to conceal his prior criminal convictions for fear of being excluded from the groups he joined.

=== Duval, Pini, and birth of illegalism ===
During his trial, Duval was the first to theorize individual reclamation, which he, like Vittorio Pini shortly after, justified for four main reasons: it would directly resolve economic inequalities through force, terrorize the bourgeoisie, pedagogically convey anarchist ideas on property, and finally, prepare and incite the population to rise up to lead the Revolution. Duval was condemned to death, but his sentence was commuted to life imprisonment; he escaped on his eighteenth attempt in 1901.

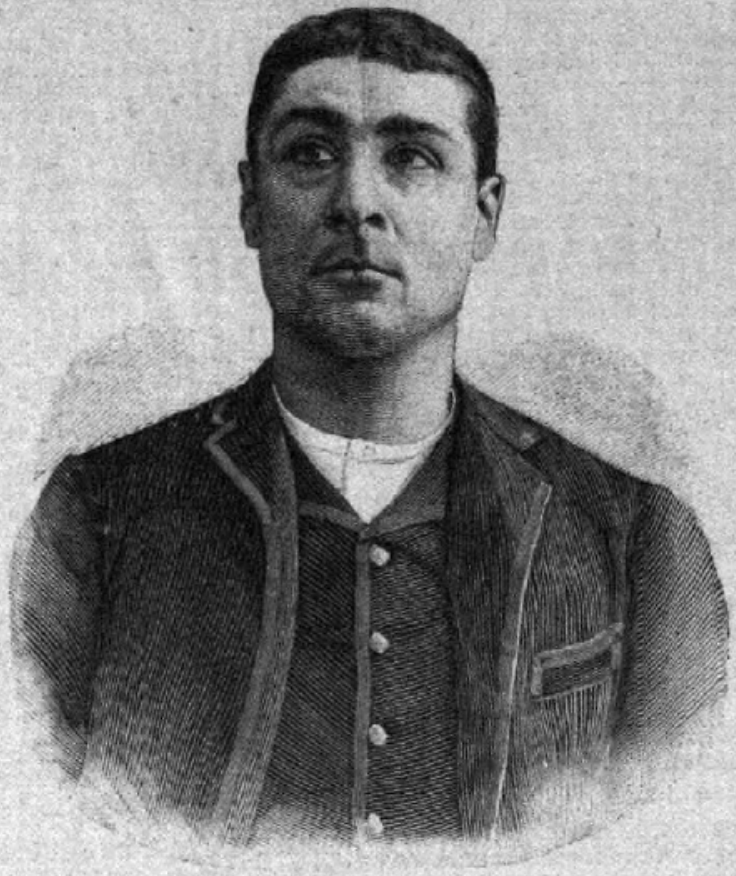
Depiction of Vittorio Pini in Le Petit Parisien : supplément illustré (15 May 1892)

Shortly after the Duval affair, the Italian illegalist militant Vittorio Pini, founder of the Intransigeants of London and Paris, one of the earliest illegalist groups, was arrested at his home following the discovery of significant burglary equipment. Placide Schouppe, one of his companions, was also arrested, and both were sent to a penal colony for life. Pini defended the same points as Duval during his trial, which generally leads him to be considered another founder of illegalism.

The trials of Duval and Pini marked a growing rift among anarchists in France. Older figures in the movement, such as Jean Grave, editor-in-chief of Le Révolté, categorically refused to consider illegalism legitimate. Grave's stance was then deemed authoritarian and erroneous by a significant number of grassroots militants, a fact noted by a police informant who wrote on the matter:

"There are many complaints about Grave and Méreau, the manager."

Louise Michel followed the case closely. This issue divided socialists like Jules Guesde and anarchists. While Guesde published writings criticizing Duval and his methods, Michel defended him, marking an even more complete commitment to anarchism. Séverine adopted a hesitant position toward Duval; while she regarded him with sympathy, she remained more distant than Michel.

=== First gangs and groups ===
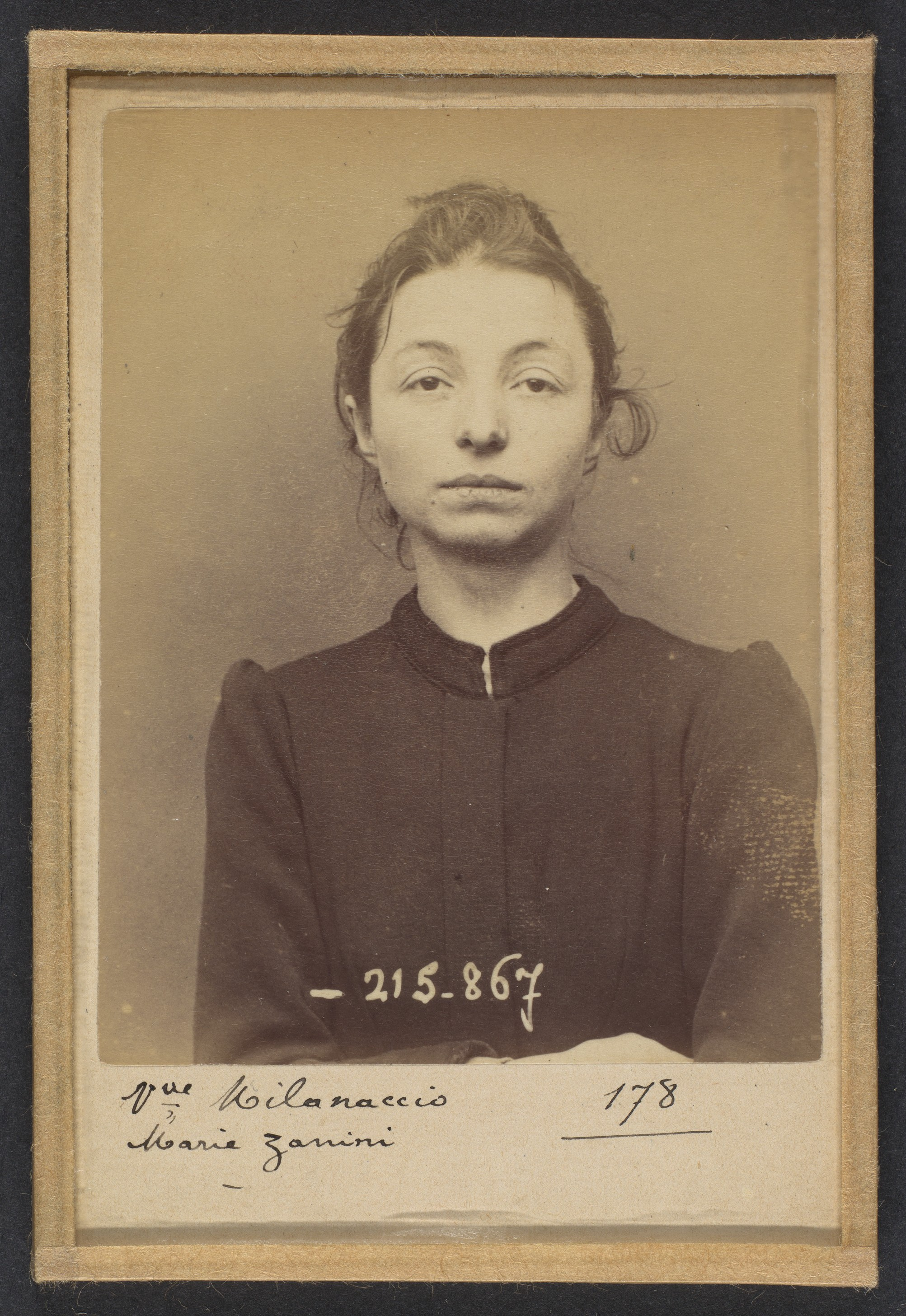
Maria Zanini, a member of the Ortiz Gang, after her arrest (1894)

Contrary to some hypotheses that viewed illegalists primarily as individual militants, numerous illegalist gangs emerged in France and other parts of Western Europe during the 1880s and 1890s. These illegalist militants organized across borders to sell stolen goods or evade the police.

One such group was the Ortiz Gang, named after Léon Ortiz, and including other militants like Antoinette Cazal or the Italians Maria Zanini, Orsini Bertani or Paolo Chiericotti and his wife, Annette Soubrier. Ortiz, influenced by his encounters with Pini and the Intransigeants of London and Paris, began organizing with Placide Schouppe during the Ère des attentats and other anarchists, forming this gang with them. Operating between Paris, Barcelona, London, Brussels, and Perpignan, Ortiz and his associates managed to evade the French police for some time. Between December 1892 and January 1893, he reconnected with Émile Henry, his friend and another illegalist and individualist—the two participated in burglaries together in northern France.

The Spannagel gang was another illegalist group of the early 1890s, formed around Émile Spannagel and linked with various people, including Louis Léveillé or Louis Galau and most of his seven children. Their group was also directly involved in the counterfeiting of money with the stolen jewelry that was melted down. Another one was the Rue des Abbesses gang, formed around the Adnet sisters, Clotilde and Jeanne, which was involved in counterfeiting operations.

A good number of the Ortiz Gang members were arrested in early 1894 during a police raid on their hideout. They were subsequently put on trial during the Trial of the Thirty, a political trial aimed at condemning the main anarchists in France, to which the authorities added the members of the Ortiz Gang. Contrary to expectations, the jurors acquitted all the accused, with the exception of Ortiz, who received the harshest sentence (15 years of deportation to penal servitude), and the members of his gang. According to Jean Grave, who was himself acquitted during this trial, the gang members had argued among themselves, trying to shift the blame for the burglaries onto former friends, some of whom even testified against them. Ortiz denied everything, declared that theft was a legitimate revolutionary weapon, and was convicted. This conviction was made possible by the fact that his actions were not considered anarchist by the French authorities, who, in the lois scélérates ('villainous laws'), a series of laws targeting the anarchist movement, established a distinction between 'ideologists' and 'propagandists,' with the latter being much more severely punished—like Ortiz.

=== Marius Jacob and the 'industrialization' of individual reclamation ===
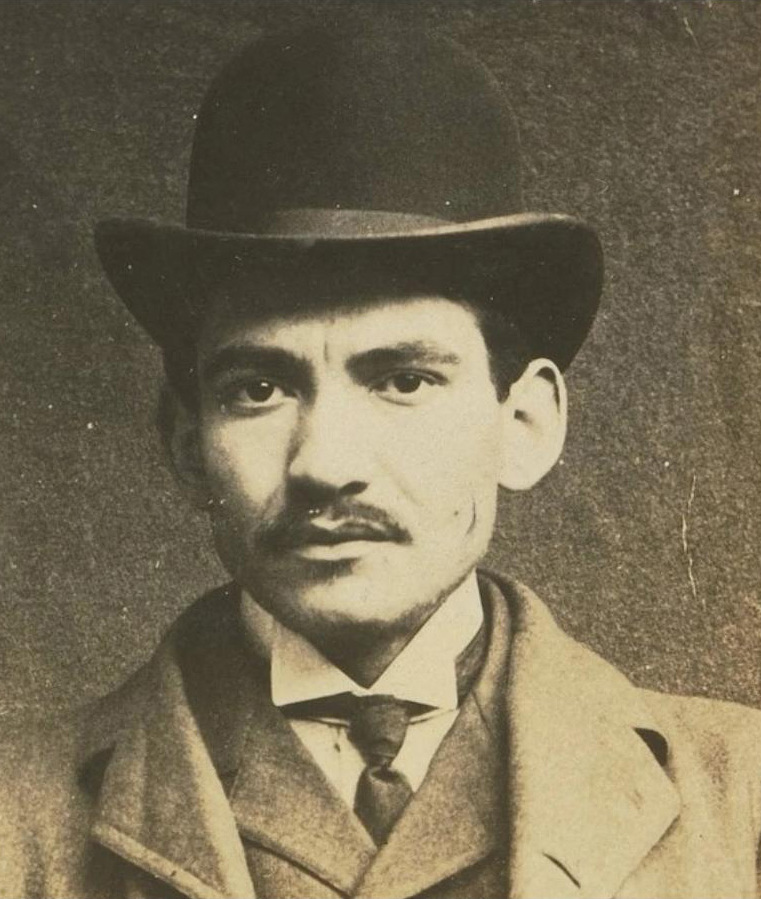
Marius Jacob after his arrest (1903)

From the latter half of the 1890s, illegalist practices spread and became more refined. Individual reclamation notably took on a new scope through the actions of Marius Jacob, a very well-known illegalist of the period. In 1899, he committed a spectacular robbery where, disguised as a police officer with three companions, he arrested a police commissionaire for corruption and relieved the police of their belongings, without them realizing it until it was too late. With his group, the Travailleurs de la Nuit ('Workers of the Night'), founded in 1900, Jacob, who later inspired the character of Arsène Lupin, embarked on a significant, almost industrial, series of burglaries and thefts. Delpech even dares to speak of the "Taylorization" of robbery and burglary, as this group engaged in dozens of burglaries within a very short timeframe.

The organization of the group and its logistics were meticulously planned. Based in Paris, the Workers of the Night group subdivided into brigades, usually of three people. One person would leave Paris to act as a scout, travel to a target city, and mark the doors of a significant number of bourgeois houses to be robbed. During a second pass, the scout would check their marks, noting where doors had been opened (indicating the house was inhabited) and where the mark remained (indicating the house was uninhabited). The scout would then assess the empty house, its entry points, and the feasibility of burgling it, return to the city center, and send a coded telegram to their two companions, inviting them to join. Once they arrived, the group would force entry into the building and plunder it, generally leaving one of the three as a lookout to warn them of any danger. In some cases, group members didn't use a lookout but instead placed a toad—if they heard its croaking stop, it meant someone was approaching, and the toad served as the lookout.

Between 1900 and 1903, it is estimated that Jacob engaged in at least 156 burglaries—more than one per week—70 of which were brought up in his trial and that of the Workers of the Night. These figures are likely underestimated by French justice, given that a number of burglaries from that era were probably overlooked in police records. Despite his extensive thefts, Jacob didn't significantly profit from the proceeds. According to his own testimony to historian Jean Maitron in 1948, 10% of the stolen goods were systematically donated to anarchist propaganda efforts. Furthermore, he lived with his mother and partner in a relatively modest dwelling and did not flaunt the wealth seized by the group.

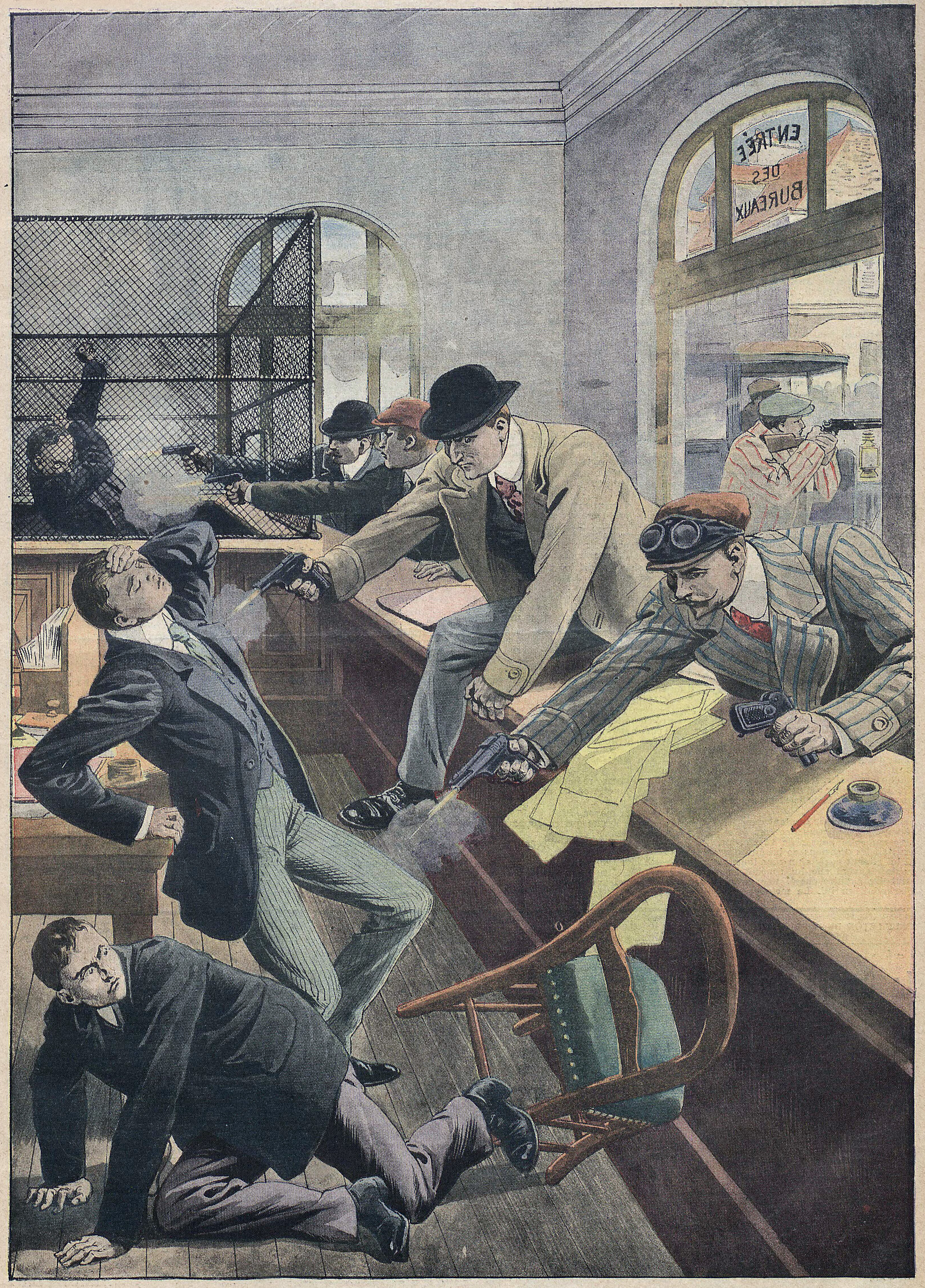
Attack of the Société Générale Chantilly headquarters by the Bonnot Gang (1912)

After his arrest, Jacob was tried and sentenced to life in a penal colony. He remained there for over twenty years before being released in 1927 and returning to France.

=== Bonnot Gang ===
In the early 1910s, an illegalist group formed around a core of illegalists and was quickly dubbed the Bonnot Gang, named after one of its members, Jules Bonnot. This group was influential in establishing modern banditry and organized crime, pioneering the first motorized robberies and using repeating rifles.

In correspondence between Grave and Duval, Grave criticized Duval for founding illegalism, specifically pointing to the Bonnot Gang. After a series of major robberies, such as the Ordener attack or the attack on the Société Générale agency in Chantilly on 25 March 1912, most of the group's members were killed or arrested. A notable member of the gang was Rirette Maîtrejean.

== Limitations, criticisms, and rehabilitation ==
=== Practical limitations and the question of anarchist propaganda ===
Despite their radicalism, illegalists didn't manage to change the social situation, which remained a society of property owners. They themselves gained little wealth, as their thefts were rarely large-scale burglaries but more often small-scale actions. Some of the most notable illegalists, like Louis Maîtrejean, only earned thirty francs per week from their criminal activity, whereas he previously earned ten francs per day as a saddler. Furthermore, most of them were killed by the police, arrested and imprisoned, or deported to penal colonies, which Marius Jacob himself noted when he wrote:

If through [illegalism], [the individual] succeeds in freeing himself from a few servitudes, the inequality of the struggle gives rise to others even heavier, ultimately leading to the loss of freedom, the meager freedom he enjoyed, and sometimes even life.

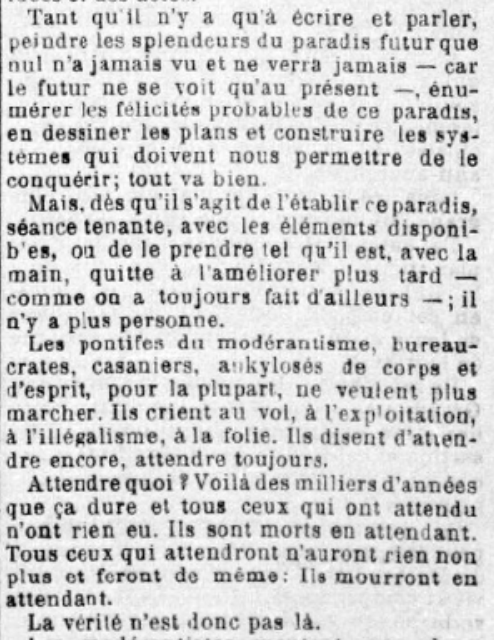
Parts of Byzantinism and Limpness article by Michel Antoine in L'Anarchie, criticizing the opponents to illegalism (7 January 1909)

According to historian Vivien Bouhey, on the contrary, illegalists at least managed to gain a relatively significant profit that was redistributed for anarchist propaganda. He notes that many anarchist organizations at the time received funds for publishing or organizing from unknown sources, possibly linked to thefts or burglaries. This observation is shared by Delpech, who analyzed the funding of Jacob and the Workers of the Night and highlighted the fact that he financed a good part of French anarchist publications and organizations of the period. Interestingly, while he more or less officially financed individualist publications and organizations, it is probable that he also supported anarchist publications highly critical of illegalism—such as Les Temps Nouveaux by Jean Grave—who was himself a major critic of illegalism.

=== Anarchist internal conflicts and their place in the anarchist movement historiography ===
From the Duval affair onwards, illegalism sparked intense controversy within the anarchist movement. While some anarchists agreed with illegalism, others were skeptical or opposed. For example, Saverio Merlino viewed these practices as useless or selfish, questioning the self-serving reuse of stolen goods by some illegalists and also challenging the social aspect of the practice; he argued that a series of individual and isolated actions could not lead to societal change that needed to occur at the systemic level. In France, Jean Grave, editor-in-chief of La Révolte and later Les Temps Nouveaux, was particularly opposed to these practices. He compared illegalists to bourgeois, criticized their anarchist motivations, and portrayed them very negatively in his memoirs, as police informers and hedonists pretending to be anarchists.

=== Negative historiography and rehabilitation ===
These negative perspectives were partially adopted in the historiography of the anarchist movement by Jean Maitron and Daniel Guérin, among others. When these two 20th-century historians revisited illegalism and individualist anarchism, focusing on aspects related to both propaganda of the deed and individual reclamation, they echoed the view that these were deviations from the anarchist movement. For them, propaganda of the deed and illegalism, seen as temporary and deviant 'episodes', were 'sterile'. At the end of the 20th century, Jean-Marc Delpech, Gaetano Manfredonia, and Walter Badier initiated a re-evaluation of these perspectives. Delpech addressed these questions, writing:

'Dominant historiography generally considers the bombings of 1892-1894 and illegalist banditry as a mere parenthesis in the history of the [anarchist] movement. These actions are often perceived as youthful errors that paved the way for anarcho-syndicalism. [...] It is interesting to note the use of medical and psychological vocabulary to describe these episodes. These terms darken these two periods of the [anarchist] movement, presenting them almost as diseases. For example, Daniel Guérin speaks of an 'episodic and sterilizing deviation' and a 'contamination by a chimeric and adventurous virus'. Jean Maitron, for his part, reiterates the idea of acts whose 'sterility was evident' and, paraphrasing Lenin, calls them the 'infantile disorder of anarchism'. For Henri Arvon, it is an 'attack of madness' that struck Europe and the world. For Gaetano Manfredonia, while Maitron's analyses "remain valid, they would benefit from being placed within a broader framework: that of the ideological debates that permeated the European [anarchist] movement around the 1890s". Without this, the historian is limited to evoking the 'dark period of bombings,' as Claude Faber does, or narrating in detail the bloody adventure of the 'tragic bandits'. In other words, this amounts to classifying individualists, from Ravachol to Bonnot, not only among the enemies of order but, above all, among the marginal, the exalted, the 'abnormal', the outsiders. This classification deprives them of any ideological and political consideration.'

== Primary sources ==
=== Articles in L'Anarchie ===
- Byzantinisme et Avachissement by Michel Antoine, 7 January 1909, defending illegalism and criticizing the opponents to it

== Bibliography ==
- Bach Jensen, Richard (2015). The Battle against Anarchist Terrorism: An International History, 1878–1934. Cambridge: Cambridge University Press (CUP). ISBN 978-1-107-03405-1.
- Badier, Walter (2010), "Émile Henry, le « Saint-Just de l'Anarchie »" [Émile Henry, the 'Saint-Just of Anarchy'], Parlement[s] (in French), vol. 14, no. 2, Paris: Revue d'histoire politique, pp. 159–171, doi:10.3917/parl.014.0159
- Baylac, Marie-Hélène (2024), Louise Michel, Paris: Perrin, ISBN 978-2262097714
- Bonanno, Alfredo M. (2013), "Le problème du vol : Clément Duval" [The problem of theft: Clément Duval] (PDF), Salto, subversion & anarchie (in French), vol. 3
- Bouhey, Vivien (2008), Les Anarchistes contre la République [The Anarchists against the Republic] (in French), Rennes: Presses universitaires de Rennes (PUR), ISBN 9782753507272
- Delpech, Jean-Marc (2006), Parcours et réseaux d'un anarchiste : Alexandre Marius Jacob : 1879-1954 (PhD thesis) [The life and networks of an anarchist: Alexandre Marius Jacob: 1879-1954] (PDF), Nancy: Université de Nancy 2, archived (PDF) from the original on 5 April 2025
- Dipaola, Paolo (2004), Italian anarchists in London (1870-1914) (PhD thesis), London: University of London (GC), p. 278
- Frayne, Carl Tobias (2022), Individualist Anarchism in France and Its Legacy (PhD thesis), Cambridge: University of Cambridge, doi:10.17863/CAM.80240
- Galleani, Luigi, ed. (1929), "Clemente Duval (Cenno biografico)", Memorie autobiografiche (in Italian), Newark: Biblioteca de L'Adunata dei refrattari, pp. 15–69, OCLC 2314088
- Houte, Arnaud-Dominique (2021). Propriété défendue : La société française à l'épreuve du vol (XIXe - XXe siècles) [Property defended: French society and the challenge of theft (19th–20th centuries)] (in French). Gallimard. ISBN 9782072880667.
- Jourdain, Edouard (2013). L'anarchisme [Anarchism] (in French). Paris: La Découverte. ISBN 978-2-7071-9091-8.
- Maitron, Jean (1955), Histoire du mouvement anarchiste en France (1800-1914) (in French), Paris: Histoire du mouvement anarchiste en France, 1880-1914
- Merriman, John M. (2016). The dynamite club: how a bombing in fin-de-siècle Paris ignited the age of modern terror. Yale University Press. ISBN 978-0-300-21792-6.
- Péchu, Cécile (2010), Les squats [Squats], Contester, Paris: Presses de Sciences Po (PSP), doi:10.3917/scpo.pechu.2010.01, ISBN 978-2-7246-1169-4
- Steiner, Anne (2013), Les En-Dehors : Anarchistes individualistes et illégalistes à la « Belle Époque » [The Outsiders: Individualist Anarchists and Illegalists in the "Belle Époque"] (in French), Paris: L'Échappée, ISBN 9782373090574
- Verhaeghe, Sidonie (2019), "Une pensée politique de la Commune : Louise Michel à travers ses Conférences" [A political thought of the Commune : Louise Michel through her Conferences], Actuel Marx (in French), 66 (2): 81–98, doi:10.3917/amx.066.0081
- Ward, Colin (2004). Anarchism: A Very Short Introduction. Oxford University Press (OUP).
