= Ordener attack =

1911 Bonnot Gang bank attack in Paris, France

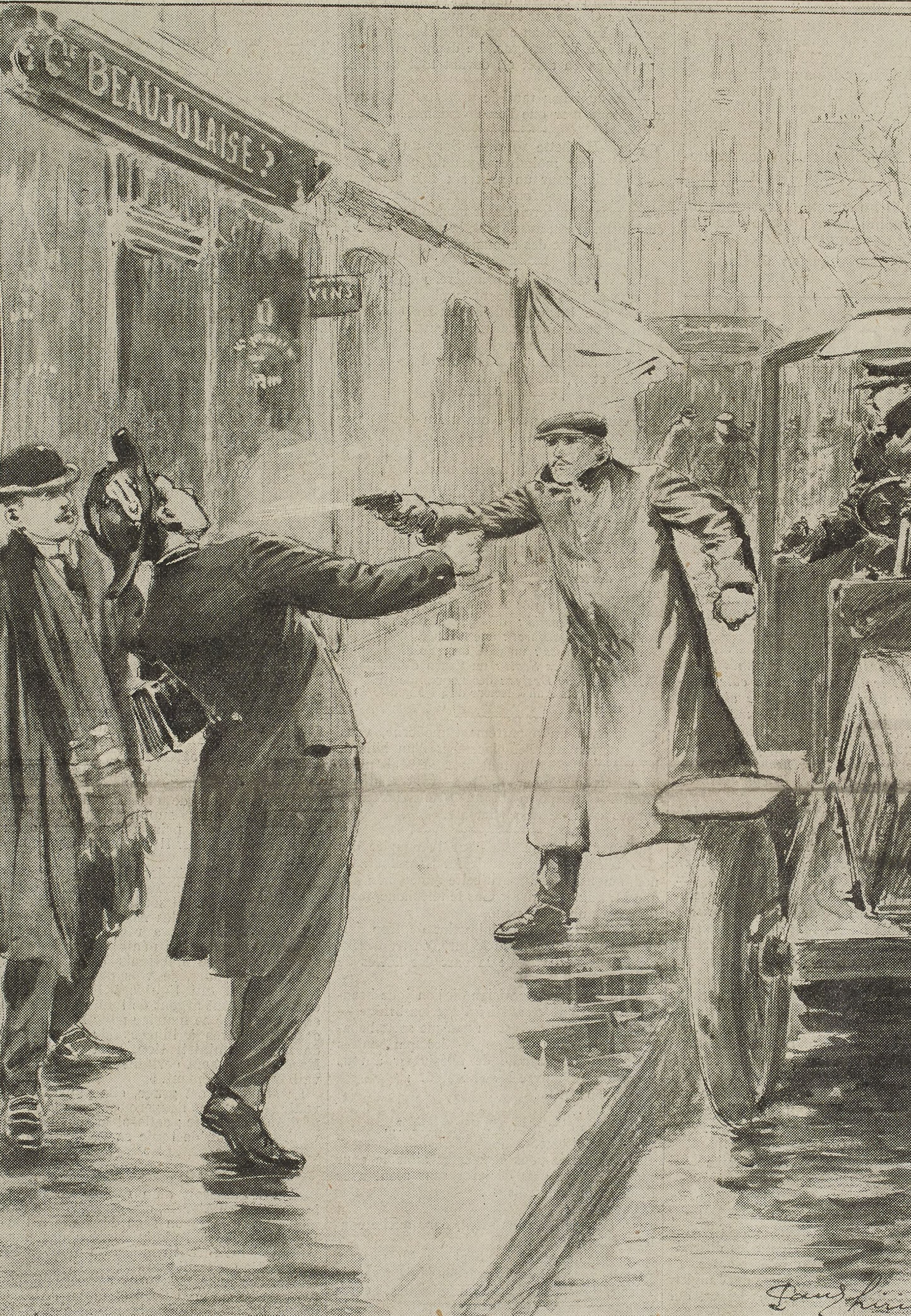
- Representation of the attack in L'Excelsior on 22 December 1911
- Location: 48°53′37″N 2°20′12″E
- Date: 21 December 1911
- Deaths: 0
- Injuries: At least 1
- Perpetrators: Jules Bonnot; Raymond Callemin; Octave Garnier
- Motive: Anarchism; Illegalism; Need for money

The Ordener attack was an armed robbery carried out on 21 December 1911, in Paris by the illegalist anarchists of the Bonnot Gang. This was the Bonnot Gang's first heist, notable as the first motorized robbery in history and a significant event in the emergence of modern banditry.

Jules Bonnot, at the time a fugitive for the accidental or intentional murder (a point of debate) of an anarchist companion and wanted by the authorities, made contact with a number of Parisian illegalists, with whom he began preparing an operation. Their planned jewelry store burglary fell through, and in critical need of money, the members decided to target the courier responsible for delivering daily funds to the Société Générale bank on Rue Ordener. In a car, Raymond Callemin and Octave Garnier got out, shot their target (who survived), and made off with the money. Their car allowed them to outpace the police, who were caught off guard by the use of motorized transport.

Despite the success of their operation, the sum recovered was negligible and did not meet their expectations. Furthermore, the members of the operation faced the death penalty, and thus had nothing left to lose, which drove them to continue their actions in the following months with increasing violence. Most of the members were subsequently killed, arrested, or executed.

== Background ==
In the 19th century, anarchism emerged and took shape in Europe before spreading. Anarchists advocated a struggle against all forms of domination perceived as unjust including economic domination brought forth by capitalism. They were particularly opposed to the State, seen as the organization that legitimized these dominations through its police, army and propaganda.

Within the anarchist movement during the latter decades of the 19th century, some militants like Clément Duval and Vittorio Pini developed the tendency of illegalism. This supported illegal anarchist struggle and, more specifically, defended practices like individual reclamation—the idea that since the bourgeoisie would steal from the people, it would be legitimate to steal from the bourgeoisie in return. This approach aimed to resolve inequalities directly, without waiting for a hypothetical revolution.

In the early 20th century, a number of illegalists gathered around the newspaper L'Anarchie. Some of them, such as Raymond Callemin, Édouard Carouy, and Octave Garnier, along with the Romainville Gang, came into contact with Jules Bonnot (1876–1912). Bonnot's youth was marked by violence, rebellions against the police, fines, and arrests. Encountering anarchists and illegalists in Lyon, he gradually joined these groups. From 1907 onwards, he fully embraced banditry, living off thefts and frequently changing his identity. In November 1911, while involved in bicycle and automobile theft, he left Lyon to escape the police with Joseph Platano, an illegalist from L'Anarchie. During their flight, Bonnot killed his companion. According to the police version, it was a settling of scores over the division of loot from a robbery, and Bonnot assassinated his companion. However, Bonnot claimed instead that Platano seriously injured himself while handling his weapon, and he chose to finish him off to spare him an agonizing death.

== Premices ==
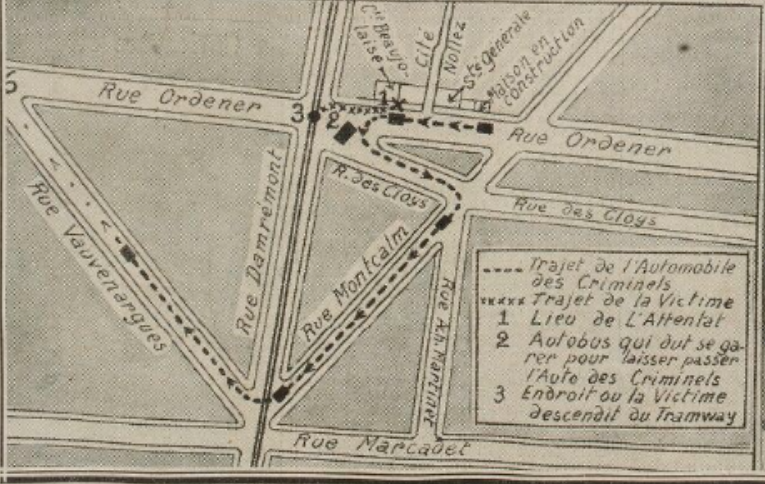
Depiction of the Ordener attack route in l'Excelsior (22 December 1911) Legend : - is the attackers route / xxx is the victim route / 1 is the place of the shooting / 2 is where an autobus had to let the car pass / 3 where the victim left the tramway

Bonnot then joined Parisian anarchist circles, where he was welcomed and introduced by Genevan companions to Garnier's group. At that time, Garnier and Callemin were already contemplating a burglary using a stolen car. This would allow them to outrun the police and transport the blowtorches needed to break open safes. Despite this desire, none of them knew how to drive, as a car then cost as much as fifteen years of a Parisian worker's salary. Bonnot's introduction to their circles connected them with a driver capable of executing this plan.

For his part, it is possible that Bonnot was initially hesitant to get involved with this group, which was more "amateur" in banditry than he was. However, his face was plastered across the front pages of several French newspapers; he was actively sought, his mistress, Judith Thollon, had been arrested in Lyon, and he desperately needed money to evade the police. He then agreed to join them.

On the night of 13 to 14 December 1911, members of the newly formed Bonnot Gang—aided by Bonnot's expertise in car theft—managed to steal a black Delaunay Belleville. Carouy concealed it in the hangar of one of his anarchist companions, Jean Detweiller.

== Attack ==
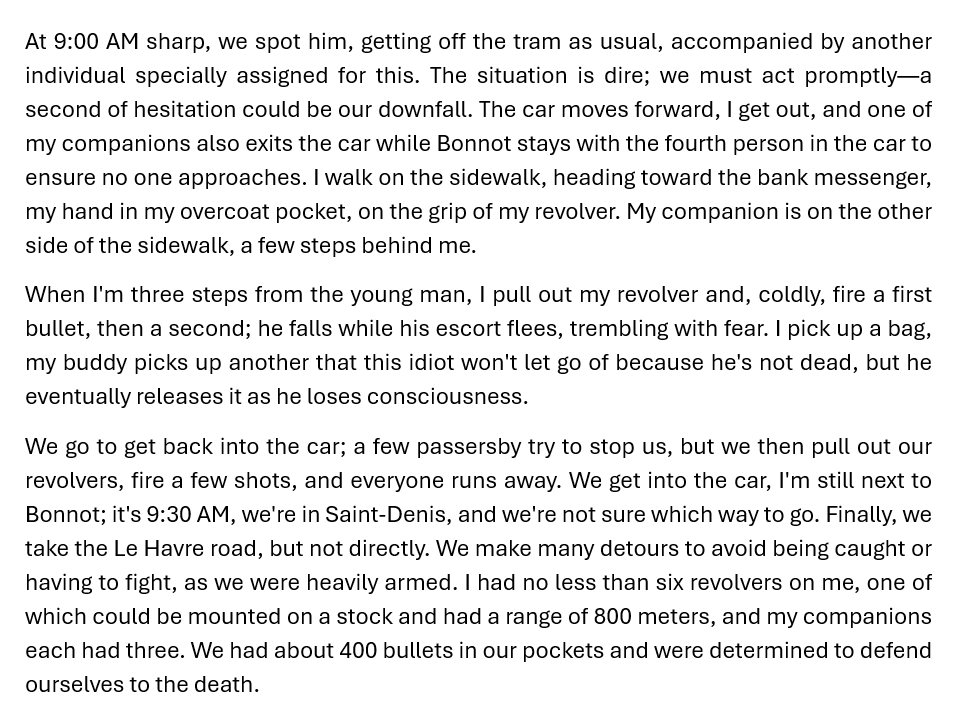
Account on the Ordener attack by Raymond Callemin in his Memoirs (1912-1913 ?)

On the night of 20–21 December 1911, the Bonnot Gang initially aimed to burgle a jewelry store, planning to use the stolen car to transport blowtorches capable of melting safes. However, the conditions for such an undertaking weren't met, and the group had to abandon this plan. According to Raymond Callemin, the lack of rain dissuaded them, as rain would have helped conceal their burglary, making it less risky.

Around 3:00 AM, the group decided to change their plans. Through the Corsican anarchist militant Pierre Cardi, the members knew that the Société Générale bank at 158 Rue Ordener received cash deliveries every morning at 8:45 AM from its headquarters. While waiting, the group drove around Paris, and Bonnot taught Garnier to drive on the Champs-Élysées so Garnier could take over if needed. Bonnot then took the wheel again, and the car proceeded to Rue Ordener, stopping at number 148. From there, the members could monitor the tram stop and await the arrival of the courier. A crowd began to gather around the car, a rare sight in the working-class neighborhood, just as they spotted their target—dressed in the company uniform—arriving with another courier, who was supposed to act as his bodyguard.

Garnier and Callemin then exited the car and approached the courier. The accounts of the ensuing events vary among historians. Anne Steiner maintains that Octave Garnier shot their target without warning, while Marc Renneville suggests that both men attempted to snatch his satchel unsuccessfully before shooting him and escaping with the satchel. Callemin, in his Memoirs, claims he was the one who shot their target without warning.

Regardless, the courier, identified as Ernest Caby, was seriously wounded and collapsed. His satchel was seized, the other courier fled, and the gang members returned to the car. Bonnot quickly restarted the engine and sped out of Paris.

== Suites ==
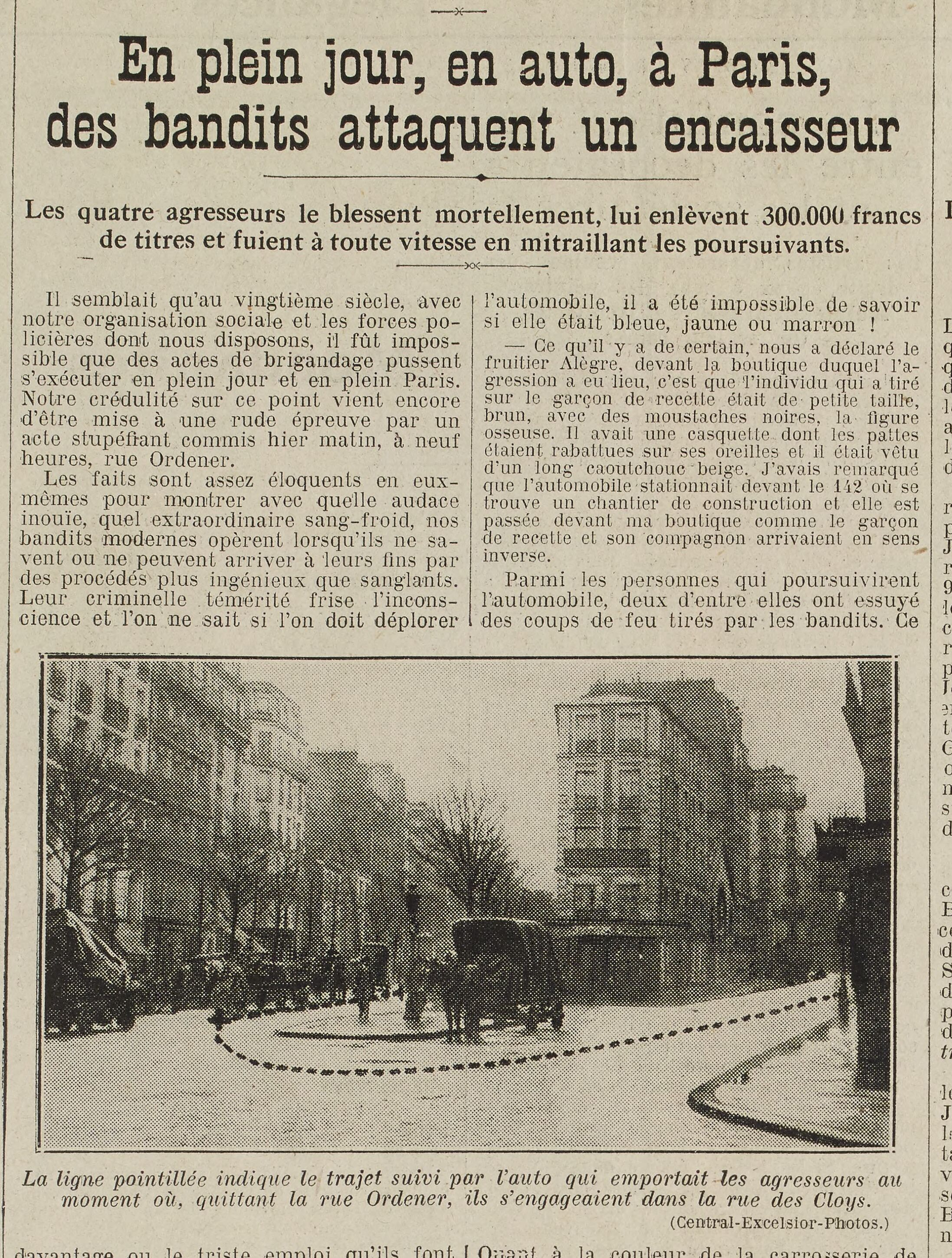
Article on the Ordener attack in l'Excelsior (22 December 1911), showing the escape route on the ground of the picture

In Pontoise, the group stopped and evaluated their loot. They had hoped for a large sum, but it amounted to only 5,000 francs in cash and 320,000 francs in securities that were very difficult to sell. Bonnot and Garnier took turns driving and headed towards Le Havre but got lost along the way and arrived instead in Dieppe. There, they learned from the press that Caby had survived, and also that the press had a relatively precise description of Garnier—meaning it was only a matter of time before the police would be able to recognize him through their informants within anarchist circles.

Knowing they were condemned to the guillotine the moment they were captured, the members then embarked on a "headlong rush". Having nothing left to lose, their objective was now simply to continue their actions and evade the police for as long as possible.

The Bonnot Gang continued their robberies and attacks in the following months, such as during the attack on the Société Générale in Chantilly, where the members replicated a motorized robbery. Most of the members were subsequently killed, executed, or imprisoned.

== Legacy ==
The Ordener attack holds a significant place in history as the first motorized robbery ever committed. This event marked an evolution of modern banditry and had a lasting impact on the broader history of criminal activity.

== Bibliography ==
- Bouhey, Vivien (2008), Les Anarchistes contre la République [The Anarchists against the Republic] (in French), Rennes: Presses universitaires de Rennes (PUR)
- Jourdain, Edouard (2013). L'anarchisme [Anarchism]. Paris: La Découverte. ISBN 978-2-7071-9091-8.
- Maréchaux, Laurent (2009), Hors la loi : Anarchistes, illégalistes, as de la gâchette... ils ont choisi la liberté [Outlaws: Anarchists, illegalists, gunslingers... They chose freedom] (in French), Arthaud, ISBN 978-2-7003-0152-6
- Steiner, Anne (2013), Les En-Dehors : Anarchistes individualistes et illégalistes à la « Belle Époque » [The Outsiders: Individualist Anarchists and Illegalists in the "Belle Époque"] (in French), Paris: L'Échappée, ISBN 9782373090574
- Ward, Colin (2004). Anarchism: A Very Short Introduction. Oxford University Press (OUP).
