= Anna Dondon =

French illegalist anarchist (1884–1979)

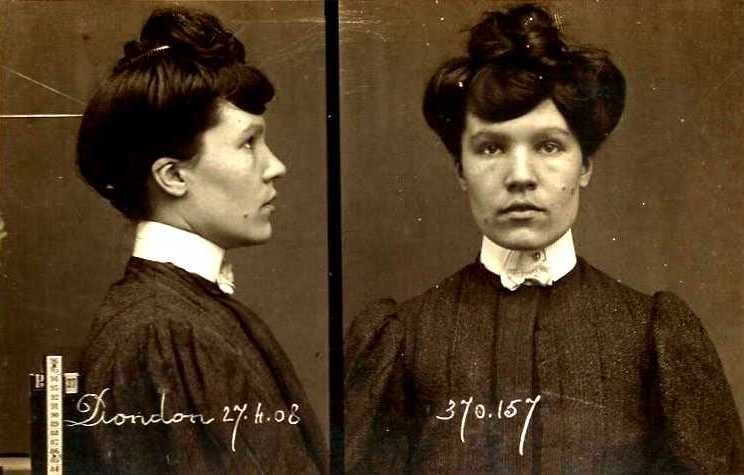
- Dondon after her arrest (1908)
- Born: 27 August 1884; Decize, France
- Died: 3 June 1979 (aged 94); Bondy, France
- Organisation: Bonnot Gang
- Movement: Anarchism in France

Anna Dondon (1884–1979) was a French illegalist anarchist, associated with the Bonnot Gang.

== Biography ==
Anna Dondon was born on 27 August 1884, in the town of Decize, in the eastern department of Nièvre. She was raised by her father in Clermont-Ferrand, where she received an education, before going on to work as a dressmaker. In 1905, she moved to Paris, where she attended the founding of the newspaper L'Anarchie. In 1907, she was arrested for circulating counterfeit money and sentenced to 5 years in Rennes prison. While she was in prison, her parents looked after her daughter. On 7 October 1909, she was released on parole.

She then returned to Paris, where she reunited with the L'Anarchie group. There she met the illegalist René Valet, with whom she began a relationship. In 1911, they moved to Romainville. There they lived on a commune, together with other anarchists of what became the Bonnot Gang. Inhabitants of the commune practised naturism, vegetarianism and physical fitness, supporting their lifestyle through theft. In order to avoid being traced by police while they engaged in illegal activities, Dondon and the other women were only referred to by their surnames. After the arrest of Edouard Carouy, in September 1911, the commune broke up and the inhabitants went their separate ways. Together with Raymond Callemin, Dondon and Valet managed to find friends to stay with in Paris.

On 8 January 1912, Dondon and Valet moved into a building on Rue Ordener. From this flat, they provided their anarchist comrades with safe houses and cased banks for future robberies. They provided Étienne Monier with a place to hide while he was avoiding the police. In March 1912, other members of the Bonnot Gang moved into their flat, from which they planned and carried out a series of robberies and attacks. After Valet carried out a bank robbery of a branch of the Société Générale, he left his home on rue Ordener. Dondon and Valet told their concierge that they would be going on holiday to the country but never returned. Instead, they had found a safe house, together with Marie Vuillemin and her partner Octave Garnier.

In May 1912, police discovered that Dondon had been seen at a villa in Nogent-sur-Marne. They managed to confirm that she and Vuillemin had been at the villa, but could not confirm the presence of Valet or Garnier. A police report described Dondon as "a little dumpling, very brown and somewhat creole, artistic-looking, with her hair in ringlets and wearing a bandana." By the time the police raided the villa, Dondon was no longer there. She had since left the villa and gone to Garches. Meanwhile, Valet and Garnier had been killed during the police raid. Due to poor health, Dondon was forced to stay in Paris, where she was arrested on 14 May and taken in for questioning by the Sûreté. However, while other gang members went on trial, Dondon was never charged with any crime.

Following World War I, Dondon joined the group around the publication Le Libertaire, attending lectures by Sébastien Faure and joining the group's Sunday excursions. She remained active within the French anarchist movement for the rest of her life. Dondon died in Bondy, in the department of Seine-Saint-Denis, on 3 June 1979.

== Bibliography ==
- Merriman, John (2017). Ballad of the Anarchist Bandits: The Crime Spree that Gripped Belle Époque Paris. Nation Books. ISBN 978-1-56858-988-6.
- Parry, Richard (1987). The Bonnot Gang. London: Rebel Press. ISBN 0-946061-04-1.
- Steiner, Anne (22 July 2021) [27 March 2014]. "DONDON Anna, Thérèse". Dictionnaire des anarchistes (in French). Éditions de l'Atelier.
