= Eugène Dieudonné =

French anarchist (1884–1944)

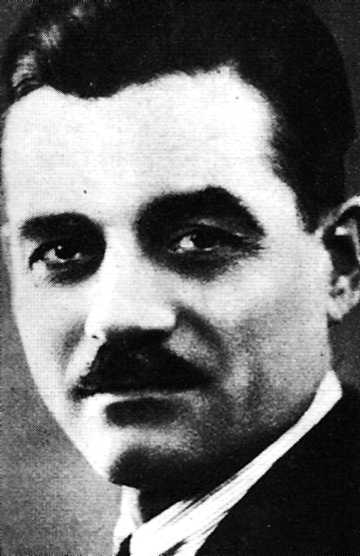
- Dieudonné in 1912
- Born: 1 May 1884; Nancy, France
- Died: 21 August 1944 (aged 60); Seine-et-Oise, France
- Movement: French anarchism

Eugène Dieudonné (1884–1944) was a French anarchist and illegalist. He was a frequent visitor of the headquarters of L'Anarchie and accused of being a member of the Bonnot Gang. Despite Jules Bonnot and Octave Garnier exonerating him, he was accused and convicted of participating in the robbery of a Société Générale branch in Paris in 1912. Initially sentenced to death, his sentence was commuted to forced labor for life and he was sent to French Guiana, whence he was able to flee to Brazil in 1926. Journalists Albert Londres and Louis Roubaud secured his pardon and he returned to France where he spent the rest of his life as a furniture manufacturer.

== Life ==
Eugène Dieudonné was born 1 May 1884 in Nancy, to a widow with three other young children, and was raised in the Stanislas orphanage. From the age of 16 he worked as a joiner. He was active in the local anarchist scene.

In 1907, he married Louise Kaiser, and in 1909 the couple moved to Paris with their son, Pierre. There, he was a frequent visitor of the headquarters of L'Anarchie.

He was arrested on 27 February 1912, accused of being involved in the Bonnot Gang's robbery of the Société Générale. Dieudonné denied the accusation, and a letter by Octave Garnier, an anarchist member of the Bonnot Gang, written while Garnier was on the run, exonerated him, but on 3 February 1913 the jury nonetheless found Dieudonné guilty, and he was sentenced to death. Raymond Callemin, convicted of the same crime, declared that he and Garnier were the only people culpable, which led to the President commuting Dieudonné's sentence to forced labour in perpetuity.

First deported to the penal colony in Guiana, then to Cayenne, Dieudonné attempted escape several times, and was finally successful in December 1926. A few months later, he was arrested and detained in Belem do Para in Brazil. Back in France, there were campaigns for his release initiated by his wife, his lawyer, and journalists Albert Londres and Louis Roubaud. He was released from his sentence on 29 August 1927, and returned to France, where he worked in Faubourg Saint-Antoine.

Owing to his experience in prison, Dieudonné no longer advocated for illegalism. Anarchists from Libertaire, in particular Louis Loréal, accused him of abandoning the anarchist cause.

Dieudonné appeared (as himself) in a theatrical performance by Albert Londres. He was friends with Jean Vigo, and did carpentry work for his films. Vigo intended to create a film, Evadé du bagne, about Dieudonné's prison experiences; Gaby Morlay would have starred alongside Dieudonné. Vigo died before the film was made.

Dieudonné died in the hospital in Eaubonne on 21 August 1944.

== Works ==
In 1930, Dieudonné published La Vie des Forçats ("The life of those condemned to forced labour") with éditions Gallimard. A new edition, illustrated by Thierry Guitard, was published in 2014.

He also narrated a 1931 documentary film on the experience of life in a penal colony, Autour d'une évasion.

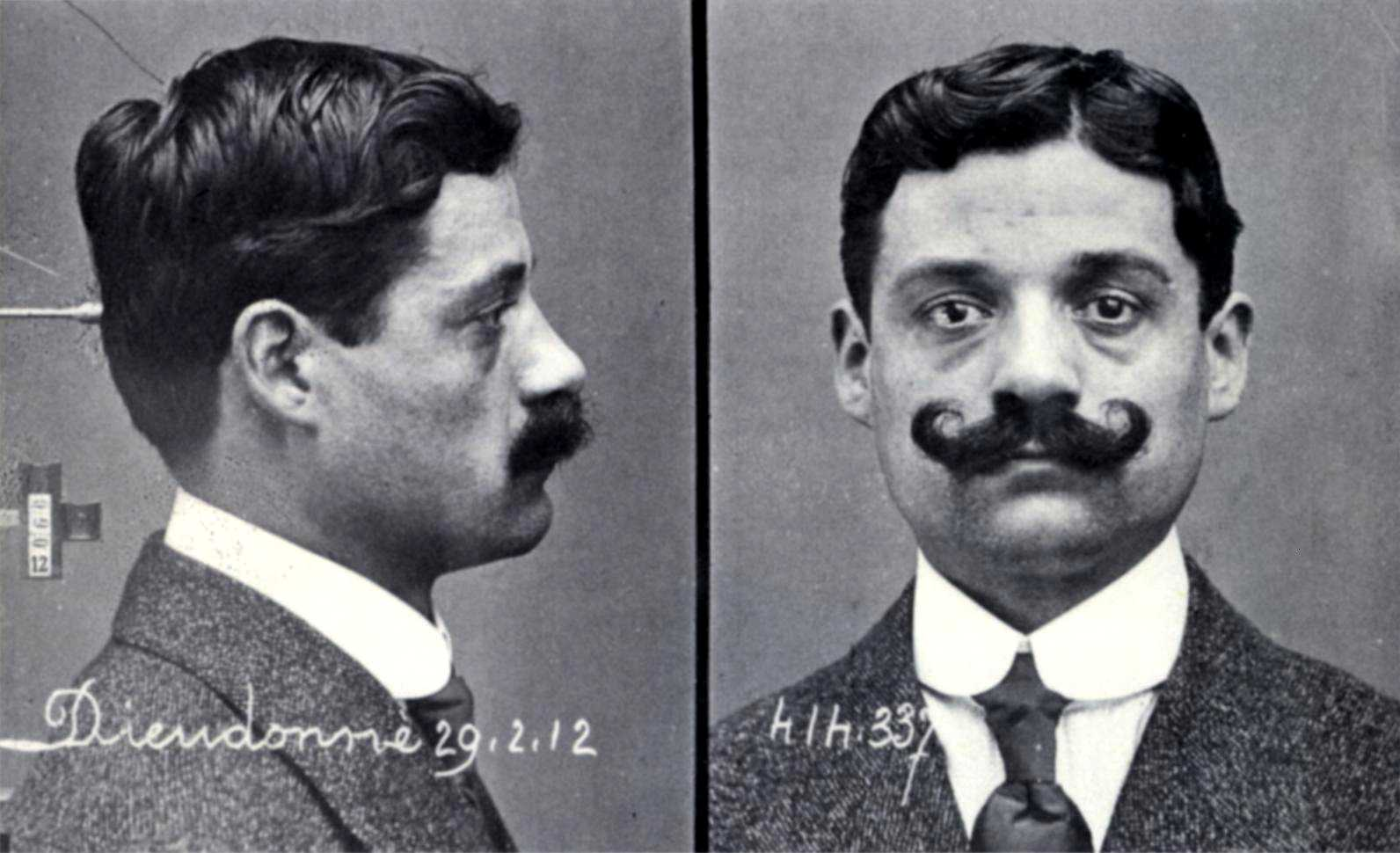
Dieudonné's mugshot 1912

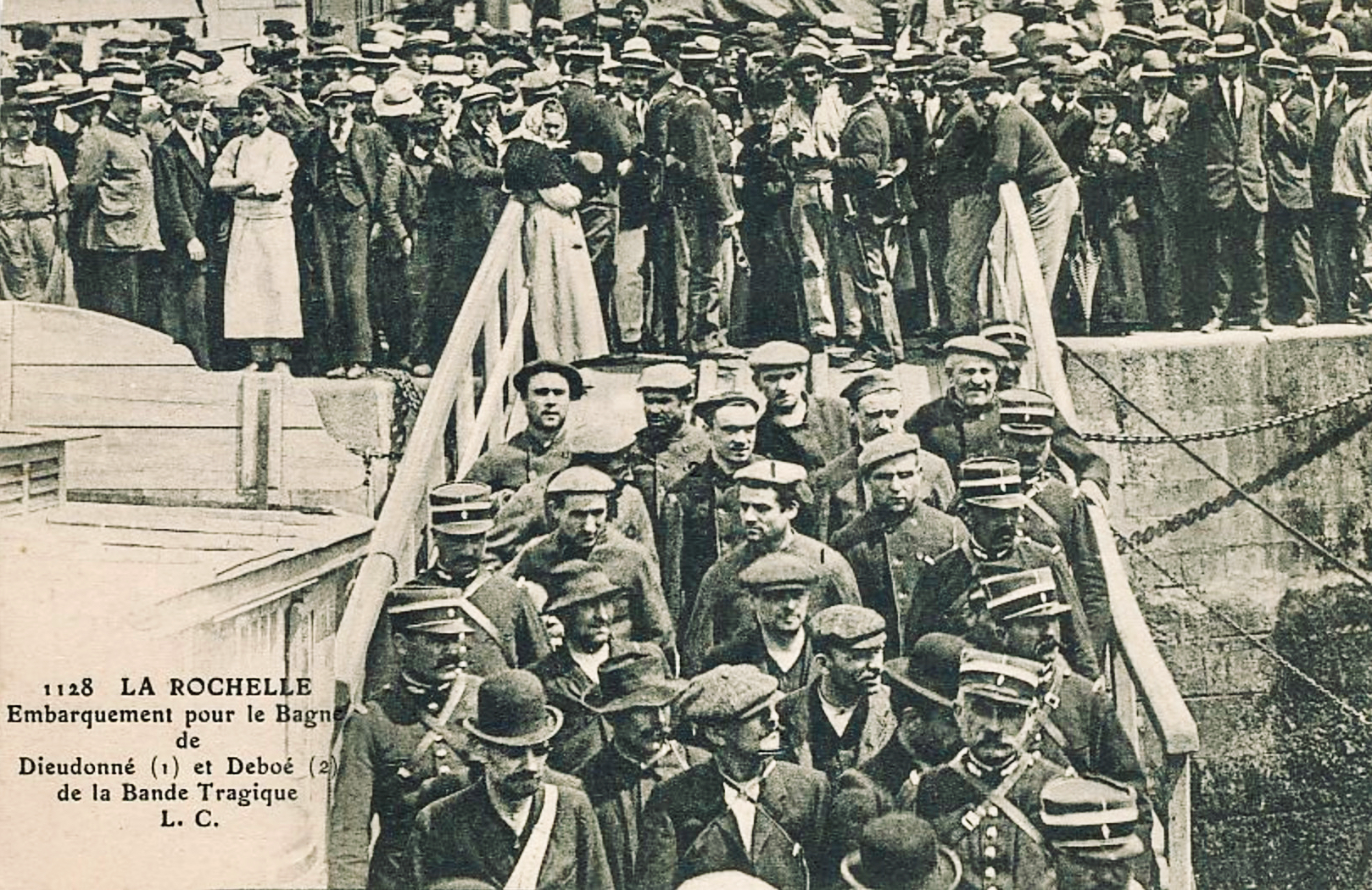
Deportation of Eugène Dieudonné and Jean de Boë to the Bagno of French Guiana on Devil's Island
