= Rirette Maîtrejean =

French anarchist and feminist (1887–1968)

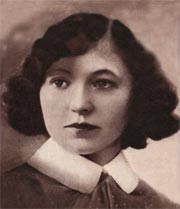
- Born: Anna Estorges; 14 August 1887; Tulle, France
- Died: 11 June 1968 (aged 80); Limeil-Brévannes, France
- Known for: Individualist anarchist
- Movement: Anarchism
- Partners: Louis Maîtrejean; Victor Serge; Maurice Vandamme
- Children: 2

Henrirette Maîtrejean, known as "Rirette", was the pseudonym of Anna Estorges (14 August 1887 – 11 June 1968). She was a French individualist and illegalist anarchist born in Tulle who collaborated on the French individualist anarchism magazine L'Anarchie along with Émile Armand and Albert Libertad. While participating in the journal she gave talks on anarcha-feminist and free love subjects. The first issue to bear her name as editor was published on 13 July 1911.

== Biography ==
Rirette Maîtrejean converted to anarchism at the age of 16, and at 17 married anarchist Louis Maîtrejean; the two moved to Paris in 1905. She separated from him at some point after, and in 1909 became involved with Victor Serge, bringing her two daughters to live with him. In his autobiography Serge describes her at the time as "a short, slim, aggressive girl, militant, with a Gothic profile."

In 1911, when she became editor of L'Anarchie, its headquarters in Romainville functioned as an anarchist commune, where she, her children, and Serge lived, along with Octave Garnier and Marie Vuillemin, Eduard Carouy and Jeanne Belardi, René and Anna Valet, and Raymond Callemin. The commune eventually broke apart for ideological reasons (Rirette and Victor were seen as less committed to illegalism than the others), and because various members were concerned they would be arrested if they stayed; Rirette and Victor remained.

Rirette Maîtrejean and Victor Serge were first arrested in connection with the investigation of the Bonnot Gang in January 1912. Neither were accused of taking part in the gang's shootings or thefts, but L'Anarchie had been identified as a meeting point for the gang, and Rirette was found to have two Browning pistols, the same weapon used by the gang. At this time, Rirette was released, but Serge remained in prison. She was arrested twice more in the next two months to put further pressure on the members of the gang who remained at large. When the case went to trial later that year, she and Serge were cast as theoreticians central to the criminal conspiracy, due to their work for L'Anarchie, despite the fact that nether took part in any of the gang's criminal actions. They tried to show the court that they were unrelated to the crimes and were only on trial in the first place because of their political activities, a defence that had been successful in the Trial of the Thirty. However, this argument in defence was hampered by the fact that neither wished to imply that their co-defendants were guilty of the crimes they'd been accused of - and by the earlier discovery of the Brownings in their possession. Ultimately, all three women (Rirette, Marie Vuillemin, and Barbe), were declared not guilty, thanks to the benevolent sexism of the jurors. Victor Serge, however, was sentenced to prison, and the two never saw each other again.

Six months after the trial, she sold her memoir, Souvenirs d'anarchie, to the liberal French daily, Le Matin. It denounced illegalism, and was seen by individualist anarchists as a sell-out. But Maîtrejean was not alone among anarchists in denouncing illegalism at this time; someone, probably Kropotkin, took to the pages of Freedom to blame them for the repression anarchists were facing in the years leading up to the First World War.
