= Bonnot Gang =

French criminal anarchist group

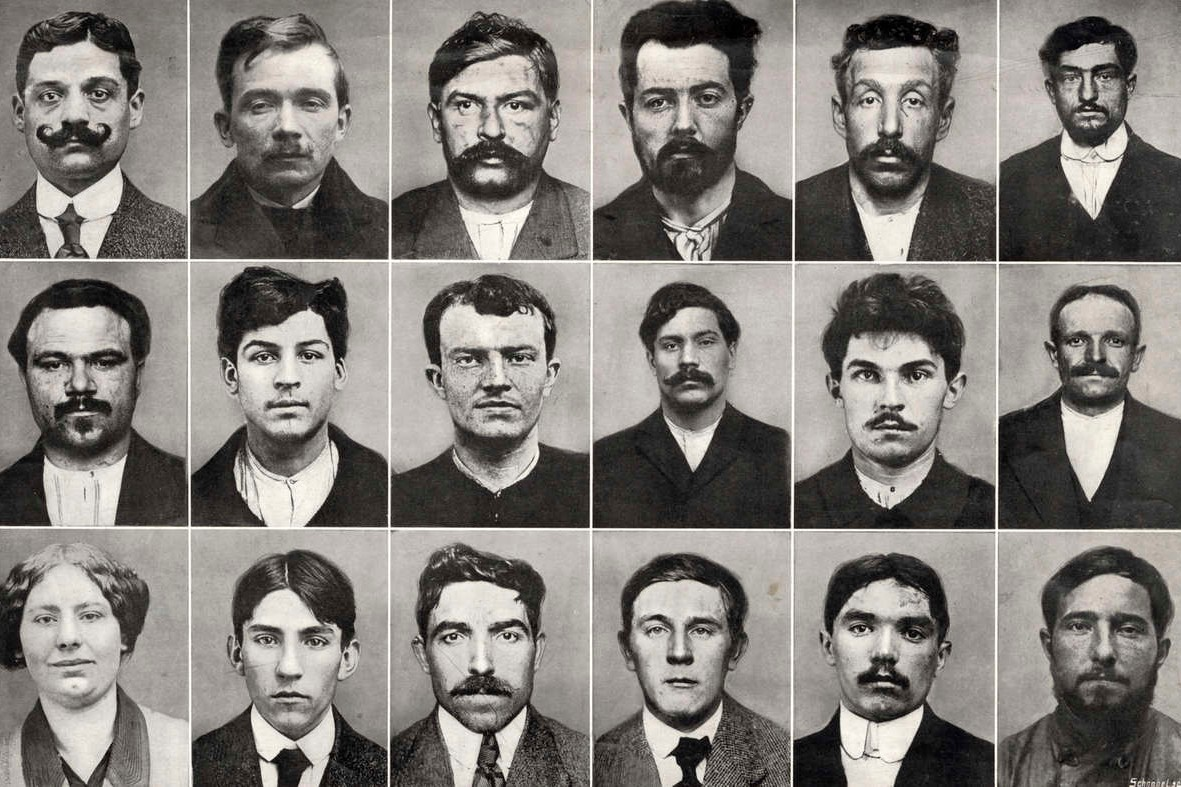
- Some members of the Bonnot gang, including (from top left): Eugène Dieudonné, Jules Bonnot, Antoine Gauzy, Arthur Mallet, Pierre Cardi, Marius Metge, Edouard Carouy, Octave Garnier, René Valet, Joseph Renard, Émile Bachelet, Louis Rimbault, Marie Vuillemin, André Soudy, Étienne Monier, Raymond Callemin, Jean De Boë, and Bernard Godoresky.
- Leader: Jules Bonnot
- Dates active: 1911–1912
- Active regions: France and Belgium
- Ideology: Anarchism; Individualist anarchism; Illegalism
- Political position: Far-left
- Status: Defunct

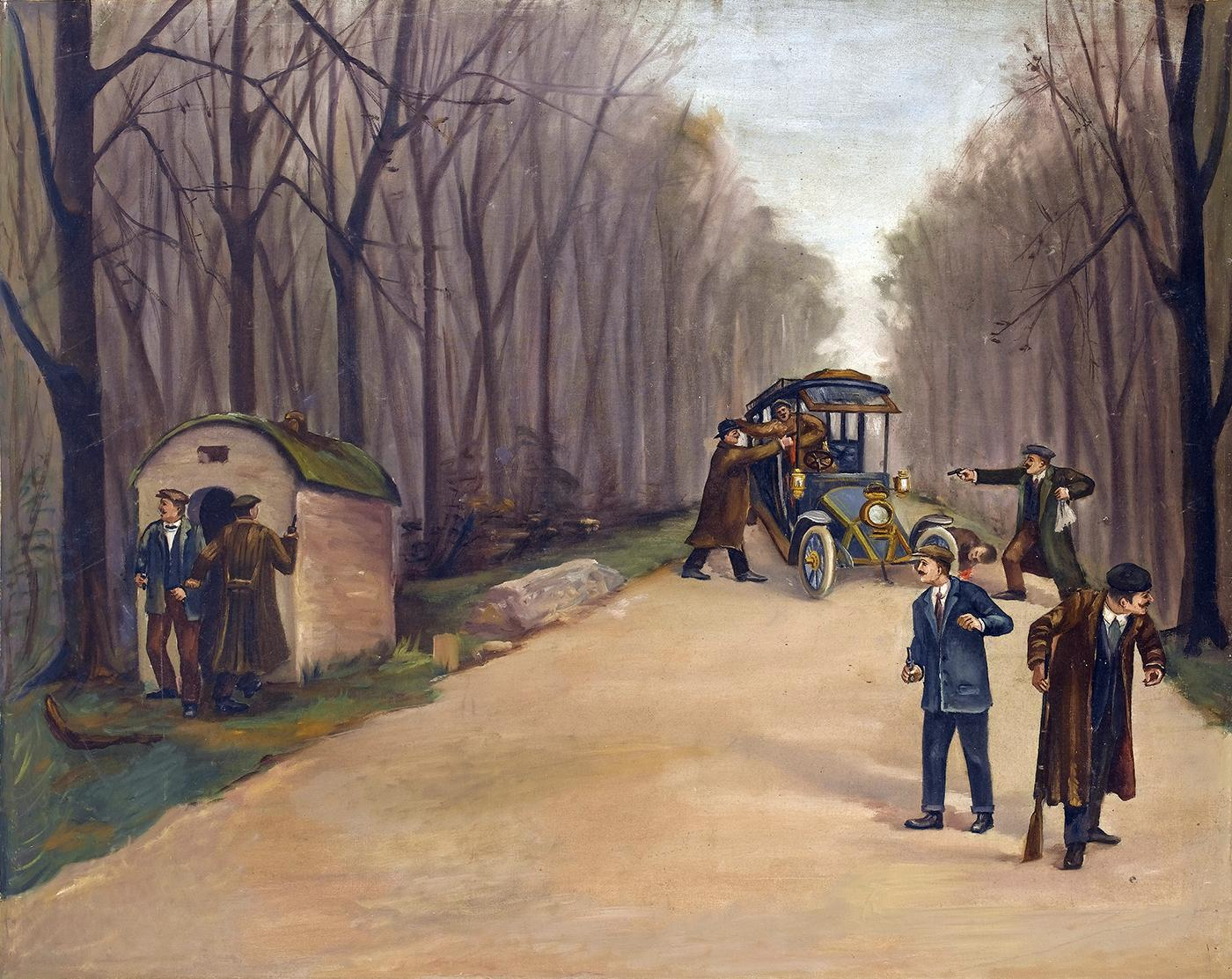
A 1912 illustration of the Bonnot Gang stealing an automobile in the Forest of Senart.

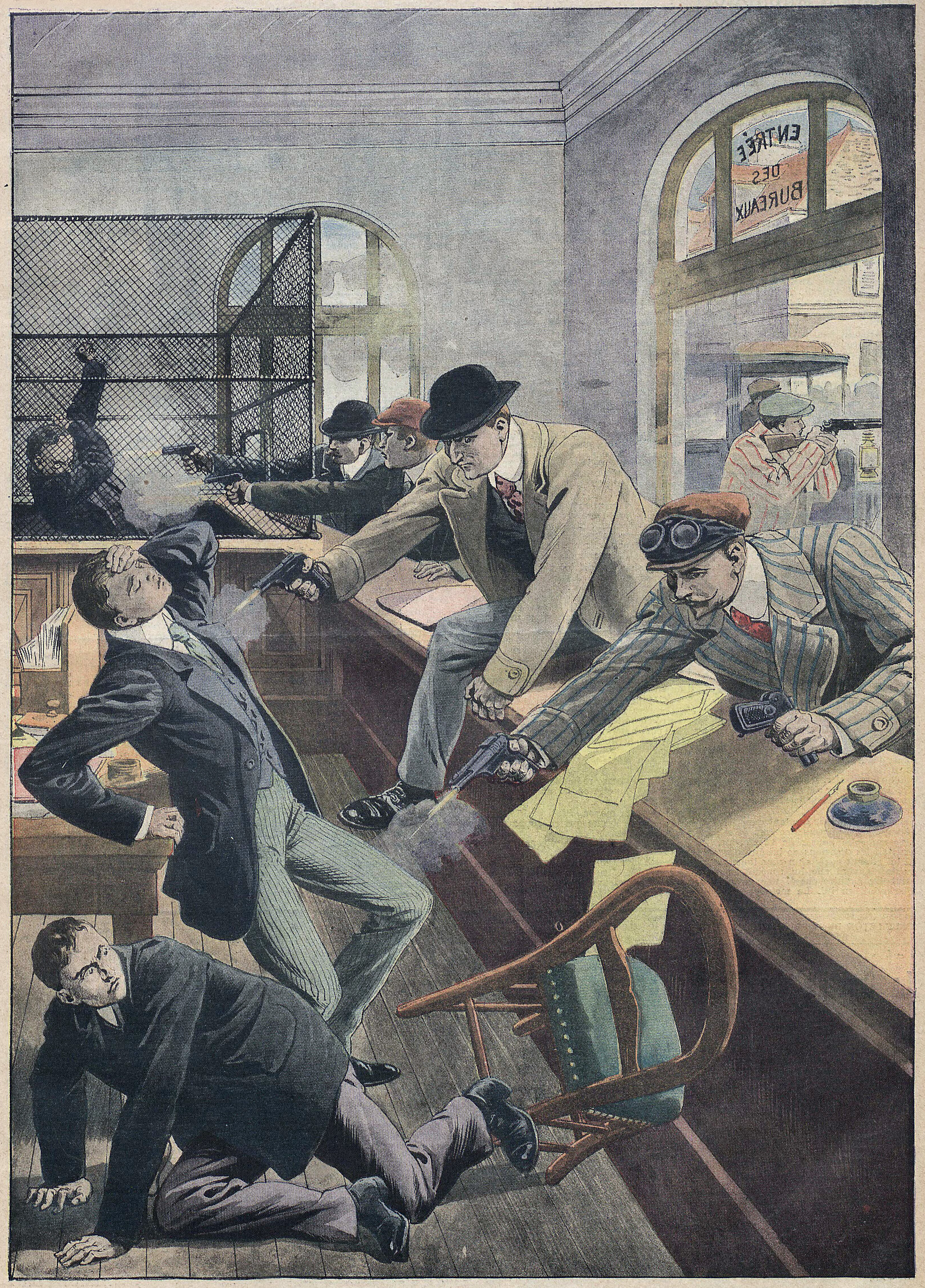
Illustration of the robbery of Société Générale Bank in Chantilly on 25 March 1912

The Bonnot Gang (French: La Bande à Bonnot [la bɑ̃d a bɔno]), or The Tragic Bandits (Les Bandes Tragiques), was a French anarchist group which operated in France and Belgium during the late Belle Époque from 1911 to 1912. Composed of individuals who identified with the illegalist milieu, the gang used new technology, such as cars and repeating rifles not then available to the police.

The press originally referred to them as simply "The Auto Bandits", as they carried out the first motorized robberies and bank raids in world history, killing at least four people in the process and injuring several more. They have been called the "inventors of the motorized get-away". The group also earned the moniker Les bandes tragiques from the press due to a sense of the group's "desperate courage", who were painted as tragicomic figures for their working-class origins and espoused anarchist politics. Ultimately, the gang became known by the title of "The Bonnot Gang" after Jules Bonnot gave an interview at the office of Le Petit Parisien, a popular daily paper. Bonnot's perceived prominence within the group was later reinforced by his high-profile death during a shootout with French police in Choisy-le-Roi.

While many of the gang's members originated from regions across France and Belgium, such as Lyon, Brussels, Charleroi, and Alais, they congregated in the city of Paris. Only some decades after the Paris Commune of 1871 and the wave of anarchist of the 1890s, and not long after the General Strike of 1906 organized by the Confédération Générale du Travail (CGT), Paris was a hotbed of anarchist debate and organizing between the anarcho-individualists (such as the illegalists) and anarcho-communists and anarcho-syndicalists.

== Crime spree ==
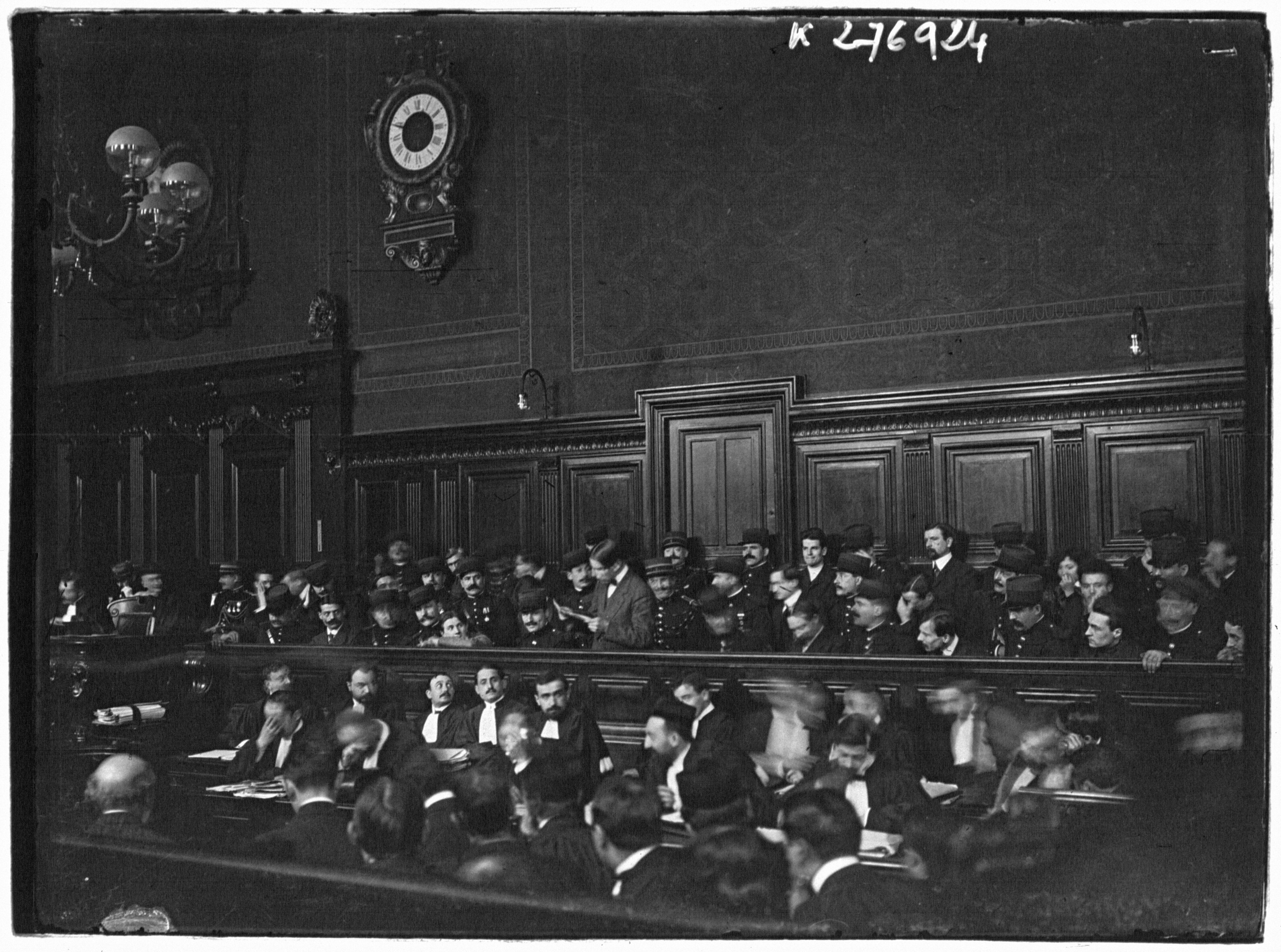
Courtroom photo from the Bonnot Gang mass trial at the Palais de Justice, February 3-27, 1913.

The first robbery by Bonnot's Gang was on 21 December 1911 at the AB Branch of Société Générale Bank, located at 148 rue Ordener in the 18th Arrondissement of Paris. They shot a collection clerk in the neck and lung (yet he survived) and snatched his cash bags.

On 25 March 1912, the gang stole a de Dion-Bouton automobile in the Forest of Sénart south of Paris by shooting the driver through the heart. They drove into Chantilly, north of Paris, where they robbed the local branch of Société Générale Bank, and fatally shot two bank cashiers and severely wounded a bookkeeper.

Sûreté Chief Xavier Guichard took the matter personally. Even politicians became concerned, increasing police funding by 800,000 francs. Banks began to prepare for forthcoming robberies and many cashiers armed themselves. The Société Générale promised a reward of 100,000 francs for information that would lead to arrests.

== Members ==
=== Gang members included ===
- Émile Bachelet
- Barthélémy Baraille
- David Bélonie
- Kléber Bénard
- Émile Bill
- Jules Bonnot
- Raymond Callemin
- Édouard Carouy
- Henri Crozat de Fleury
- Jean de Boë
- Jean Dettweiller
- Eugène Dieudonné
- Anna Dondon
- Jean Dubois (anarchist)
- Octave Garnier
- Antoine Gauzy
- Bernard Gorodesky
- Boniface Grau
- Louise Hutteaux
- Pierre Jourdan
- Victor Serge
- Barbe Le Clerch
- Rirette Maîtrejean
- Marius Metge
- Étienne Monier
- Jean-Baptiste Pancrazi
- Joseph Platano
- Jean-Marcel Poyer
- Charles Reinert
- Louis Rimbault
- Léon Rodriguez
- André Soudy
- Judith Thollon
- René Valet
- Marie Vuillemin

=== Mugshots of Bonnot Gang members ===
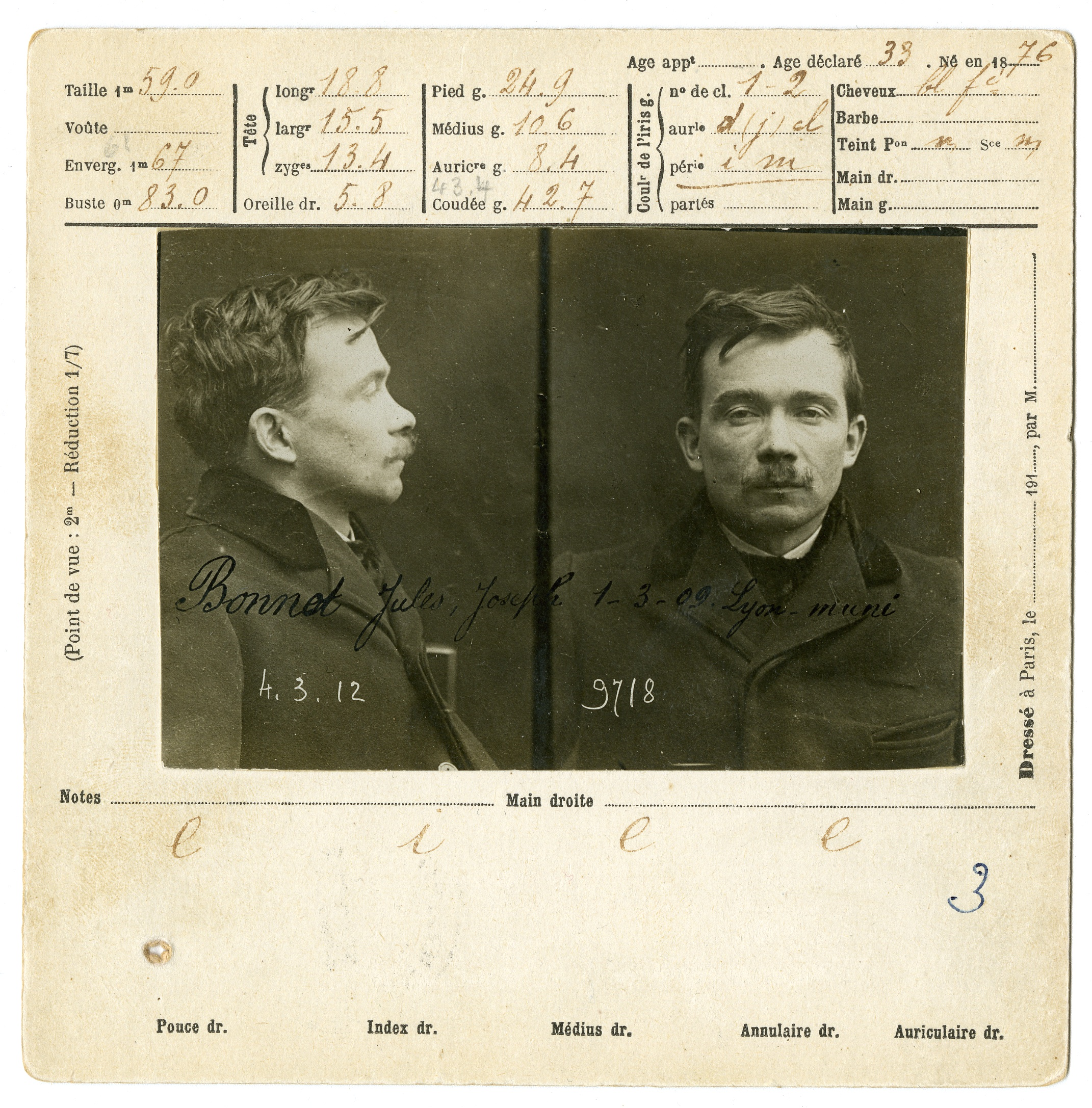
Jules Bonnot, shot dead by law enforcement officers in France

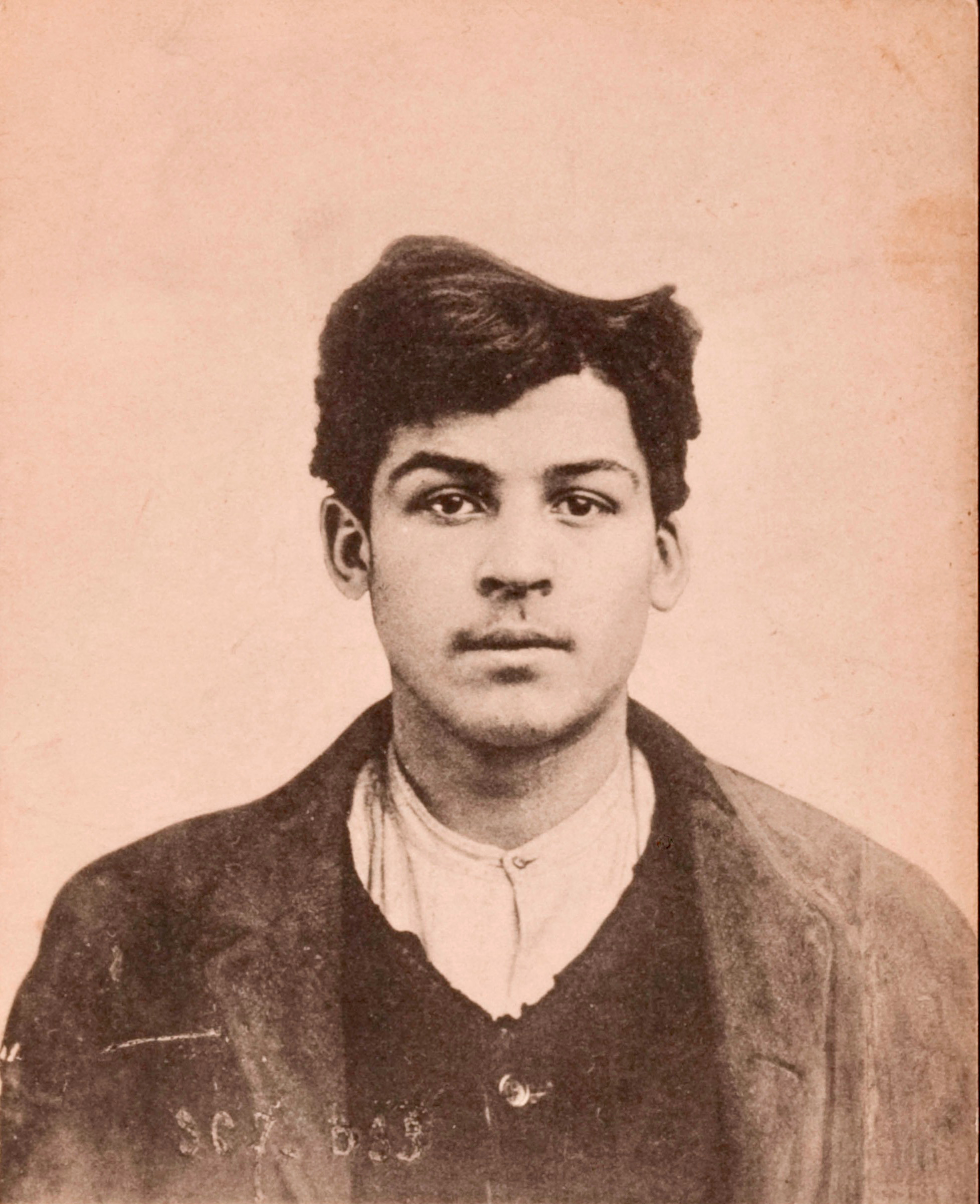
Octave Garnier, shot while unconscious during a police raid on his safe house.

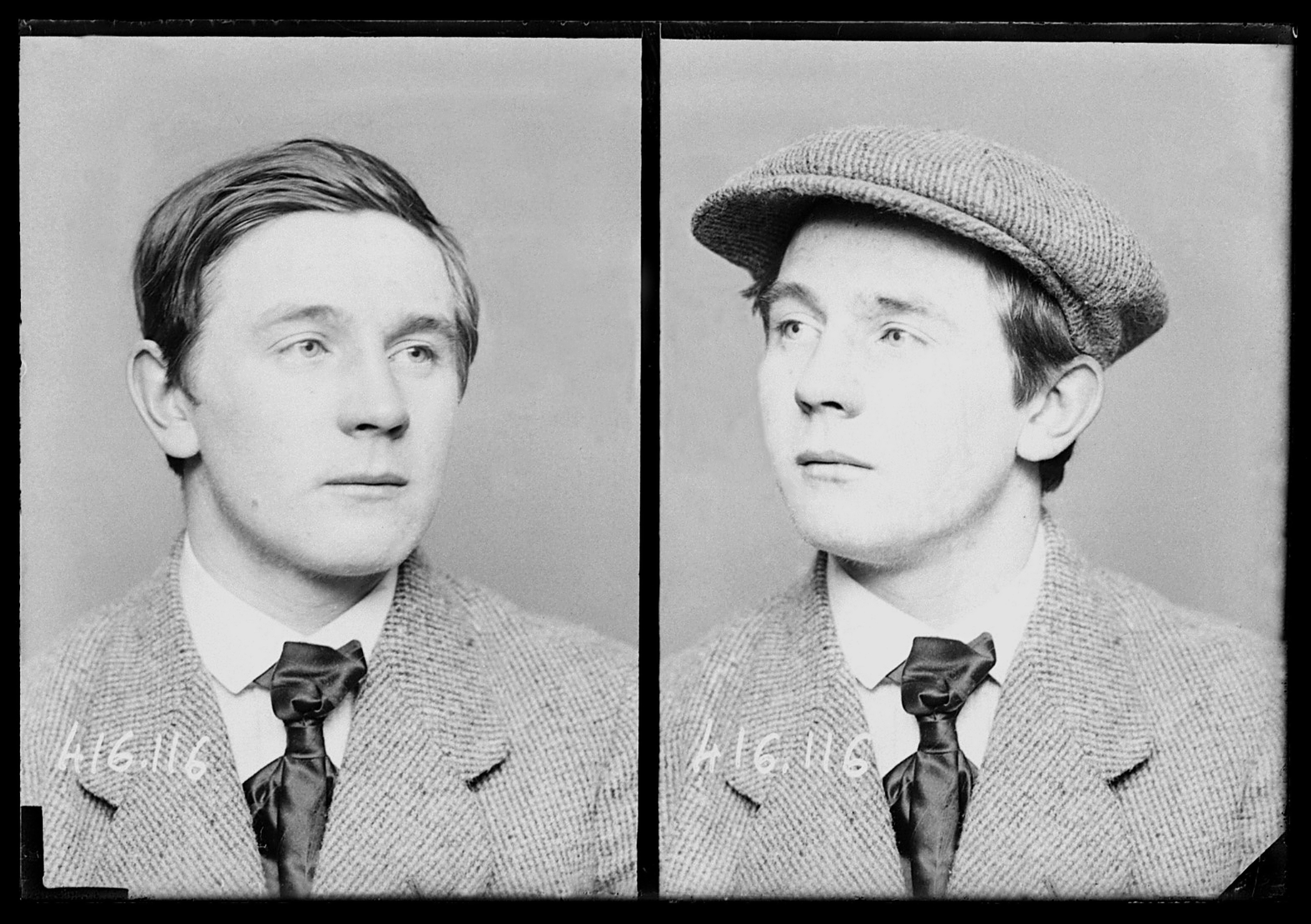
Raymond Callemin, executed by guillotine

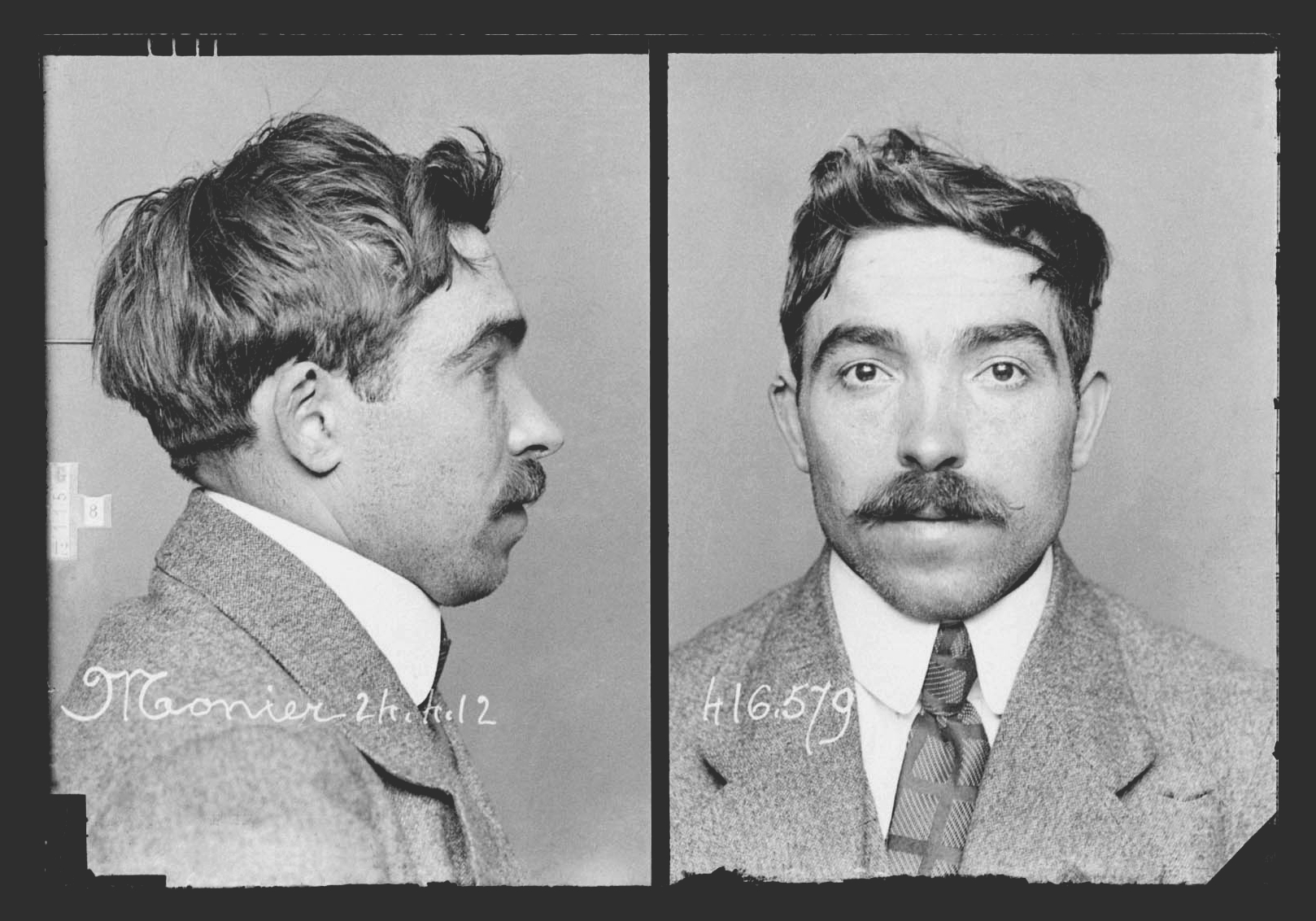
Étienne Monier, executed by guillotine

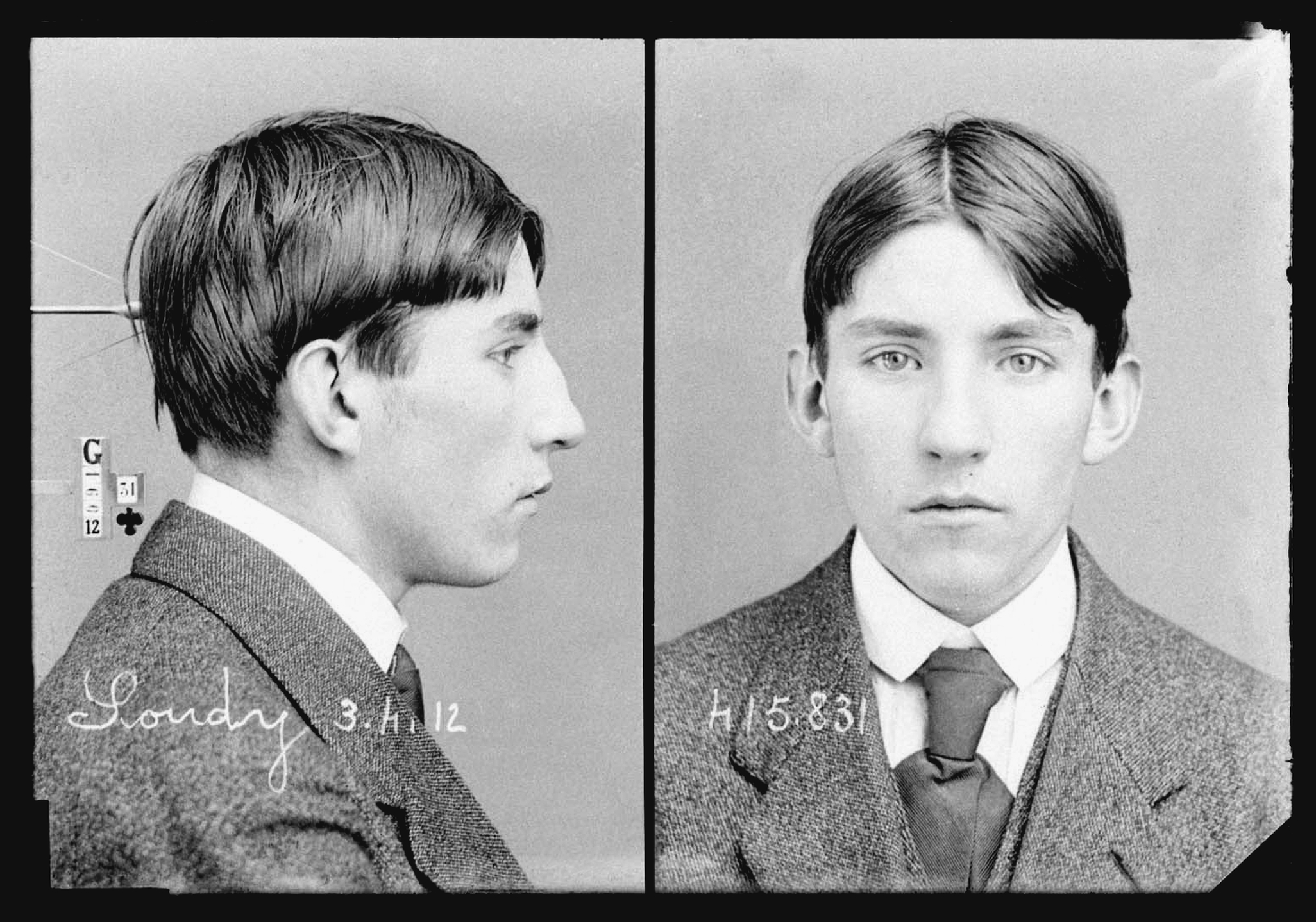
André Soudy, executed by guillotine

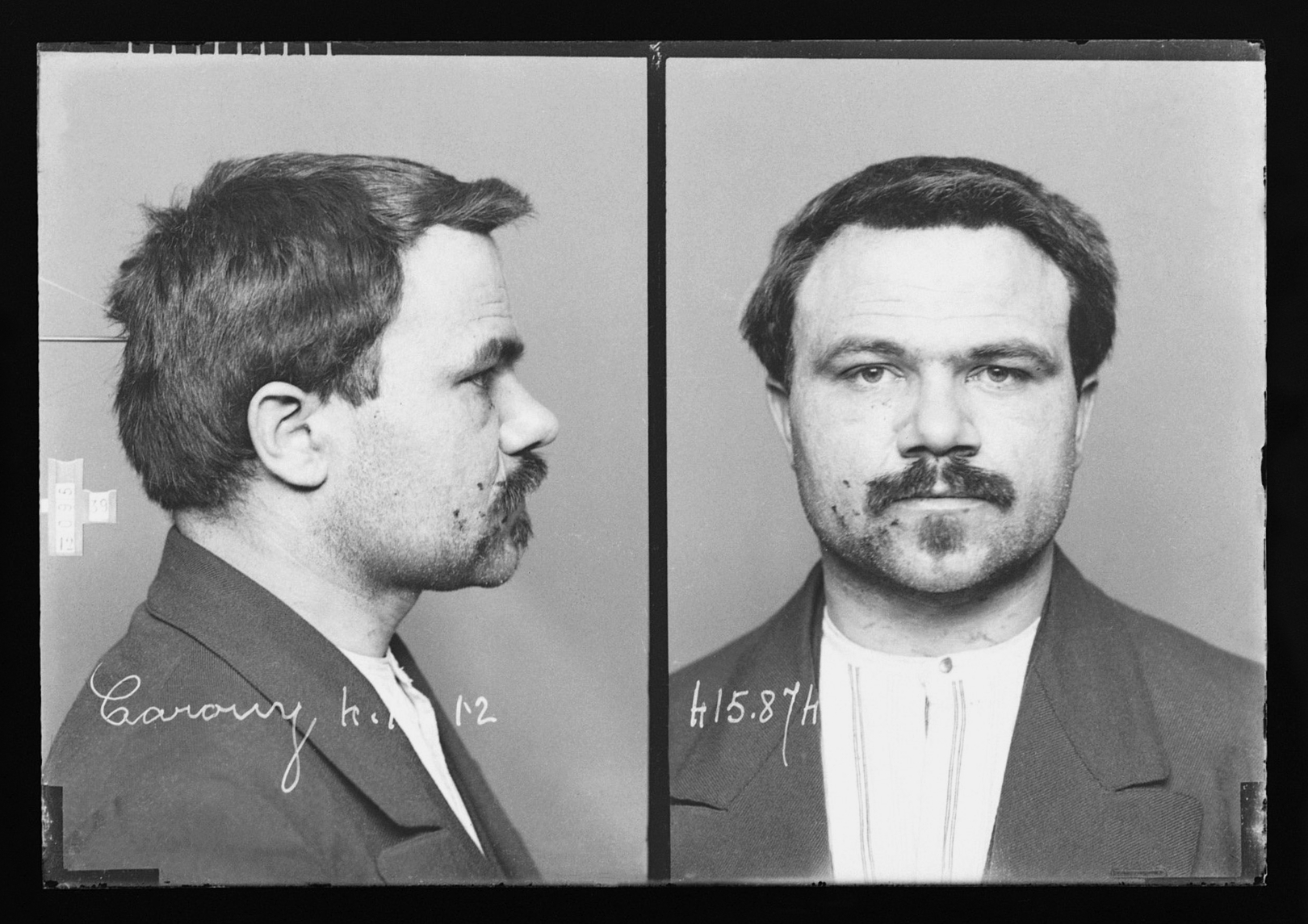
Edouard Carouy, nicknamed "Leblanc", sentenced to life in prison but died immediately after sentencing using a cyanide pill hidden in his shoe.

== Primary sources ==
- Raymond Callemin "Mémoires de Callemin dit Raymond la Science" (Memoirs of Raymond 'the Science' Callemin) - Wikisource French

a notable member of the Bonnot Gang

== See also ==
- Anarchism in France
- Anarchism in Belgium
- La Bande à Bonnot, 1968 film (in French)
- Flavio Costantini, Italian painter who featured the Bonnot Gang in his works
- Les Brigades du Tigre
- Expropriative anarchism
- Illegalism
- Individualist anarchism
- Left-wing terrorism
- Propaganda of the deed
- Les Vampires, 1915–16 serial
