= Marie Vuillemin =

Belgian anarchist (1889–1963)

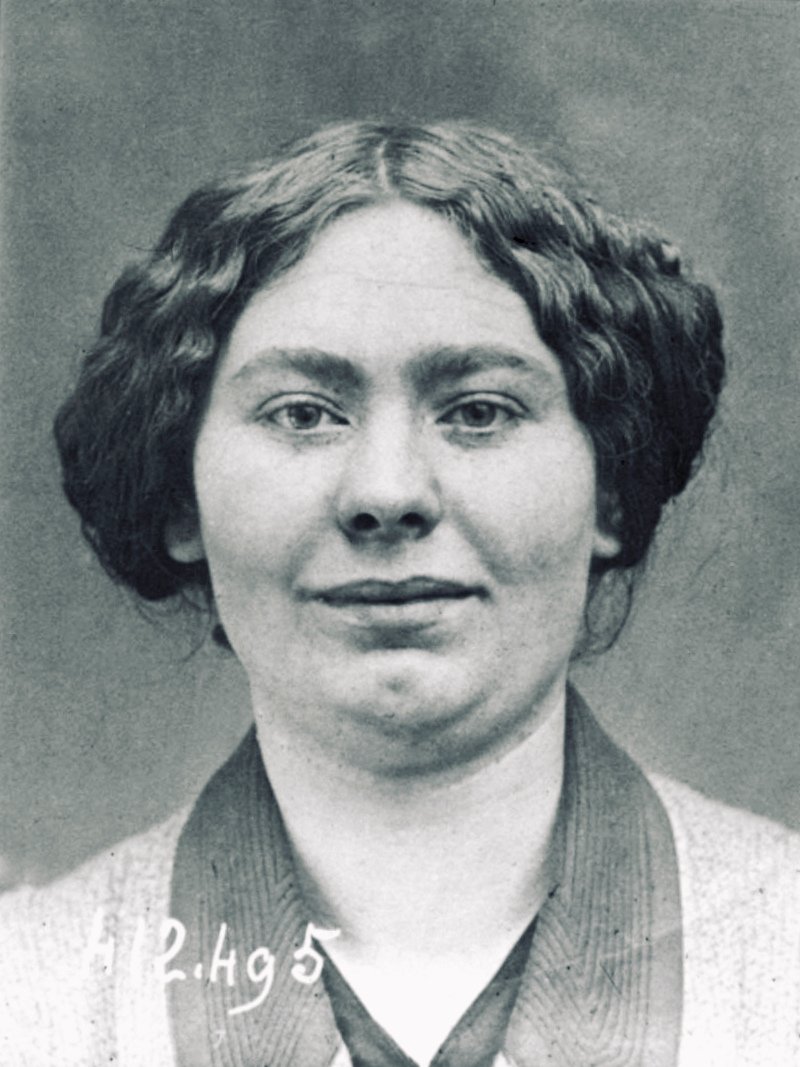
- Vuillemin (22 January 1912)
- Born: 14 May 1889; Mons, Wallonia, Belgium
- Died: 1963 (aged 73–74); Charleroi, Wallonia, Belgium
- Other name: "La Belge" ("The Belgian")
- Years active: 1910–1913
- Organization: Bonnot Gang
- Movement: Individualist anarchism, illegalism
- Partner: Octave Garnier (1910–1912)

Marie Félicie Vuillemin (14 May 1889 – 1963) was a Belgian individualist anarchist, known for her involvement with the Bonnot Gang. Born in Mons, she met the French anarchist Octave Garnier while working at an inn in Charleroi. Jointly suspected of robbing her workplace, they fled to Paris, where they joined a commune at the publishing house of the individualist anarchist magazine L'Anarchie.

Their illegalist activities led to their involvement with the Bonnot Gang, with Garnier participating in numerous robberies and becoming a fugitive. Vuillemin was arrested on suspicion of participating, but was released due to a lack of evidence. Before long, she rejoined Garnier and other members of the Bonnot Gang in Nogent-sur-Marne, but their house was raided by police; Vuillemin was arrested and Garnier killed. Vuillemin was ultimately acquitted of all charges.

== Biography ==
Marie Félicie Vuillemin was born on 14 May 1889, in the Walloon city of Mons. At the age of twenty, she moved to Paris for work. There she married a local painter, known as Schoofs, but they had an unhappy marriage as he was a violent husband. After only a month she abandoned him and fled. In June 1910, she returned to Belgium and found work as a waitress in Charleroi. There she met the French anarchist Octave Garnier; the two fell in love with each other and left for the Belgian capital of Brussels. They were suspected of robbing Vuillemin's workplace before leaving, and in April 1911, were forced to flee Belgium back to Paris.

=== Communal life ===
Vuillemin and Garnier found lodgings at the printing house of the individualist anarchist magazine L'Anarchie, located in Romainville. Before long, it became a safe house for many more exiled Belgian anarchists, including Jean de Boë, Raymond Callemin, Édouard Carouy, and Victor Serge. The house in Romainville was transformed into a commune, where its inhabitants practiced naturism, vegetarianism and physical fitness, supporting their lifestyle through theft. On Sunday mornings, Vuillemin and Garnier would go for bike rides down to the Marne, where they would relax on boats together with the commune's other couples. True to their principles of illegalism, the commune's members adopted nicknames to avoid being identified or tracked; Vuillemin took the name La Belge (English: The Belgian). The commune collapsed towards the end of August 1911, after Carouy disappeared after police suspected him of participating in a robbery. Garnier and Vuillemin left Romainville in early September.

=== Involvement with the Bonnot Gang ===
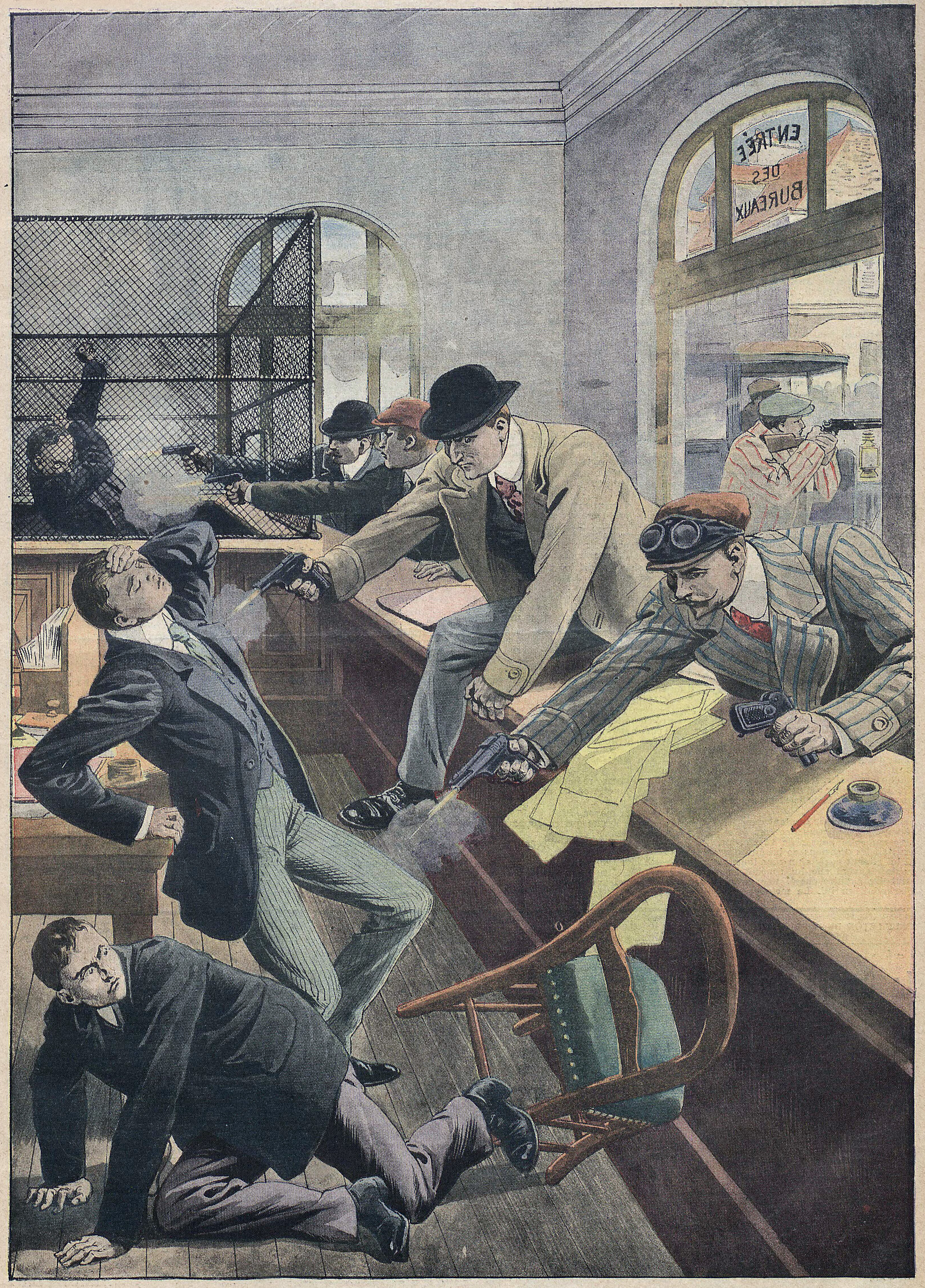
Illustration of the robbery of the Société Générale by the Bonnot Gang

The couple moved into Garnier's mother's house in Vincennes, living an ostensibly normal life while meeting with other members of what became the Bonnot Gang. Garnier himself began to participate in their robberies. After the Bonnot Gang carried out an armed robbery against the Société Générale, the police initiated an intensive search operation to find the culprits. After hearing that Jean Dettweiller had been arrested, on 31 December 1911, Garnier and Vuillemin left their house in Vincennes. Garnier and other accomplices rented a safe house in the 18th arrondissement of Paris, while Vuillemin went to stay at the offices of the individualist magazine L'Idée libre.

On 22 January 1912, the police raided L'Idée libre. There they arrested Vuillemin, on the suspicion of participation in the robbery. She confessed that she was living with Garnier and they searched their house, discovering photographs of him that a victim of the attack identified as one of the robbers. As more of their accomplices were arrested, Garnier discovered that his partner was in custody and his face was in all the newspapers. The police kept L'Idée libre under constant surveillance, hoping to catch more of the Bonnot Gang. The authorities ultimately found no evidence against Vuillemin and dismissed her case, releasing her on 21 March.

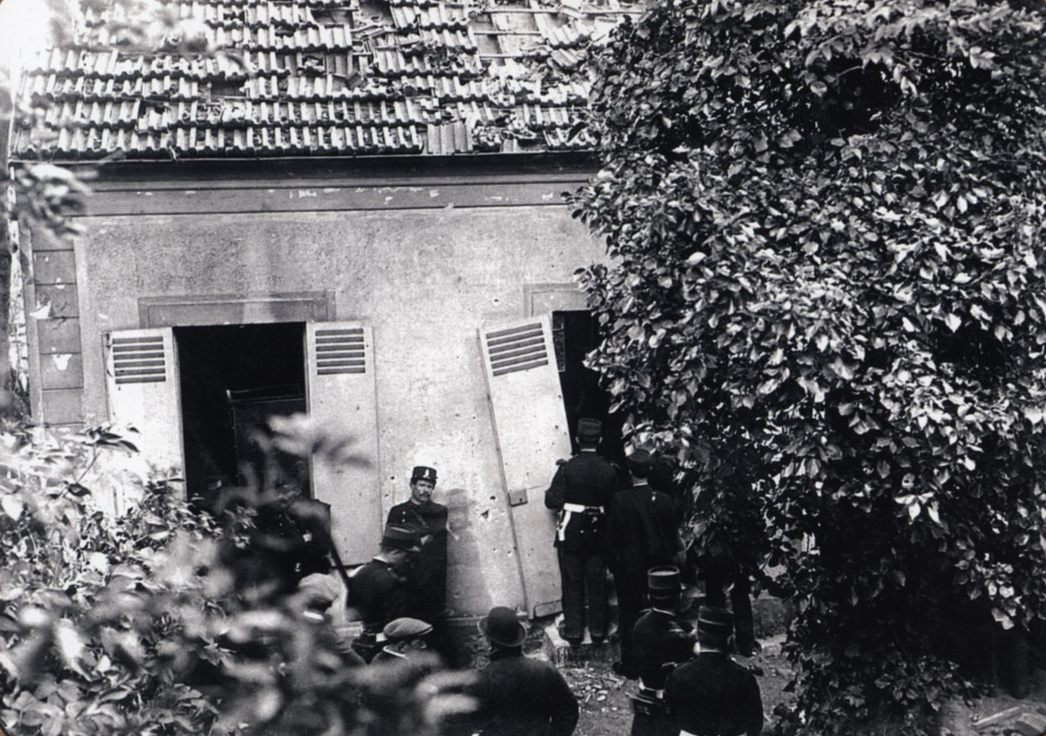
Police raid on Octave Garnier's house in Nogent-sur-Marne

Garnier, still a fugitive, began to deeply miss Vuillemin and considered meeting her in Vincennes, but initially decided against it due to the risk of capture. In early May, he ended up deciding to take the risk and reunited with her. She agreed to go with him to Nogent-sur-Marne, despite the risk of arrest or death. At their safe house, she cut her hair and dyed it dark brown, so that she could go food shopping without being identified. For appearances, the couple attempted to live a normal life in Nogent, playing music, gardening and exercising, and even once attending a local fête. However, the police were soon tipped off that Garnier was in Nogent, and on 14 May, commissioner Xavier Guichard dispatched fifty armed officers to apprehend him.

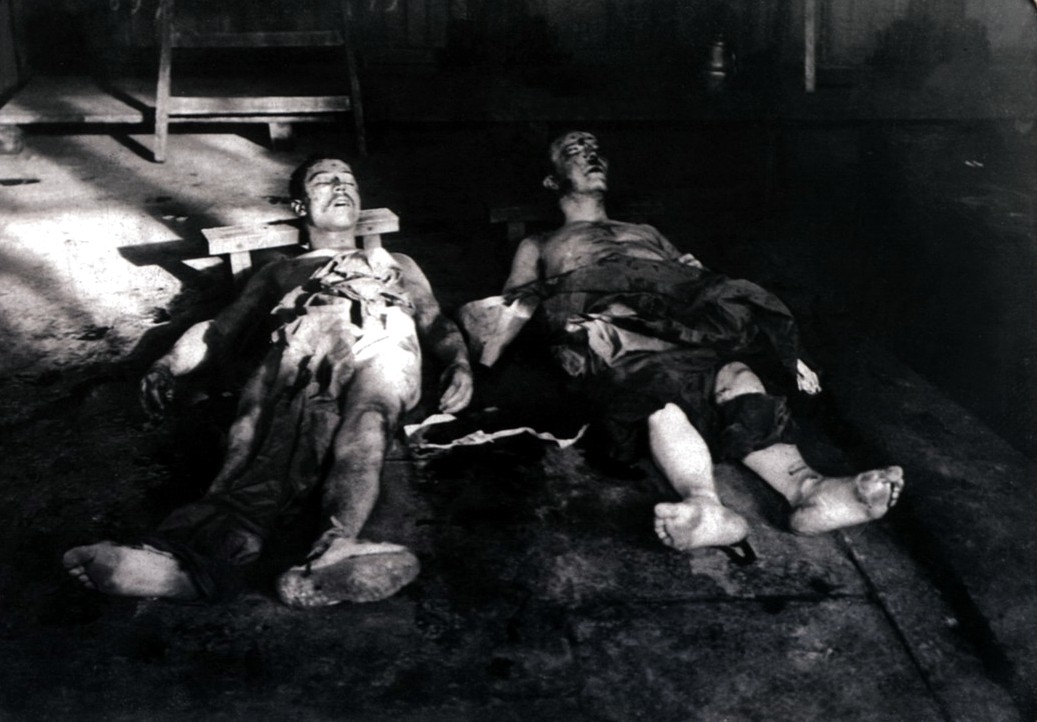
Dead bodies of Octave Garnier (left) and René Valet (right), after the police raid

That evening, while Vuillemin was cooking a vegetarian meal of macaroni and Garnier prepared potatoes and leeks, they heard a shout from their garden gate: "Surrender in the name of the Law!" A gun-battle ensued between the police on one side and René Valet and Garnier on the other. Prefect Louis Lépine ordered a ceasefire in order to allow the gang to surrender. Vuillemin quickly ran out of the house; she was taken into custody while the police finished their operation. The police bombarded the house with machine gun fire and explosives, covering a team's entry into the building, where they finally killed Valet and Garnier.

=== Imprisonment, trial and later life ===
Vuillemin was charged with complicity in theft. During her interrogation, she claimed she had only been involved with the Bonnot Gang due to her love for Garnier. She also gave up the names of Raymond Callemin, Étienne Monier and André Soudy. Together with the other two women of the Bonnot Gang, Rirette Maîtrejean and Barbe Le Clerch, Vuillemin was imprisoned in Saint-Lazare Prison. The imprisoned women were deprived of clothing, searched daily, and kept awake at night. While Maîtrejean attempted to use their sentence as an opportunity to teach Le Clerch how to read, Vuillemin retreated inwards, dissociating herself from her experience.

The trial of the Bonnot Gang commenced on 3 February 1913 at the Palais de Justice, which was kept under heavy security to prevent disruption. The judge declared that he would not allow the proceedings to become a political trial and banned political proclamations from being made. The public prosecutor Théodore Lescouvé opened the case by classifying the members of the Bonnot Gang into different categories: the principal offenders, the intermediaries, the harbourers, the firearms providers, and the women. The prosecution thus defined the women – Marie Vuillemin, Rirette Maîtrejean and Barbe Le Clerch – according to their gender, rather than their role in the gang's operations. During the trial, Vuillemin retracted her previous confessions, claiming they had been elicited from her under duress. Together with Maîtrejean and Le Clerc'h, Vuillemin was acquitted of all charges against her.

Vuillemin died in 1963, in Charleroi.

== Bibliography ==
- Parry, Richard (1987). The Bonnot Gang. London: Rebel Press. ISBN 0-946061-04-1.
- Steiner, Anne (2 May 2014). "VUILLEMIN Marie, Félicie [dit Marie la Belge]". Dictionnaire des anarchistes (in French). Paris: Le Maitron.
