= Étienne Monier =

French anarchist (1889–1913)

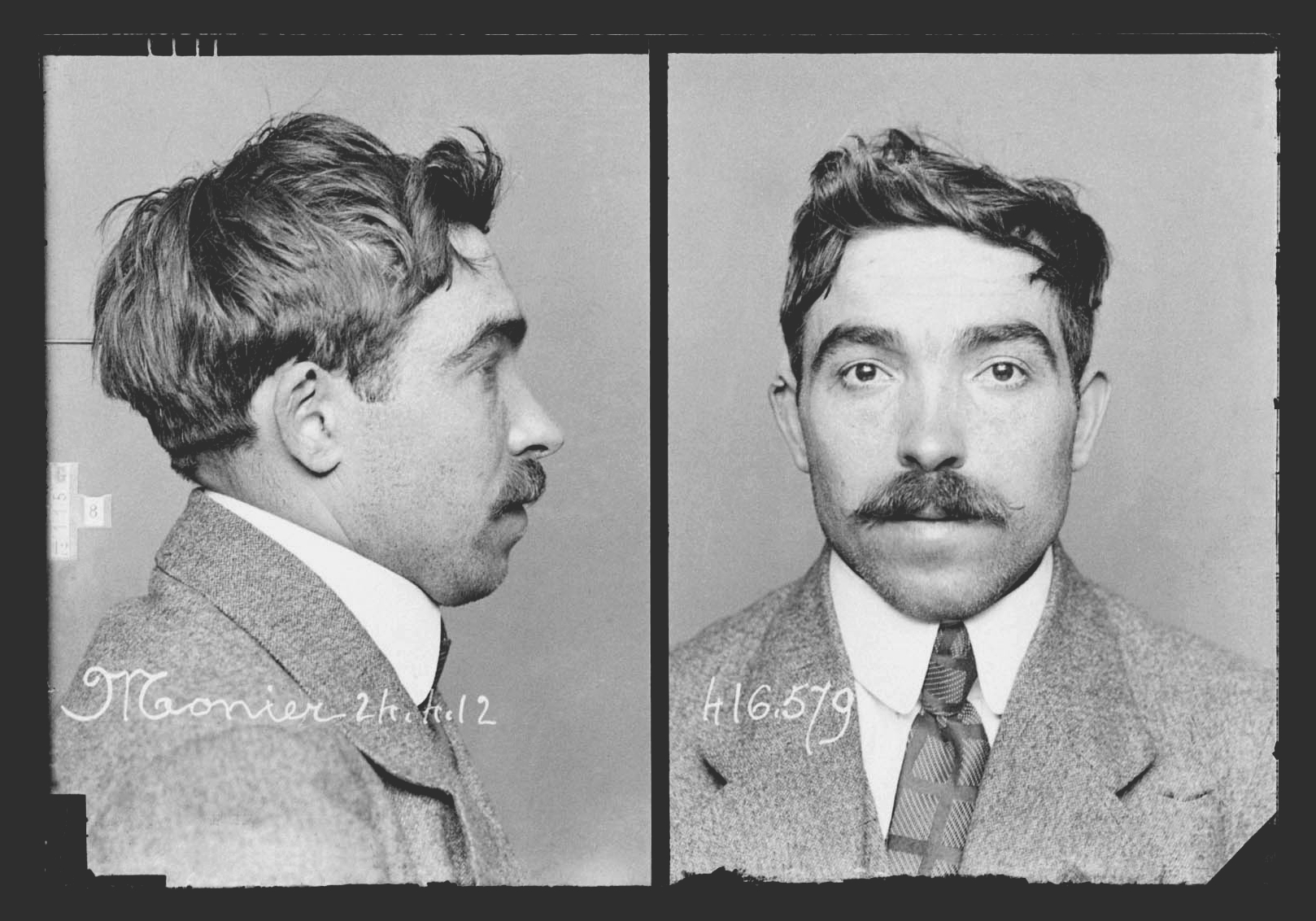
- A police photo of Étienne Monier in 1912.
- Born: April 20, 1889; Estagel
- Died: April 21, 1913 (aged 24); Paris
- Resting place: Ivry Cemetery
- Other name: Simentoff
- Organization: Bonnot Gang
- Movement: Insurrectionary anarchism, propaganda of the deed

Étienne Monier (20 April 1889 – 21 April 1913), also known as Élie Monier and nicknamed Simentoff, was a French anarchist and member of the infamous Bonnot Gang.

== Life ==
Étienne Monier was born into a family of winegrowers in Estagel, in Pyrénées-Orientales, a small town with a strong anarchist tradition since the local population resisted Napoléon III taking power in 1851. Monier himself was under police surveillance for his anarchism by the age of 16. Monier left home at 18 and found work as a gardener in Alais and Nîmes, before deciding to move to Paris in 1909, where he became close with André Lorulot. Monier and others like him disagreed with Léon Jouhaux, who advocated for revolutionaries to join the army and disseminate anarchist propaganda among the soldiers, so in December 1910 he left for Belgium to avoid military service. There, he took on the identity of an anarchist friend, Samuelis Simentoff, born in 1887 in Turkey. He returned to Paris by the end of 1910, settling in Romainville with other anarchists he met in Belgium. The group, including him, were vegetarians and teetotalers. In 1911, he worked with Joseph Renard as a travelling salesman and burglar.

In Paris, he met Victor Serge and Rirette Maîtrejean and, later, Jules Bonnot, leading him to become a member of the Bonnot Gang. While laying low in between the gang's escapades, he worked for some time in the shop of Antoine Gausy, an individualist anarchist, in Ivry-sur-Seine. On 25 March 1912, the gang, including Étienne Monier, stole a de Dion-Bouton automobile in the Forest of Sénart south of Paris and shot the driver through the heart. They drove into Chantilly, north of Paris, where they robbed the local branch of the Société Générale bank, shooting the bank's three cashiers. They escaped in their stolen automobile as two policemen tried to catch them, one on horseback and the other on a bicycle.

Gausy gave shelter to Bonnot later, though he told the police he had been introduced to him by Monier as a Russian revolutionary hiding out after the Lena massacre. When the police came to Gausy's shop on 24 April 1912, Bonnot killed Louis Jouin, the vice-chief of the French police, and escaped. On the same day, Monier was arrested in Belleville, in Paris.

The trial of the gang's survivors began on 3 February 1913. Monier was accused of shooting one of the bank employees, which he denied. Monier was sentenced to death with André Soudy and Raymond Callemin. All three were guillotined on 21 April 1913.

In his will, written in prison, he bequeathed his books to the Paris Municipal Library, and his gun to a Paris museum, "in memory of an innocent victim of an affair which threw the country into a state of terror". He was buried in Ivry Cemetery. Marie Besse, a seventeen-year-old shop assistant who had been Monier's lover, is said to have died two months later from the shock of his execution.
