= Sophie Burdet =

French seamstress (born 1882)

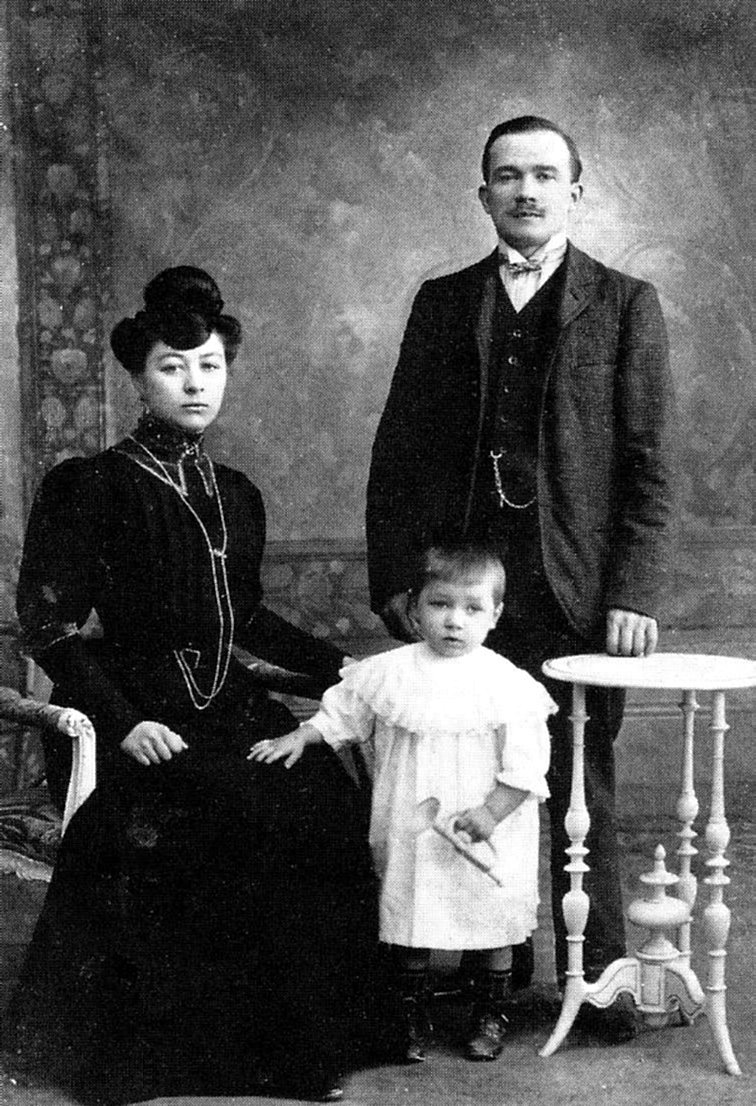
- Burdet (left) with her husband and child
- Born: Sophie Louise Eugénie Burdet; 16 February 1882; Vouvray, Ain, France
- Occupation: Seamstress
- Spouses: Jules Bonnot (m. 1905; div. 1912); Benoit Antoine Besson
- Children: Emilie Bonnot; Justin Bonnot
- Parents: Ferdinand Burdet (father); Emilie Friez (mother)

Sophie Louise Eugénie Burdet (b. 1882) was a French seamstress. At a young age, she married the anarchist Jules Bonnot and spent time moving from town to town with him, as he was unable to hold down a stable job. After giving birth to their son, she left him for another man and stayed away from her husband.

== Biography ==
Sophie Louise Eugénie Burdet was born in 1882, in the Arpitan town of Vouvray. She was the daughter of farmers and worked as a seamstress. In 1899, she met the anarchist Jules Bonnot, who at that time was lodging in her family's farmhouse while he was serving in the French Army. They fell in love and kept in touch through letters to each other. After Bonnot was demobilised in 1900, he returned to Vouvray and proposed to marry Burdet.

Burdet married Bonnot in August 1901, and the couple lived together for a time in Burdet's house. Within months, Burdet was pregnant with their first child. In early 1902, when she was four months pregnant, Bonnot lost his job at a factory in Bellegarde. Without any means to sustain themselves, the couple moved in with Burdet's mother in Geneva. In August 1902, Burdet gave birth to their daughter Émilie, but she died an infant only a few days later. The couple had not had the financial means to pay for their baby's medical treatment.

After Bonnot was deported from Switzerland back to France, the couple briefly stayed with Bonnot's family in Neuves-Maisons, before returning to Geneva. Sophie became pregnant again, giving birth to their son Justin in February 1904. As Bonnot still struggled to find stable work, Burdet put him in touch with a trade union secretary in Saint-Étienne named Benoit Antoine Besson. Besson managed to secure Bonnot a factory job in Lyon, and the family moved to the city, but Bonnot quickly lost his job there too.

In late 1905, Burdet began having an affair with Besson and the two eloped together with her son. She refused to return to her marriage with Bonnot, despite his repeated pleas. When he offered to divorce her in exchange for custody of their child, she refused. Following Bonnot's arrest and imprisonment in April 1912, Burdet managed to secure a divorce. At this time she was living in Annemasse, where she was discovered and interviewed by a journalist from Le Matin. Burdet described her anarchist ex-husband in unflattering terms. She said that money was the only thing he cared about, and that he would do anything to get it. Although she had not seen him for more than five years, she still recalled "the torments of betrayal, the revolting brutality of the miserable person to whom I had given myself."

== Biography ==
- Merriman, John (2017). Ballad of the Anarchist Bandits: The Crime Spree that Gripped Belle Époque Paris. Nation Books. ISBN 978-1-56858-988-6.
- Parry, Richard (1987). The Bonnot Gang. London: Rebel Press. ISBN 0-946061-04-1.
