= Xavier Guichard =

French archaeologist (1870–1947)

Xavier Guichard (1870–1947) was a French Director of Police, archaeologist and writer.

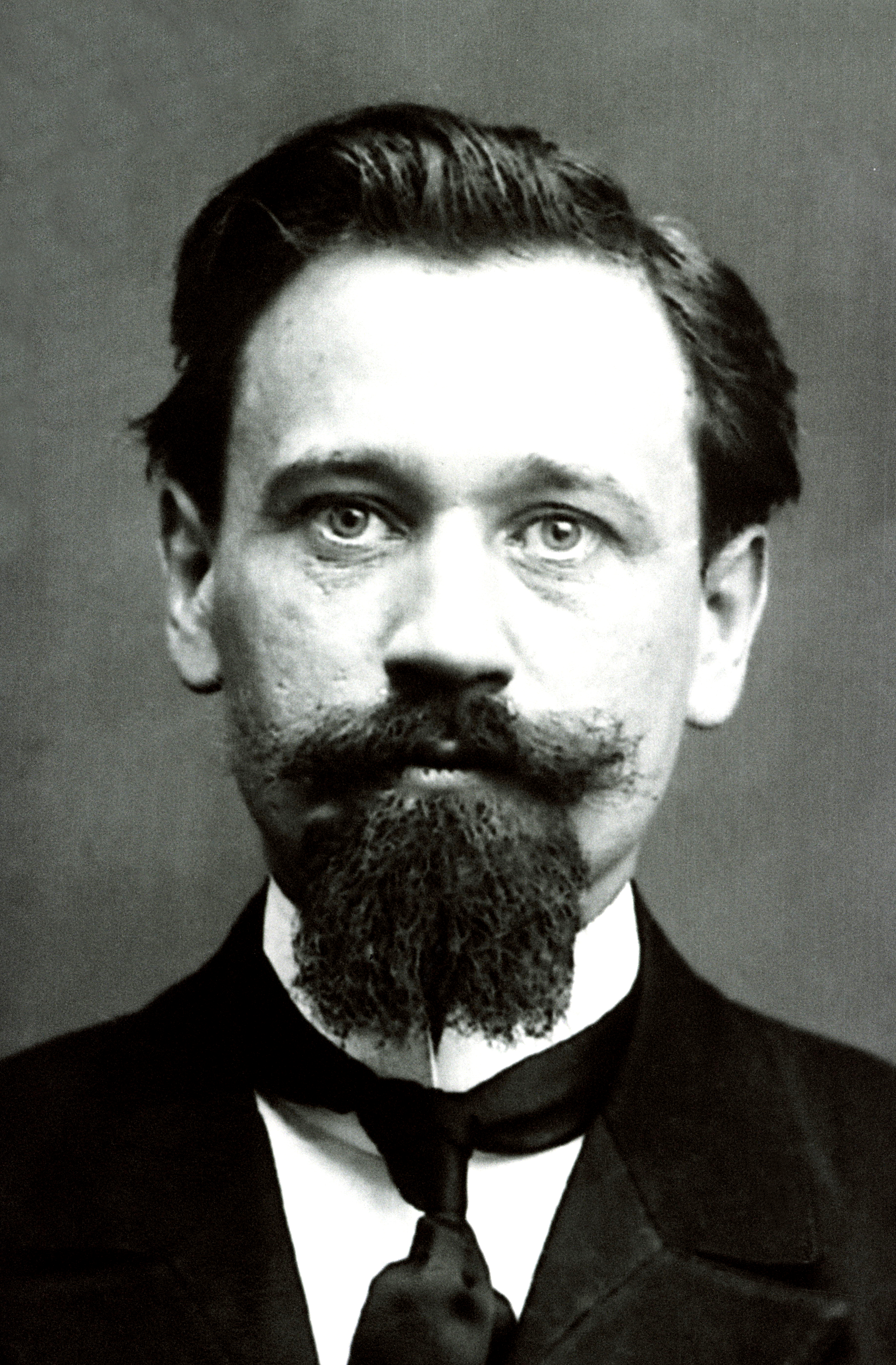
Xavier Guichard, ca.1900 - 1910

His 1936 book Eleusis Alesia: Enquête sur les origines de la civilisation européenne is an early example of speculative thinking concerning Earth mysteries, based on his observations of apparent alignments between Alesia-like place names on a map of France. His theories are analogous to those of his near-contemporary in the United Kingdom, Alfred Watkins, concerning Ley lines.

Xavier Guichard appears as a character in the novels of Georges Simenon, where he is the superior of the fictional detective Jules Maigret.

== See also ==
- 366 geometry
