= Jean de Boë =

Belgian typographer and anarchist (1889–1974)

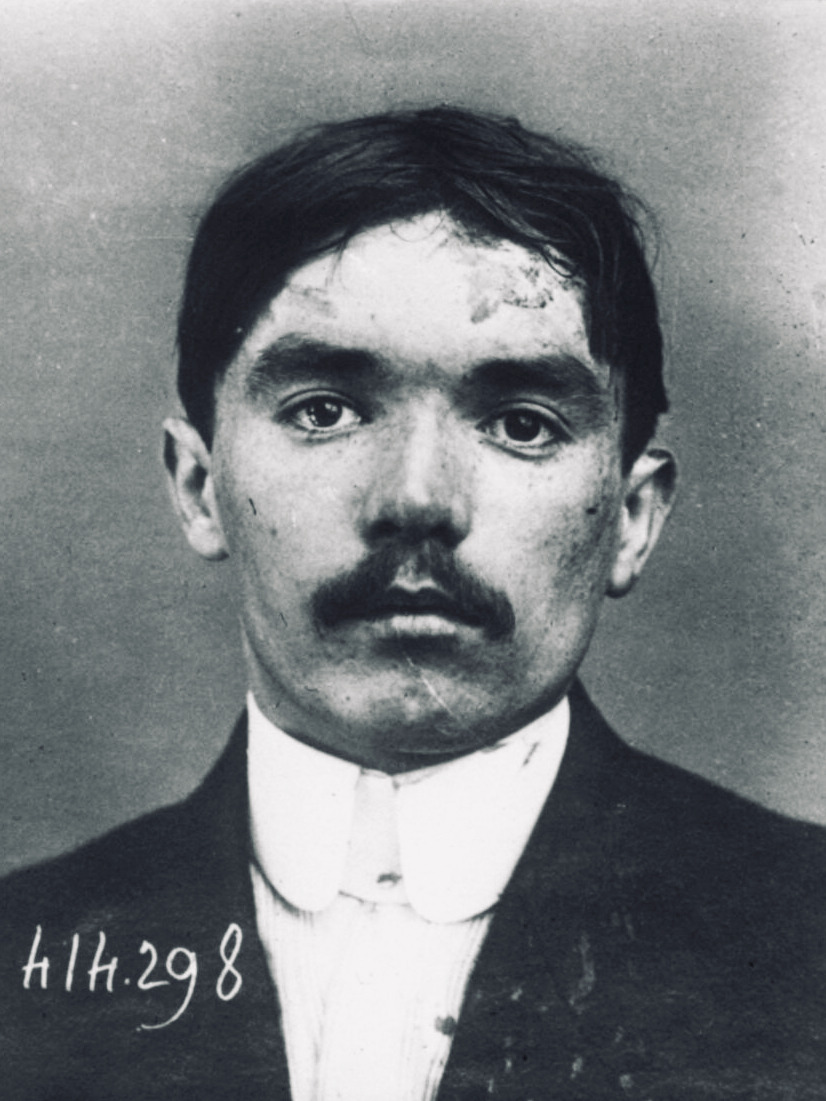
Jean Adelin De Boë

Jean Adelin De Boë (March 20, 1889 in Anderlecht (Brussels) – January 2, 1974 in Watermael-Boitsfort (Brussels)) was a typographer and anarchist.
