= Octave Garnier =

French bank robber (1889–1912)

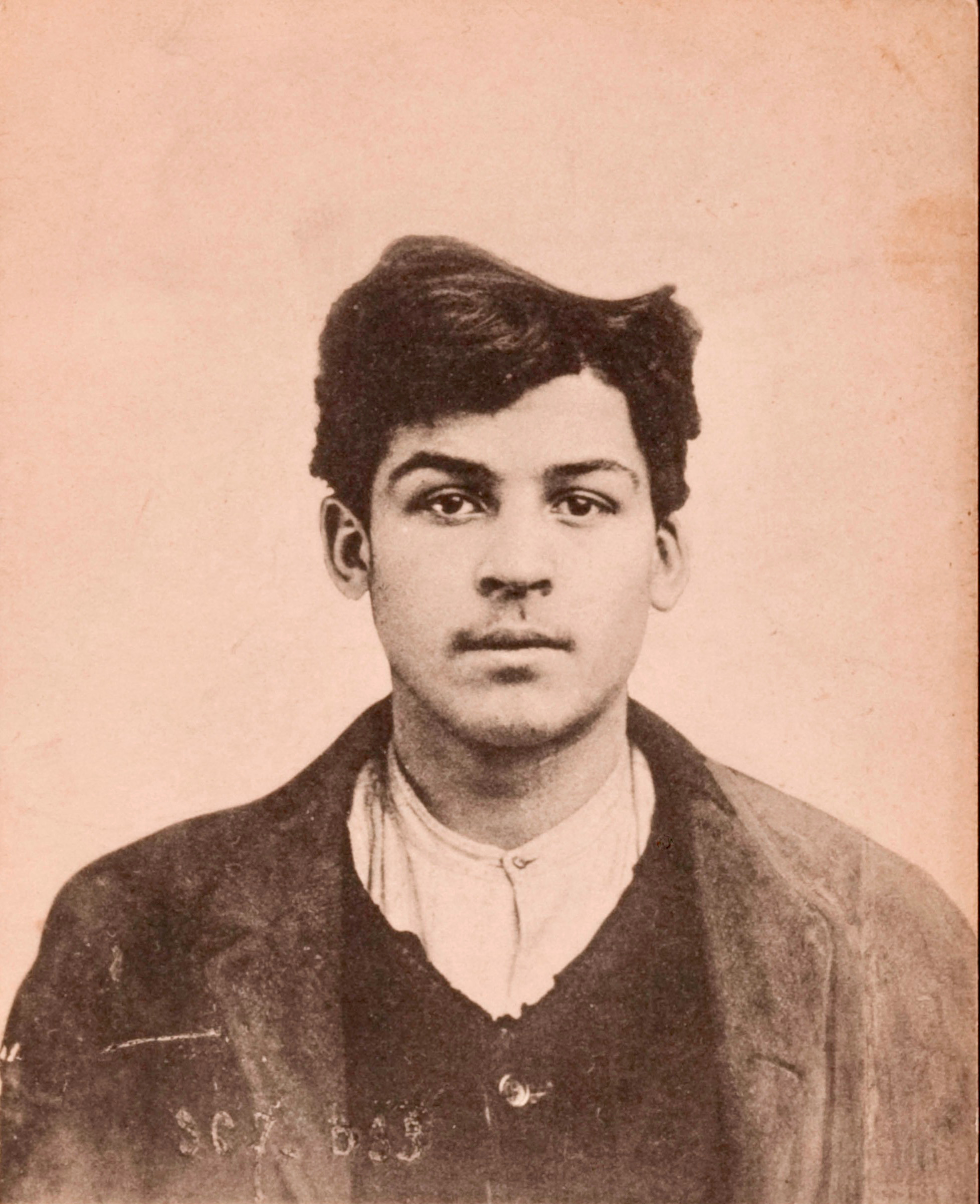
A police photo of Garnier who had served three prison terms by the age of 21.

Octave Garnier (25 December 1889 – 14 May 1912) was a French anarchist and founding member of the infamous Bonnot Gang.

== Life ==
Born in Fontainebleau, Seine-et-Marne to Élie Germain Garnier, a laborer, and Françoise Anastasie Desmurs, on Christmas Day 1889, Garnier worked as a butcher and baker at an early age. He took up theft at the age of thirteen and had served his first prison term by age seventeen. Garnier later wrote, "Prison had made me even more rebellious."

Following his release from prison, Garnier dabbled in and then became disillusioned with both union syndicalism and revolutionary politics before turning to anarchism.

Following two additional stints in prison (one for assault), Garnier fled to Belgium in 1910 to avoid France's military draft. Abroad, he learned the art of burglary and counterfeiting from anarchist associates. In April 1911, Garnier and his partner Marie Vuillemin moved to Romainville to live with future gang members Raymond Callemin, Jean De Boe, and Edouard Carouy as well as Victor Kibalchich, then editor of l'Anarchie. Within this group, Garnier's political sympathies grew rapidly towards illegalism, a radical form of individualist anarchism that was heavily influenced by German philosopher Max Stirner.

Following an ideological split within l'Anarchie, Garnier and Vuillemin moved to Paris and he began work as a navvy, participating in strikes at Chars, Marin, and Cergy. Working as a burglar on the side to make ends meet, he was unhappy with his lot and dreamed of bigger heists. It was at this point that Garnier, in consultation with Callemin, began to plan the activities of an anarchist gang – a group that would be known in the press as first, "The Auto Bandits," and later, "The Bonnot Gang".

== Death in Nogent-sur-Marne ==
On 14 May 1912, Garnier and René Valet were killed in a shootout with French authorities when their safe house in Nogent-sur-Marne was raided by police. Armed with seven 9 mm Browning semi-automatics and two long-barreled Mausers, the two outlaws, who had barricaded themselves inside the rental house, faced 50 detectives, 250 police from Paris, Republican Guards, and 400 Zouaves from Nogent. As the six-hour stand-off stretched on, Valet and Garnier burned 10,000 stolen francs but managed to hold back the army outside.

At midnight, having failed to remove the bandits, French authorities succeeded in positioning one and a half kilograms of melinite in the house. The resulting explosion rendered the structure's inhabitants unconscious, and Garnier was then executed by a 9 mm shot to the right temple. Both men were buried in unmarked graves.

A memoir, found by police on Garnier's body, explained his criminal activities and summed up: "It's for all these reasons that I rebelled, it's because I didn't want to live this life of present-day society, because I didn't want to wait and maybe die before I'd lived, that I defended myself against the oppressors with all the means at my disposal…"
