= Jane Morand =

French seamstress

- Born: 17 August 1887; Bey
- Died: 26 February 1969 (aged 81); Fitz-James
- Occupation: Anarchist

Jeanne Françoise Morand, known as Jane Morand (17 August 1887 – 26 February 1969), was a French seamstress, housekeeper, and individualist anarchist activist. A prominent figure in the French anarchist movement, she organized the Comité Féminin in the 1910s, one of the leading anarcha-feminist and feminist organizations of the time. Morand is also known for, along with Henriette Tilly, helping to spread feminism within anarchist circles and influencing Le Cinéma du Peuple in the decision to produce Les Misères de l’aiguille, likely the first feminist film in history.

Sentenced to life imprisonment for helping other anarchists in fleeing France during World War I, she was released in 1924. By 1932, she began to exhibit signs of mental disorders, including paranoid delusions, and ended her life in a miserable state, moving between various care institutions.

== Biography ==
Jeanne Françoise Morand was born in Bey on 17 August 1887, in Saône-et-Loire. Her father was an anarcho-syndicalist laborer, and she began working as a seamstress in Saint-Marcel. Later, at the age of 22, she left Saône-et-Loire for Paris, where she started reading Le Libertaire and attending anarchist public discussions. She had two sisters, Alice and Marie, who joined her in the capital and also became involved in French anarchist circles. During this period, she became an active militant and was arrested multiple times by the police for "disturbing public order, putting up posters, insults, assault and battery, rebellion, and participating in forbidden demonstrations". She did not hesitate to resist, defend herself, and even bite the police officers who arrested her. In 1906, for instance, along with Albert Libertad and a man named Millet, Morand was arrested for fighting with a subway inspector and a police officer.

For two years, Morand worked as a domestic servant for the Henry family on Boulevard Saint-Martin before leaving her job. She then moved into the headquarters of the individualist anarchist newspaper, L'Anarchie. The activist became involved with Albert Libertad before separating from him in early 1908, although she still assisted him during the final years of his life later that same year.

After Albert Libertad's death, Morand succeeded him at the anarchist newspaper L'Anarchie and managed its operations alongside Armandine Mahé, the sister of Anna Mahé. However, following her arrest for participating in a protest against Georges Clemenceau—motivated by his decision to erect a monument honoring Charles Floquet, a politician implicated in the Panama scandals—she was no longer able to manage the newspaper and was replaced by Lucien Lecourtier. In 1910, she began a relationship with Jacques Long and lived with him, earning a living by doing housework for private households. Morand maintained connections with anti-colonial circles and, in 1912, briefly had a relationship with Virendranath Chattopadhyaya, an Indian revolutionary, who moved in with her.

She then became the secretary of the Comité Féminin, one of the leading anarcha-feminist and feminist organizations of the time. This focus on feminist themes continued when she co-founded Le Cinéma du Peuple with other anarchists. This cooperative was dedicated to producing anarchist films, and she appeared to be particularly influential in shaping its feminist and anarcha-feminist direction from the outset, alongside Henriette Tilly and Lucien Descaves. This feminist initiative culminated in the production of the first feminist film in history, Les Misères de l’aiguille.

In August 1914, she traveled to Spain with Jacques Long, who had been exempted from military service. She returned in 1915 to assist anarchists seeking to avoid conscription and to carry out antimilitarist propaganda. Her two brothers fled to the United Kingdom after deserting the army.

In 1919, the couple was expelled from Spain for anarchist propaganda. In France, Morand and Long were charged by the Bordeaux prosecutor's office with the charge of 'collaborating with the enemy'. Released on provisional liberty, they fled once again, first to the Netherlands and then to Belgium. Sentenced in absentia to life imprisonment and pressured by increasingly dire financial circumstances, they returned to France. On 20 July 1921, Long committed suicide. The following year, on 10 April 1922, Morand voluntarily surrendered to the police in Mandres-les-Roses and appealed her previous conviction. Defending her conduct during the war, she declared to the court: 'Preventing the deaths of young Frenchmen is a more patriotic act than sending them to die'. Her sentence was reduced to five years of imprisonment and ten years of banishment.

Morand undertook two hunger strikes to obtain recognition as a political prisoner, receiving widespread support that extended beyond anarchist circles. During her imprisonment, she clashed with certain members of Le Libertaire, accusing them of sectarianism for their lack of support for communist political prisoners.

On 29 August 1924, she was pardoned and retired to Mandres-les-Roses, where her mother lived. Although she maintained connections with the anarchist movement, notably with E. Armand, she ceased active participation. By 1927, she was no longer under police surveillance as an anarchist.

In 1932, she began exhibiting signs of mental disorders, such as paranoid delusions, and spent the remainder of her life in dire circumstances, moving between various care institutions. She died on 26 February 1969, in Fitz-James, in the Oise department.
