= List of French films of 1917 =

A list of films produced in France in 1917.

Title	Director	Cast	Genre	Notes
48, avenue de l'Opéra	Bernard-Deschamps, Georges Denola	Harry Baur, Jean Worms, Henri Bosc, Jacques Grétillat	Drama	
Aimer c'est souffrir				
L'Alsace attendait...	Henri Desfontaines			
Anana antiféministe		Renee Sylvaire, Félix Léonnec		
Anana cherche un complet				
Angoisse	André Hugon	Paul Guidé, Albert Dieudonné		
Anguish	André Hugon	Paul Guidé, Albert Dieudonné	Silent	
The Jackals	André Hugon	Andre Nox, Musidora	Adventure	
Sharks	André Hugon	Charles Krauss, Andre Nox	Crime	
The Torture of Silence	Abel Gance	Emmy Lynn, Firmin Gemier	Drama	

== See also ==
- 1917 in France
