= List of French films of 1919 =

A list of films produced in France in 1919.

Title	Director	Cast	Genre	Notes
Appassionatamente		Suzy Prim, Alberto Pasquali, Fede Sedino, Giulio Andreotti		With Italy
L'Appel de la sang	Louis Mercanton	Gabriel de Gravone, Charles le Bargy, Desdemona Mazza, Phyllis Neilson-Terry, Ivor Novello		Based on novel by Robert Hichens
L'Argent qui tue	Georges Denola	Germaine De France, Juliette Clarens	Comedy	
Barrabas				
Le Bercail	Marcel L'Herbier	Marcelle Pradot, Jacques Catelain	Drama	
Le bonheur des autres				
A Crime Has Been Committed	André Hugon			
Haceldama ou Le prix du sang	Julien Duvivier	Severin-Mars, Camille Bert	Drama	
J'accuse	Abel Gance	Romuald Joubé	drama	Pathé Frères
Mademoiselle Chiffon	André Hugon	Musidora, Suzanne Munte		

== See also ==
- 1919 in France
