= Comité féminin =

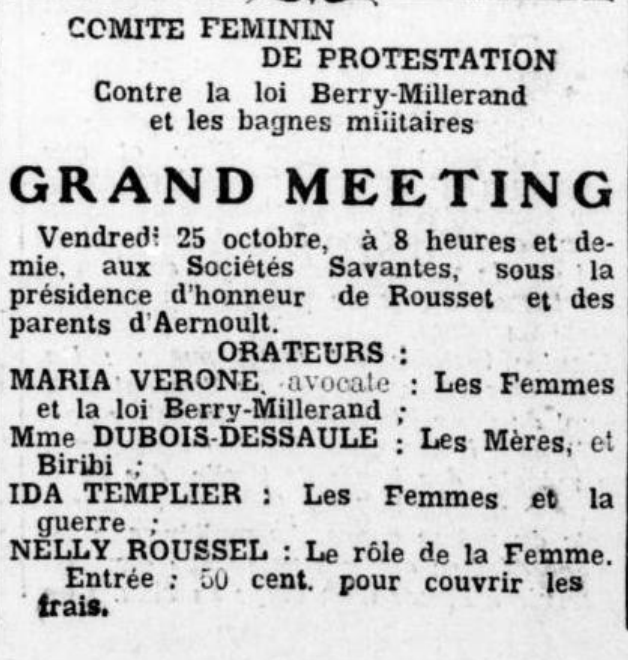
- Program of a meeting by the Comité féminin in Le Libertaire (26 October 1912)
- Formation: 31 August 1912; 113 years ago
- Purpose: Propagating anarchism and feminism
- Key people: Henriette Tilly, Jane Morand, Thérèse Taugourdeau

The Comité féminin, or in its full name, the Comité féminin contre la loi Berry-Millerand, les bagnes militaires et toutes les iniquités sociales (English: Women's committee against the Berry-Millerand law, military penal colonies and all social iniquities), was a French anarcha-feminist, anarcho-communist, anticolonial, antimilitarist, and anarcho-syndicalist organization founded on 31 August 1912 by anarchist activists from the Parisian seamstresses' union, such as Henriette Tilly, Jane Morand, and Thérèse Taugourdeau.

Fighting against the deportation of prisoners to the colonies and for women's and female workers' rights, the organization quickly became the most significant of its kind in Paris. More broadly, it served as a platform for disseminating feminist ideas within French society and, more specifically, among anarchist circles in France. In this capacity, several activists from the Comité féminin influenced and participated in the anarchist cooperative Le Cinéma du Peuple, pushing it toward the production of Les Misères de l'Aiguille, likely the first feminist film in history.

== History ==
The organization was founded on 31 August 1912 in response to the Berry-Millerand law, which allowed incarcerated individuals to be sent to colonial troops to serve their sentences. Military penal colonies were also a key issue leading to the group's formation. The activists behind the Comité féminin came primarily from anarchist and revolutionary socialist circles in the Île-de-France region, particularly from the seamstresses' union. Thérèse Taugourdeau became its first secretary, while Clémence Jusselin served as its first treasurer, and the group's initial meetings were held at the Paris Bourse du Travail during the seamstresses' union’s office hours.

The activists quickly became involved in propaganda efforts, writing and distributing several leaflets with titles such as 'Women, Let’s Revolt!', 'Call to the mothers, sisters, and companions of the concerned', 'Call to Women', and 'Young conscripts, listen to our appeals!'. They also created posters, which they put up on the walls of Paris. In one of these posters, titled “Woman! Do you want to?', they wrote:

Come and show that if the rulers dare to take yours, you have the strength to rise up and that you will not hesitate to use any means necessary to achieve justice.
Woman! It is your turn… The floor is yours!…

On 8 October 1912, Taugourdeau and Berthe Lemaître were arrested while distributing leaflets at the Gare de l'Est. However, this did not prevent the activists from holding an important meeting at the salle des Sociétés Savantes on 25 October 1912. Taugourdeau continued to give speeches the following year, speaking on behalf of the Comité féminin before an audience of 1,200, alongside Charles-Ange Laisant.

During their demonstration on 1 May 1913, several members were arrested by the police. On 25 May 1913, the Comité féminin participated in a pacifist gathering at Pré-Saint-Gervais. Around this time, Taugourdeau was replaced as secretary by Jane Morand, an individualist anarchist and former editor-in-chief of the newspaper L'Anarchie. By 1913, the Comité féminin was regarded as one of the most important feminist organizations in Paris.

Two members of the committee, Jane Morand and Henriette Tilly, joined the anarchist cooperative Le Cinéma du Peuple at its inception and influenced it to produce Les Misères de l'aiguille (1914), likely the first feminist film in history. Morand also became actively involved in numerous speeches and wrote extensively on antimilitarist issues in the anarchist press during this period.

== Bibliography ==
* Mundim, Luiz Felipe Cezar (2017), "Les Misères de l'Aiguille of the cooperative Cinéma du Peuple in France: a feminist experience in the early cinema", 11th Seminar on the Origins and History of Cinema, vol. Presences and Representations of Women in the Early Years of Cinema 1895-1920
