= Les Misères de l'aiguille =

- Directed by: Raphaël Clamour
- Starring: Musidora
- Cinematography: Armand Guerra
- Production company: Le Cinéma du Peuple
- Release date: 18 January 1914 (Paris)
- Country: France
- Language: French

Les Misères de l'aiguille or Miseries of the Needle is an anarchist and feminist film released in 1914, directed by Raphaël Clamour and produced by Le Cinéma du Peuple. Focusing on the condition of women and the situation of female workers, it is likely the first feminist film in history.

The anarchist cooperative that produced it explicitly called for the emancipation of women and encouraged the audience to become politically engaged on the issue. Furthermore, the film sought to highlight the material, moral, and social issues affecting women. Featuring Musidora in the central role, this marks her first role in a film. Published eight years before La Souriante madame Beudet by Germaine Dulac, the film was later rediscovered by historians and restored in 2020 by the Cinémathèque.

== Synopsis ==
Surviving footage from Les Misères de l'aiguille (nearly all the movie)

The film, which lasts 13 minutes, portrays Louise, a seamstress, and the exploitation of seamstresses during that period. In the story, Louise is presented as a worker who defies the traditional role assigned to women of her time. She rejects her boss, who tries to assault her sexually, and slaps him. Driven to the brink of suicide, she takes her child to the edge of a river, ready to jump, but holds back at the last moment. The film's epilogue features The Internationale and a call to the workers to organize in defense of their interests.

== History ==
=== Context ===
The anarchists in France sought to engage with cinema, an invention with strong potential for propaganda and the transmission of ideas. A group formed within their ranks, which also included revolutionary syndicalists, an ideologically similar movement, and this group founded Le Cinéma du Peuple in October 1913. This cooperative film production company was the first left-wing militant organization to seize the means of film production. The decision to make a feminist film as their first production gradually became evident, largely due to the influence of Lucien Descaves, former vice president of the Ligue Française pour le Droit des Femmes. Additionally, Henriette Tilly, president of the Comité féminin, the most important anarcha-feminist association in Paris at the time, and Jane Morand, an individualist anarchist, strongly encouraged the cooperative to focus on feminist themes from the outset.

=== Shooting ===
Quickly, the cooperative began working on its first film, Les Misères de l'aiguille. It was directed by Raphaël Clamour, with Armand Guerra in charge of the cinematography. The lead actress was Musidora, whom Clamour knew through his connections in the French artistic and theatrical circles. This allowed him to approach her and invite her to play the main role of the film, that of Louise, a seamstress in a Parisian clothing store. It was the first film in which she acted.

=== Release ===
After the end of filming, the film was released. It was published on 18 January 1914. Its feminist ambition was clear, as Lucien Descaves wrote in the program accompanying the film:

Whatever is said, women in today's society find themselves in a situation far inferior to that of men. It has been rightly said that women are doubly exploited: exploited as producers and often exploited in their homes. [...] If all 'Louises' agree to reflect on their unfortunate fate, they will escape their mortal isolation; they will unite in organizations of defense. If all the [male] militants who wish to liberate women support us, the cause of female emancipation will have made great strides, and the 'Cinéma du Peuple' will not regret the effort it has made to produce Les Misères de l'Aiguille.

=== After ===
The film was ignored in the historiography of cinema for much of the 20th century, like other productions from Le Cinéma du Peuple. However, their works were rediscovered, and the film was restored in 2020 by the Cinémathèque.

== Analysis ==
In its feminist message, the film reflected on the issue of suicide by presenting Louise as hesitating to take her own life. This fit into a broader reflection aimed at "making visible the material, social, and moral censorship issues" that affected women. The choice of the name 'Louise' is a reference to Louise Michel.

The film creates a bridge between feminism and anarchist communism, encouraging women to organize in anarchist communist groups. It is thus more of an anarchist communist project than an individualist anarchist one.

== Legacy ==
Published eight years before La Souriante madame Beudet by Germaine Dulac, the film is likely the first feminist film in history.
