= Mahé (surname) =

Mahé (French pronunciation: [mae]) is a French surname. Notable people with this surname include:

- Alain Mahé (born 1946), French co-driver
- Anna Mahé (1882–1960), French anarchist activist
- André Mahé (1919–2010), French road bicycle racer
- André Mahé (writer) (1908–1982), French writer
- Armandine Mahé (1880–1968), French anarchist activist
- Célestin Etienne Mahé (1853–1933), French author
- Édouard Mahé (1905–1992), French painter
- Eric Mahé (born 1970), French motorcycle racer
- François Mahé (1930–2015), French road bicycle racer
- Gildas Mahé (born 1975), French navigator
- Henri Mahé (1907–1975), French film director
- Hervé Mahé (1909–2003), French athlete
- Hoel Mahe (born 1990), French writer
- Jacques-Louis Mahé (1912–1992), French Esperantist
- Jean Mahé (1917–1946), French military pilot
- Jean Mahé (fl. 13th century), French Catholist priest
- Joseph Mahé (1760–1831), French Catholic priest
- Joseph Mahé (cyclist) (1937–1987), French cyclist
- Jean-Michel Mahé (1776–1833), French Navy officer
- Jean-Pierre Mahé (born 1944), French orientalist
- Julien Mahé (born 1983), French basketball coach
- Kentin Mahé (born 1991), French handball player
- Marguerite-Hélène Mahé (1903–1996), French writer
- Océane Mahé (born 2002), French cyclist
- Pascal Mahé (born 1963), French handball player
- Patrick Mahé (born 1947), French journalist
- Pierre Mahé (died 1913), French stamp dealer
- Reno Mahe (born 1980), American football player
- Roland Mahé (born 1940), Canadian theatre director
- Roslynn Mahe, Australian singer and participant in season 1 of The X Factor
- Serge Mahé (1931–2012), French trade unionist
- Sela Mahe, participant in season 1 of New Zealand Idol
- Stéphane Mahé (born 1968), French footballer
- Yves Mahé (1919–1962) French lieutenant colonel
