= Armandine Mahé =

French activist

- Born: 13 October 1880; Bourgneuf-en-Retz
- Died: 28 November 1968 (aged 88); Colombes
- Spouse(s): Henry Pierre Martin

Armandine Mahé (1880–1968), was a French schoolteacher, seamstress, and activist in individualist anarchism and later anarchist communism. Alongside her sister Anna Mahé and Albert Libertad, she co-founded the journal L'Anarchie, which she managed for a time before gradually shifting away from individualist anarchism to embrace anarcho-communism.

== Biography ==
Armandine Mahé was born on 13 October 1880, in Bourgneuf-en-Retz, Loire-Atlantique. She simultaneously worked as a schoolteacher and a ladies' tailor in Nantes, according to police reports about her. Around 1903, she moved to Paris and became involved with individualist anarchist circles, particularly those surrounding the journal L'Anarchie, which she co-founded before contributing articles to it. In 1905, she may have had a child with Libertad, named Diamant.

However, she came into conflict with individualists, accusing them of neglecting social issues such as the struggle to reduce working hours. She also criticized what she perceived as a tendency to form a "scientific aristocracy". Alongside Henry-Pierre Martin, an individualist anarchist and collaborator of L'Anarchie, she opposed Anna Mahé and Albert Libertad within the journal, accusing Libertad of taking the journal's profits. After Albert Libertad's death in 1908, she took over the journal's management and advocated for it to be run collectively. She stated in the journal:

The experiment will involve active work without a director or delegate. At certain times, Libertad found himself weakened by the excessive burden placed on his shoulders. His premature death is one of the consequences. Such a situation must not happen again.

In private, she described Libertad as authoritarian and moody. At the same time, she began seeking closer ties with anarcho-communists, notably by writing to Max Nettlau and asking him to relay updates on the journal's situation to Malatesta, while inviting them to send capable and experienced individuals to contribute to its publication. She left the journal a few weeks after these attempts and was subsequently replaced by Jane Morand.

In 1909, Mahé married Henry-Pierre Martin. She wrote an anti-electoral text for the Italian anarchist movement titled Le Criminel, in which she equated voters with accomplices to the crimes committed by the state, thereby labeling them as criminals.

In 1912, during police investigations into the Bonnot Gang, Mahé and Martin's home was searched, but nothing incriminating was found. In the following years, she gradually distanced herself from individualist anarchism and embraced anarchist communism.

She died on 28 November 1968, in Colombes.
