= Worthless Woman =

1921 film

- Directed by: André Hugon
- Written by: André Hugon
- Starring: Suzanne Talba; José Durany; Vasseur
- Production company: Monat Film
- Distributed by: Rosenvaig Univers Location
- Release date: 3 June 1921
- Country: France
- Languages: Silent; French intertitles

Worthless Woman (French:Fille de rien) is a 1921 French silent film directed by André Hugon and starring Suzanne Talba, José Durany and Vasseur.

== Cast ==
- Suzanne Talba as Conchita
- José Durany as Pedro
- Vasseur as Manuel
- Maxa

== Bibliography ==
- Rège, Philippe. Encyclopedia of French Film Directors, Volume 1. Scarecrow Press, 2009.
