= Armand Guerra =

Spanish director and anarchist

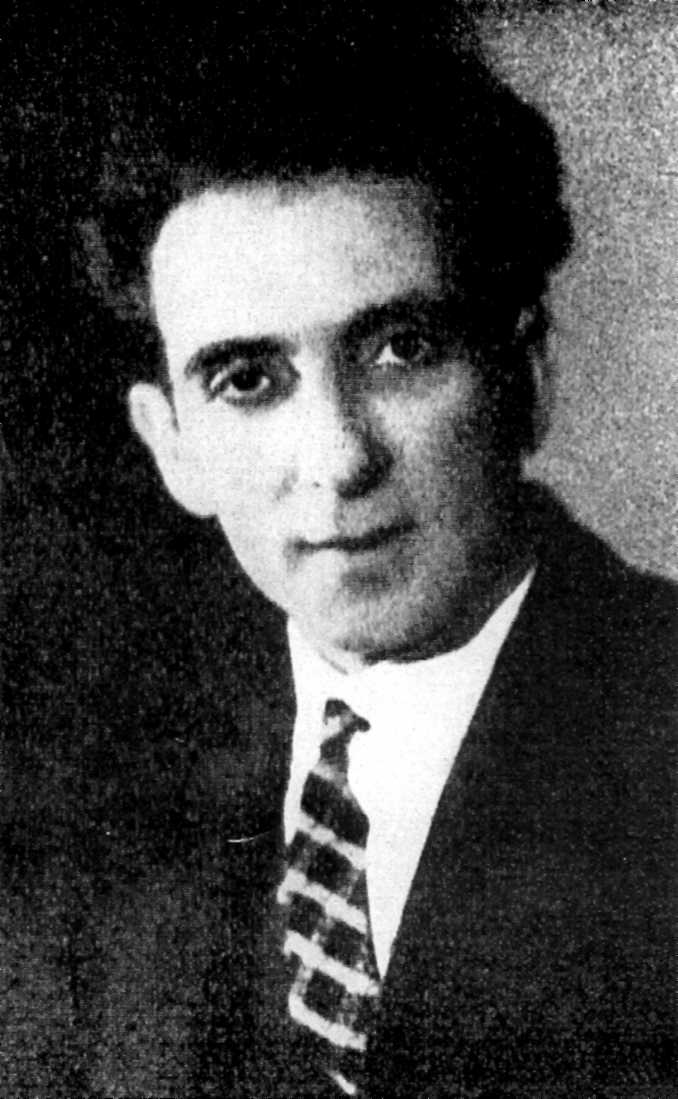
- Born: 1886; Llíria, Spain
- Died: 1939 (aged 52–53); France
- Occupation(s): Director, producer
- Known for: Carne de fieras

José María Estivalis Calvo (1886–1939), better known as Armand Guerra, was a Spanish director and anarchist. With the film cooperative Le cinéma du peuple, Guerra directed the 1913 short Les miséres de l'aiguille featuring Musidora and the first segment of the 1914 Lucien Descaves's La commune. Guerra lived in Russia during the October Revolution and Germany during the Weimar Republic, where he was a producer, screenwriter, and writer of Spanish subtitles. His feature film debut was the 1926 Luis Candelas o el bandido de Madrid. He started a production company in Berlin, which released Der Kampf un der Mann in 1927. He moved to Spain and was unsuccessful in starting a film production studio. In conjunction with the Confederación Nacional del Trabajo, he began to film Carne de fieras in July 1936 but was interrupted by the Spanish Civil War. The film was later finished in 1992. During the war, he produced several documentaries. As communists came to dominate the anarchists in Spain, he moved his wife and daughter to France, where he worked on solidarity campaigns for the Spanish Republicans. Upon returning to Spain, Guerra was captured. Though he escaped to Paris in February 1939, he soon died thereafter.

== Bibliography ==
- Mannoni, Laurent (1995). "La Commune". In Bénoliel, Bernard (ed.). La persistance des images: tirages, sauvegardes et restaurations dans la collection films de la Cinémathèque Française (in French). Paris: Cinémathèque française. pp. 44–47. ISBN 978-2-900596-17-3. OCLC 799447677.
- Torres, Augusto M. (2004). "Armand Guerra". Directores españoles malditos. Madrid: Huerga y Fierro Editores. pp. 169–. ISBN 978-84-8374-480-2.
