= Vertige =

Vertige may refer to:

- Vertigo, a 1917 French film,
- Vertige (1969 film), a 1969 Canadian documentary film,
- High Lane, a 2009 French drama film,
- Vertige (TV series), a 2012 Canadian drama television miniseries,
- Vertige Graphic, a French publisher of comic books and graphic novels.
