= The Fugitive (1920 film) =

1920 film

- Directed by: André Hugon
- Starring: Marie-Louise Derval; André Nox; Armand Numès
- Production company: Les Films Succès
- Release date: 1920
- Country: France
- Languages: Silent; French intertitles

The Fugitive (French: La Fugitive) is a 1920 French silent film directed by André Hugon and starring Marie-Louise Derval, André Nox and Armand Numès.

== Cast ==
- Marie-Louise Derval
- André Nox
- Armand Numès
- Jane Renouardt
- Pierre Denols
- Adrienne Duriez

== Bibliography ==
- Rège, Philippe. Encyclopedia of French Film Directors, Volume 1. Scarecrow Press, 2009.
