= The Criminal (1926 film) =

1926 film directed by Alexandre Ryder

- Directed by: Alexandre Ryder
- Written by: Andrée Cortis (novel)
- Starring: Teresina Boronat; André Nox; Roger San Juana
- Cinematography: Geo Blanc
- Production company: Majestic Films
- Release date: 12 November 1926
- Country: France
- Languages: Silent; French intertitles

The Criminal (French: Le criminel) is a 1926 French silent drama film directed by Alexandre Ryder and starring Teresina Boronat, André Nox and Roger San Juana.

== Cast ==
- Teresina Boronat as Mercédès
- André Nox as Don Joaquim
- Roger San Juana as Roselito
- Madeleine Barjac as Isabelle
- Jean Lorette as Pablo
- Pâquerette as Sérafina

== Bibliography ==
- Rège, Philippe. Encyclopedia of French Film Directors, Volume 1. Scarecrow Press, 2009.
