= André Nox =

French actor (1869–1946)

- Born: Abraham André Nonnes-Lopes; 14 November 1869; Paris, France
- Died: 25 February 1946 (aged 76); Fouesnant, France
- Other name: André Nonnez
- Occupation: Actor
- Years active: 1916–1940 (film)

André Nox (1869–1946) was a French film actor.

== Selected filmography ==
- The Jackals (1917)
- Vertigo (1917)
- Sharks (1917)
- The Fugitive (1920)
- Lord Arthur Savile's Crime (1922)
- After Love (1924)
- Count Kostia (1925)
- The Nude Woman (1926)
- The Criminal (1926)
- The Merry Farmer (1927)
- Little Devil May Care (1928)
- Ship in Distress (1929)
- Ecstasy (1933)
- The Tunnel (1933)
- Cease Firing (1934)
- The Call of Silence (1936)
- Nights of Fire (1937)
- Beethoven's Great Love (1937)
- Sisters in Arms (1937)
- The Citadel of Silence (1937)
- White Nights in Saint Petersburg (1938)
- J'accuse! (1938)
- Ultimatum (1938)
- Case of Conscience (1939)

== Bibliography ==
- Goble, Alan. The Complete Index to Literary Sources in Film. Walter de Gruyter, 1999.
