= Alexandre Ryder =

Polish-born French film director

- Born: 13 August 1891; Będzin, Poland
- Died: 25 August 1966 (aged 75); Saint-Germain-en-Laye, France
- Occupations: Film director, screenwriter
- Years active: 1920—1950

Alexandre Ryder (1891–1966) was a Polish-born French film director best known for his crime drama films of the 1920s and 1930s.

He directed some 20 films between 1920 and 1950.

His 1940 film Après Mein Kampf mes crimes (My Crimes after Mein Kampf) was a propaganda film directed against Nazi Germany and Adolf Hitler's policies. Germany had invaded Poland, Ryder's homeland, a year earlier in 1939.

== Selected filmography ==
- The Woman with Closed Eyes (1926)
- The Criminal (1926)
- Buridan's Donkey (1932)
- Mirages (1938)
