= A Crime Has Been Committed =

- Directed by: André Hugon
- Release date: 1919
- Country: France
- Languages: Silent; French intertitles

A Crime Has Been Committed (French:Un crime a été commis) is a 1919 French silent film directed by André Hugon.

== Bibliography ==
- Dayna Oscherwitz & MaryEllen Higgins. The A to Z of French Cinema. Scarecrow Press, 2009.
