= Sharks (film) =

- Directed by: André Hugon
- Starring: Charles Krauss; Marcel Bérard; André Nox
- Release date: 9 November 1917
- Country: France
- Languages: Silent; French intertitles

Sharks (French:Requins) is a 1917 French silent crime film directed by André Hugon and starring Charles Krauss, Marcel Bérard and André Nox.

== Cast ==
- Charles Krauss
- Marcel Bérard
- André Nox
- Jean Signoret
- Maryse Dauvray
- Marie-Louise Derval

== Bibliography ==
- Rège, Philippe. Encyclopedia of French Film Directors, Volume 1. Scarecrow Press, 2009.
