= Anguish (1917 film) =

- Directed by: André Hugon
- Written by: Albert Dieudonné André Hugon
- Starring: Paul Guidé; Albert Dieudonné; Marie-Louise Derval
- Release date: 1917
- Country: France
- Languages: Silent; French intertitles

Anguish (French:Angoisse) is a 1917 French silent film directed by André Hugon and starring Paul Guidé, Albert Dieudonné and Marie-Louise Derval.

== Cast ==
- Paul Guidé as Jacques de Lucigny
- Albert Dieudonné as Guy de Rouvres
- Marie-Louise Derval as Jacqueline de Rouvres

== Bibliography ==
- Dayna Oscherwitz & MaryEllen Higgins. The A to Z of French Cinema. Scarecrow Press, 2009.
