= Vertigo (1917 film) =

- Directed by: André Hugon
- Written by: André Nox
- Starring: Régine Marco; André Nox; Marie-Louise Derval
- Production company: Les Films Succès
- Release date: 7 September 1917
- Country: France
- Languages: Silent; French intertitles

Vertigo (French:Vertige) is a 1917 French silent film directed by André Hugon and starring Régine Marco, André Nox, Marie-Louise Derval.

== Cast ==
- Régine Marco as La Princesse Vadioff
- André Nox as Pierre Daler
- Marie-Louise Derval as Suzanne
- Léon Bernard as Le peintre Tissière
- Maggy Delval
- Ridd

== Bibliography ==
- Rège, Philippe. Encyclopedia of French Film Directors, Volume 1. Scarecrow Press, 2009.
