= Paul Guidé =

French actor

- Born: 18 March 1884; Paris, France
- Died: October 16, 1940 (aged 56); Paris, France
- Other name: Paul François Anne Guidé
- Occupation: Actor
- Years active: 1911-1930 (film)

Paul Guidé (March 18, 1884 – October 16, 1940) was a French film actor of the silent era. Guidé appeared in more than sixty films before 1930 including La dame de Monsoreau (1913) in which he played Henry III of France.

== Filmography ==
Year	Title	Role	Notes
1912	Zigomar contre Nick Carter		
1912	Les Amours de la reine Élisabeth	Shakespeare	
1913	Zigomar, peau d'anguille	L'inspecteur	Episode: 1
1913	La rose du radjah		
1913	La dame de Monsoreau	Henri III	
1913	L'aiglon		
1914	Trompe-la-Mort	Lucien de Rubempre	
1914	The Thumb Print	Le Marquis Primo	
1915	Sadounah		
1917	L'imprévu	Jacques d'Amblize	
1917	Maryse		
1917	Le lotus d'or	Ramsey	
1917	Le devoir	Le docteur Pierre Roland	
1917	L'orage		
1917	Anguish	Jacques de Lucigny	
1918	Renoncement		
1920	Quand on aime	Maxime Quevilly	
1921	Tout se paie	Jacques Nersac	
1921	Gigolette		
1921	L'inconnue		
1922	The Mysteries of Paris	Le marquis d'Harville	
1922	Destinée		
1923	La brèche d'enfer	Jacques de Pont-Hébert	
1923	Un coquin	Paul Miriel	
1924	Mandrin	Bouret d'Erigny	
1924	L'aventurier	Jacques Guéroy	
1924	The Man Without Nerves	Hector Marcel	
1924	The Two Boys	Saint-Hyriex	
1925	Swifter Than Death	Le duc de Frontignac	
1925	Fanfan la Tulipe	Chevalier de Lurbeck	
1925	Les Misérables	Enjolras	
1927	The Loves of Casanova	Gregori Orloff	
1927	Antoinette Sabrier	Roger Dangenne	
1927	Princess Masha	Colonel Goubiesky	
1928	L'occident	Le commandant Linières	
1928	Prince Jean	Robert d'Arnheim	
1929	The Wedding March		
1930	Toute sa vie	Mr. Asmore	(final film role)

== Bibliography ==
- Waldman, Harry. Maurice Tourneur: The Life and Films. McFarland, 2001.
