= The Jackals (1917 film) =

- Directed by: André Hugon
- Written by: Arnold Day (novel); Albert Dieudonné; André Hugon; Armand du Plessy
- Starring: André Nox; Louis Paglieri; Musidora
- Cinematography: Karémine Mérobian
- Release date: 1917
- Country: France
- Languages: Silent; French intertitles

The Jackals (French: Les chacals) is a 1917 French silent adventure film directed by André Hugon and starring André Nox, Louis Paglieri and Musidora.

== Cast ==
- André Nox as Gervisi
- Louis Paglieri as Higgins
- Musidora as Dolorès Melrose
- M. Byon as James Hampton
- Marc Gérard as Benedictus
- René Carrère as Goldoya
- Maggy Delval

== Bibliography ==
- Rège, Philippe. Encyclopedia of French Film Directors, Volume 1. Scarecrow Press, 2009.
