= Fitz-James =

- Commune
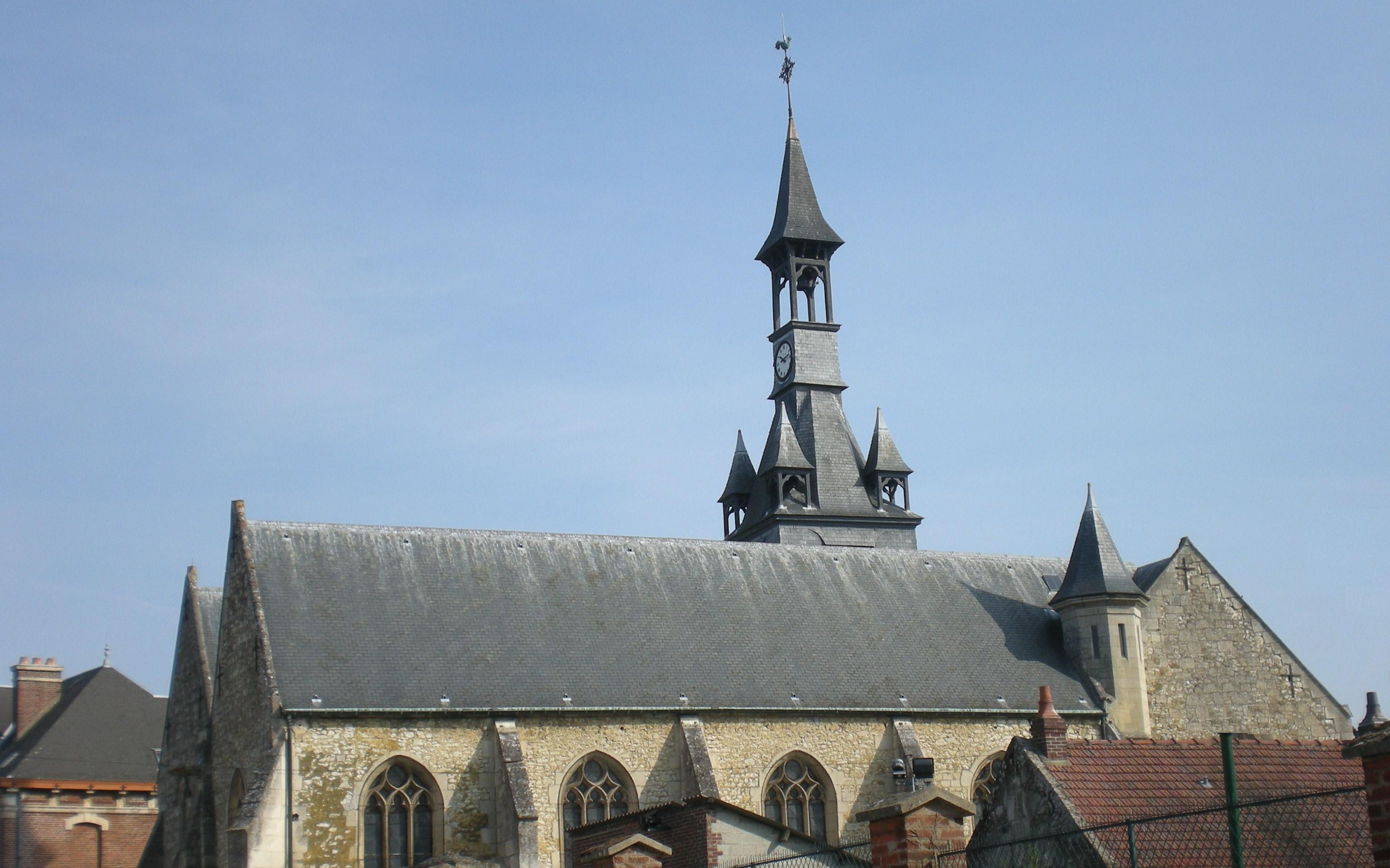
- The church in Fitz-James

- Coat of arms
- Location of Fitz-James
- Location within France Location within Hauts-de-France
- Coordinates: 49°23′28″N 2°25′51″E
- Country: France
- Region: Hauts-de-France
- Department: Oise
- Arrondissement: Clermont
- Canton: Clermont
- Intercommunality: Clermontois

Government
  - Mayor (2020–2026): Jean-Claude Pellerin
- Area^{1}: 9.65 km^{2} (3.73 sq mi)
- Elevation: 70 m (230 ft)
- Highest elevation: 113 m (371 ft)
- Lowest elevation: 47 m (154 ft)
- Population (2023): 2,514
  - Density: 261/km^{2} (675/sq mi)
- Time zone: UTC+01:00 (CET)
  - Summer (DST): UTC+02:00 (CEST)
- INSEE/Postal code: 60234 /60600
- ^{1} French Land Register data, which excludes lakes, ponds, glaciers > 1 km^{2} (0.386 sq mi or 247 acres) and river estuaries.

Fitz-James is a commune in the Oise department in northern France. The town is named after James FitzJames, 1st Duke of Berwick.

== Population ==
Historical population
Year	Pop.	±% p.a.
1968	1,966	—
1975	2,316	+2.37%
1982	2,470	+0.92%
1990	2,428	−0.21%
1999	2,421	−0.03%
2007	2,450	+0.15%
2012	2,349	−0.84%
2017	2,515	+1.38%
2023	2,514	−0.01%
Source: INSEE

== See also ==
- Communes of the Oise department
