= Mademoiselle Chiffon =

- Directed by: André Hugon
- Written by: André Hugon
- Starring: Musidora; Suzanne Munte; Kitty Hott
- Production company: Films André Hugon
- Release date: 28 March 1919
- Country: France
- Languages: Silent; French intertitles

Mademoiselle Chiffon is a 1919 French silent film directed by André Hugon and starring Musidora as Chiffon, a Parisian milliner. Suzanne Munte and Kitty Hott co-starred in the film.

== Cast ==
- Musidora as Chiffon
- Suzanne Munte as Mademoiselle Dubois
- Kitty Hott
- René Lorsay

== Bibliography ==
- Rège, Philippe. Encyclopedia of French Film Directors, Volume 1. Scarecrow Press, 2009.
