= Musidora =

French actress (1889–1957)

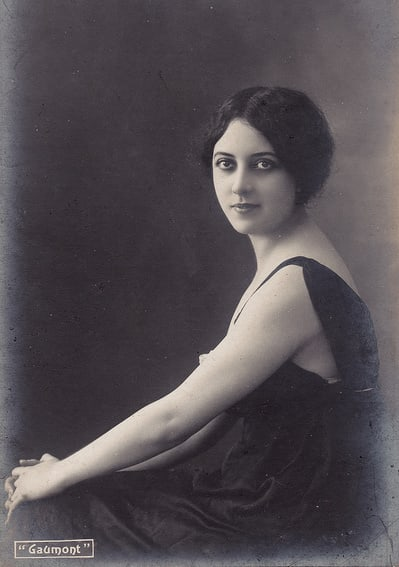
- Musidora in 1916
- Born: Jeanne Roques; 23 February 1889; Paris, France
- Died: 11 December 1957 (aged 68); Paris, France
- Burial place: Cemetery of Bois-le-Roi, Seine-et-Marne
- Occupations: Actress, film director, producer, screenwriter, novelist, songwriter, poet, memoirist, essayist
- Years active: 1909–1950
- Spouse: Dr. Clément Marot (m. 1927; div. 1944)
- Children: 1

Jeanne Roques (23 February 1889 – 11 December 1957), known professionally as Musidora, was a French actress, film director, screenwriter, playwright and novelist. A major figure of French silent cinema, she became internationally known for portraying Irma Vep in Louis Feuillade's serial Les Vampires (1915–1916), and Diana Monti in Judex (1917).

Musidora was one of the earliest "vamps" in cinema, and was later embraced by surrealist writers and filmmakers as a cultural icon. She was also among the first women to direct films, also screenwriting and producing several features in the 1910s and 1920s.

== Life and career ==
=== Early life ===
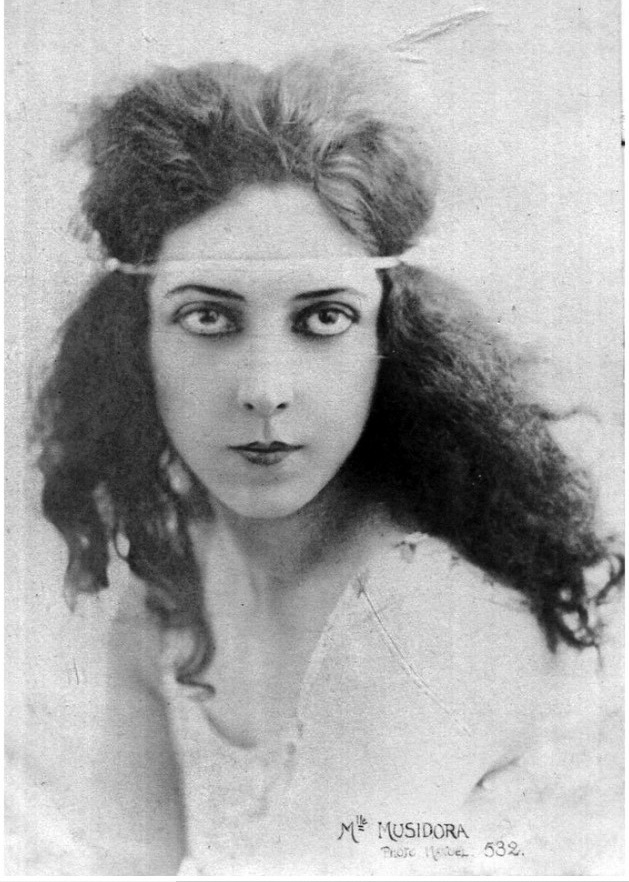
Musidora, photographed by Henri Manuel in 1910

Jeanne Roques was born in Paris to the music composer and theorist of socialism Jacques Roques (1852–1931) and the painter and feminist Adèle Clémence Porchez (1855–1928), who instilled in her a love of literature. Her paternal grandmother was of Spanish descent. She began her career at an early age, encouraged by her mother. She wrote her first novel at the age of fifteen, she painted and sculpted, attending Emmanuel Frémiet's school for three years.

Jeanne adopted the stage name "Musidora" (Greek for "gift of the muses"), after the heroine in Théophile Gautier's novel Fortunio, and began performing in cabarets, music halls, revues and plays in Paris in 1910, gaining recognition in Aristide Bruant's play La Loupiotte, where she played the part of La Môme Liquette (The Shirt Chick). Her first success was two years later at the Bataclan theatre, in the revue Ça grise, where she shared the stage with Colette, who became a lifelong friend. Musidora also performed in cabarets and on the stages of the l'Odéon and Châtelet theatres, and appeared in revues at the Folies Bergère and Bataclan theatre from 1912 to 1914, singing, dancing (especially tango), comic acting, sometimes cross-dressing.

After a few appearances in short films, almost all of which have been lost, she made her film debut in Les Misères de l'aiguille (Miseries of the Needle) (1914), a feminist social drama produced by the socialist film collective Le Cinéma du Peuple and directed by Raphaël Clamour, one of her colleagues at the Théâtre du Châtelet. The film tells the story of a seamstress who, after the death of her husband, attempts suicide with her child to escape poverty. The film highlights the problems of urban women of the French working-class.

After signing a contract with Gaumont, she appeared in a handful of films for Gaston Ravel in 1914. The film director Louis Feuillade had seen her perform as a tango dancer in La Revue Galante at the Folies Bergère and they began a professional collaboration, with her first major roles coming in his adaptation of François Coppée's play Severo Torelli, and in Le Calvaire. She was then one of the many actresses Feuillade employed in patriotic productions and vaudevilles. She also made several films with Gaumont's in-house directors, who were all pulled from their work by war mobilisation. Historical dramas, slapstick comedies, patriotic films, and sentimental scenes followed one another from 1914 to 1917.

=== Stardom – Les Vampires and Judex ===
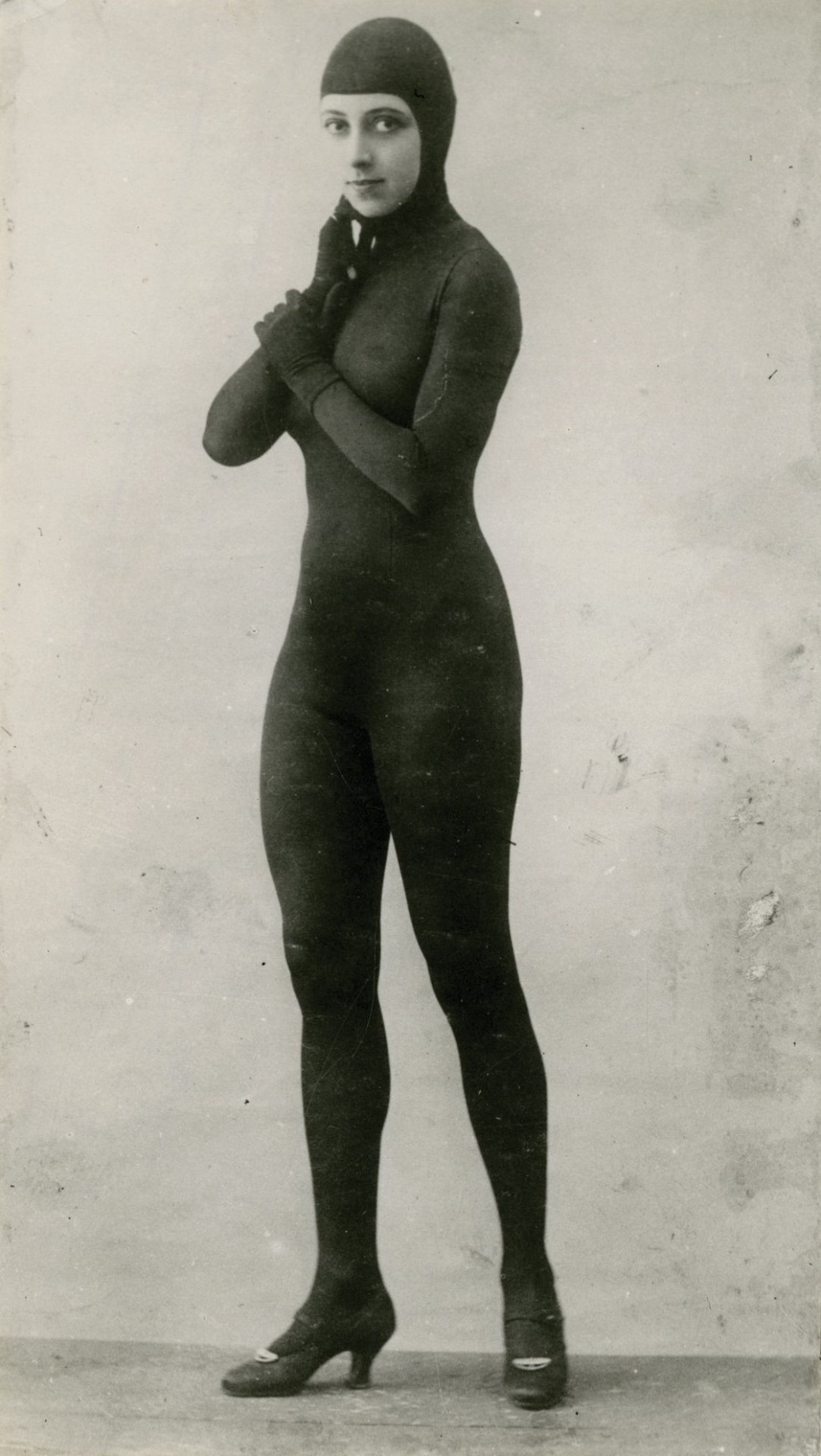
Publicity photo of Musidora as Irma Vep, dressed for burgling in her black bodysuit. She performed in cabarets and music halls alongside her film work, and wore the bodysuit and reprised the role several times.

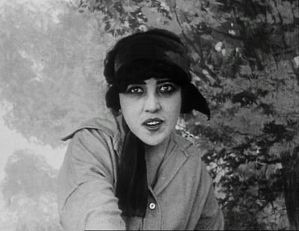
Irma Vep (Musidora) sings in the "Howling Cat" nightclub, in Les Vampires (1916).

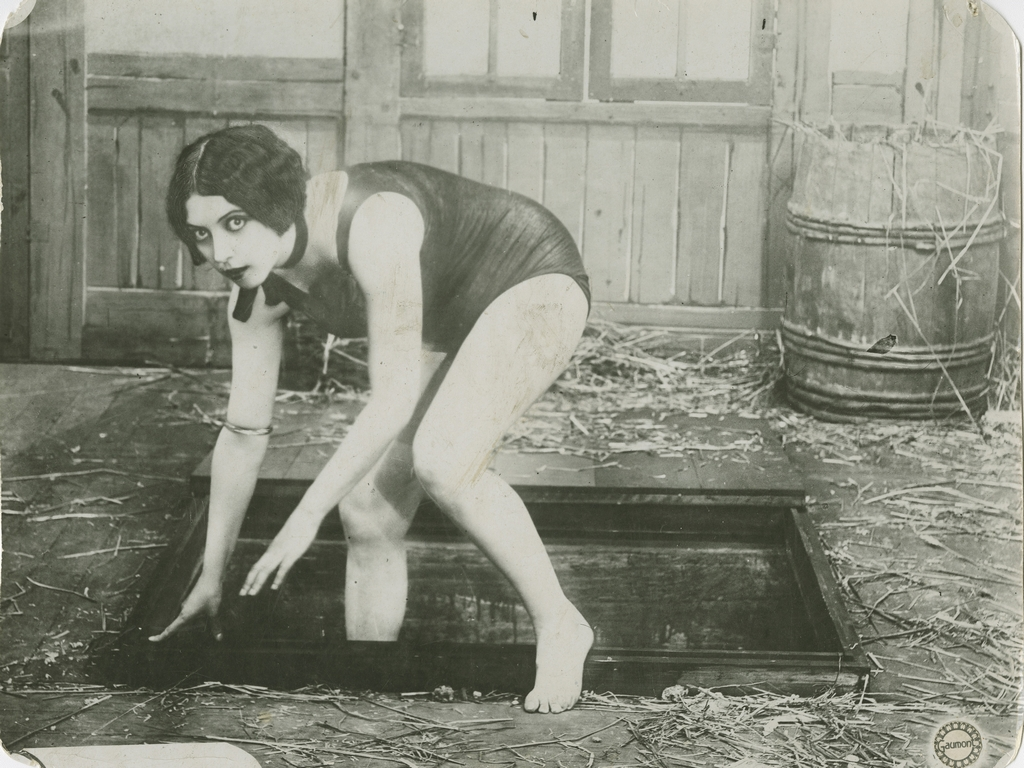
Diana Monti (Musidora) makes a daring escape, wearing a bathing suit, in Judex (1916).

In late 1915, having returned to civilian life, Louis Feuillade offered her the role of Irma Vep (an anagram of "vampire"), a cabaret singer, in Les Vampires (The Vampires). (The serial was not about vampires, but about a criminal secret society, inspired by the exploits of the real-life Bonnot Gang.) Irma Vep plays a leading role in the Vampires' crimes, and is a master of disguise. In the third episode, Musidora appears dressed for burgling, clad in a tight black silken hooded bodysuit, sometimes masked. She also appears in other episodes disguised as a maid, a typist, a sailor, a viscount, and a telephone operator, and spends two episodes under the hypnotic control of Moreno, a rival criminal, who makes her his mistress and induces her to assassinate the Grand Vampire. In another episode, she escapes captivity and conceals herself under a steam train: Musidora did her own stunts, hiding beneath the moving train, dropping off and lying between the rails as it moved away.

Musidora said later, "In the stunning VAMPIRES, I introduced the most discreet luxury. The black tight bodysuit had been worn before me by Josette Andriot, but it had been made of decent cotton. The micromesh silk of my suit would for a long time set astir the youth of 1916." Her biographer, Patrick Cazals, considers the scenes in which Musidora appears in her black silken bodysuit to be among the most erotic ones in the first quarter century of cinema. In Annette Förster's analysis, "film historic and feminist accounts treat the figure of Irma Vep in the black bodysuit as an embodiment of eroticism, evil, criminality, sexual difference, ambiguity, mobility, and silent film-experience."

The series was an immediate success with French cinema-goers and ran in ten installments until 1916. As a criminal antiheroine and femme fatale, Irma Vep was an immediate sensation; the role brought Musidora international fame and established Irma Vep as an enduring figure in silent cinema. The strange character enjoyed great popular success and Musidora was admired by members of the Surrealist movement, who later made her one of their poetic emblems. Her heavily stylised appearance, with her dark eyes heavily lined with kohl, her pale skin, her dramatic makeup, and her exotic wardrobe, contributed to Musidora becoming one of the most recognisable stars of French silent cinema. Her vamp persona was popularised in the United States by actress Theda Bara at about the same time.

After the Les Vampires serial, Musidora starred as the criminal adventuress Diana Monti in Judex, another popular Feuillade serial filmed in 1916 but delayed for release until 1917. Diana Monti is even more seductive and wicked than Irma Vep. Disguised as the governess Marie Verdier, she attempts to seduce the banker Favraux, and tries throughout the series to seize his fortune.

In the fifth episode, Diana Monti escapes capture by removing her outer clothes to reveal a black bathing suit, in which she dives into water and swims away. A contemporary reviewer wrote admiringly, "Miss Musidora, who has to flee in great haste, plunges into the river in such a marvellous way, that one forgets the blackness of her soul for the moment." Judex was an even greater popular success than Les Vampires, and confirmed her position as a French film star or vedette.

By the time her contract with Gaumont expired in 1917, she had appeared in more than forty dramas and farces, and had become one of the stars of French silent film.

She subsequently acted in films directed by André Hugon: Les Chacals (The Jackals) (1917), Johannès, fils de Johannès (Johannes, Son of Johannes) (1918), and Mam'zelle Chiffon (1918); by Gaston Ravel: La Geôle (The Jail) (1918); by Germaine Dulac: La Jeune Fille la plus méritante de France (The Most Deserving Girl in France) (1918); and by Fred LeRoy Granville: Le Berceau de Dieu a.k.a. Les Ombres du passé (Shadows of the Past a.k.a. The Cradle of God) (1926). At the same time, she continued to appear on stage in revues, vaudeville, and melodramas.

=== Musidora and the Surrealists ===
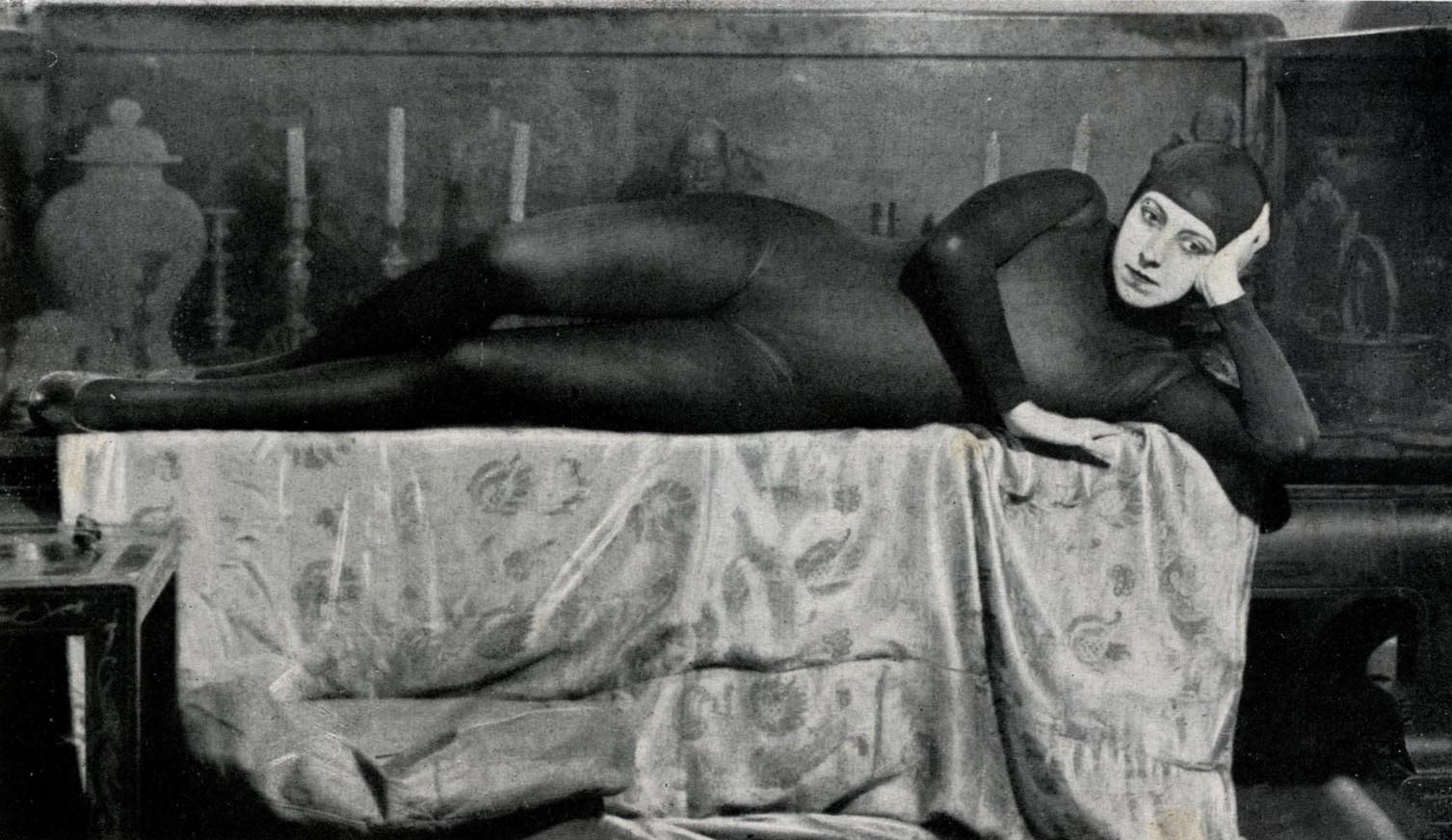
Publicity shot of Musidora wearing her iconic costume from Les Vampires.

André Breton, Louis Aragon, and the other founders of the Surrealist movement were avid viewers of Feuillade's serial films, particularly Les Vampires. Though not intended to be avant-garde, Les Vampires and Judex were lauded by Aragon and Breton in the 1920s for the films' elements of surprise, fantasy/science fiction, unexpected juxtapositions and visual non sequitors. They adopted Musidora as a cultural icon, and invited her to several of their events. (Note: Both in the 1910s and since, commentators have conflated the actress Musidora with her on-screen persona Irma Vep. For example, in the 2007 opinion of the German film scholar Thomas Brandlmeier, "Who would have guessed that a certain Musidora existed in this world, boundlessly vain, capricious, depraved, malicious as a scorpion, so wicked that one feels compelled to look beneath her dress to see if she has a devil's foot; a Musidora without soul, without pity, without regret, who even betrays the lover of her choice; a vampire of gold and silver who drinks the inheritances of sons from wealthy families like soda water to keep his appetite alive; a demonic mocker who pours his shrill and merciless laughter over everything, a depraved courtesan who revives the orgies of antiquity without the passionate ardour of a Messalina as an excuse.")

Aragon wrote:

The worldview that an entire generation forms originates in the cinema, and there is a film that summarises that, a series. An entire generation of young people falls in love with Musidora in LES VAMPIRES.

Breton sent her roses, and the actress attended a Dada evening. He wrote to her:

A few of us have often talked about you and the mediocre future that awaits the French cinema and theatre which has never known who you were. ... It is through Les Vampires that Musidora's portrait is offered, in its final touches, adorned in her tights for the union of love and death, her eye by turns dreamy, sadistic, or passionate. The myth was established through this idealised imagery. Yet beneath the hotel mouse-like swimsuit of arachnid and sublime silk, there was also a woman whom her admirers ignored. Suffering, sensitive, anxious, seeking to express in love, poetry, and struggle, a feeling of the unattainable that this elegant black armour stifled or masked ...

At the end of 1928, Aragon and Breton wrote a play in her honour, Le Trésor des Jésuites (The Jesuits' Treasure), in which all the characters' names are anagrams of "Musidora" (Mad Souri, Doramusi, etc.) The play was originally intended to be performed at the "Gala Judex", a gala organised to support the widow of actor René Cresté (who had played the title character in Judex) on 1 December 1928. The play was published in the special issue of the Belgian avant-garde review Variétés and was performed only once, in 1935, at the Nové Divadlo (New Theatre) founded by Oldřich Nový in Prague, in a production directed by Jindřich Honzl, with sets by Jindřich Štyrský.

Filmmakers Fritz Lang, Luis Buñuel, Georges Franju, Alain Resnais, and Olivier Assayas have all been influenced by Les Vampires and Judex in their careers as directors.

=== As a director and producer ===
At a time when many women in the film industry were confined to acting, Musidora achieved a degree of success as a film producer and director. She was among the earliest French women to work as a film director, screenwriter, and producer during the silent era. Following pioneers such as Alice Guy-Blaché and alongside contemporaries including Germaine Dulac, she belonged to a small group of women who exercised creative control behind the camera in early French cinema. Between 1917 and 1924, she directed or co-directed several films in France and Spain, although most are now lost. Her work has since been reassessed by feminist film historians as an important contribution to women's authorship in silent cinema.

She set up her own film production company, Société des Films Musidora, and adapted two novels by her friend Colette: L'Ingénue libertine, which became Minne (1916); and La Vagabonde (The Vagabonde) (1918), which she co-wrote (with Colette) and co-directed (with Eugenio Perego), based on Colette's novel of the same name. In Italy, she produced and directed La Flamme cachée (The Hidden Flame) (1920) based on an original screenplay by Colette, before writing and directing Vicenta (1920). Between the late 1910s and early 1920s, she directed ten films, most of which are now lost, with only two surviving: Soleil et Ombre (Sol y sombra) (Sun and Shadow) (1922), and La Terre des taureaux (La tierra de los toros) (The Land of the Bulls) (1924), both of which were filmed in Spain.

=== Years in Spain ===
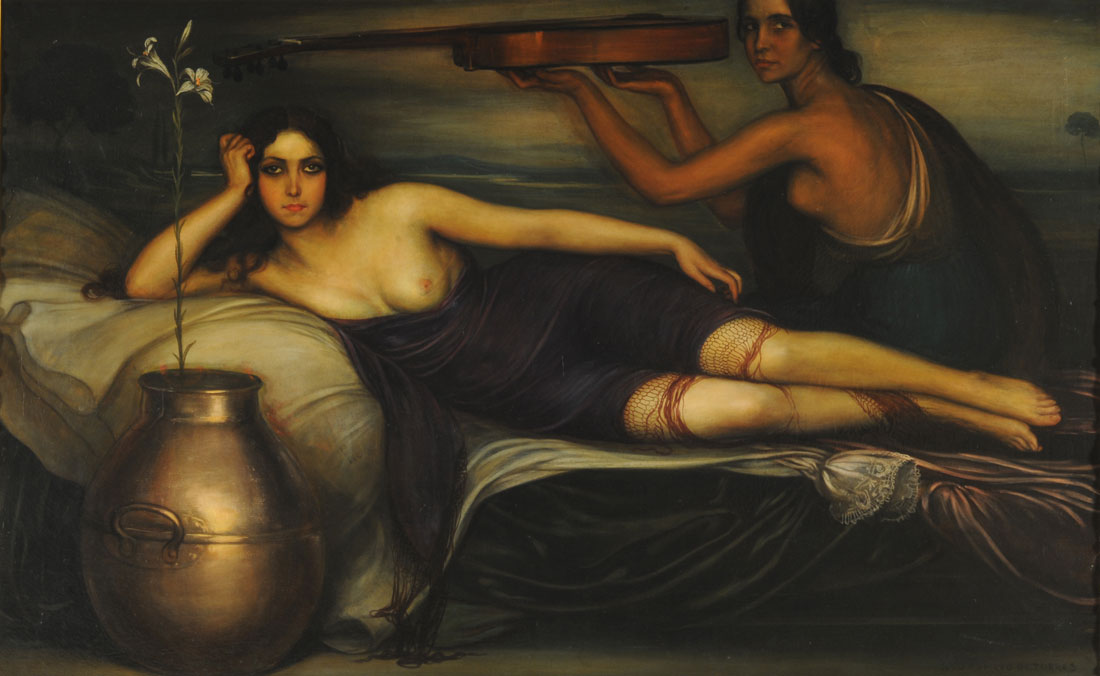
Portrait of Musidora by Julio Romero de Torres (1922). Painted in Spain, now in the collection of the Museo Nacional de Bellas Artes (Buenos Aires).

Musidora went to Spain in 1921 with a three-month contract to perform at the Teatro de la Comedia in Madrid. Through the mediation of the cuplé singer Raquel Meller, wife of the Guatemalan writer Enrique Gómez Carrillo, Musidora met the Cordoban painter Julio Romero de Torres, who portrayed her in more than one painting that same year. In Romero de Torres's circle she met the bullfighter (rejoneador) Antonio Cañero, a wealthy landowner from Córdoba, with whom she had a romantic relationship, which ended after a few months when he left her for a Russian princess.

In Spain, she wrote, directed, produced, and starred in four films, with limited success: Pour don Carlos (For Don Carlos) (1921), adapted from the eponymous novel by Pierre Benoit, which recounts the 1873–1876 guerilla campaign during the Third Carlist War;Musidora en Espagne (Musidora in Spain) (1922); Soleil et Ombre (Sun and Shadow) (1922); and La Terre des taureaux (La tierra de los toros) (The Land of the Bulls) (1924), which was conceived as part of a mixture of film screening and live performance, in which Musidora herself would sing and dance. Cañero was also to appear on stage, but he had left her by the time the film was exhibited in Spain.

Her films were well received by the press, yet she probably lost money making them.

=== Return to France ===
In 1924, Musidora ended her career as a filmmaker and turned to theatre and writing. After spending five years in Spain, she returned to Paris in 1926, and made her final film appearance in the religious epic Le Berceau de Dieu (The Cradle of God) alongside Léon Mathot, France Dhélia, and Lucien Dalsace. In the same year, she was elected Reine du Cinéma (Queen of Cinema).

After her marriage in 1927, she distanced herself from film and devoted herself primarily to the theatre until the early 1950s. In 1930, she was part of the production of Gustave Damien's touring play, Échec à la Reine (Checkmate to the Queen), in Dinard.

She sculpted, and also published two novels, Arabella et Arlequin (Arabella and Harlequin) (1928) and Paroxysmes (Paroxysms) (1934), as well as numerous songs and a collection of poems, Halos (1940). According to her biographer, Francis Lacassin, Musidora left behind many unpublished works at her death. She also taught diction at the Reims Conservatory in 1938. As well as her relationships with Breton, Aragon and Colette, she was friends with other French cultural figures, including Germaine Dulac and Pierre Louÿs. She continued to appear in plays she had written (about thirty between 1916 and 1952) until 1948, including La Vie sentimentale de George Sand (The Sentimental Life of George Sand) (1946), and was a successful songwriter, novelist, poet, memoirist, and essayist.

=== Later writing and archival work ===
After the Second World War, she became involved in the film industry again. From 1944, the year of her divorce, she worked with Henri Langlois at the Cinémathèque Française on an oral history project for the Commission for Historical Research of the Cinémathèque, coordinating, conducting and transcribing interviews with her colleagues from silent cinema. Her work for this commission inspired her to direct and star in one last film, La Magique Image (The Magic Image) (1950), an homage to Feuillade. Her last public appearance was at the Cinémathèque's permanent exhibition in 1946, where she greeted visitors reclining on a bench, wearing the black vamp bodysuit that had made her famous. Late in her life, she would occasionally work in the ticket booth of the Cinémathèque Française, where patrons might not have realised that the older woman in the foyer was starring in the film they were watching. She also worked as a journalist, writing many articles on cinema.

=== Death ===
Musidora died in Paris on 11 December 1957 at the Broussais Hospital in Paris. (Note: Förster (2017) gives her death date as 10 December, and the location as Bois-le-Roi hospital.) She was buried next to her parents in Bois-le-Roi, Seine-et-Marne, where her son practised as a dentist.

== Personal life ==
Musidora married Clément Marot (Note: Not to be confused with the poet Clément Marot.) (1895–1975), a medical doctor and childhood friend, on 20 April 1927 in Châtillon-sur-Marne. A condition of their marriage was that she could continue to work as an actress and an artist. Their marriage lasted 15 years and produced one child, Clément Marot Jr. (1928–2010). The couple divorced in 1944.

== Legacy and in popular culture ==
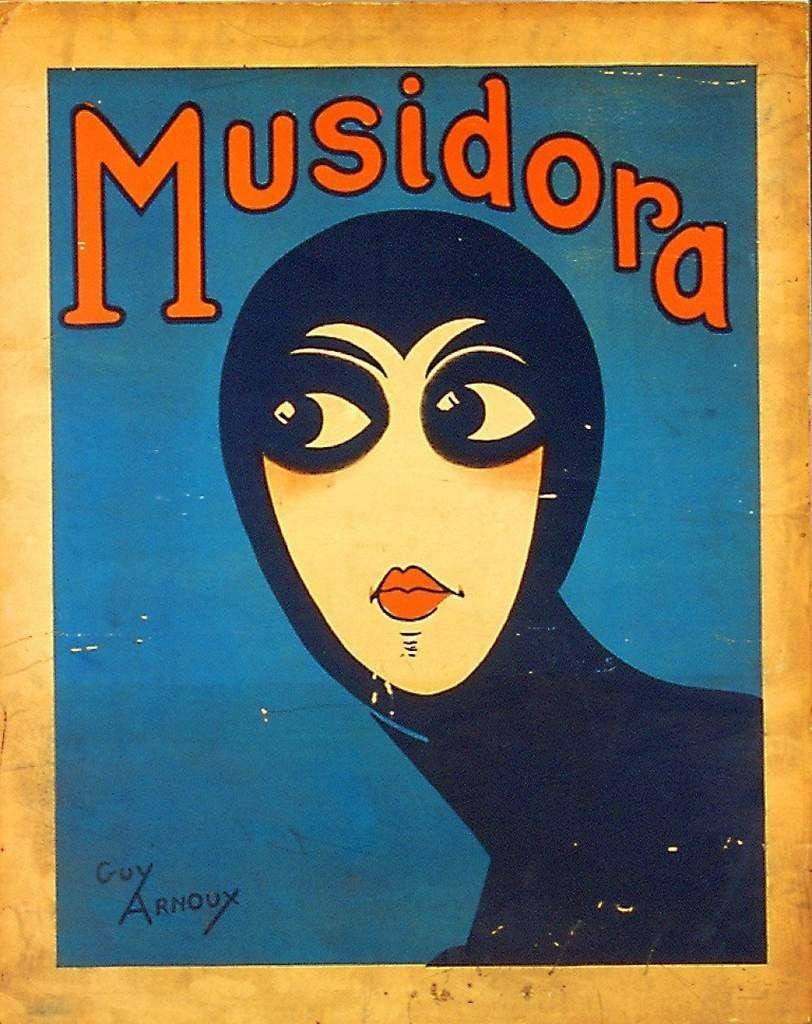
Poster by Guy Arnoux depicting Musidora as Irma Vep (1915)

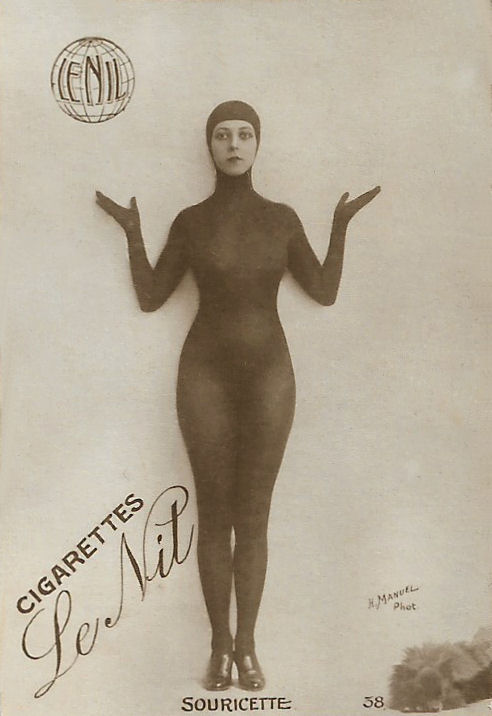
Advertisement for the Le Nil cigarettes "Souricette" (Little Mouse). Musidora, dons her black silken Irma Vep bodysuit once again, even though she only wore it twice in Les Vampires.

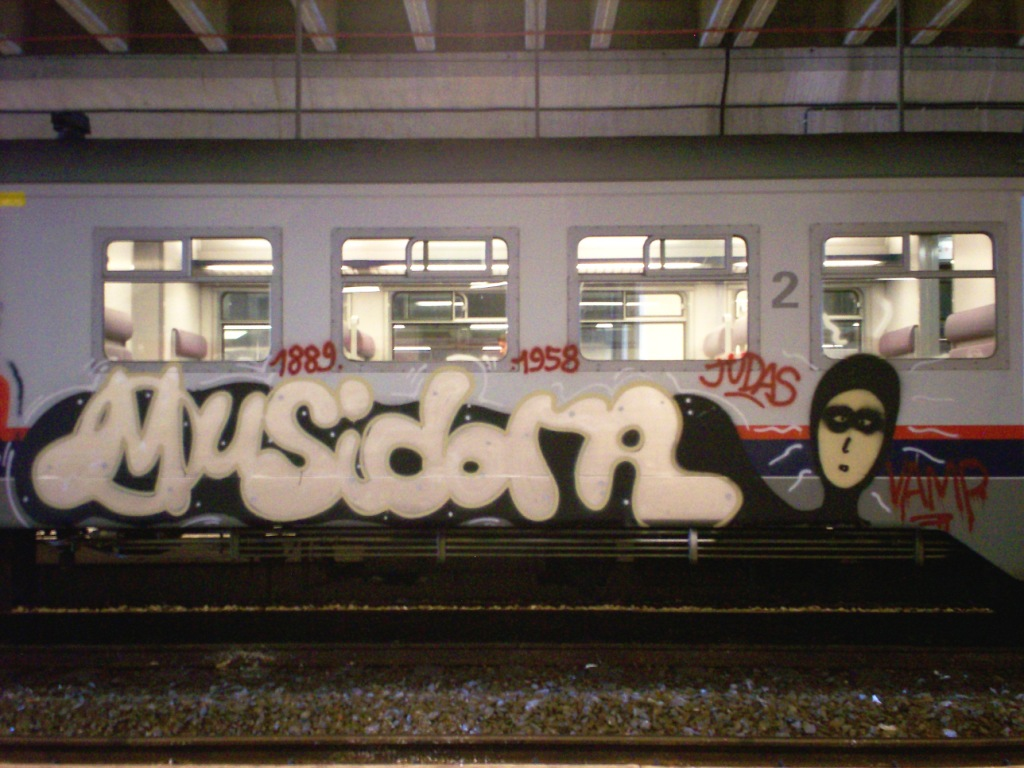
A graffiti mural on a métro in tribute to Musidora.

In 1974, the feminist film collective "Musidora" organised the first feminist film festival in France, named after Musidora.

"Les Amis de Musidora" (The Friends of Musidora) association was founded in 2014, and regularly publishes in its journals the results of its research on her life and work.

In 2019, the Bologna Film Festival honoured Musidora by screening a biographical documentary as well as the 1922 film Soleil et Ombre (Sun and Shadow), and by using as the logo for its 33rd edition the stylised portrait of the actress and director.

In 2019, through a vote, users of the community centre on rue François-Truffaut in Paris (12th arrondissement) chose "Musidora" as the centre's name. Following this participatory process, the Paris City Council officially adopted the name "Centre Paris Anim' Musidora" at its July 2019 meeting.

In 2020, Carole Aurouet, Marie-Claude Cherqui, and Laurent Véray organised the first symposium dedicated to Musidora. The proceedings of this symposium were published in 2022 by Éditions de Grenelle under the title Musidora, Who Are You?

In 2022, actor and director Hugo Bardin (in character as his drag queen Paloma) and his friend Kameliya paid tribute to Musidora in episode 7 of the show Drag Race France, performing a mime in costume and makeup as Irma Vep.

In 2022, a biographical graphic novel titled Musidora, Once Upon a Time in Cinema, written by Arnaud Delalande and illustrated by Nicolas Puzenat, was published by Éditions Robinson.

On 9 November 2023, the municipal council of Bois-le-Roi, decided to name its new cultural facility as "Médiathèque Musidora". The centre was inaugurated on 28 June 2025.

In 2026 Les Amis de Musidora announced that they had rediscovered La Magique Image (1950), and it was screened by the Cinémathèque française, as part of the 13th Cinémathèque Festival.

== Filmography ==
=== As actress ===
Year	Title	Role	Director	Archive status	Notes
1909	Le Troisième Larron (The Third Thief)				A Gaumont production
1910	La Main noire (The Black Hand)		Étienne Arnaud		
1913	L'Aventure de Jean Loupin (Jean Loupin's Adventure)				A Gaumont production
1913	Le Drapeau (The Flag)				A Gaumont production
1914	La Ville de Madame Tango (Madame Tango's City)	The tangomaniaque			A Pathé-Frères production
1914	Les Misères de l'aiguille (Miseries of the Needle)	Seamstress	Raphaël Clamour		Produced by the socialist film collective Le Cinéma du Peuple
1914	Severo Torelli	Portia	Louis Feuillade	Cinémathèque Française	
1914	Le Calvaire (The Ordeal)	The dancer Bianca Flor, Frondier's mistress	Louis Feuillade	Lost	
1914	Tu n'épouseras jamais un avocat (You'll Never Marry a Lawyer)	Estelle Morille	Louis Feuillade	Lost	
1914	L'Union sacrée (The Sacred Union)	Typist	Louis Feuillade	Louis	
1914	Bout de Zan et l'espion (Bout de Zan and the Spy or Bout de Zan and the Boches)		Louis Feuillade	Lost	
1914	Les Fiancées de 1914 (The Fiancées of 1914)		Louis Feuillade		
1914	Sainte Odile		Gaston Ravel		
1914	Les Trois Rats (The Three Rats)	Opéra rat	Gaston Ravel		
1914	La Bouquetière des Catalans (The Flower Girl of the Catalans)		Gaston Ravel		
1914	Les Leçons de la guerre (The Lessons of War)		Gaston Ravel		
1914	La Petite Réfugiée (The Little Refugee)		Gaston Ravel		
1914	L'Autre Victoire (The Other Victory)		Gaston Ravel		
1914	Le Roman de la midinette (The Romance of the Young Girl)		Gaston Ravel	Lost	
1915	Le Furoncle (The Boil)		Gaston Ravel		
1915	Celui qui reste (The One Who Remains)	Suzanne Gervon	Louis Feuillade	Lost	
1915	Le Coup du fakir (The Feat of the Fakir)		Louis Feuillade	Lost	
1915	Deux Françaises (Two French Women)	Mme Castel	Louis Feuillade	Lost	
1915	Fifi tambour (Fifi the Drummer)		Louis Feuillade	Lost	
1915	L'Escapade de Filoche (Filoche's Escapade)	Mme Pichepin	Louis Feuillade	Lost	
1915	Les Noces d'argent (The Silver Wedding)		Louis Feuillade	Lost	
1915	Bouboule		Louis Feuillade		
1915	Le Sosie (The Lookalike)		Louis Feuillade	Lost	
1915	La Barrière (The Barrier)		Gaston Ravel or Louis Feuillade		
1915	Le Fer à cheval (The Horseshoe)		Louis Feuillade	Lost	
1915	Le Collier de perles (The Pearl Necklace)		Louis Feuillade	Lost	
1915	Bout de Zan et le poilu (Bout de Zan and the Hairy One)		Louis Feuillade	Lost	
1915	Jeunes filles d'hier et d'aujourd'hui (Young Girls of Yesterday and Today)		Louis Feuillade	Lost	
1915	Triple entente		Gaston Ravel	Lost	
1915	Le Trophée du zouave (The Zouave Trophy)		Gaston Ravel		
1915	Le Grand Souffle (The Great Breath)		Gaston Ravel		
1915	L'Autre devoir (The Other Duty)		Léonce Perret		
1915	Les Vampires: 3. Le Cryptogramme rouge (The Vampires: Episode 3 – "The Red Codebook")	Irma Vep, alias Anne-Marie Le Goff, Guérand's maid	Louis Feuillade	Cinémathèque Française; Library of Congress	
1916	Les Vampires: 4. Le Spectre (The Vampires: Episode 4 – "The Spectre")	Irma Vep, alias Juliette Berteaux, typist at the Renoux-Duval bank	Louis Feuillade	Cinémathèque Française; Library of Congress	
1916	Les Vampires: 5. L'Évasion du mort (The Vampires: Episode 5 – "Dead Man's Escape")	Irma Vep, alias Mlle de Mortesaigues	Louis Feuillade	Cinémathèque Française; Library of Congress	
1916	Les Vampires: 6. Les Yeux qui fascinent (The Vampires: Episode 6 – "Hypnotic Eyes")	Irma Vep, alias Viscount Guy de Kerlor	Louis Feuillade	Cinémathèque Française; Library of Congress	
1916	Les Vampires: 7. Satanas (The Vampires: Episode 7 – "Satanas")	Irma Vep, alias Marie Boissier of the Chronograph Company, and Noémie Patoche, the fake telephone operator	Louis Feuillade	Cinémathèque Française; Library of Congress	
1916	Les Vampires: 8. Le Maître de la foudre (The Vampires: Episode 8 – "The Thunder Master")	Irma Vep	Louis Feuillade	Cinémathèque Française; Library of Congress	
1916	Les Vampires: 9. L'Homme des poisons (The Vampires: Episode 9 – "The Poisoner")	Irma Vep, alias Aurélie Plateau	Louis Feuillade	Cinémathèque Française; Library of Congress	
1916	Les Vampires: 10. Les Noces sanglantes (The Vampires: Episode 10 – "The Terrible Wedding")	Irma Vep	Louis Feuillade	Cinémathèque Française; Library of Congress	
1916	C'est le printemps ! (It's Spring!)	The artist's maid	Louis Feuillade		
1916	Cœur fragile (Fragile Heart)		Gaston Ravel		
1916	Fille d'Ève (Daughter of Eve)		Gaston Ravel		
1916	Le Pied qui étreint (The Foot That Embraces)	Irma Vep, in the final installment, "The Man with the Polka Dot Scarf"	Jacques Feyder	Cinémathèque Française	
1916	Simple erreur (Simple Mistake)		Gaston Ravel		
1916	Le Colonel Bontemps (Colonel Bontemps)	The Colonel's daughter	Louis Feuillade	Lost	
1916	Les Mariés d'un jour (Brides for a Day)		Louis Feuillade	Lost	
1916	Les Fourberies de Pingouin (Penguin's Rogueries)		Louis Feuillade	Lost	
1916	Les Fiançailles d'Agénor (Agénor's Engagement)	Amélie	Louis Feuillade	Lost	
1916	Le Poète et sa folle amante (The Poet and his Mad Lover)		Louis Feuillade	Lost	
1916	Si vous ne l'aimez pas... (If You Don't Like It...)	Simone	Louis Feuillade	Lost	
1916	La Peine du talion (The Penalty of Retaliation)	Rosa Larose	Louis Feuillade	Lost	
1916	Lagourdette gentleman cambrioleur (Lagourdette, Gentleman Burglar)	Lagourdette's friend	Louis Feuillade	Gaumont Pathé Archives	
1916	Minne		Jacques de Baroncelli		Unfinished film, adapted by Musidora from Colette's novel L'Ingénue libertine
1917	C'est pour les orphelins ! (This is for the Orphans: The Artist's Wakening )		Louis Feuillade	Lobster Films	Benefit film
1917	Judex: 1. L'Ombre mystérieuse (Judex: Episode 1 – "The Mysterious Shadow")	The adventuress Diana Monti, alias Marie Verdier	Louis Feuillade	Cinémathèque Royale de Belgique; Centre National du Cinéma et de l'Image Animée [FRB] Cinémathèque Française; Svenska Filminstitutet; BFI National Archive; Cineteca Nazionale; Národní Filmov Archiv; George Eastman Museum; Lobster Films; Library of Congress	
1917	Judex: 2. L'Expiation (Judex: Episode 2 – "Atonement")	Diana Monti	Louis Feuillade	Cinémathèque Royale de Belgique; Centre National du Cinéma et de l'Image Animée [FRB] Cinémathèque Française; Svenska Filminstitutet; BFI National Archive; Cineteca Nazionale; Národní Filmov Archiv; George Eastman Museum; Lobster Films; Library of Congress	
1917	Judex: 3. La Meute fantastique (Judex: Episode 3 – "The Fantastic Hounds")	Diana Monti	Louis Feuillade	Cinémathèque Royale de Belgique; Centre National du Cinéma et de l'Image Animée [FRB] Cinémathèque Française; Svenska Filminstitutet; BFI National Archive; Cineteca Nazionale; Národní Filmov Archiv; George Eastman Museum; Lobster Films; Library of Congress	
1917	Judex: 4. Le Secret de la tombe (Judex: Episode 4 – "The Secret of the Tomb")	Diana Monti	Louis Feuillade	Cinémathèque Royale de Belgique; Centre National du Cinéma et de l'Image Animée [FRB] Cinémathèque Française; Svenska Filminstitutet; BFI National Archive; Cineteca Nazionale; Národní Filmov Archiv; George Eastman Museum; Lobster Films; Library of Congress	
1917	Judex: 5. Le Moulin tragique (Judex: Episode 5 – "The Tragic Mill")	Diana Monti	Louis Feuillade	Cinémathèque Royale de Belgique; Centre National du Cinéma et de l'Image Animée [FRB] Cinémathèque Française; Svenska Filminstitutet; BFI National Archive; Cineteca Nazionale; Národní Filmov Archiv; George Eastman Museum; Lobster Films; Library of Congress	
1917	Judex: 6. Le Môme réglisse (Judex: Episode 6 – "The Licorice Kid")	Diana Monti	Louis Feuillade	Cinémathèque Royale de Belgique; Centre National du Cinéma et de l'Image Animée [FRB] Cinémathèque Française; Svenska Filminstitutet; BFI National Archive; Cineteca Nazionale; Národní Filmov Archiv; George Eastman Museum; Lobster Films; Library of Congress	
1917	Judex: 7. La Femme en noir (Judex: Episode 7 – "The Woman in Black")	Diana Monti	Louis Feuillade	Cinémathèque Royale de Belgique; Centre National du Cinéma et de l'Image Animée [FRB] Cinémathèque Française; Svenska Filminstitutet; BFI National Archive; Cineteca Nazionale; Národní Filmov Archiv; George Eastman Museum; Lobster Films; Library of Congress	
1917	Judex: 8. Les Souterrains du Château-Rouge (Judex: Episode 8 – "The Dungeons of the Chateau-Rouge")	Diana Monti	Louis Feuillade	Cinémathèque Royale de Belgique; Centre National du Cinéma et de l'Image Animée [FRB] Cinémathèque Française; Svenska Filminstitutet; BFI National Archive; Cineteca Nazionale; Národní Filmov Archiv; George Eastman Museum; Lobster Films; Library of Congress	
1917	Judex: 9. Lorsque l'enfant parut (Judex: Episode 9 – "When the Child Appeared")	Diana Monti	Louis Feuillade	Cinémathèque Royale de Belgique; Centre National du Cinéma et de l'Image Animée [FRB] Cinémathèque Française; Svenska Filminstitutet; BFI National Archive; Cineteca Nazionale; Národní Filmov Archiv; George Eastman Museum; Lobster Films; Library of Congress	
1917	Judex: 10. Le Cœur de Jacqueline (Judex: Episode 10 – "The Heart of Jacqueline")	Diana Monti	Louis Feuillade	Cinémathèque Royale de Belgique; Centre National du Cinéma et de l'Image Animée [FRB] Cinémathèque Française; Svenska Filminstitutet; BFI National Archive; Cineteca Nazionale; Národní Filmov Archiv; George Eastman Museum; Lobster Films; Library of Congress	
1917	Judex: 11. L'Ondine (Judex: Episode 11 – "The Water Sprite")	Diana Monti	Louis Feuillade	Cinémathèque Royale de Belgique; Centre National du Cinéma et de l'Image Animée [FRB] Cinémathèque Française; Svenska Filminstitutet; BFI National Archive; Cineteca Nazionale; Národní Filmov Archiv; George Eastman Museum; Lobster Films; Library of Congress	
1917	Judex: 12. Le Pardon d'amour (Judex: Episode 12 – "The Forgiveness of Love")	Diana Monti	Louis Feuillade	Cinémathèque Royale de Belgique; Centre National du Cinéma et de l'Image Animée [FRB] Cinémathèque Française; Svenska Filminstitutet; BFI National Archive; Cineteca Nazionale; Národní Filmov Archiv; George Eastman Museum; Lobster Films; Library of Congress	
1917	Débrouille-toi (Figure It Out)	Mlle Friquette	Louis Feuillade	Lost	
1917	Le Maillot noir (The Black Jersey)	As herself	Musidora		Short
1917	Mon oncle (My Uncle)		Louis Feuillade	Lost	
1917	Les Chacals (The Jackals)	Dolores Melrose, Hampton's fiancée	André Hugon		
1918	La Vagabonde (The Vagabond)		Eugenio Perego and Musidora	Lost	Adapted by Musidora and Colette from Colette's novel of the same name
1918	Johannes, fils de Johannes (Johannes, Son of Johannes	Gabrielle Baude	André Hugon		
1918	La Geôle (The Jail)	Marie-Ange Gaël, the Madonna	Gaston Ravel		
1918	La Jeune Fille la plus méritante de France (The Most Deserving Young Woman in France)	The four seasons merchant	Germaine Dulac		
1919	Mam'zelle Chiffon	Chiffon, the milliner	André Hugon		
1920	La Flamme cachée (The Hidden Flame)	Annie Morin, the student	Musidora and Roger Lion	Lost	Also co-producer and co-screenwriter, based on an original screenplay by Colette
1920	Vicenta	Vicenta, the innkeeper's daughter	Musidora	Cinémathèque Française [incomplete, only a 19-minute fragment survives]	Also screenwriter and producer
1921	Pour don Carlos a.k.a. Les Monstres se révoltent (For Don Carlos a.k.a. The Monsters Revolt)	Allégria	Jacques Lasseyne and Musidora	Cinémathèque Française (most complete)	Also screenwriter and producer
1922	Une aventure de Musidora en Espagne (Musidora's Adventure in Spain)		Musidora		Also co-producer and co-screenwriter
1922	Soleil et Ombre (Sol y sombra) (Sun and Shadow)	Juana, the innkeeper's maid; and the foreign blonde	Jaime De Lasuen and Musidora	Cinémathèque Française, Filmoteca Española	Also co-producer
1924	La Terre des taureaux (La tierra de los toros) (Land of the Bulls)	As herself and the "ugly girl"	Musidora	Cinémathèque de Toulouse; Centre National du Cinéma et de l'Image Animée; Library of Congress	Also producer and screenwriter
1926	Le Berceau de Dieu a.k.a. Les Ombres du passé (Shadows of the Past a.k.a. The Cradle of God)		Fred LeRoy Granville		Also co-producer and co-screenwriter
1950	La Magique Image (The Magic Image)	Old gypsy woman	Musidora	Cinémathèque Française (rediscovered in 2026)	Also co-producer and co-screenwriter

=== As director ===
Year	Title	Notes
1917	Le Maillot noir (The Black Jersey)	Appeared as herself
1918	La Vagabonde (The Vagabond)	Also actor, co-screenwriter and co-director with Eugenio Perego
1920	La Flamme cachée (The Hidden Flame)	Also actor, co-directed with Roger Lion, and co-producer
1920	Vicenta	Also actor, screenwriter, and co-producer
1921	Pour don Carlos a.k.a. Les Monstres se révoltent (For Don Carlos a.k.a. The Monsters Revolt)	Also actor, co-director with Jacques Lasseyne, and producer
1922	Une aventure de Musidora en Espagne ( Musidora's Adventure in Spain)	Also actor
1922	Soleil et Ombre (Sol y sombra) (Sun and Shadow)	Also actor, co-director with Jaime De Lasuen, producer and screenwriter
1924	La Terre des taureaux (La tierra de los toros) (Land of the Bulls)	Also actor
1950	La Magique Image (The Magic Image)	Also actor, producer and screenwriter

== Writing ==
- Musidora, "Vicenta". Comoedia illustré (15 February 1920): 207-208.
- Musidora, Comment j'ai tourné Don Carlos [How I Filmed Don Carlos]. Ève (30 January 1921): 10.
- Musidora-Pierre Louÿs: une amitié amoureuse : récit et correspondances, 1914–1924 [A Loving Friendship: Narrative and Correspondence, 1914–1924] OCLC 1236010043
- Musidora, Grandes Enquètes d'Ève: Comment je suis devenue Torera [Ève's Great Investigations: How I Became a Torera]. Ève (28 September 1924): 11–18.
- Musidora, En Amour tout est possible [In Love, Anything Is Possible]. Paris: Éditions Eugène Figuière, 1928. OCLC 469033921
- Musidora, Arabella et Arlequin, roman [Arabella and Harlequin], 1928. OCLC 469033903
- Musidora, Paroxysmes. De l'amour à la mort [Paroxysms. From Love to Death]. Paris: Éditions Eugène Figuière, 1934.
- Musidora, Auréoles : poésies scandées [Halos: Chanted Poems]. Paris: Éditions Arnaud, 1939. Preface by Wilfrid Lucas. OCLC 759756149
- Musidora, La Vie d'une vamp [The Life of a Vamp], Ciné-Mondial 42–48 (12 June – 17 July 1942): n.p.
- Musidora, La vie sentimentale de George Sand [The Romantic Life of George Sand]. Paris: Éditions de la Revue moderne, 1946. OCLC 66135217
- Musidora, Souvenirs sur Pierre Louÿs [Memories of Pierre Louÿs]. Muizon: Éditions "À L'écart", 1984.
- Musidora, Interview with Renée Sylvaire. Manuscript. Committee on Historical Research Collection (Fonds Commission des Recherches Historiques), CHR29-B1. Bibliothèque du Film, Cinémathèque Française.
- Musidora, Colette et le Cinéma Muet [Colette and Silent Cinema]. In Patrick Cazals, Musidora. La dixième muse [Musidora, the Tenth Muse]. Paris: Éditions Henry Veryier, 1978. 195–199.

== Sources ==
- Förster, Annette (1998). "De verering van een schim: Musidora en de overlev(er)ing van Irma Vep" [The Worship of a Phantom: Musidora and the Survival (Tradition) of Irma Vep] (PDF). Tijdschrift voor Mediageschiedenis [Journal of Media History] (in Dutch). 1 (1).
- Förster, Annette (2017). Women in the Silent Cinema: Histories of Fame and Fate (PDF). Framing Film. Amsterdam: Amsterdam University Press. doi:10.5117/9789089647191. ISBN 9789048524518. S2CID 214501361.
- d'Hugues, Philippe [in French]; Marmin, Michel; Mitry, Jean; Richard, Jacques [in French] (1986). Le Cinéma français – le muet [French Cinema – Silent Film] (in French). Éditions Atlas. ISBN 2-7312-0462-1.
- Tierchant, Hélène (2014). Musidora, la première vamp [Musidora, the First Vamp]. Les influentes (in French). Paris: Éditions Télémaque. ISBN 978-2-7533-0187-0.
