= Henriette Tilly =

- Occupation: Tailor

Henriette Tilly (19th century-20th century), was a French seamstress, anarchist and anarcho-syndicalist activist. Close to syndicalist circles, she became the treasurer or president of the Comité Féminin, the most significant anarcha-feminist organization in Paris in the early 1910s.

She is also known, alongside Jane Morand, for having greatly influenced the anarchist cooperative Le Cinéma du Peuple, which she helped found, in its focus on feminist themes. Her influence enabled the creation of the first feminist film in history, Les Misères de l’aiguille.

== Biography ==
Henriette Tilly was a seamstress in Paris, where she resided at 46 Avenue d'Allemagne. Her partner was Maxime Masson, another anarchist of the time, who organized the anarchist movement in the 15th arrondissement. She was connected with syndicalists and notably exchanged several letters with Pierre Monatte, with whom she appeared to be close.

In 1913, Tilly first participated in the intentional community of the Milieu Libre de la Pie, nicknamed the Phalanstère de Saint-Maur. Later, alongside Madeleine Pelletier, she joined the Groupe des Mille Communistes. Finally, she succeeded Jane Morand as treasurer or president of the Comité Féminin, the most significant feminist and revolutionary group in Paris at the time, which adhered to an anarchist ideology.

In October 1913, Henriette Tilly co-founded Le Cinéma du Peuple with other anarchists. This cooperative was dedicated to producing anarchist films, and Tilly appeared to be particularly influential in shaping the feminist and anarcha-feminist direction the cooperative took from the outset. This feminist push culminated in the production of the first feminist film in history, Les Misères de l’aiguille.

She opposed France's entry into World War I and stood firmly against the war. In 1914, Tilly wrote to Pierre Monatte to congratulate him for resigning from his position in this context.
