= Maxa =

Maxa (feminine Maxová) is a Czech surname. Notable people with the surname include:

- František Maxa (1923–2021), Czech sport shooter
- Jaroslava Maxová (born 1957), Czech opera singer
- Radka Maxová (born 1968), Czech politician
- Rudy Maxa (born 1949), American consumer travel expert
- Tereza Maxová (born 1971), Czech model

== See also ==
- Maxa Nordau, French painter
