= Albert Libertad =

French anarchist (1875–1908)

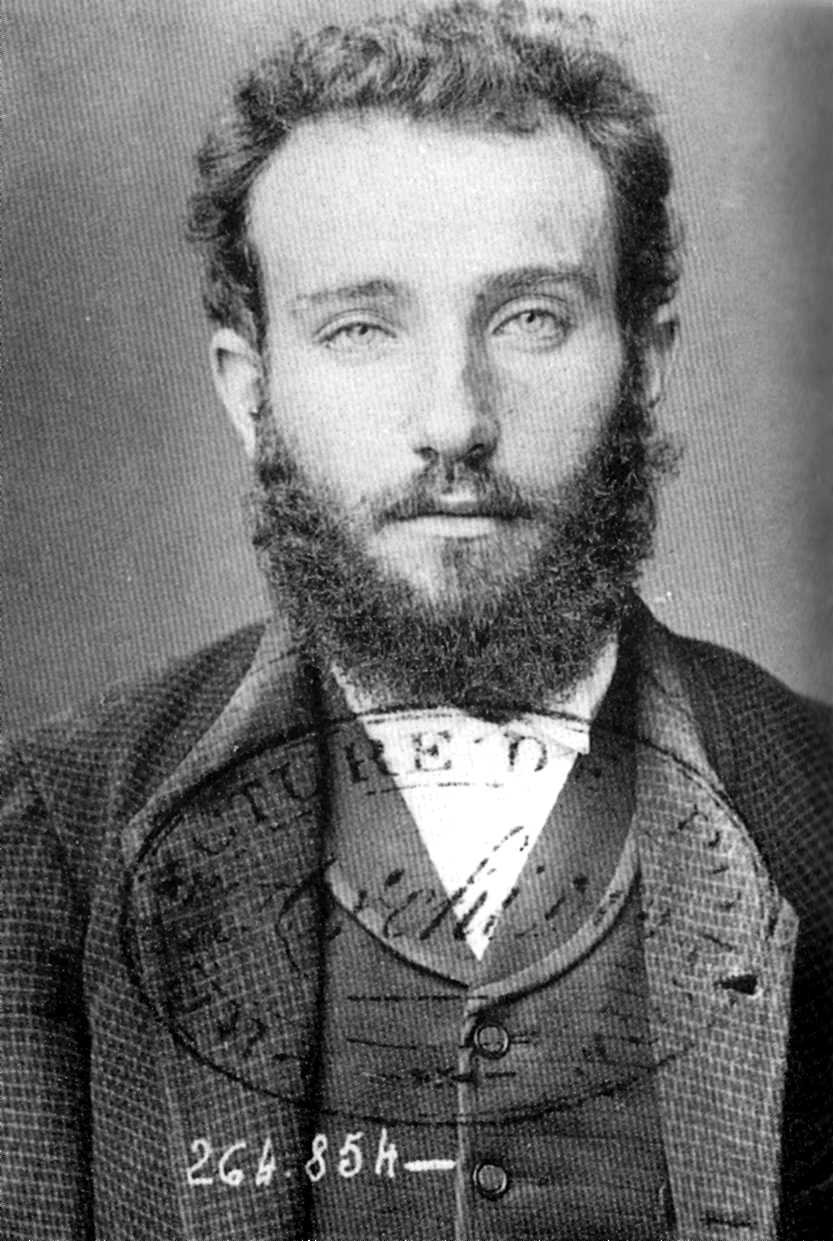
Albert Libertad

Joseph Albert (known as Albert Libertad or Libertad; 24 November 1875 – 12 November 1908) was an anarchist militant and writer from France who edited the influential anarchist publication L'Anarchie.

== Life and work ==
He was born in Bordeaux, and died in Paris. Abandoned by his parents as a baby, Libertad was a child of the Public Assistance in Bordeaux. As a result of a childhood illness, he lost the use of his legs, but put his handicap to good use, using his crutches as weapons against the police. He moved to Paris at 21, where he soon became active in anarchist circles, going so far as to live in the offices of the journal "Le Libertaire." A member of various anarchist groups, and a supporter of "propaganda by the deed," he was nevertheless an abstentionist candidate in Paris's 11th arrondissement in 1902 and 1904, seeing his candidacy as a means of spreading anarchist ideas. During the Dreyfus affair, he founded the Anti-Militarist League (1902) "and, along with Paraf-Javal, founded the "Causeries populaires", public discussions that met with great interest throughout the country, contributing to the opening of a bookstore and various clubs in different quarters of Paris".

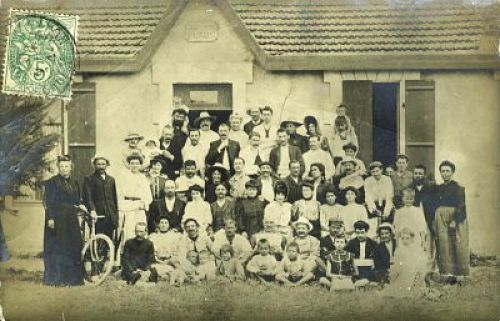
Libertaire-Plage vacationers

In 1905, Libertad founded what was probably the most important individualist anarchist journal, L'Anarchie, which included among its collaborators André Lorulot, Émile Armand, and Victor Serge and his companion Rirette Maîtrejean. The French theorist of the Situationist International Raoul Vaneigem reports that Libertad gained notoriety for a call to action in which he "invited citizens to burn their ID papers and to become humans again, refusing to let themselves be reduced to a number, duly filed in the statistic state inventories of slaves." Libertaire-Plage, a libertarian summer camp in Châtelaillon-Plage, southwest France, was based around Albert Libertad and L'Anarchie in the early 1900s.

== Anarchism ==
On the occasion of the July 14 anniversary, L'Anarchie "printed and distributed the manifesto "The Bastille of Authority" in one hundred thousand copies. Along with feverish activity against the social order, Libertad was usually also organizing feasts, dances and country excursions, in consequence of his vision of anarchism as the "joy of living" and not as militant sacrifice and death instinct, seeking to reconcile the requirements of the individual (in his need for autonomy) with the need to destroy authoritarian society. In fact, Libertad overcame the false dichotomy between individual revolt and social revolution, stressing that the first is simply a moment of the second, certainly not its negation. Revolt can only be born from the specific tension of the individual, which, in expanding itself, can only lead to a project of social liberation. For Libertad, anarchism doesn't consist in living separated from any social context in some cold ivory tower or on some happy communitarian isle, nor in living in submission to social roles, putting off the moment when one puts one's ideas into practice to the bitter end, but in living as anarchists here and now, without any concessions, in the only way possible: by rebelling. And this is why, in this perspective, individual revolt and social revolution no longer exclude each other, but rather complement each other."

== See also ==
- Anarchism in France
- Anna Mahé
- Individualist anarchism in Europe

== Notes ==
- Albert Libertad, Le Culte de la charogne. Anarchisme, un état de révolution permanente (1897–1908), Éditions Agone, 2006. ISBN 2-7489-0022-7
- EnDehors website
