= Le Cinéma du Peuple =

French anarchist film cooperative

- Industry: Movies
- Genre: Anarchism, Feminism
- Founded: 28 October 1913; 112 years ago in Paris, France
- Founder: André Girard; Charles-Ange Laisant; Jean Grave; Marcel Martinet; Sébastien Faure
- Defunct: 1914
- Headquarters: France
- Key people: Yves Bidamant, Jean Grave, Armand Guerra

Le Cinéma du Peuple was an anarchist film production cooperative active from 1913 to 1914. It is generally considered the first left-wing activist group to engage in film production. Its members included revolutionary syndicalists and anarcha-feminists. The cooperative is also known for creating Les Misères de l'aiguille (Miseries of the Needle) (1914), likely the first feminist film, and La Commune! Du 18 au 28 mars 1871 (1914), the first film about the Paris Commune. The film had a significant impact on the political consciousness of French society at the time.

== Background ==
After Mikhail Bakunin's death, the anarchist movement in France gradually organized itself within certain groups, particularly the Fédération communiste anarchiste. Initially, anarchists were opposed to the arrival of cinema, much like conservative Catholics and their Bonne Presse. They argued, for instance, that the proletariat was poorly represented in films and that cinema could also serve as a tool to stupefy the masses. Both the anarchists and the conservative Catholics quickly came to embrace film production and distribution, concluding that this new invention was a highly effective way to share their ideas.

Anarchists were particularly uneasy with the fact that the majority of film productions seemed to convey the values and ideology of capitalism. In September 1913, shortly before the cooperative's founding, Yves Bidamant, its future main organizer, criticized traditional cinema in Le Libertaire, condemning the "Nick Carter, Fantômas, and other serialized products shown nightly in suburban cinemas". In this article, he emphasized the need to establish an organization capable of producing anarchist films and creating anarchist cinema. In reality, the group had already begun forming earlier that summer and was reportedly announced in August of the same year. Additionally, many revolutionary syndicalists—a movement closely aligned with anarchism—showed interest in the project and supported it, joining forces with the anarchists, who made up the majority of the group.

== History ==
Yves Bidamant and Robert Guérard, a well-known anarchist songwriter from the 1890s–1900s, officially founded the cooperative on 28 October 1913. It was funded by 40 equal shares of 25 francs for a total of 1,000 francs. Among the anarchists who subscribed were Yves Bidamant, Robert Guérard, Paul Benoist, Gustave Cauvin, Félix Chevalier, Henriette Tilly, and Charles-Ange Laisant. Other prominent anarchists also joined the project, including Lucien Descaves, Jean Grave, Pierre Martin, and Sébastien Faure.

Its purpose, as described in its charter, is:

1. The production, reproduction, sale, and rental of cinematographic films, as well as all related equipment and accessories;

2. Propaganda and education through artistic and theatrical performances, lectures, etc. ...

The Society will strive to elevate the intellectual level of the people. It will remain in constant ideological alignment with various proletarian groups based on the class struggle, aiming for the abolition of wage labor through economic and social transformation.

The organization produced a number of films and achieved some success. Among the actresses involved in their productions were Lina Clamour and Marion Desclos, while actors included figures such as Fred Michelet. Armand Guerra handled the photography for their first film, while Raphaël Clamour both acted in and directed it.

From October to May, the cooperative produced 4,895 meters of film. The films produced were as follows :

- Les Misères de l'aiguille (Miseries of the Needle), 18 January 1914
- Les Obsèques du citoyen Francis de Pressensé (The Funeral of Citizen Francis de Pressensé), 31 January 1914
- Victime des exploiteurs (Victim of the Exploiters), 28 March 1914, Palais des Fêtes, Rue Saint-Martin, large hall with 2,500 seats; a study on labor
- L'Hiver ! Plaisirs de riches ! Souffrances des pauvres ! (Winter, Pleasures for the Rich, Sufferings for the Poor!), 31 January 1914
- La Commune ! Du 18 au 28 mars 1871 (The Commune! From 18 to 28 March 1871), 28 March 1914, Palais des Fêtes
- Le Vieux docker (The Old Docker), 28 March 1914

In May 1914, the organization increased its capital to 30,000 francs, divided into 600 shares of 50 francs each. The organization had to close with the onset of World War I and the general mobilization in France.

== Legacy ==
The films produced by the cooperative were forgotten and ignored by many art and film historians. They were rediscovered later through more recent research. Philippe Esnault, in particular, is said to have tried to write about them, but his completed manuscript was ultimately stolen.

Their first film, Les Misères de l'aiguille (Miseries of the Needle), is likely the first feminist film in the world. It explicitly addresses the condition of female workers, making it its central theme. The cooperative also produced another film on the condition of women, as well as the first film dedicated to the Paris Commune. It had a significant impact on the political consciousness of France at the time.

== Bibliography ==
- Mundim, Luiz Felipe Cezar (July 2019). "As misérias da agulha do Cinema do Povo: um filme feminista no primeiro cinema" [The miseries of the needle of the cooperative Cinéma du Peuple: a feminist movie in the early cinema]. Significação: Revista de Cultura Audiovisual (in Portuguese). 46 (52): 16–38. doi:10.11606/issn.2316-7114.sig.2019.147866. ISSN 2316-7114.
