= Anna Mahé =

French anarchist (1882-1960)

- Born: 31 July 1882; Bourgneuf-en-Retz, France
- Died: 8 November 1960 (aged 78); Clichy-La Garenne, France
- Resting place: Père Lachaise Cemetery
- Occupation(s): Teacher, typographer
- Movement: Anarchism in France
- Spouse: Pierre Georges Miremont (m. 1917; died 1949)
- Partner(s): Albert Libertad (1903-1907); André de Blasiis (1907-1917)
- Relatives: Armandine Mahé (sister)

Anna Mahé (1882–1960) was a French teacher, typographer and anarchist activist.

== Biography ==
Anna Mahé was born in Bourgneuf-en-Retz, on 31 July 1882. The daughter of a shoemaker, she had the opportunity to receive a higher education at a school in Nantes. She graduated in 1900 and became a teacher at the same school, where she was popular with both her students and fellow teachers. In 1902, she was appointed to teach at a rural school in Les Sorinières.

By this time, she had become influenced by libertarianism and began making anti-capitalist, anti-militarist and anti-patriotic remarks. When Mahé's style of pedagogy was investigated by a school inspector in 1903, she was found to be teaching in a way that was "hostile to society and its institutions". She was accused of professional misconduct, although the inspector pleaded for leniency due to Mahé's youth.

After the investigation, Mahé decided not to return to teaching and requested sick leave, claiming to be sick with a respiratory illness. In reality, she was pregnant and feared the consequences of revealing she had become pregnant outside of wedlock. The child had been fathered by her Albert Libertad, who was also the partner of Mahé's sister Armandine, and the three of them lived together in a polyamorous relationship. They moved to Montmartre, in Paris, but Mahé was unable to find work there as a teacher, so she quit this career path. On 26 April 1904, she gave birth to her son, registered as "Émile Marcel" under anonymous parentage; the family would call him "Minus", as they did not want to impose a first name on him.

Mahé began writing articles on pedagogy for Le Libertaire, criticising the French state education system's focus on spelling, which she felt was at the expense of educating children in science. She also advocated for reforms of French orthography, in order to simplify the written language. She also co-founded Libertad's periodical L'Anarchie, for which she wrote several articles on education. She also organised libertarian cultural events, including holidays in Châtelaillon and weekly walks around Paris. In 1905, she joined the Association internationale antimilitariste (AIA) and participated in antimilitarist demonstrations in Paris, during which she was arrested.

When contributors to L'Anarchie moved in together at the periodical's office building, a conflict arose over Libertad having allegedly embezzled money from the paper's unpaid contributors. Although Armandine Mahé was among the accusers, Anna Mahé defended Libertad from the charges. She again defended Libertad during his 1908 trial, which eventually resulted in his acquittal. But interpersonal conflicts continued to grip L'Anarchie collective, during which Libertad was physically attacked. As he lay dying in hospital, he did not receive any visitors, with both of the Mahé sisters having cut contact with him. In 1910, Mahé participated in the reorganisation of Le Libertaire, which changed its editorial line towards anarchist communism and syndicalism. She published antimilitarist articles for the paper, for which she was arrested and tried, but she was eventually acquitted of the charges against her.

By 1912, she was living together with her child and her new partner André de Blasiis in Asnières. While living on parole for the theft of a typewriter, the couple worked together, with de Blasiis making shoes and Mahé delivering them. In 1913, they moved to the Basque Country, where the couple had married different partners by 1917; Mahé married Pierre Georges Miremont. The two couples cohabited together in Bayonne until the 1920s. Miremont became a prolific toy manufacturer, which supported them financially until the 1950s. In 1958, she sold the company and moved to Colombes, where she stayed with her sister. Anna Mahé died in the hospital of Clichy-La Garenne, on 8 November 1960. She was buried in Père Lachaise Cemetery.

== Bibliography ==
- R.D. (27 May 2008). "MAHE, Anna, Marie-Rose". Dictionnaire des militants anarchistes (in French).
- Davranche, Guillaume; Petit, Dominique; Steiner, Anne; Chevance, Michel (25 March 2014). "MAHÉ Anna, Rose, Marie". Dictionnaire des anarchistes (in French). Le Maitron.
