= André Hugon =

French film director, screenwriter and film producer

- Born: 17 December 1886; Algiers, French Algeria
- Died: 22 August 1960; Urval, Dordogne, France
- Occupation(s): Film director, screenwriter
- Years active: 1913–1952

André Hugon (17 December 1886 – 22 August 1960) was a French film director, screenwriter and film producer best known for his silent films from 1913 onwards, particularly of the 1920s and into sound.

Hugon was born in Algiers in 1886 which at the time was part of France. He directed some 90 films between 1913 and 1952.

== Selected filmography ==
- Flower of Paris (1916)
- The Gold Chignon (1916)
- The Jackals (1917)
- Anguish (1917)
- Vertigo (1917)
- Sharks (1917)
- A Crime Has Been Committed (1919)
- Mademoiselle Chiffon (1919)
- Jacques Landauze (1920)
- Worthless Woman (1921)
- The Fugitive (1920)
- The Black Diamond (1922)
- King of the Camargue (1922)
- The Two Pigeons (1922)
- The Little Thing (1923)
- La gitanilla (1924)
- The Thruster (1924)
- The Princess and the Clown (1924)
- Yasmina (1927)
- The Temple of Shadows (1927)
- The Great Passion (1928)
- The Three Masks (1929)
- The Wedding March (1929)
- Levy and Company (1930)
- Tenderness (1930)
- Moritz Makes his Fortune (1931)
- The Levy Department Stores (1932)
- The Sandman (1932)
- Southern Cross (1932)
- Maurin of the Moors (1932)
- If You Wish It (1932)
- The Illustrious Maurin (1933)
- Chourinette (1934)
- Gaspard de Besse (1935)
- Moses and Solomon, Perfumers (1935)
- Mercadet (1936)
- Monsieur Bégonia (1937)
- The Marriages of Mademoiselle Levy (1936)
- Romarin (1937)
- Sarati the Terrible (1937)
- Street Without Joy (1938)
- Heroes of the Marne (1938)
- Moulin Rouge (1941)
- Three Argentines in Montmartre (1941)
- Room 13 (1942)
- The Exile's Song (1943)
- Father Serge (1945)
- The Grand Hotel Affair (1946)
- The Village of Wrath (1947)
- Monsieur de Falindor (1947)
