= Lucien Descaves =

French novelist (1861–1949)

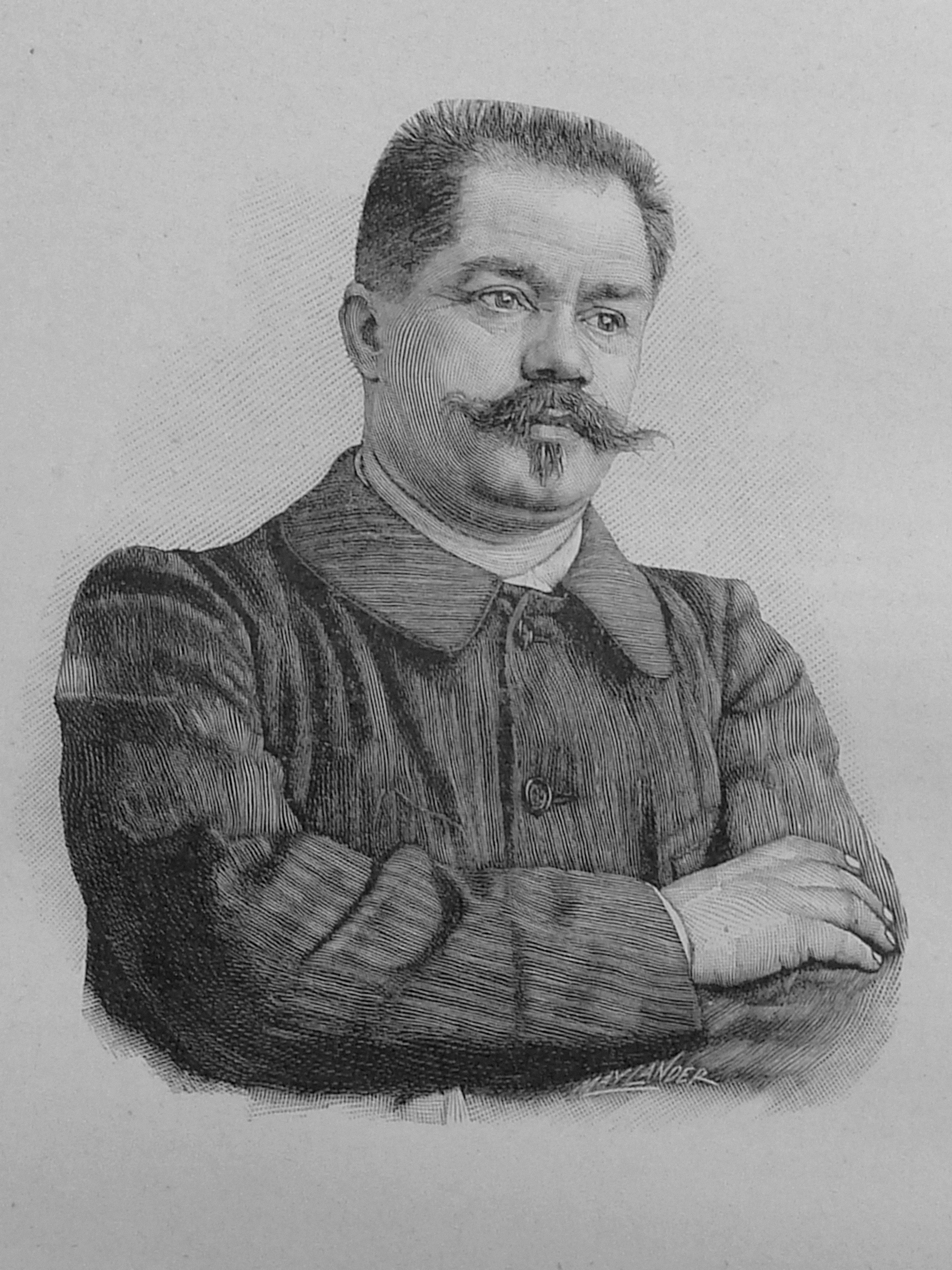
- 1908 portrait
- Born: 16 March 1861
- Died: 6 September 1949 (aged 88)
- Occupation: Novelist

Lucien Descaves (French pronunciation: [lysjɛ̃ dekav]; 16 March 1861 – 6 September 1949) was a French novelist.

== Selected works ==
- Le Calvaire de Héloïse Pajadou (1883) [Héloïse Pajadou's Calvary. Sunny Lou Publishing ISBN 978-1-95539-207-5, 2021]
