= L'Anarchie =

French individualist anarchist journal (1905–1914)

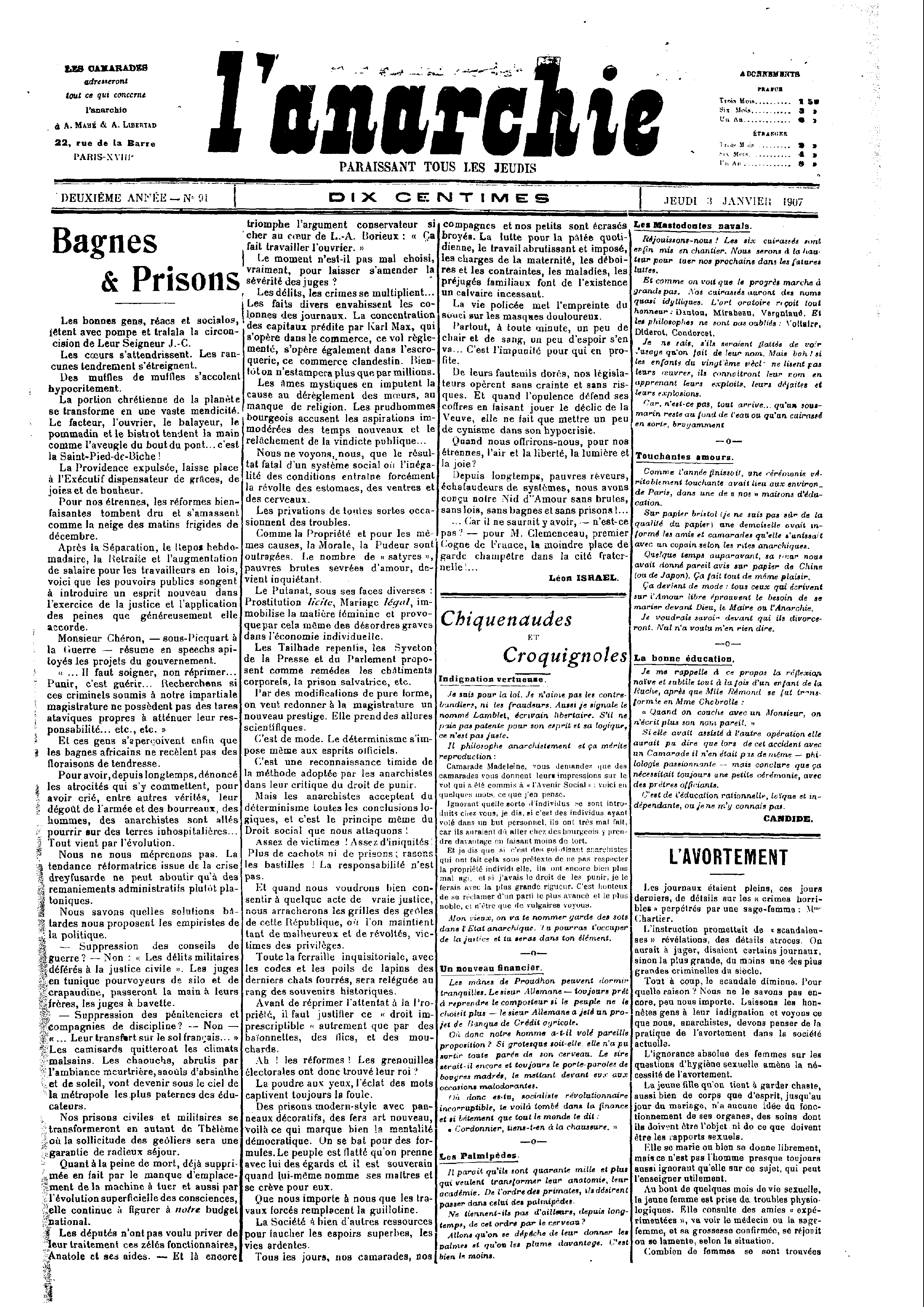
- L'Anarchie, 3 January 1907
- Frequency: weekly
- Founder: Albert Libertad
- First issue: April 13, 1905
- Final issue: July 22, 1914
- Language: French

L'Anarchie (French pronunciation: [lanaʁʃi], anarchy) was a French anarchist journal based in Paris and established in April 1905 by Albert Libertad. Along with Libertad, contributors to the journal included Émile Armand, André Lorulot, Émilie Lamotte, Raymond Callemin, and Victor Serge. Rirette Maîtrejean and Victor Kibaltchich, who initially advocated illegalism, changed their publishing policy in 1911 after the death of the founder.

484 editions were published between 13 April 1905 and 22 July 1914.

On 21 April 1926 Louis Louvet relaunched L'Anarchie, which appeared until 1929.

== Founding ==
L'Anarchie was founded by Albert Libertad in 1905, with the first issue appearing on April 13. Libertad was a more militant anarchist, urging individuals to rebel, instead of the more common idea of a social revolution. L'Anarchie was against Anarcho-syndicalism and the traditional anarchism of Kropotkin or Bakunin, believing in the act of rebelling as individuals rather than the utopian egalitarian society most Anarcho-Syndicalists fight for.

Émile Armand said in an interview that "[Libertad] knew of Stirner and Nietzsche. One was not concerned with a future society always promised and which never came; the economic and social point of view was put to the side. Individualism was a permanent struggle between the individual and their surroundings, the negation of authority, law and exploitation an its corollary, authority."
