= Thomas =

Thomas may refer to:

== People ==
- List of people with given name Thomas
- Thomas (given name)
- Thomas (surname)
- Saint Thomas (disambiguation)
- Thomas Aquinas (1225–1274), Italian Dominican friar, philosopher, and Doctor of the Church
- Thomas the Apostle
- Thomas (bishop of the East Angles) (fl. 640s–650s), medieval Bishop of the East Angles
- Thomas (Archdeacon of Barnstaple) (fl. 1203), Archdeacon of Barnstaple
- Thomas, Count of Perche (1195–1217), Count of Perche
- Thomas (bishop of Finland) (1248), first known Bishop of Finland
- Thomas, Earl of Mar (1330–1377), 14th-century Earl, Aberdeen, Scotland

== Geography ==
=== Places in the United States ===
- Thomas, Idaho
- Thomas, Illinois
- Thomas, Oklahoma
- Thomas, Oregon
- Thomas, South Dakota
- Thomas, Virginia
- Thomas, Washington
- Thomas, West Virginia
- Thomas County (disambiguation)
- Thomas Township (disambiguation)

=== Elsewhere ===
- Thomas Glacier (Greenland)

== Arts and entertainment ==
- Thomas (Burton novel), a 1969 novel by Hester Burton, published in the US under the title Beyond the Weir Bridge
- Thomas (Jarvis novel), 1995 novel in the Deptford Histories Trilogy by Robin Jarvis
- Thomas (opera), 1985 Finnish-language opera by Einojuhani Rautavaara
- Thomas the Tank Engine, a fictional anthropomorphic steam locomotive
  - Thomas & Friends, British television series
  - Thomas & Friends: All Engines Go, animated television series that acts as a reboot to Thomas & Friends
- "Thomas," a song from the 2000 album Mer de Noms by A Perfect Circle

== Companies and brands ==
- Thomas', a brand of English muffins and bagels in North America
- Thomas Built Buses, an American bus manufacturer
- Thomas Motor Company, a former US manufacturer of motorcycles and automobiles
- Thomas's of York, a pub in England
- Thomas & Betts, a designer and manufacturer of connectors and components for electrical and communication markets
- Thomas-Detroit (automobile), a former US automobile manufacturer
- Thomas's London Day Schools, a group of schools in England
- Thomas Bros. Maps, mapmaker founded in California, US, publisher of the Thomas Guide series

== Religion ==
- Gospel of Thomas, a New Testament-era apocryphon
- Infancy Gospel of Thomas, an infancy gospel
- Book of Thomas the Contender, a gnostic book discovered in the Nag Hammadi library
- Acts of Thomas, another gnostic text
- Apocalypse of Thomas, a Christian gnostic apocalypse

== Other uses ==
- Thomas algorithm, a numerical algorithm to solve a tridiagonal system of equations
- Thomas theorem, a theory of belief and their consequences
- THOMAS, the U.S. Library of Congress's first online database

== See also ==
- Thomais (disambiguation)
- Thomasine (disambiguation)
- Thomasson (disambiguation)
- Thomaston (disambiguation)
- Thomasville (disambiguation)
- Tom (disambiguation)
- Tomas (disambiguation)
- Tomás (disambiguation)
- Thomasos, a surname
- Tomašević, a surname
- Tommie, a given name
- Tommy (disambiguation)
- Tuma (disambiguation)
