= Tomi (name) =

Tomi is a common name. In Finnish, it is a variant of Thomas and primarily used as a masculine name. In Japan, it can be a feminine or masculine given name. Notable persons with that name include:

== Persons with the given name ==
- Tomi Adeloye (born 1996), English professional footballer
- Tomi Adeyemi (born 1993), American author
- Tomi Agape (born 1996), Nigerian Afro-fusion, neo-soul, and alternative R&B singer, and songwriter
- Tomi Ameobi (born 1988), English footballer
- Tomi Correa (born 1984), Spanish footballer
- Tomi Davies (born 1955), Nigerian British investor, speaker, author, entrepreneur, philanthropist and advisor to technology companies
- Tomi Favored (born 1987), Nigerian-American gospel artiste and songwriter
- Tomi Fujiyama (born 1941), Japanese country music singer-songwriter
- Tomi Hirvonen (born 1977), Finnish former professional ice hockey player
- Tomi Horvat (born 1999), Slovenian professional footballer
- Tomi Rae Hynie (born 1969), American singer
- Tomi Immonen (born 1966), Finnish politician
- Tomi Jalo (1958–2009), Finnish footballer
- Tomi Janežič, Slovenian theatre director and professor
- Tomi Joutsen (born 1975), Finnish musician
- Tomi Juric (born 1991), Australian footballer
- Tomi Kallio (born 1977), Finnish ice hockey player
- Tomi Kalliola (born 1979), Finnish musician
- Tomi Karhunen (born 1989), Finnish ice hockey player
- Tomi Kay Phillips, American academic administrator
- Tomi Koivusaari (born 1973), Finnish musician
- Tomi Kostadinov (born 1991), Bulgarian footballer
- Tomi Kult (born 2000) Finnish professional footballer
- Tomi Källarsson (born 1979) Finnish former professional ice hockey defenceman
- Tomi Körkkö (born 1991) Finnish professional ice hockey player
- Tomi Kōra (1896–1993) Japanese psychologist, peace activist, and politician
- Tomi Lahren (born 1992), American television and online video host
- Tomi Leivo (born 1989) Finnish ice hockey player
- Tomi Lotta (born 1976), Finnish strongman competitor
- Tomi Lämsä (born 1979) Finnish former professional ice hockey player
- Tomi Maanoja (born 1986), Finnish footballer
- Tomi Montefiori (born 2003) Argentine professional footballer
- Tomi Mäkelä (born 1964) Finnish musicologist, pianist and professor
- Tomi Mäki (born 1983), Finnish ice hockey player
- Tomi Nybäck (born 1985), Finnish chess and poker player
- Tomi Nyman (born 1983), Finnish football defender
- Tomi Odunsi (born 1987) Nigerian television actress, singer, and songwriter
- Tomi Okawa (born 1932) Japanaese former international table tennis player
- Tomi Pallassalo (born 1989), Finnish ice hockey player
- Tomi Pekkala (born 1988), Finnish ice hockey player
- Tomi Peltonen (born 1987) Finnish professional ice hockey player
- Tomi Petrescu (born 1986), Finnish footballer
- Tomi Petrović (born 1999) Croatian footballer
- Tomi Pettinen (born 1977), Finnish ice hockey player
- Tomi Pierucci (born 1983) Argentine entrepreneur
- Tomi Poikolainen (born 1961), Finnish archer
- Tomi Pöllänen (born 1978), Finnish ice hockey player
- Tomi Pulkkinen (born 1992), Finnish figure skater who represented Switzerland
- Tomi Putaansuu (born 1974), Finnish musician
- Tomi Rahula (born 1976), Estonian musician and football referee
- Tomi Räisänen (born 1976), Finnish composer
- Tomi Rantamäki (born 1968), Finnish curler from Espoo
- Tomi Rautio (born 1996), Finnish professional ice hockey goaltender
- Tomi Reichental (1935–2026), Slovak-born Irish Holocaust survivor and author
- Tomi Saarelma (born 1988), Finnish footballer
- Tomi Sallinen (born 1989), Finnish ice hockey player
- Tomi Shimomura (born 1980), Austrian-Japanese footballer
- Tomi Sovilj, Serbian musician
- Tomi Ståhlhammar (born 1988), Finnish ice hockey player
- Tomi Stefanovski (born 1971), Macedonian long-distance swimmer
- Tomi Strock, American politician
- Tomi Swick, Canadian singer-songwriter
- Tomi Taira (1928–2015), Japanese actress
- Tomi Tuominen (born 1971), Finnish former rally co-driver
- Tomi Tuuha (born 1989), Finnish artistic gymnast
- Tomi Ungerer (1931–2019), French illustrator and author
- Tomi Wilenius (born 1993), Finnish professional ice hockey player

Surname

- Félix Tomi (born 2000), French professional footballer
- Giovanni Tomi (born 1987), Italian footballer
- Nagi El-Tomi (born 1977), Libyan futsal player
- Vicente Ehate Tomi (born 1968), Equatoguinean politician
- Vojtěch Tomi (born 1994), Czech ice hockey forward

== Fictional characters ==
- Tomi Shishido, comic book character
- Tomi Kisaragi, one of the 13 main protagonists of the video game 13 Sentinels: Aegis Rim

== See also ==
- Tommi
- Tomislav
- Tommy (disambiguation)
- Tommie
