= Thomas (given name) =

Name list

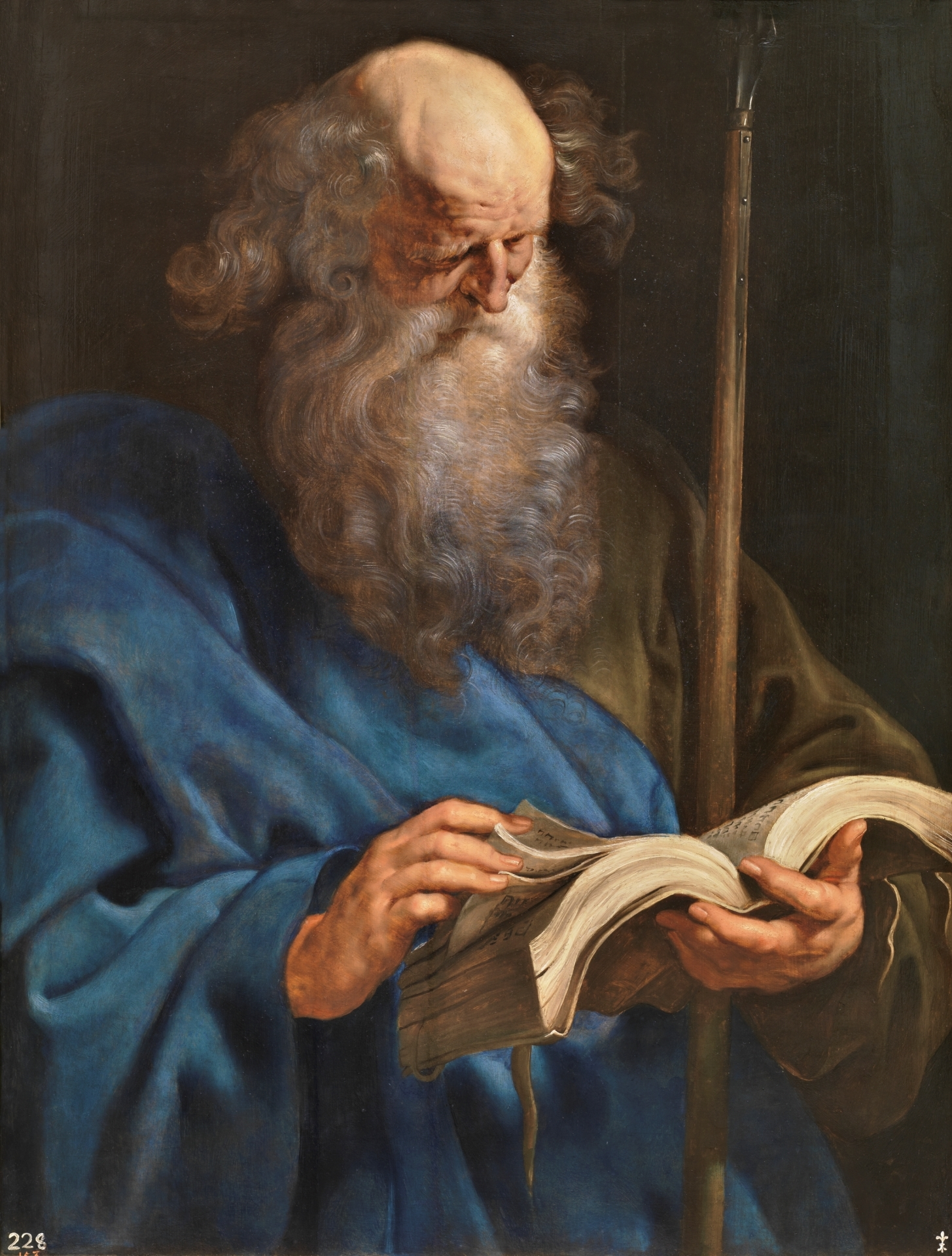
- 17th-century portrait of Thomas the Apostle by Peter Paul Rubens
- Pronunciation: /ˈtɒm.əs/ TOM-es; French: [tɔmɑ] German: [ˈtoːmas] Dutch: [ˈtoːmɑs]
- Gender: Male

Origin
- Origin: Aramaic; Hebrew; Greek
- Meaning: "twin"

Other names
- Nicknames: Tom, Tommy, Thom
- Derived: Θωμᾶς (Thōmâs) תאמא (Tawmɑʔ)
- Related names: Tomas, Thompson, Thomson, Tompkins, Tommie, Tomson, Tompson, Tomkinson, Tomsen, Thomasson, Thomassen, Thomas

Thomas is a male name of Aramaic or Hebrew origin. The English spelling Thomas is a transliteration through Latin Thomas, of the approximate Greek transliteration (Ancient Greek: Θωμᾶς, romanized: Thōmâs), from Imperial Aramaic: תאמא, romanized: Tawmɑʔ) or equivalently from Biblical Hebrew (Hebrew: תְּאוֹם, romanized: tə'óm), meaning 'twin'. Thomas is recorded in the Greek New Testament as the name of Thomas the Apostle (one of the twelve apostles of Jesus).

== Etymology ==
The masculine noun תאם (Tôm) occurs throughout Semitic languages, always meaning 'twin', for instance in Hebrew תְאוֹם ("teom") or in Arabic توأم ("tawam"). The name Thomas is thus a Greek transliteration (Θωμᾶς) of a Semitic epithet meaning "twin". While frequently attributed to the Aramaic word Te'oma, several scholars, reference works, and linguists argue for a direct Hebrew origin from the biblical noun te'om (תְּאוֹם). This perspective holds that the Greek spelling was derived straight from a native Hebrew nickname spoken by Judean Jews to preserve their unique cultural identity, a connection also noted in historical analyses by theologians such as Pope Benedict XVI.

== Popularity ==
Thomas was a popular name throughout medieval Europe. In Britain the name was rare prior to the Norman Conquest (11th century CE), but by the 13th and 14th centuries it had become common. In 2017 it ranked 13th in popularity in the United Kingdom with 3,246 babies given the name.

The Social Security Administration lists the name Thomas as the ninth most popular name in the United States over the past 100 years. In 2017 it ranked 48th in popularity with 7,131 babies given the name.

In Canada the name Thomas was the eighth most popular name for boys in 2022.

== In various languages ==
- Afrikaans: Thomas
- Albanian: Tomë
- Alemannic: Thömu, Thömus, Thömi
- Amharic: ቶማስ (Tomas)
- Arabic: توماس (Tūmās)
- Aragonese: Tomás
- Armenian: Թովմաս (Tʿovmas), Թովմա (Tʿovma), Թումաս (Tʿumas), Թումա (Tʿuma)
- Basque: Tomas
- Bavarian: Douma, Dammal, Dammerl
- Belarusian: Томас (Tomas), Tamas
- Breton: Tomaz
- Bulgarian: Тома́ (Tomá)
- Catalan: Tomàs
- Chinese: 汤姆 (Tāngmǔ), 托马斯 (Tuōmǎsī)
- Cornish: Tommas
- Croatian Tomislav, Toma
- Czech: Tomáš
- Danish: Thomas
- Dutch: Thomas, Tom
- English: Thomas, Tom, Tommy
- Estonian: Toomas
- Faroese: Tummas
- Finnish: Tuomas, Tommi, Tomi
- Flemish: Thom, Thomas
- French: Thomas
- Frisian: Tomas
- Friulian: Tomâs
- Galician: Tomé
- German: Thomas, Tomas, Tom, Tomi
- Georgian: თომა (Toma), თომას (Tomas)
- Greek: Θωμάς (Thomás)
- Hawaiian: Koma, Kamaki
- Hebrew: תאום (Ta'om), תאומא (Tomas)
- Hungarian: Tamás
- Icelandic: Tómas
- Indonesian: Tomas, Thomas, Tommy
- Irish: Tomás, Tomáisín
- Italian: Tommaso, Tomaso, Tom(m)asino
- Japanese: トーマス (Tōmasu), トム (Tomu)
- Korean: 도마 (Doma), 톰 (Tom)
- Latin: Thōmās
- Latvian: Tomass, Tomas, Toms
- Lithuanian: Tomas, Tamošius
- Lombard: Tomàs
- Macedonian: Тома (Toma)
- Maltese: Tumas
- Malayalam: Thoma
- Manchu: ᡨᠣᠮᠠ（Toma）
- Manx: Thomaase
- Maori: Tāmati
- Meitei (officially called Manipuri): ꯊꯣꯃꯁ (Thōmas), ꯊꯣꯃꯥꯁ (Thōmās)
- Norwegian: Thomas, Tomas
- Occitan: Tomàs
- Persian: توما (Tumâ), توماس (Tumâs)
- Polish: Tomasz
- Portuguese: Tomé, Tomás
- Romanian: Toma
- Romansh: Tumasch
- Russian: Томас (Tomas), Фома (Foma)
- Sardinian: Tommasu
- Scottish Gaelic: Tòmas, Tàmhas
- Serbian Toma, Tomi
- Serbo-Croatian: Тома/Toma, Томаш/Tomaš
- Sicilian: Tumasi
- Slovak: Tomáš, Thomas
- Slovene: Tomaž
- Spanish: Tomás
- Swedish: Thomas, Tomas
- Tamil: தாமஸ் (Tāmas), தோமா (Tōmā)
- Telugu: థామస్ (Thāmas)
- Tigrinya: ቶማስ (Tomas)
- Syriac: ܬܐܘܡܐ (Toma)
- Turkish: Tomas
- Ukrainian: Хома (Homa or Khoma)
- Vietnamese: Tâm (Tom)
- Walloon: Toumas
- Welsh: Tomos, Twm

== See also ==
- Template:Thomas-surname—Lists surnames derived from the given name Thomas and its variants
- List of people with given name Thomas
- Thomas (disambiguation)
- Thomasina or Thomasine—the feminine form of Thomas
- Tom (disambiguation)
- Toma (name)
- Tomi—A Finnish masculine name, also used as a feminine name elsewhere
- Tommy/Tommie—Both are a nickname or shortened form of Thomas, and are sometimes used as a feminine form of Thomas
- Yama, a Hindu deity whose name in Sanskrit also means 'twin'
