= Tomas =

Tomas may refer to:

== People ==
- Tomás (given name), a Spanish, Portuguese, and Gaelic given name
- Tomas (given name), a Swedish, Dutch, and Lithuanian given name
- Tomáš, a Czech and Slovak given name
- Tomàs, a Catalan given name and surname
- Tomas (surname), a French and Croatian surname
- Tomás (surname), a Spanish and Portuguese surname
- Tomaš (surname), a Croatian surname
- Tomas., taxonomic author abbreviation of Ruggero Tomaselli (1920–1982), Italian botanist

== Places ==
- Tomaš, Croatia, a village near Bjelovar
- Tomaș River, a tributary of the Gârbăul Mare River in Romania
- Tomas District, Peru

== Other uses ==
- Tropical Storm Tomas (disambiguation), numerous storms
- Tomas (novel), 2009 novel by James Palumbo
- Convento de Santo Tomás (Madrid)

== See also ==
- Thomas (disambiguation)
- Tom (disambiguation)
