= Tomàs =

Tomàs is both a Catalan masculine given name and a surname, the Catalan form of Thomas. Notable people with the name include:

== Given name ==
- Tomàs Buxó (1882–1962), Spanish composer
- Tomàs Caylà i Grau (1895–1936), Spanish publisher and Carlist politician
- Tomàs Garcés (1901–1993), Catalan poet and lawyer
- Tomàs-Llorenç Guarino Sabaté (born 1999), Spanish figure skater
- Tomàs Milans i Godayol (1672–1742), Catalan composer
- Tomàs Molina (born 1963), Catalan meteorologist and TV presenter
- Tomàs Moragas (1837–1906), Spanish painter
- H. Tomàs Padilla, Puerto Rico-born city commissioner of Pontiac, Michigan
- Tomàs Padró (1840–1877), Catalan painter, graphic artist and illustrator
- Tomàs Rosés, banker and president of FC Barcelona (1929–1930)

== Surname ==
- Albert Tomàs (born 1970), Spanish football player
- Francesc Tomàs Oliver (1850–1903), Spanish anarchist
- Joan Tomàs (footballer) (born 1985), Spanish football player
- Joan Tomàs (sport shooter) (born 1951), Andorran sport shooter
- Josep Tomàs i Piera (1900–1976), Catalan lawyer and politician
- Paquita Tomàs (1943–2025), Spanish chef and television presenter
- Pere Tomàs (born 1989), Spanish basketball player

== See also ==
- Sant Tomàs, a village on the south coast of Menorca
