= Tomm =

Tomm or TOMM may refer to:

- Train of Many Metals, New York Transit Museum nostalgia train
- Test of Memory Malingering, visual memory recognition test
- ACM Transactions on Multimedia Computing, Communications, and Applications, quarterly scientific journal
- Translocase of the outer mitochondrial membrane, protein-encoding human genes
  - TOMM20
  - TOMM22
  - TOMM34
  - TOMM40
  - TOMM40L
  - TOMM70A

== People ==
- Tomm Coker (born 1972), American comic book artist and film director/writer
- Tomm Kristiansen (born 1950), Norwegian author and journalist
- Tomm Moore (born 1977), Irish filmmaker, animator, illustrator and comics artist
- Tomm Murstad (1915–2001), Norwegian skier, coach and business man
- Tomm Polos (born 1988), American actor, humorist and writer
- Tomm Warneke (born 1961), American professional tennis player
- Tomm., taxonomic author abbreviation of Muzio Tommasini (1794–1879), Austrian botanist

== See also ==
- Tom (disambiguation)
- Tommy (disambiguation)
