= Tom =

Tom or TOM may refer to:

- Tom (given name), including a list of people and fictional characters with the name
- Tom (surname)

== Arts and entertainment ==
=== Film and television ===
- Tom (1973 film), or The Bad Bunch, a blaxploitation film
- Tom (2002 film), a documentary film
- Tom (American TV series), 1994
- Tom (Spanish TV series), 2003

=== Music ===
- Tom, a 1970 album by Tom Jones
- Tom drum, a musical drum with no snares
- Tom (Ethiopian instrument), a plucked lamellophone thumb piano
- Tune-o-matic, a guitar bridge design

== Places ==
- Tom, Oklahoma, US
- Tom (Amur Oblast), a river in Russia
- Tom (river), in Russia, a right tributary of the Ob

== Science and technology ==
- A male cat
- A male wild turkey
- Tom (pattern matching language), a programming language
- TOM (psychedelic), a hallucinogen
- Text Object Model, a Microsoft Windows programming interface
- Theory of mind (ToM), in psychology
- Translocase of the outer membrane, a complex of proteins

== Transportation ==
- Tom (ship), the name of several ships
- TUI Airways, ICAO airline code TOM
- Tottenham Hale station, London, England, station code TOM

== Other uses ==
- The Old Market, Hove, England, a multi-arts venue
- Tom (gender identity), a gender identity in Thailand
- TOM (mascot), of the University of Memphis sports teams
- Tom (Paralympic mascot), of the 2016 Summer Paralympics
- TOM Group, a Hong Kong media company
- TOM Online, a Chinese mobile internet company
- Overseas territory (France) (territoire d'outre-mer, TOM)
- Troops Out Movement, an Irish republican organisation

== See also ==
- Toms (disambiguation)
- Tom tom (disambiguation)
- Tom Thumb (disambiguation)
- Tomás (disambiguation)
- Tomm (disambiguation)
- Tommy (disambiguation)
- Peeping Tom (disambiguation)
- Thomas (disambiguation)
