= Tuma =

Tuma may refer to:

== Places ==
- Bab Tuma (Saint Thomas's Gate), borough of Damascus
- Tuma-La Dalia, municipality in the Matagalpa department of Nicaragua
- Tuma, a minor island in the Arnarvon Islands
- Tuma, Russia, name of several inhabited localities in Russia

== People ==
- Tůma (feminine Tůmová), Czech surname with multiple holders
- Adolf Tuma (born 1956), Austrian painter
- Hama Tuma (born 1950), Ethiopian poet
- Romeu Tuma (1931–2010), Brazilian politician
- Scott Tuma, American musician

== Other ==
- Tuma MTE 224 VA, Swiss machine pistol
- Millettia peguensis or Tuma, a legume tree species
- Tuma, a fictional character in the Bionicle universe
- Tuma or Toma, different varieties of cheese in Italy

== See also ==
- Tumah
