= Tomi =

Tomi may refer to:

- Constanța, a city in Romania, also known as Tomis or Tomi
- Tomi, Okayama, a village in Japan
- Tōmi, Nagano, a city in Japan
- Tomi (name), a given name (including a list of people with the name)
- Tomi (film), a 1936 Hungarian drama film
- Tomi Village, a fictional Okinawan village that was the primary setting of the 1986 American motion picture The Karate Kid Part II

== See also ==
- Tomie
