= St. Thomas Township =

St. Thomas Township or Saint Thomas Township may refer to the following places in the United States:

- St. Thomas Township, Pembina County, North Dakota
- St. Thomas Township, Pennsylvania

See also

- Thomas Township (disambiguation)
