= Francisco Javier García Fajer =

Spanish composer

Francisco Javier García Fajer El Españoleto (Nalda, Logroño 2 December 1730 – Zaragoza 1809) was a Spanish composer of the Italianate galante school.

He studied at the choir school at Zaragoza Cathedral. As a young man he moved to Italy, where he was chapelmaster of the see of Terni 1754-56 and gained his Italian epithet Lo Spagnoletto, which he retained even back in Spain as El Españoleto.

The Italian musical environment during the 1750s was characterised by composers on the threshold between galante and early classical such as Niccolò Jommelli and Giovanni Battista Pergolesi.

García Fajer returned home as maestro de capilla of la Seo in Zaragoza 1756 till his death during the French siege of Zaragoza in 1809. As part of his Italianate reforms the Spanish villancico was supplanted by the Latin responsory.

García Fajer was out of favour for many years in Spain due to his promotion of Italianate musical idiom, however in recent years he has been rehabilitated and taken on his own merits as a galante composer. A conference dedicated to rehabilitation of his reputation and work was held at the University of La Rioja, Spain, in April 2007.

== Works ==
- Operas – Rome 1754, 1756
- Pompeo magno in Armenia libretto by Anastasio Guidi.
- Oratorios – Tobias 1752
- Intermezzi – La pupilla. La finta schiava.
- Masses
- Psalms

== Discography ==
- Oficio de Difuntos – Latin psalm settings. La Grande Chapelle. Schola Antiqua dir. Albert Recasens. Lauda.
- Latin settings of the Seven words on the cross, Pater dimitte illis etc. – (modern Catalan title: Les set paraules de Crist a la creu) with motets by Joan Rossell and Melcior Juncà. Young Hee Kim (soprano), Montserrat Pi (contralto), Orquestra de Cambra Catalana dir. Joan Pàmies. La mà de Guido.
