= Lo Spagnoletto =

Lo Spagnoletto (Italian: "The Little Spaniard") was the nickname of:

- Jusepe de Ribera (1591–1652), Spanish painter and printmaker
- Francisco Javier García Fajer (1730–1809), Spanish composer
