= Tochovice =

- Municipality
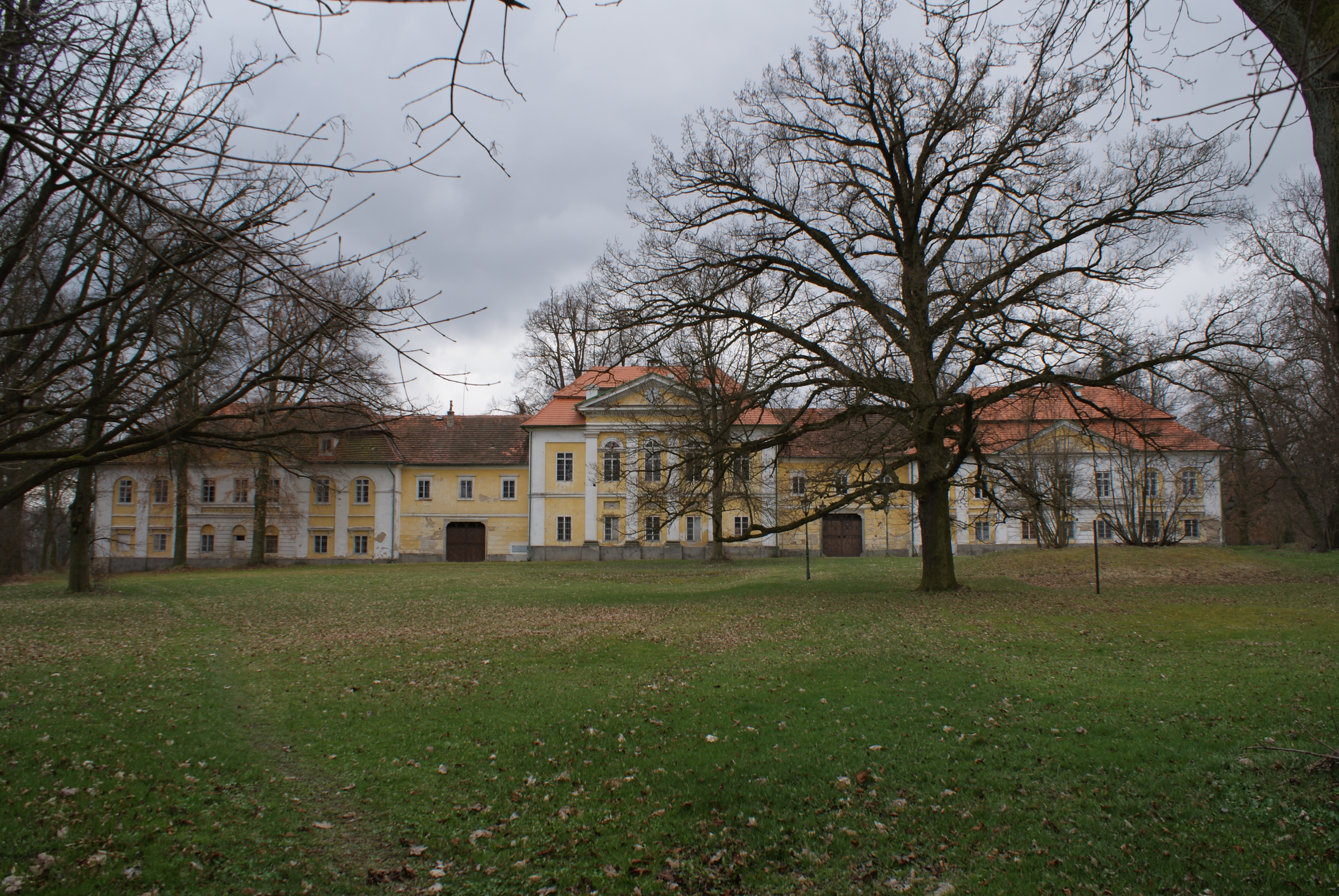
- Tochovice Castle

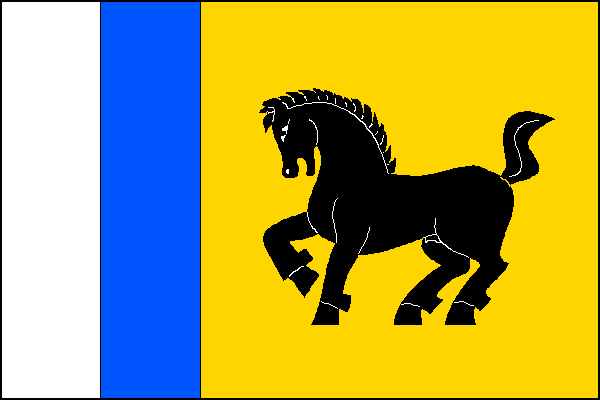
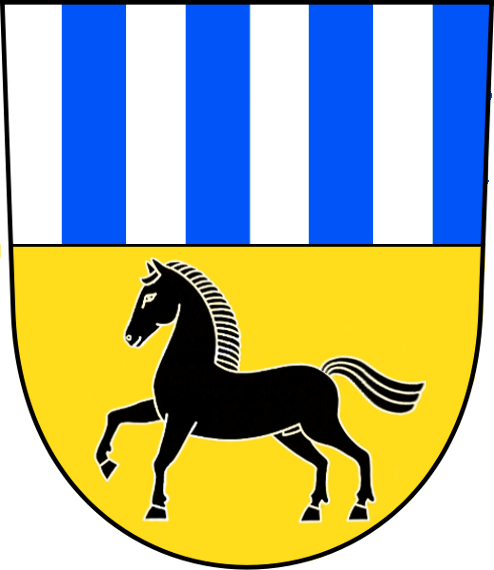
- Flag Coat of arms

- Location in the Czech Republic
- Coordinates: 49°35′44″N 13°59′33″E
- Country: Czech Republic
- Region: Central Bohemian
- District: Příbram
- First mentioned: 1305

Area
  - Total: 11.86 km^{2} (4.58 sq mi)
- Elevation: 487 m (1,598 ft)

Population (2026-01-01)
  - Total: 670
  - Density: 56/km^{2} (150/sq mi)
- Time zone: UTC+1 (CET)
  - Summer (DST): UTC+2 (CEST)
- Postal code: 262 81
- Website: www.tochovice.cz

Tochovice is a municipality and village in Příbram District in the Central Bohemian Region of the Czech Republic. It has about 700 inhabitants.

== Administrative division ==
Tochovice consists of two municipal parts (in brackets population according to the 2021 census):

- Tochovice (536)
- Hořejany (79)

== Etymology ==
The name is derived from the personal name Toch, meaning "the village of Toch's people". Toch was probably a shortened form of Tomáš or Tobiáš.

== Geography ==
Tochovice is located about 8 kilometres (5 mi) south of Příbram and 54 km (34 mi) southwest of Prague. It lies in the Benešov Uplands. The highest point is at 528 m (1,732 ft) above sea level. There are several fishponds in the municipal territory, the largest of which is Zákostelecký rybník.

== History ==
The first written mention of Tochovice is from 1305, when King Wenceslaus II donated the village to the Ostrov Monastery in Davle.

== Demographics ==
Historical population

Year	Pop.	±%
1869	866	—
1880	893	+3.1%
1890	893	+0.0%
1900	914	+2.4%
1910	885	−3.2%

Year	Pop.	±%
1921	863	−2.5%
1930	830	−3.8%
1950	636	−23.4%
1961	581	−8.6%
1970	571	−1.7%

Year	Pop.	±%
1980	607	+6.3%
1991	595	−2.0%
2001	565	−5.0%
2011	629	+11.3%
2021	615	−2.2%

Source: Censuses

== Transport ==
Tochovice is located on the railway line Beroun–Strakonice via Příbram. The municipality is served by two train stations.

== Sport ==
There is a racecourse for horse racing in Tochovice. It was founded in 1964 and the track is 1,420 m (4,660 ft) long.

== Sights ==
The main landmark of Tochovice is the Tochovice Castle. It was originally a Renaissance fortress, rebuilt into the late Baroque castle. The castle was then extended and rebuilt in the early Neoclassical style in 1821–1823. The castle is surrounded by a park.
