= Tamati =

Tamati or Tāmati is both a surname and a given name. It is a Māori transliteration of the name Thomas. Notable people with the name include:

== Given name ==
- Tamati Clarke (born 1990), New Zealand cricketer
- Tāmati Coffey (born 1979), New Zealand politician
- Tamati Ellison (born 1983), New Zealand rugby player
- Tamati Erihana (1867–1904), New Zealand rugby union player and lawyer
- Tamati Hone Oraukawa (fl.1848–1869), New Zealand tribal leader
- Tamati Ioane (born 1997), Australian rugby union player
- Tamati Ngakaho (died 1904), New Zealand Ngāti Porou carver
- Tāmati Ngāpora (died 1885), New Zealand Waikato Māori leader
- Tamati Reedy (1936–2026), New Zealand Māori academic and public servant
- Tamati Tua (born 1997), New Zealand rugby player
- Tāmati Wāka Nene (1780s–1871), Māori chief
- Tamati Williams (born 1984), New Zealand footballer

== Surname ==
- Arihia Ngata (1879–1929), Ngāti Porou leader; born Arihia Tāmati
- Fata Tamati (fl.1948–1951), Western Samoan chief and politician
- Howie Tamati (born 1953), New Zealand international rugby league footballer and coach
- Jai Tamati (born 2005), New Zealand rugby union player
- Kevin Tamati (born 1953), New Zealand international rugby league footballer and coach
- Megan Tamati-Quennell, New Zealand art curator
- Te Matenga Tamati (?–1914?), New Zealand religious leader, prophet, and healer
