= Pontiac Hispanic History Preservation Project =

Community project

The Pontiac Hispanic History Project is the result of a committee's effort to gather and catalog the Latino history of the city of Pontiac, Michigan. The committee was begun by Martha Padilla and is co-chaired by her and Willie Martinez.

The project actively documents and researches the earliest Puerto Rican and Mexican immigrants that came to Pontiac in the 1940s and 1920s respectively. They maintain a growing library of newspaper clippings, personal photographs, and audio and video recordings, as well as acquisitions from the defunct Pontiac Latin Affairs Office. Plans encompass cataloging the archives of the Azteca Boxing Center, a local boxing training facility.

== Origins ==
Martha says she was prompted to begin the project after trying to organize her husband's old papers. Hector Padilla, a native Puerto Rican, had passed on and she felt that the history contained in papers from his tenure as the first Latino city commissioner, as well as lobbying for migrant worker conditions and his efforts in forming the Hispanic Congressional Caucus, were important to the community and needed to be put somewhere.

The effort of Martha was expanded as she realized that others in the Latino community deserve recognition. Fear that the records of who has done what would be lost spurred Willie Martinez and others to join Padilla in gathering stories and history of the Pontiac Latino community at large.

== Location ==
The findings will be presented to the Burton Historical Collection at the Detroit Public Library on 08 Oct. 2008. Emphasis was given to making sure any findings were collected and presented to Burton Collection rather than being "...stored in someone's garage or basement".
