= Tomàs Molina =

Catalan meteorologist and TV presenter (1963-)

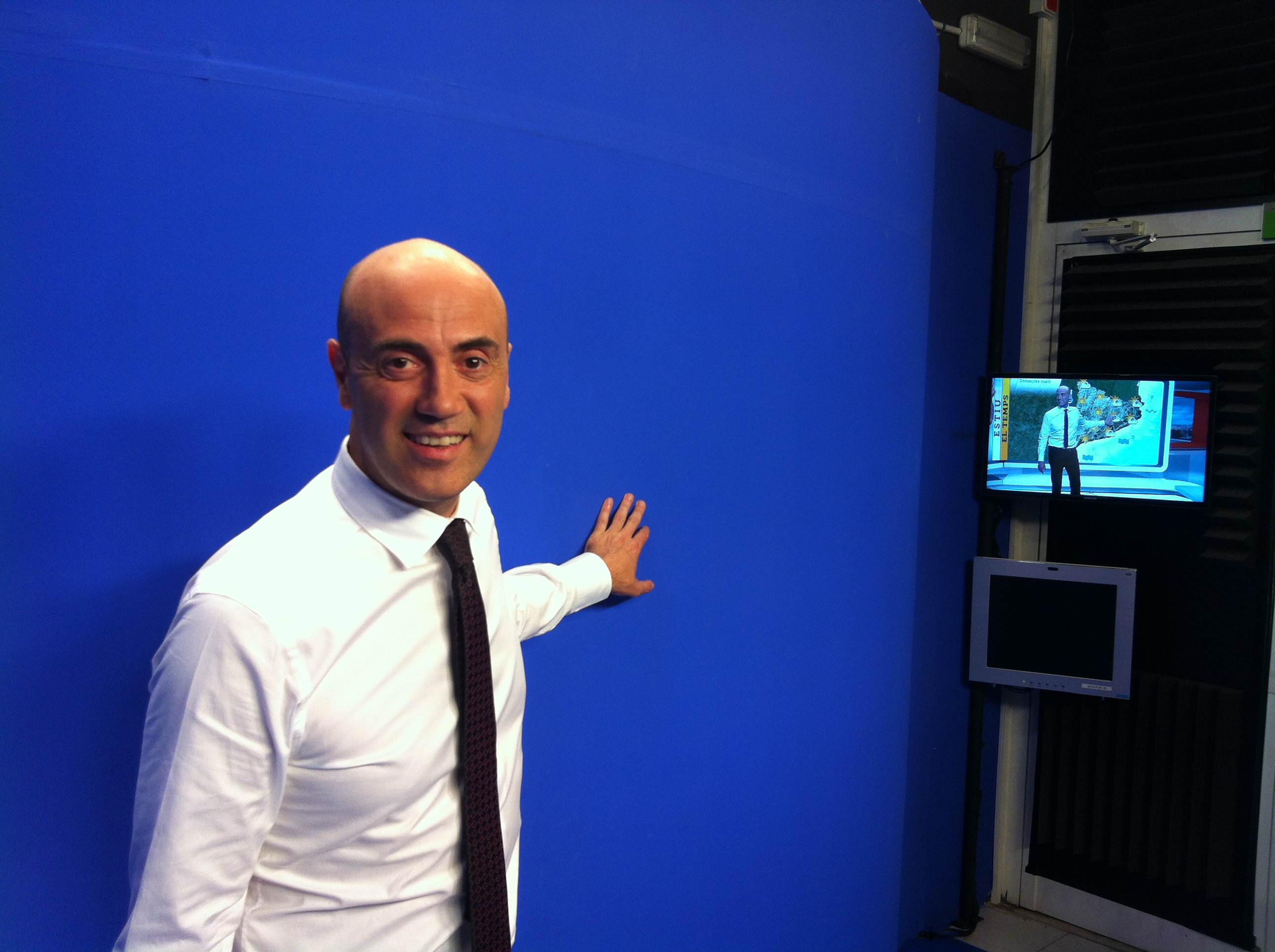
- Molina in 2014
- Born: Tomàs Manel Molina i Bosch; September 26, 1963 (age 62); Badalona, Catalonia
- Education: University of Barcelona
- Occupations: Meteorologist, TV presenter, weather broadcaster
- Years active: 1987–
- Employer: Televisió de Catalunya
- Known for: Being Catalonia's weather presenter
- Television: El Temps
- Political party: Republican Left of Catalonia
- Movement: Climate movement
- Board member of: International Association of Broadcast Meteorology, Meteorological Service of Catalonia
- Spouse: Maria Antònia Grifols (married 1991–)
- Children: 3

Tomàs Molina i Bosch (born September 26, 1963) is a Catalan meteorologist and TV presenter. He's been working as the Televisió de Catalunya weather broadcaster for over 30 years and has directed its meteorological department since 1987. He's been described as "Catalonia's most beloved weather man".

== Education and career ==
Molina studied physical sciences at the University of Barcelona, specializing in geoscience and cosmology before receiving a doctorate in communication. Since 2000, he has been an associate professor at the university, teaching weather forecasting and meteorology.

Molina is also a vice presidents of the board of the International Association of Broadcast Meteorology, as well as one of the board directors of the Meteorological Service of Catalonia and a European Climate Pact Ambassador. He has published several meteorology-themed books, including Contes del temps: Una història per a cada mes de l’any (lit. 'Stories about the Weather: One for Every Month of the Year'), Meteocuriositats: 50 secrets per entendre el temps (lit. 'Meteofacts: 50 Untold Secrets About the Weather'), and El gran llibre del planeta (lit. 'The Definitive Guide to the Planet').

Molina works as a TV presenter for Televisió de Catalunya, primarily hosting the TV3 program El Temps (lit. 'The Weather'). He has been the director of the channel's meteorological department since 1987. Even so, he has also worked as a radio presenter.

In 2024, he announced he would be a candidate for the European Parliament election representing the Republican Left of Catalonia, which would contest the elections alongside EH Bildu, the Galician Nationalist Bloc, and Ara Més in a coalition named Ara Repúbliques. He was selected based on his prominence in the climate movement in Catalonia. Following the results, which granted Ara Repúbliques just three MEPs, the coalition decided to split the position between him and Ana Miranda Paz, who was third overall running for the Galician Nationalist Bloc. Molina is expected to work as a MEP between 2027 and 2029.

== Personal life ==
Molina has been married to physician Maria Antònia Grífols since 1991. They have three children: Núria, Pol and Joan.

Molina is Catholic.
