= Thomasos =

Thomasos is a surname. Notable people with the surname include:

- Arnold Thomasos, Trinidad and Tobago politician
- Denyse Thomasos, Trinidadian-Canadian painter
- Gloria Thomasos-Pollard, Trinidad and Tobago politician

== See also ==
- Thomas (disambiguation)
