= Tom (ship) =

Several vessels have been named Tom:

- Tom (1771 ship) was launched in 1771 in Britain. Between 1778 and 1792 she was a West Indiaman, trading between Lancaster and Jamaica, St Lucia, and Grenada. New owners in 1792 sailed Tom as a slave ship in the triangular trade in enslaved people. She was condemned in 1794 at Barbados after having delivered the captives she had acquired in the Cameroons.
- Tom (1792 ship) (or Toms) was launched in 1780 in America, possibly under another name. She first appeared in British records in 1792. From 1792 Tom participated as a slave ship in the triangular trade in enslaved people. She made two complete voyages from Liverpool. French frigates captured her in 1794 before she could acquire any slaves.
- Tom (1798 ship) was launched at Whitby in 1798 as a West Indiaman. New owners in 1802 resulted in Tom becoming a whaler in the southern whale fishery. The Spanish seized her in 1805 off Peru.
