= Thomasine =

Thomasine may refer to:

- Thomasine (given name), an English feminine given name
- Thomasine Church, a community of Christians from Kerala, India
- Thomasines, early Christian Gnostic or a mysticist sect
- Thomasine Rite, used in churches descended from the Church of the East

== See also ==
- Thomas (disambiguation)
