= Möhlin-Riburg F.C. =

Home colours

Möhlin-Riburg F.C. is a football club that played in Swiss football league system, based in Möhlin, Switzerland. The club was formed in 1933. The current slogan of the club is: "We like to play football!".

Some notable former players are Ivan Rakitić, from 1992 to 1995, and Tomi Saarelma who signed for the club in 2023.
