= Josep Carcoler =

Catalan composer

Josep Carcoler (1698–1776) was a Catalan composer. Some of his works are preserved in Latin American manuscripts.

== Works, editions, recordings ==
- Stabat Mater. With works by Francisco Valls, Tomàs Milans Zarzuela al Santísimo, Antonio Literes, Joan Rossell. Mapa Harmónico dir. Francesc Bonastre. Columna Musica 2005.
