= Ivan Rakitić =

Croatian footballer (born 1988)

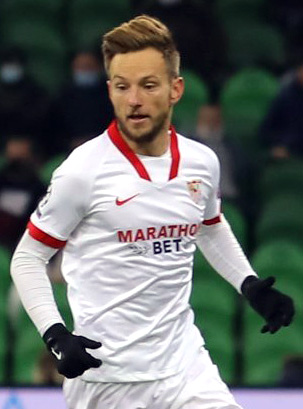
- Rakitić playing for Sevilla in 2020

Personal information
- Full name: Ivan Rakitić
- Date of birth: 10 March 1988 (age 38)
- Place of birth: Rheinfelden, Switzerland
- Height: 1.84 m (6 ft 0 in)
- Position: Midfielder

Youth career
- 1992–1995: Möhlin-Riburg
- 1995–2005: FC Basel

Senior career*
Years	Team	Apps	(Gls)
2004	Nordstern Basel	0	(0)
2005–2006	FC Basel II	21	(9)
2005–2007	FC Basel	34	(11)
2007–2011	Schalke 04	97	(12)
2011–2014	Sevilla	117	(25)
2014–2020	Barcelona	200	(25)
2020–2024	Sevilla	121	(11)
2024	Al-Shabab	8	(1)
2024–2025	Hajduk Split	35	(2)
Total		633	(96)

International career
2003–2004	Switzerland U16	10	(6)
2004–2005	Switzerland U17	12	(7)
2005–2006	Switzerland U19	16	(6)
2006–2007	Switzerland U21	4	(1)
2009–2010	Croatia U21	4	(2)
2007–2019	Croatia	106	(15)
Medal record
Men's football
Representing Croatia
FIFA World Cup
Runner-up	2018 Russia
- * Club domestic league appearances and goals

Ivan Rakitić (Croatian pronunciation: [ǐʋan rǎkititɕ]; born 10 March 1988) is a former professional footballer who played as a midfielder. He currently serves as a technical director for Croatian Football League club Hajduk Split.

Rakitić started his professional career at Basel and spent two seasons with them before he was signed by Schalke 04. After spending three-and-a-half seasons in the Bundesliga, he was signed by Sevilla in January 2011. Two years later, Rakitić was confirmed as the club captain and captained the team to UEFA Europa League triumph. In June 2014, Barcelona and Sevilla reached an agreement on the transfer of Rakitić. In his first season with Barça, he won the treble of La Liga, Copa del Rey and UEFA Champions League. He scored the first goal of the 2015 Champions League final and became the first player ever to win the Champions League a year after winning the Europa League while playing for two clubs. After appearing in 310 games and winning ten more trophies with Barcelona, Rakitić returned to Sevilla in 2020 and won the Europa League again in the 2023 UEFA Europa League final.

Born in Switzerland to Croatian parents from Yugoslavia, Rakitić played for Switzerland at youth level, but decided to represent Croatia at senior level. He made his debut for the Croatia national team in 2007 and has since represented the country at UEFA Euro 2008, 2012 and 2016, and the 2014 and 2018 FIFA World Cup, reaching the final of the latter. He retired from international duty in September 2020, having made 106 appearances. At the time of his retirement, he was the fourth most-capped player in the history of Croatia and is seen as one of the country's greatest ever players.

Including youth internationals, he has made over 1,000 appearances in his career.

== Early life ==
Rakitić was born in Rheinfelden in the Swiss canton of Aargau to Croat parents. His father Luka Rakitić is a Šokac from Sikirevci in Croatia, while his mother Kata (née Papić) is a Bosnian Croat from Ponijevo near Žepče. He grew up in Möhlin, canton of Aargau. He has a brother, Dejan, and a sister, Nikol. Rakitić has a tattoo bearing his brother's name on his right arm. Rakitić spent his childhood and early career in Switzerland. His father and older brother were also footballers. At age 16, his potential was noticed by top European scouts, and went for trials with clubs such as Arsenal, but he and his family decided to stay at Basel to allow him to play more regularly in a smaller league instead.

== Club career ==
=== Basel ===
After spending some short time in the youth teams, Rakitić went on to make his first-team debut for Basel on 29 September 2005 during the UEFA Cup away match at Široki Brijeg. He made his first Swiss Super League appearance on 15 April 2006 in Basel's away match against Neuchâtel Xamax. Although these two matches were the only ones he played during his first professional season with Basel, he went on to establish himself as a regular contributor in his second season, scoring 11 goals in 33 Super League appearances. Also making nine UEFA cup appearances during this time, he was named the best young player of the 2006–07 Super League season along with receiving the Swiss Goal of the Year award for an impressive goal he scored against St. Gallen on 22 October 2006.

=== Schalke 04 ===
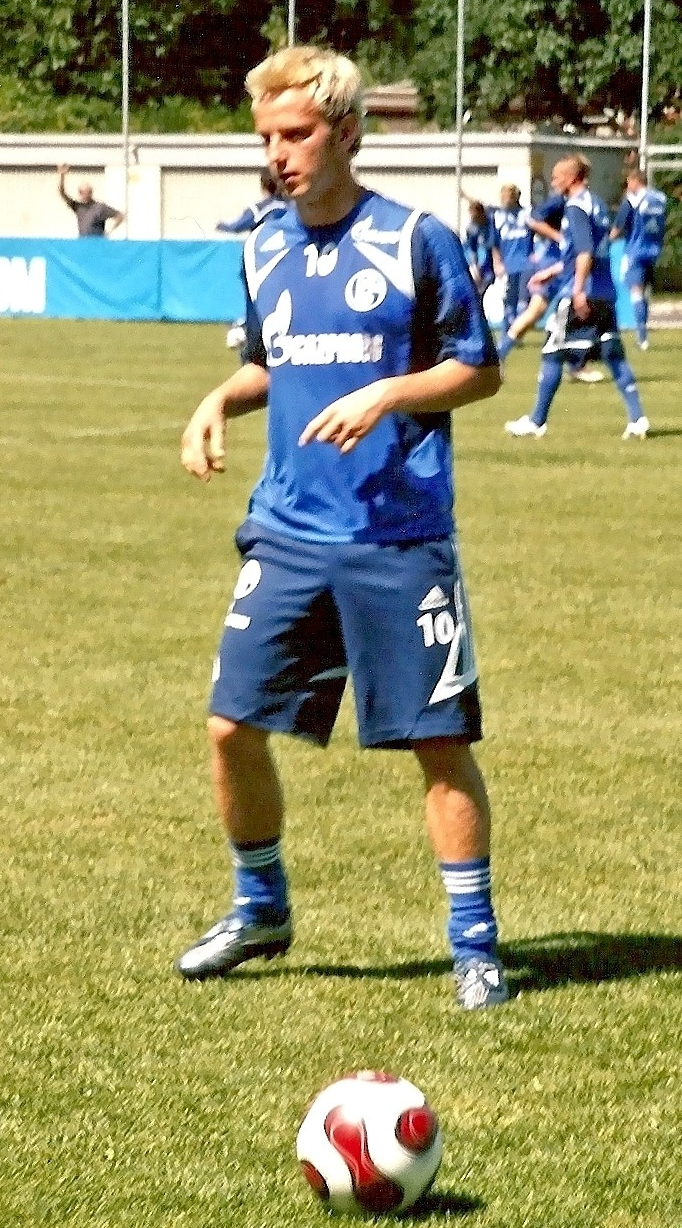
Rakitić with Schalke 04 in 2008

After an impressive showing as a teenager, Rakitić was again sought by large European clubs. Subject to such, he was eventually signed by German side Schalke 04 on 22 June 2007, for €5 million.

Rakitić made his debut for Schalke on 21 July 2007 in the Premiere Ligapokal fixture against Karlsruher SC and eventually appeared in the remaining two matches as Schalke finished as league runners-up. On 5 August 2007, Rakitić scored his first competitive goal for his new club in their 0–9 away win over Eintracht Trier in the first round of the DFB-Pokal.

On 10 August 2007, the new Bundesliga season was commenced with a clash between champions VfB Stuttgart and Schalke. Rakitić came on as a second-half substitute and scored his first Bundesliga goal within just seven minutes on the field as his side played out a 2–2 draw. On 15 September 2007, he managed to make impressions again by scoring the only goal for Schalke in their 1–1 away draw at Bayern Munich. Three days later, Rakitić made his UEFA Champions League debut in the 0–1 home defeat to Valencia. He then went on to make a total of seven appearances in the 2007–08 Champions League season, including a strong and very impressive midfield role in Schalke's home fixture against Chelsea in the group stage. He and former teammate Mladen Krstajić were temporarily cut from the squad the night before Schalke's next fixture against Rosenborg due to being caught skipping training and taking part in a late-night partying. Helping his side prevail in the penalty shootout against Porto to reach the quarter-finals for the first time, Rakitić had to miss both the fixtures of such against Chelsea due to an ankle injury sustained in training. He was kept out of action for a month as Schalke were eliminated from the tournament without him.

Shortly upon his returning from injury, Rakitić discovered top form as he scored a goal and assisted another two in the vital 0–3 victory at VfL Bochum, which made sure Schalke finished at least third in league table and secured a place in the next Champions League. He continued such form in the next fixture against Eintracht Frankfurt, assisting Mladen Krstajić for the only goal of the match to conclude with Schalke a positive home season. In total, he finished his first Bundesliga season with 3 goals and 10 assists in 29 appearances. In the subsequent season, Rakitić played in Schalke's 3–0 victory over Hannover 96, assisting two goals in the opening Bundesliga fixture.

=== Sevilla ===
==== 2010–11 season ====
On 28 January 2011, Rakitić signed a four-and-a-half-year contract with Spanish La Liga club Sevilla for a transfer fee of €2.5 million. Upon his arrival, Rakitić was immediately included in the starting XI of the team, making his debut on 6 February 2011 against Málaga. In next game, against Racing de Santander, he scored an own-goal but managed to get back on track and scored his first goal for Sevilla in the match against Hércules in the next matchday. Due to a fractured foot, Rakitić was forced to miss the last four La Liga fixtures. He scored five goals in his first half-season with Sevilla in 2010–11, starting in all 13 matches after his arrival and before the foot injury.

==== 2011–12 season ====
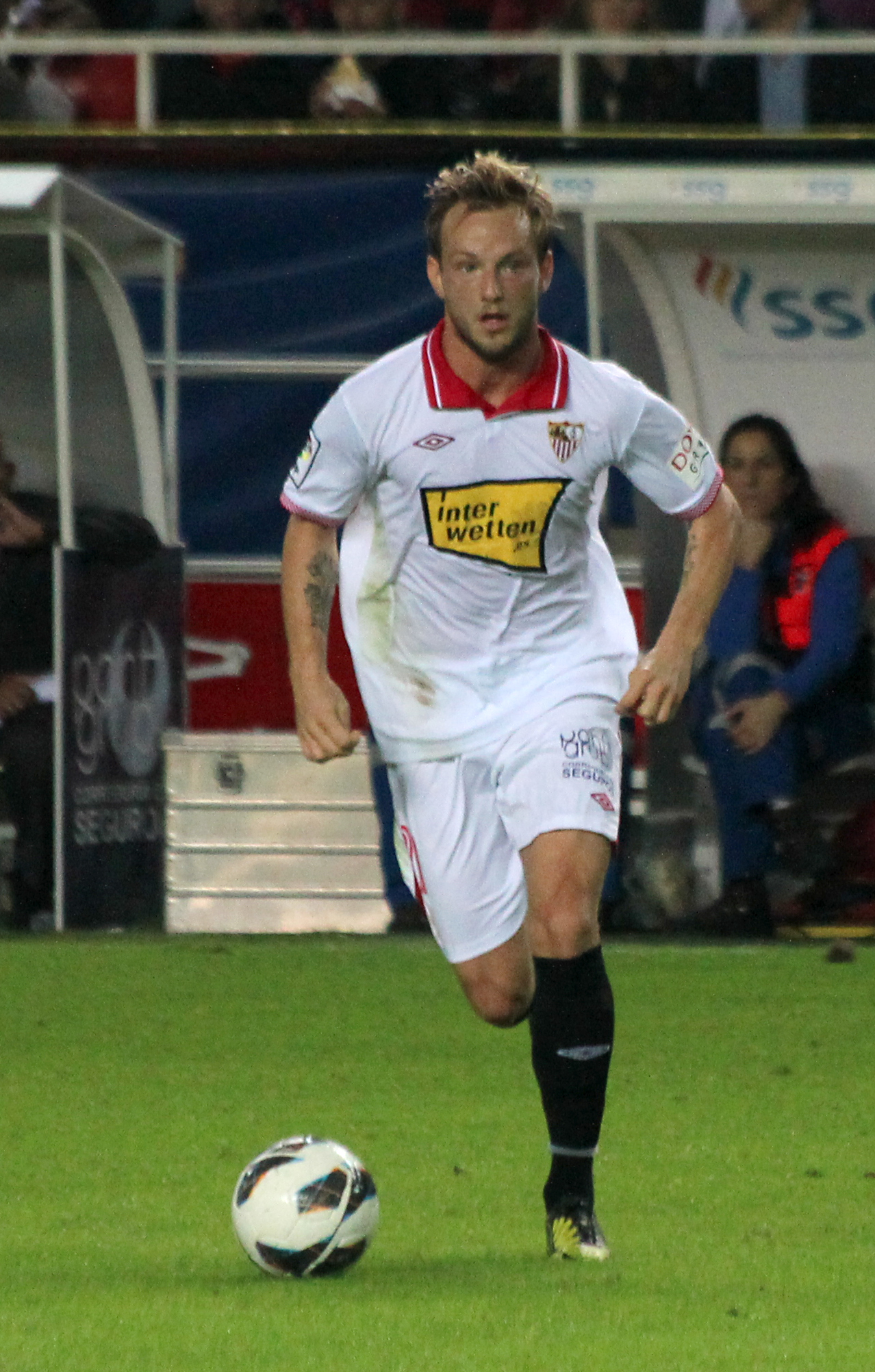
Rakitić playing for Sevilla in 2012

During the 2011–12 season, Rakitić continued to be a first team regular and a key component of the squad. Due to managerial changes and new tactical schemes introduced by new coach Marcelino, who was later replaced by Míchel, Rakitić was given a different role on the pitch than the one he had the previous season, when he was used as central midfielder under coach Gregorio Manzano; during the course of the season, he was mostly deployed as a defensive midfielder. By the end of the season, he made total of 39 appearances for the club, provided six assists and scored one goal in the 2011–12 Copa del Rey. This turned out to be his only goalless Liga season while playing for Sevilla.

==== 2012–13 season ====
Rakitić began the 2012–13 La Liga season by providing an assist in the opening match against Getafe. On 12 September, he provided another assist for Piotr Trochowski at home in a 1–0 win over Real Madrid. He scored his first goal of the season on Matchday 5 against Deportivo de La Coruña. Rakitić scored two goals in the opening 20 minutes of the second Seville derby of the season against cross-city rivals Real Betis. This was his third goal of the season against Sevilla's city rivals, given the fact that he had also scored in the first Seville derby of the season, when Sevilla celebrated a 5–1 victory. During the match against Real Sociedad, Rakitić added two goals to his tally, however, the second one was an own goal, tying the match at 1–1 after he scored the first goal to give his club a 1–0 lead. Until the end of the season, he made total of 42 appearances for the club and scored 12 goals for the team, three coming in the Copa del Rey. He also finished the season providing ten league assists. Statistics showed that Rakitić created 100 chances in total, a sum ranking fourth across all players in Europe that season.

==== 2013–14 season ====
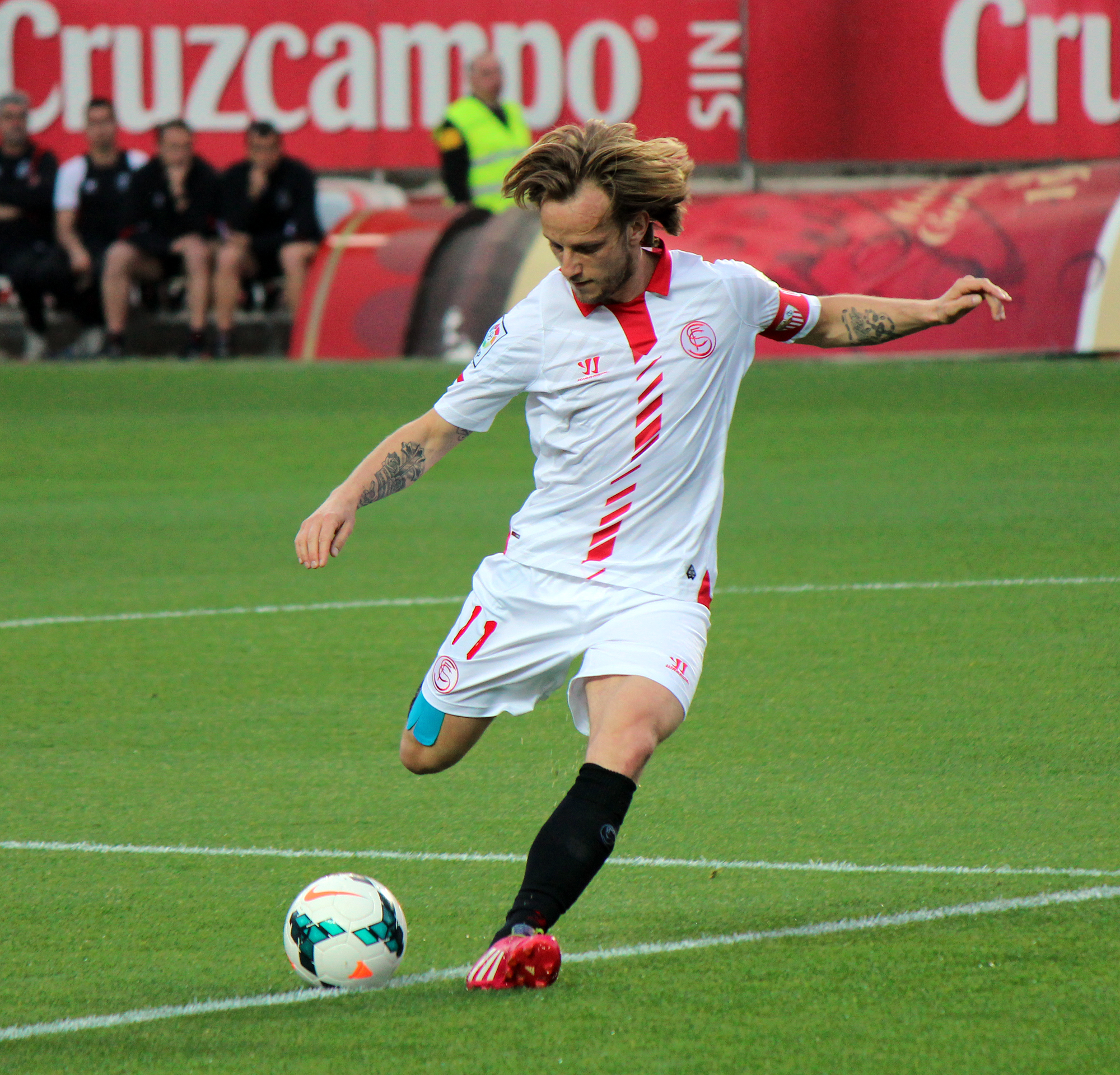
Rakitić playing for Sevilla in 2014

At the beginning of the 2013–14 La Liga season, coach Unai Emery named Rakitić as the new Sevilla captain. Since the beginning of the season, he was one of the most prominent players of the league, scoring the first goal and assisting for the second in a 3–2 away loss against Barcelona on 14 September. In the two last games of September, he scored two goals in a 1–4 away win over Rayo Vallecano, and assisted for the draw 1–1 goal against Real Sociedad. In the final three games of October, Rakitić scored a goal in a 2–0 home win against SC Freiburg, a 2–1 home win over Almería and two goals in a 7–3 loss at the Santiago Bernabéu Stadium against Real Madrid. In the third and fourth games of November, he contributed an assist in away 1–3 win against Espanyol, and two more respectively in a 4–0 home win against Sevilla rivals Betis. In the last game of December, he assisted in a 1–2 away win against Villarreal, helping Sevilla reach a top ten position after a disappointing start of the season, as well attracting attention from other international clubs. In the first game of the 2014 calendar year, he scored in a 3–0 home win against Getafe. In January, he scored two more La Liga goals for Sevilla against Atlético Madrid and Levante, respectively, while also missing a penalty kick in the latter fixture. These performances earned him a La Liga Player of the Month award.

Rakitić's impressive form continued in the season, with several assists and goals from February to May, including two assists in the Europa League 2–2 away draw against Maribor, an assist in the 2–1 home win over Real Madrid and a goal against Porto in a 4–1 home win. He also assisted in the semi-final first leg 2–0 win over Valencia, which they won on aggregate (3–3), thus qualifying for the Europa League Final. He was man of the match as Sevilla won the Final 4–2 on penalties over Benfica at Juventus Stadium in Turin. He was the first player to captain a team to victory in the UEFA Europa League Final and also pick up the official man of the match award. He was included in the UEFA Europa League Team of the Season. By the Spanish national football league association, Rakitić was chosen in La Liga first XI in both first round, and team of the season. He finished the season scoring 15 goals, and recording 17 assists. At the season's LFP Awards, Rakitić won the Fair Play Award and was nominated for Best Midfielder, an award ultimately given to Barcelona's Andrés Iniesta.

=== Barcelona ===
==== 2014–15 season ====
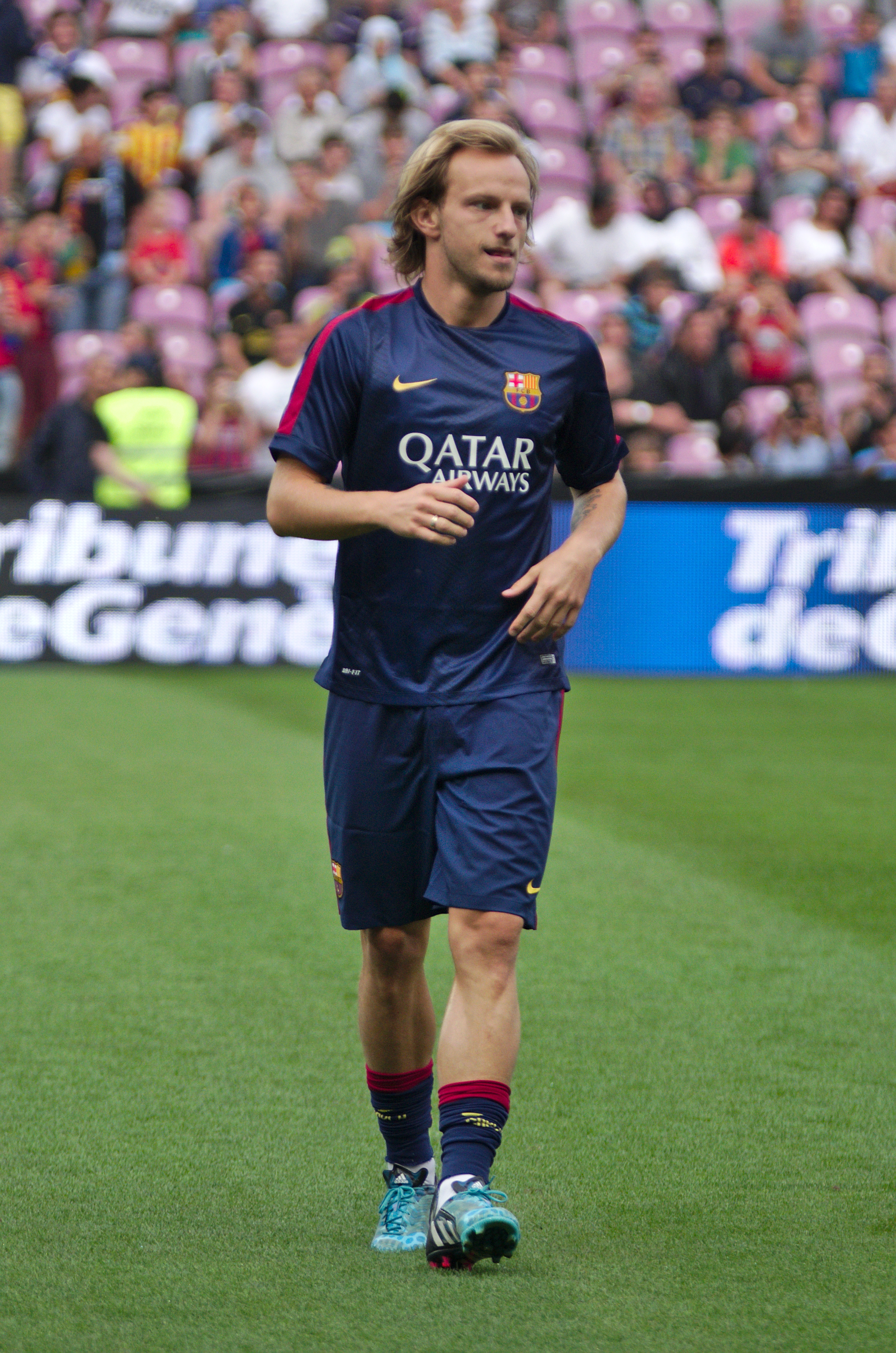
Rakitić training with Barcelona in 2014

On 16 June 2014, Barcelona signed Rakitić on a five-year contract effective 1 July. Upon his arrival, Rakitić was given the squad shirt number 4. He made his debut for the team in a pre-season friendly match against French club Nice on 2 August, when he came on as a second-half substitute for Sergi Roberto.

During a pre-season friendly against HJK Helsinki, Rakitić provided his first assists for Barça, assisting twice in 6–0 victory. His official debut for Barcelona came on 24 August in the opening match of the new Liga season, against Elche. Just moments after half-time, Rakitić played a long ball over-top of Elche's defence towards forward Munir, who flicked the ball it into the far corner of the net to make it 2–0 for Barcelona.

Rakitić's first goal for Barcelona came from outside of the penalty area in a 0–5 away win against Levante on 21 September 2014. In the next week's game, against Granada, Rakitić headed in Lionel Messi's cross for his second goal of the season in a 6–0 victory at Camp Nou. On 18 March 2015, Rakitić scored the first Champions League goal of his career in a 1–0 win against English champions Manchester City in the round of 16 second leg at Camp Nou.

On 6 June 2015, Rakitić scored the opening goal in a 3–1 win against Italian champions Juventus in the 2015 UEFA Champions League Final at Berlin's Olympiastadion, becoming the second Croat ever to score in a Champions League final (after Mario Mandžukić in 2013). This made Barcelona the first club in history to win the treble of domestic league, domestic cup and European Cup twice. Rakitić, for the second year in a row, was included in the La Liga and European (Champions League) team of the season.

==== 2015–16 season ====
On 11 August 2015, Rakitić played the full 120 minutes as Barcelona defeated his former club Sevilla 5–4 to win the 2015 UEFA Super Cup in Tbilisi. In October, he was announced Croatian Footballer of the Year 2015. As an 18th-minute substitute for Sergi Roberto, on 20 October he scored both goals from Neymar assists as Barcelona won 2–0 at BATE Borisov in the Champions League group stage. In December, he was named Croatian Sportsman of the Year 2015. On 30 April 2016, Rakitić scored the opener against Betis as Barcelona won 0–2 to stay top of the Liga table.

==== 2016–17 season ====
On 23 April 2017, Rakitić scored the second goal in a 3–2 away victory against Real Madrid in El Clásico.

==== 2017–18 season ====
On 12 September 2017, Rakitić netted a goal against Juventus in the 2017–18 UEFA Champions League, as Barcelona defeated the previous season's Italian champions 3–0 at home.

==== 2018–19 season ====
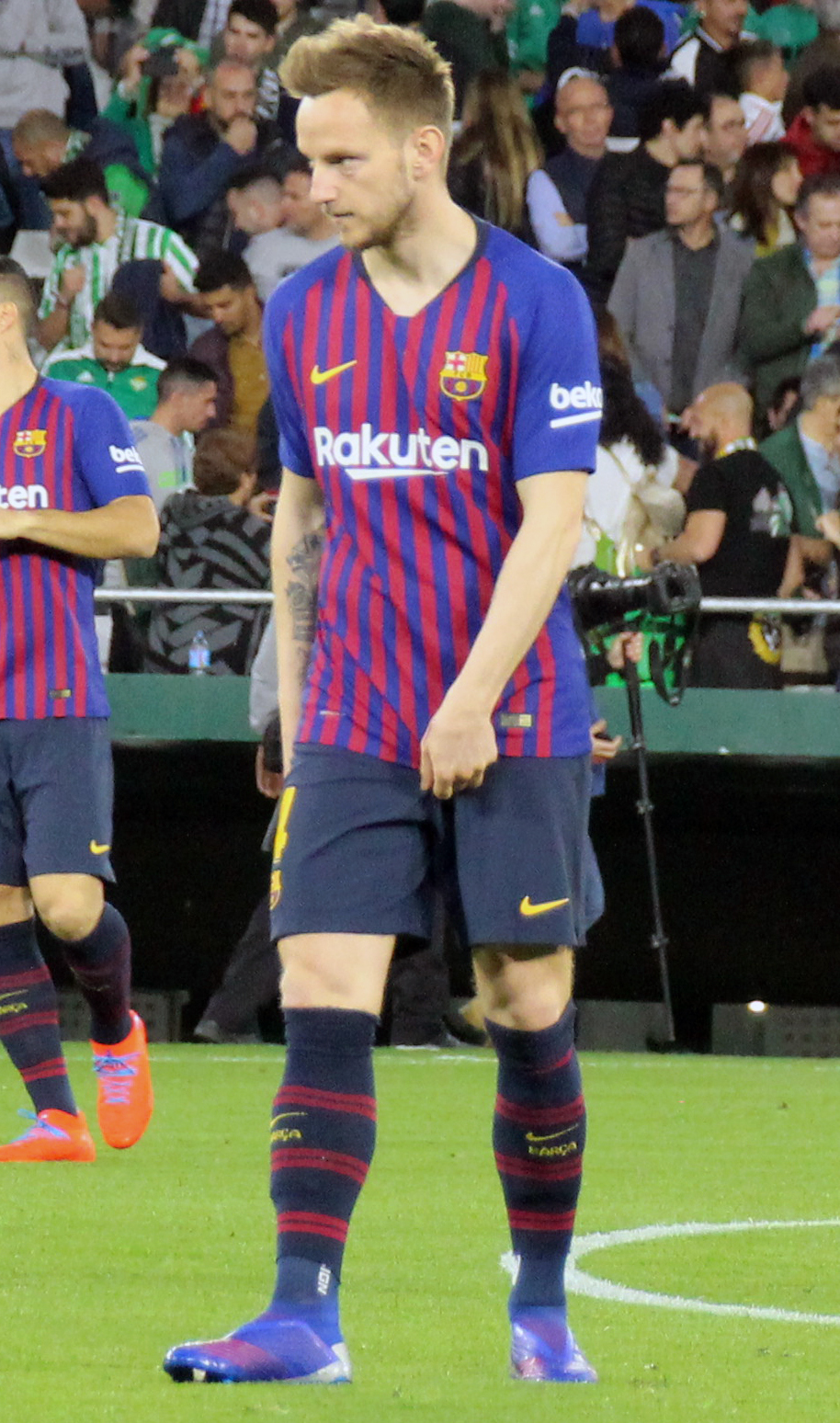
Rakitić playing for Barcelona in 2019

On 3 December 2018, in a Champions League group stage game against Tottenham Hotspur, he scored the second Barça's goal in the 4–2 triumph. The strike was later named the Goal of the Group Stage by fans.

On 2 March 2019, Rakitić scored the only goal of the match against Real Madrid; after which José Mourinho identified him as "one of the most underrated players in the world".

==== 2019–20 season ====
Rakitić's playing time was severely reduced during the 2019–20 season and his role in the team decreased following the arrival of Frenkie de Jong. In October 2019 the player stated: "I want to play, and not just enjoy walking around Barcelona and the sea. I talked to the people in the club, everyone knew about the other options I had, it was no secret."

On 14 June 2020, in Barcelona's first game after the COVID-19 pandemic, Rakitić celebrated his 300th official game in Barcelona's jersey as the club defeated Mallorca 4–0. On 23 June, he scored his first goal of the season in a 1–0 victory over Athletic Bilbao, securing important three points in the title race. After Barcelona lost 8–2 to Bayern Munich in the Champions League quarter-final on 14 August and coach Quique Setién was sacked, newly appointed coach Ronald Koeman informed Rakitić that he was not part of his plans for the upcoming season, alongside teammates Luis Suárez, Arturo Vidal and Samuel Umtiti. At the time of his departure from the club, Rakitić had more appearances for the club than any other European non-Spanish player in its history.

=== Return to Sevilla ===
On 1 September 2020, Rakitić signed for Sevilla on a four-year contract, returning to the club after six years for a nominal €1.5m fee.

On 24 September, he played his first game for Sevilla after coming back, against Bayern Munich in the UEFA Super Cup in Budapest. He won a penalty after being tackled by David Alaba, which Lucas Ocampos successfully converted; however, Bayern came from behind to win the game 2–1 after extra time. Three days later, he scored his first goal since his return as Sevilla defeated Cádiz 3–1. On 10 February 2021, he scored a goal in the Copa del Rey semi-final to seal a 2–0 victory over his former club Barcelona.

On 23 August 2021, in a 1–0 victory over Getafe, Rakitić played his jubilee 200th match for Sevilla. On 31 May 2023, he won his second Europa League trophy with Sevilla.

=== Al-Shabab ===
On 30 January 2024, Sevilla announced that Rakitić would be transferring to Saudi Pro League club Al-Shabab.

=== Hajduk Split and retirement ===
On 20 July 2024, Rakitić announced his departure from Al-Shabab, joining Hajduk Split in his home country of Croatia on a free transfer. The club put out an official statement regarding Rakitić's transfer on 21 July. This move marked the first time Rakitić played club football in Croatia. He made 39 appearances for Hajduk in all competitions in the 2024–25 season, scoring two goals and providing five assists.

On 1 July 2025, Hajduk head coach Gonzalo García announced that Rakitić had officially ended his playing career, and would be transitioning into a position as the assistant of the club's new sporting director Goran Vučević moving forward. On 7 July, Rakitić confirmed his retirement via social media.

== International career ==
Rakitić's first international experience came at youth level with the Switzerland under-17, under-19 and under-21 national teams, but decided to accept the call-up by Croatia national team coach Slaven Bilić and play for the nation's senior team. He made his full international debut for Croatia on 8 September 2007 in their UEFA Euro 2008 qualifier against Estonia in Zagreb, highly praised by the fans as he was entering the game as a substitute. In Croatia's following qualifier, a 0–6 away win over Andorra on 12 September 2007, he scored his first international goal for Croatia in only his second appearance for the team. He finished the year 2007 with five senior international caps to his name, four of which were in the successful Euro 2008 qualifying campaign.

=== Euro 2008 ===
In early May 2008, he joined Croatia's squad for the Euro 2008 tournament in Austria and Switzerland, where he was the second-youngest player in the tournament. He made his first appearance at the tournament as a starter against Germany, and eventually provided a shot which ricocheted off the post and allowed teammate Ivica Olić to score the second goal in their 2–1 victory. He formed a praised trio of Croatian attacking midfielders with his teammates Luka Modrić and Niko Kranjčar. Though playing a strong role against Turkey in the quarter-finals of the tournament, Rakitić went on to miss one of the three unsuccessful penalties in the shootout, thus leading to a victory for Turkey.

Rakitić continued to appear regularly for Croatia during their unsuccessful qualifying campaign for the 2010 FIFA World Cup, making a total of ten appearances and scoring three goals in the competition. On 15 October 2008, he scored a brace in a 4–0 win at home to Andorra. On 5 September 2009, he scored the match-winning goal in a 1–0 win at home to Belarus. Croatia failed to qualify for the finals after finishing third in their group.

=== Euro 2012 ===
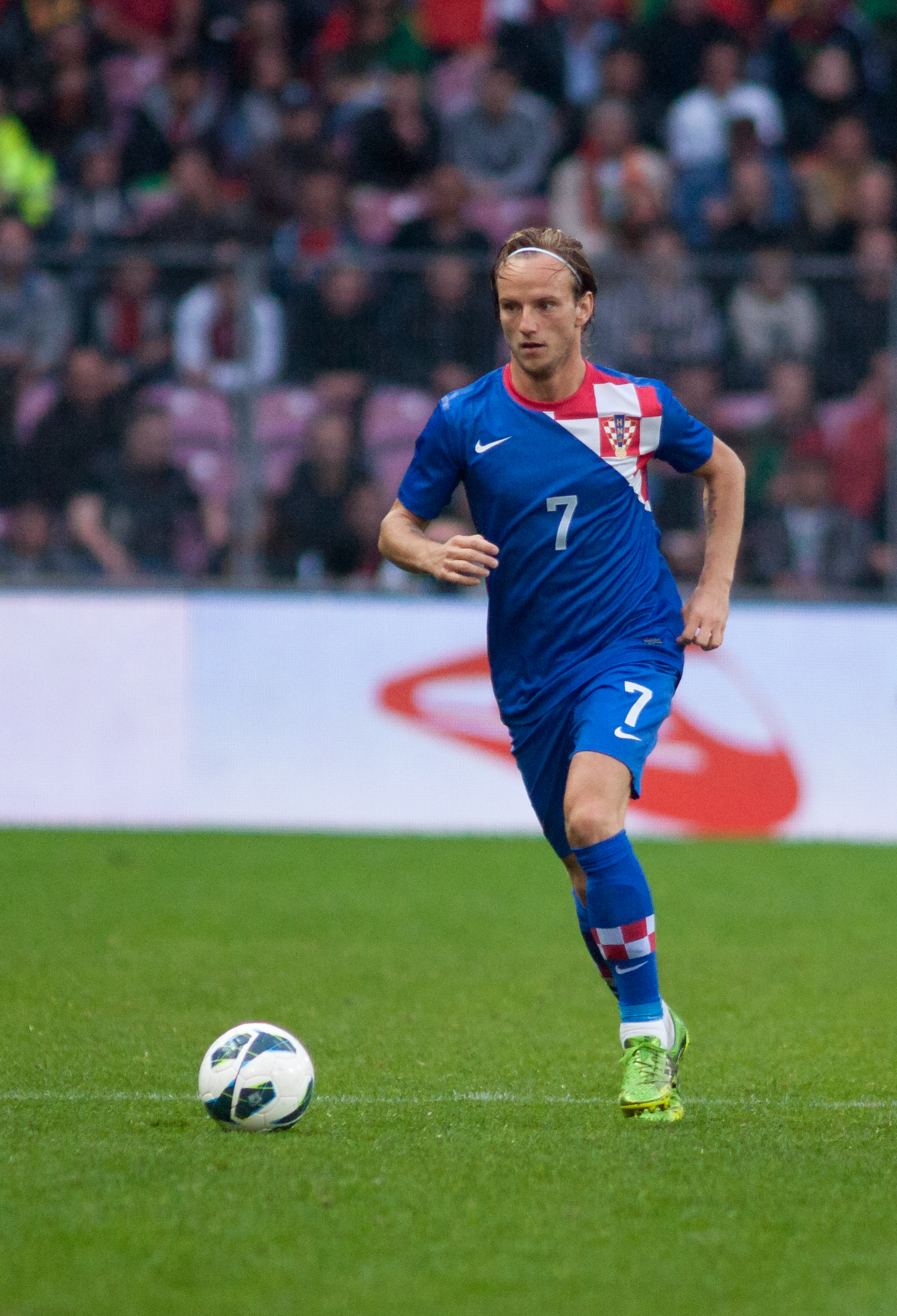
Rakitić playing for Croatia in 2013

After appearing in all of their Euro 2012 qualifiers, he was selected to be part of the Croatian squad at the Euro finals in Poland and Ukraine. Croatia were drawn in Group C together with Spain, Italy and the Republic of Ireland. Rakitić started in all three of Croatia group stage matches. After two matches played, Croatia had four points and were facing defending champions Spain in Gdańsk. With the game goalless and entering the final half-hour, Rakitić burst into the Spanish penalty area but could not direct his header past goalkeeper Iker Casillas after being picked out by a wonderful Luka Modrić pass. It proved to be a costly miss, with Spain's Jesús Navas later scoring an 88th-minute winner to send the Croatians crashing out.

=== 2014 World Cup ===
In the 2014 World Cup qualifying campaign, on 12 October 2012 Rakitić scored a goal from a free-kick against Macedonia at Philip II National Arena to help secure a 1–2 victory for Croatia. Eventually, after the playoffs, the team qualified for the World Cup final stages. They were drawn into Group A alongside Brazil, Mexico and Cameroon. Croatia played the opening match against Brazil, which they lost 3–1. In the second match, Croatia won 4–0 against Cameroon, but did not progress as they lost 1–3 against Mexico, with Rakitić providing the assist for the only Croatian goal.

=== Euro 2016 ===
Rakitić scored his first and only goal in the Euro 2016 qualifiers against Bulgaria. He was selected to be part of the Croatian squad at Euro in France. Croatia were drawn in Group D along with Spain, Czech Republic and Turkey. Rakitić started Croatia's opening game where they secured a narrow victory by one goal against Turkey. On 17 June 2016, Rakitić scored a goal to double Croatia's lead against the Czech Republic, but later the game was turned around when the play was halted briefly after Croatian fans threw flares onto the pitch. Shortly after the restart, the referee rewarded Czech Republic a penalty and the game ended in a 2–2 draw.

After a 2–1 win over defending champions Spain, Croatia topped Group D and went on to face Portugal in the next round. Croatia, however, lost 1–0 after Portugal's Ricardo Quaresma scored a 117th-minute, extra-time winner to send Croatia out of the tournament. Rakitić later stated that "Croatia did not deserve to go out and the best team were going home". Rakitić appeared in all of Croatia's matches and ended the tournament by scoring one goal.

=== 2018 World Cup ===
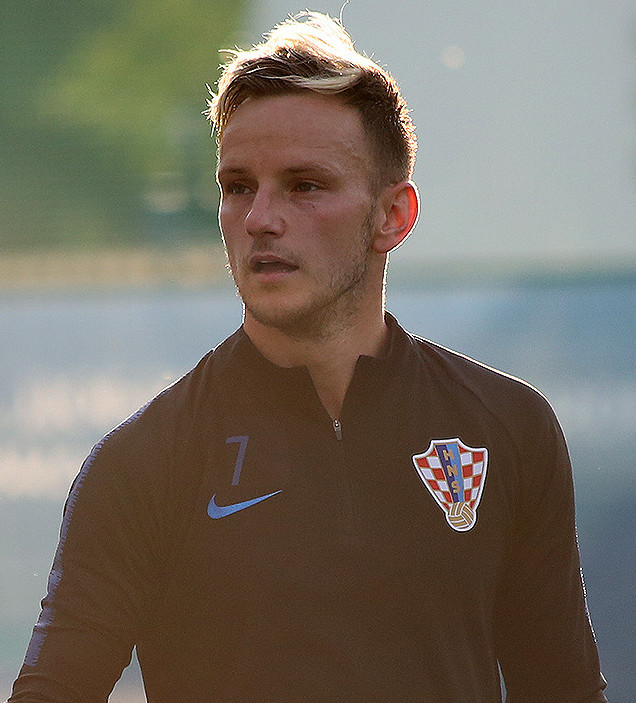
Rakitić training with Croatia in 2018

On 4 June 2018, Rakitić was named in Croatia's 23-man squad for the 2018 FIFA World Cup in Russia. On 21 June 2018, Rakitić scored Croatia's third goal in a 3–0 victory over Argentina in their second group stage match of the tournament.

On 1 July, Rakitić scored the winning penalty kick in the penalty shoot-out against Denmark, as Croatia progressed to the quarter-final. One week later, on 7 July, Rakitić again scored the winning penalty kick in the penalty shoot-out against Russia, as Croatia progressed to the semi-final. Croatia reached the final of the tournament, where they were defeated 4–2 by France on 15 July.

=== 2018–19 Nations League ===
For the inaugural edition of the UEFA Nations League, Croatia was drawn in the group with Spain and England.

Rakitić took part in three out of four matches, celebrating his 100th international cap in the historical 0–6 loss to Spain in Elche. He missed the deciding fixture against England at the Wembley Stadium, that saw the winner go through to the finals, due to a hamstring injury, as Croatia lost 1–2 and finished at the bottom of the group.

=== Retirement ===
During Euro 2020 qualifying, Rakitić took part in only four out of eight games due to injuries and complicated club situation.

On 21 September 2020, the Croatian Football Federation unexpectedly announced that Rakitić retired from the international duty. At the time of his retirement, he had made 106 appearances and scored 15 goals, making him fourth most capped player (after Darijo Srna, Luka Modrić and Stipe Pletikosa) and ninth joint top goalscorer in the history of the national team. He stated:

Saying goodbye to the Croatian national team is the most difficult decision in my career, but I felt that this was the moment when I had to break away and make that decision. I enjoyed every game I played for my homeland, and unforgettable moments from the World Cup will remain among my favourites. I am convinced that we still have a great team with a bright future ahead. I wish my friends and teammates all the luck in the world for the upcoming challenges, and in me they will have the biggest fan.

== Style of play ==
A talented, intelligent, and hard-working midfielder, Rakitić was known in the media as a well-rounded playmaker, with good stamina and defensive skills, as well as excellent technique, close control, vision, passing, and an ability to read the game, which enabled him to dictate play in midfield and create chances for teammates after winning back possession, despite his lack of pace. As such, he was capable of both breaking down opposing plays and subsequently transitioning the ball forward to start attacks; he was also capable of scoring goals himself, courtesy of his striking ability from distance, as well as his ability to find and exploit spaces with his movement off the ball and make attacking runs into the box. A versatile player, he was able to play in several midfield positions, and was deployed as a winger on either side of the pitch, as a central midfielder, as an attacking midfielder, as a defensive midfielder, in a box-to-box role, or even as a deep-lying playmaker. In 2019, in an interview with BeIN Sports, manager José Mourinho described Rakitić as "one of the most underrated players in the world." He later added: "He is fantastic on all levels; he defends, he compensates for [Lionel] Messi, he runs and he's sensible with the ball at his feet."

== Post-playing career ==
In 2022, having already retired from international football but still playing for Sevilla, Rakitić graduated from the UEFA Certificate in Football Management course, led by the UEFA Academy. The program features ten online modules which enhance participants' deeper understanding of the football industry. He is also an ambassador for the UEFA Foundation for Children.

On 18 July 2025, less than two weeks after retiring from professional football, Rakitić announced he had agreed to become the new technical director of Hajduk Split. In this role, he works under the club's sporting director Goran Vučević, who, like Rakitić, is also a former midfielder of Barcelona, Hajduk and the Croatia national team.

== Personal life ==
Rakitić married Raquel Mauri in April 2013 in Seville after two years of dating. Rakitić initially met her on the first night he arrived in Seville in the summer of 2011, at a hotel bar, and attributed his fluent learning of Spanish, to his repeated attempts to take her out on a date. In July 2013, their daughter Althea was born. In May 2016, their second daughter, Adara, was born.

Rakitić is a polyglot. He speaks Croatian, German, Spanish, English, French and Italian.

In late June 2016, Rakitić rented a villa on the island of Ugljan, where he arrived on vacation with his family. On 1 July, the house was allegedly attacked by a group of six men who threw rocks at it, breaking several windows and forcing Rakitić and his family to flee the island on a speedboat. However, Slobodna Dalmacija reporters investigated the event and discovered that only one window was broken by an unknown perpetrator, and that Rakitić rather calmly left the island hours later, giving autographs to the local fans.

As Rakitić was born and raised in Switzerland, he also possesses Swiss citizenship, along with Croatian citizenship by descent, as such, he possesses dual citizenship. Most notably, he represented Switzerland at the Under-17, Under-19 and Under-21 teams. In 2007, when he was 19, various people in Switzerland were outraged at his decision to represent Croatia in senior international football. Rakitić said in an interview with Swiss newspaper Le Temps, prior to the 2018 FIFA World Cup, that he was proud to play for Switzerland at youth level, as he grew up in Switzerland and that he knew where he came from. Rakitić also remarked in the same interview that he was in favour of representing Croatia in senior international football and was not against Switzerland, and initially called and informed the then-Swiss coach Köbi Kuhn of his decision to select Croatia, before contacting the then-Croatia boss Slaven Bilić.

== Career statistics ==
=== Club ===
Appearances and goals by club, season and competition
Club	Season	League			National cup (Note: Includes Swiss Cup, DFB-Pokal, Copa del Rey, Croatian Cup)		Continental		Other		Total	
Club	Season	Division	Apps	Goals	Apps	Goals	Apps	Goals	Apps	Goals	Apps	Goals
Nordstern Basel	2004–05	2. Liga Interregional	0	0	1	0	—		—		1	0
Basel II	2005–06	1. Liga	21	9	—		—		—		21	9
Basel	2005–06	Swiss Super League	1	0	1	0	1 (Note: Appearance(s) in UEFA Cup)	0	—		3	0
Basel	2006–07	Swiss Super League	33	11	5	0	9	0	—		47	11
Basel	Total		34	11	6	0	10	0	—		50	11
Schalke 04	2007–08	Bundesliga	29	3	3	1	7 (Note: Appearances in UEFA Champions League)	0	3 (Note: Appearances in DFL-Ligapokal)	0	42	4
Schalke 04	2008–09	Bundesliga	23	1	4	1	7 (Note: Two appearances in UEFA Champions League, five appearances and one goal in UEFA Cup)	1	—		34	3
Schalke 04	2009–10	Bundesliga	29	7	4	0	—		—		33	7
Schalke 04	2010–11	Bundesliga	16	1	4	1	5	0	1 (Note: Appearance in DFL-Supercup)	0	26	2
Schalke 04	Total		97	12	15	3	19	1	4	0	135	16
Sevilla	2010–11	La Liga	13	5	1	0	2 (Note: Appearances in UEFA Europa League)	0	—		16	5
Sevilla	2011–12	La Liga	36	0	3	1	0	0	—		39	1
Sevilla	2012–13	La Liga	34	8	8	3	—		—		42	11
Sevilla	2013–14	La Liga	34	12	0	0	18	3	—		52	15
Sevilla	Total		117	25	12	4	20	3	—		149	32
Barcelona	2014–15	La Liga	32	5	7	1	12	2	—		51	8
Barcelona	2015–16	La Liga	36	7	6	0	10	2	5 (Note: Two appearances in Supercopa de España, one appearance in UEFA Super Cup, two appearances in FIFA Club World Cup)	0	57	9
Barcelona	2016–17	La Liga	32	8	8	1	9	0	2 (Note: Appearance(s) in Supercopa de España)	0	51	9
Barcelona	2017–18	La Liga	35	1	8	2	10	1	2	0	55	4
Barcelona	2018–19	La Liga	34	3	7	1	12	1	1	0	54	5
Barcelona	2019–20	La Liga	31	1	3	0	7	0	1	0	42	1
Barcelona	Total		200	25	39	5	60	6	11	0	310	36
Sevilla	2020–21	La Liga	37	4	4	2	8	2	1 (Note: Appearance in UEFA Super Cup)	0	50	8
Sevilla	2021–22	La Liga	35	4	3	0	8 (Note: Five appearances and two goals in UEFA Champions League, three appearances and one goal in UEFA Europa League)	3	—		46	7
Sevilla	2022–23	La Liga	31	1	5	1	15 (Note: Six appearances in UEFA Champions League, nine appearances in UEFA Europa League)	0	—		51	2
Sevilla	2023–24	La Liga	18	2	2	0	6	0	1	0	27	2
Sevilla	Total		121	11	14	3	37	5	2	0	174	19
Al-Shabab	2023–24	Saudi Pro League	8	1	—		—		—		8	1
Hajduk Split	2024–25	HNL	35	2	1	0	3 (Note: Appearances in UEFA Conference League)	0	—		39	2
Career total			633	96	88	15	149	15	17	0	887	126

=== International ===
Appearances and goals by national team and year
National team	Year	Apps	Goals
Croatia	2007	5	1
Croatia	2008	11	4
Croatia	2009	8	2
Croatia	2010	8	1
Croatia	2011	6	0
Croatia	2012	10	1
Croatia	2013	11	0
Croatia	2014	10	0
Croatia	2015	6	1
Croatia	2016	7	3
Croatia	2017	6	0
Croatia	2018	14	2
Croatia	2019	4	0
Total		106	15

Croatia score listed first, score column indicates score after each Rakitić goal.

List of international goals scored by Ivan Rakitić
No.	Date	Venue	Cap	Opponent	Score	Result	Competition
1	12 September 2007	Estadi Comunal d'Andorra la Vella, Andorra la Vella, Andorra	2	Andorra	6–0	6–0	UEFA Euro 2008 qualification
2	20 August 2008	Ljudski vrt, Maribor, Slovenia	12	Slovenia	1–1	3–2	Friendly
3	20 August 2008	Ljudski vrt, Maribor, Slovenia	12	Slovenia	3–2	3–2	Friendly
4	15 October 2008	Stadion Maksimir, Zagreb, Croatia	16	Andorra	1–0	4–0	2010 FIFA World Cup qualification
5	15 October 2008	Stadion Maksimir, Zagreb, Croatia	16	Andorra	4–0	4–0	2010 FIFA World Cup qualification
6	11 February 2009	Stadionul Steaua, Bucharest, Romania	17	Romania	1–1	2–1	Friendly
7	5 September 2009	Stadion Maksimir, Zagreb, Croatia	21	Belarus	1–0	1–0	2010 FIFA World Cup qualification
8	23 May 2010	Gradski Vrt Stadium, Osijek, Croatia	26	Wales	1–0	2–0	Friendly
9	12 October 2012	Philip II National Arena, Skopje, Macedonia	47	Macedonia	2–1	2–1	2014 FIFA World Cup qualification
10	10 October 2015	Stadion Maksimir, Zagreb, Croatia	74	Bulgaria	2–0	3–0	UEFA Euro 2016 qualification
11	4 June 2016	Stadion Rujevica, Rijeka, Croatia	76	San Marino	7–0	10–0	Friendly
12	17 June 2016	Stade Geoffroy-Guichard, Saint-Étienne, France	78	Czech Republic	2–0	2–2	UEFA Euro 2016
13	5 September 2016	Stadion Maksimir, Zagreb, Croatia	81	Turkey	1–0	1–1	2018 FIFA World Cup qualification
14	27 March 2018	AT&T Stadium, Arlington, United States	90	Mexico	1–0	1–0	Friendly
15	21 June 2018	Nizhny Novgorod Stadium, Nizhny Novgorod, Russia	94	Argentina	3–0	3–0	2018 FIFA World Cup

== Honours ==
Basel

- Swiss Cup: 2006–07

Sevilla

- UEFA Europa League: 2013–14, 2022–23
- UEFA-CONMEBOL Club Challenge: 2023

Barcelona

- La Liga: 2014–15, 2015–16, 2017–18, 2018–19
- Copa del Rey: 2014–15, 2015–16, 2016–17, 2017–18
- Supercopa de España: 2016, 2018
- UEFA Champions League: 2014–15
- UEFA Super Cup: 2015
- FIFA Club World Cup: 2015

Croatia

- FIFA World Cup runner-up: 2018

Individual

- Swiss Super League Young Player of the Year: 2006–07
- Swiss Super League Goal of the Season: 2006–07
- La Liga Fair Play award: 2013–14
- La Liga Player of the Month: January 2014
- UEFA Europa League Final Man of the Match: 2014
- La Liga Team of the Season: 2013–14, 2014–15
- UEFA La Liga Team of The Season: 2018–19
- UEFA Europa League Team of the Season: 2013–14, 2022–23
- UEFA Champions League Team of the Season: 2014–15
- Croatian Footballer of the Year: 2015
- Croatian Sportsman of the Year: 2015
- FIFA FIFPro World11 3rd team: 2018
- La Liga Goal of the Month: November 2023
- Barça Players' Award: 2017–18

Orders

- Order of Duke Branimir: 2018

== See also ==
- List of men's footballers with 100 or more international caps
- List of footballers with 400 or more La Liga appearances
