= Tomás =

Tomás may refer to:

- Tomás (given name)
- Tomás (surname)
