= Tomi Rautio =

Finnish ice hockey goaltender

- Born: March 18, 1996 (age 29); Kouvola, Finland
- Height: 6 ft 0 in (183 cm)
- Weight: 183 lb (83 kg; 13 st 1 lb)
- Position: Goalie
- Catches: Left
- team Former teams: Free agent KooKoo
- Playing career: 2015–present

Tomi Rautio (born March 18, 1996) is a Finnish professional ice hockey goaltender. He is currently a free agent having last played for Hokki of Mestis.

Rautio played one game for KooKoo during the 2015–16 Liiga season. He also had loan spells in Mestis with Hermes and Hokki before signing for Pyry of the Suomi-sarja on June 19, 2017. On May 16, 2018, Rautio returned to Hokki.
