= Tomi Peltonen =

Finnish ice hockey player

- Born: January 22, 1987 (age 39) Tampere, Finland
- Height: 5 ft 10 in (178 cm)
- Weight: 176 lb (80 kg; 12 st 8 lb)
- Position: Forward
- Shoots: Left
- Mestis team Former teams: LeKi; Tappara; Kiekko-Laser; Koovee; KooKoo
- NHL draft: Undrafted
- Playing career: 2007–present

Tomi Peltonen (born January 22, 1987) is a Finnish professional ice hockey player. He is currently playing for LeKi of the Finnish Mestis.

Peltonen made his Liiga debut playing with Tappara during the 2007–08 Liiga season.
