= Tom (1771 ship) =

History

Great Britain
- Name: Tom
- Owner: James Sawrey
- Launched: 1771, Britain
- Fate: Condemned 1794

General characteristics
- Tons burthen: pre-1780:100; post-1780: 160, or 163, or 170 (bm)
- Armament: 14 × 4-pounder guns (1783)

Tom was launched in 1771 in Britain. Between 1778 and 1792 she was a West Indiaman, trading between Lancaster and Jamaica, St Lucia, and Grenada. New owners in 1792 sailed Tom as a slave ship in the triangular trade in enslaved people. She was condemned in 1794 at Barbados after having delivered the captives she had acquired in the Cameroons.

== Career ==
Tom first appeared in Lloyd's Register (LR) in the volume for 1778.

Year	Master	Owner	Trade	Source & notes
1778	Warbrick	Rawlinson	Lancaster–Jamaica	LR
1781	Warbrick	Rawlinson	Lancaster–St Lucia	LR; lengthened and repaired 1780
1792	Warbrick; Ainsworth	Rawlinson; Sawrey	Lancaster–Grenada; Lancaster–Africa	LR; lengthened and repaired 1780, thorough repair 1785, & repairs 1792

James Sawrey owned at least two vessels, Tom, and Hope. Captain Tobias Collins sailed Hope to West Africa in 1791–1792, with Ainsworth replacing him at some point, and Tom in 1792, replacing Ainsworth. LR for 1793 shows Ainsworth replacing Collins as master on Hope. The time and place of the exchange is an open question. Before Collins left on Hope, on 26 September 1791, James Savery had instructed him to sail on to the Cameroons to gather as much ivory and other dead cargo as he could find.

Captain Ainsworth sailed from Liverpool on 24 March 1792, bound for the Cameroons. Tom arrived at Barbados in November 1793 with 39 captives.

== Fate ==
Tom was condemned at Barbados in 1794.
