= Adolf Tuma =

Austrian painter and lithographer (born 1956)

Adolf "Adi" Tuma (born 27 June 1956) is an Austrian painter and lithographer. His activities comprise decorative architecture, paintings, stamps and cancellations. Tuma's primary subject is nature.

He is best known for his designs used for stamps by various postal administrations. In this context he has received a Silver Decoration to the Republic of Austria. Presently his works on stamps only contains more than 100 pieces.

== Artistic style and themes ==
His free designs reflect his respect and love for nature in its widest sense. He is influenced by Friedensreich Hundertwasser

== Honors ==
Yehudi Menuhin Trophy 2006 for Music Philately

== List of stamps (extract) ==
=== for Austria ===
- 1999 Europe 1999
- 2004 Cardinal Franz König
- 2004 Catholics' Day
- 2005 The Mauthausen Concentration Camp
- 2005 50 years reopening of the (Austrian) National Theatre and State Opera House
- 2006 China-Austria joint issue: “Guqin”
- 2006 China-Austria joint issue: “Piano”

=== for Liechtenstein ===
- 2003 White Storks in the Alpine River Valley

=== for Luxembourg ===
- 2000 Historic patrimony: Vauban Circular Walk
