= Melcior Juncà =

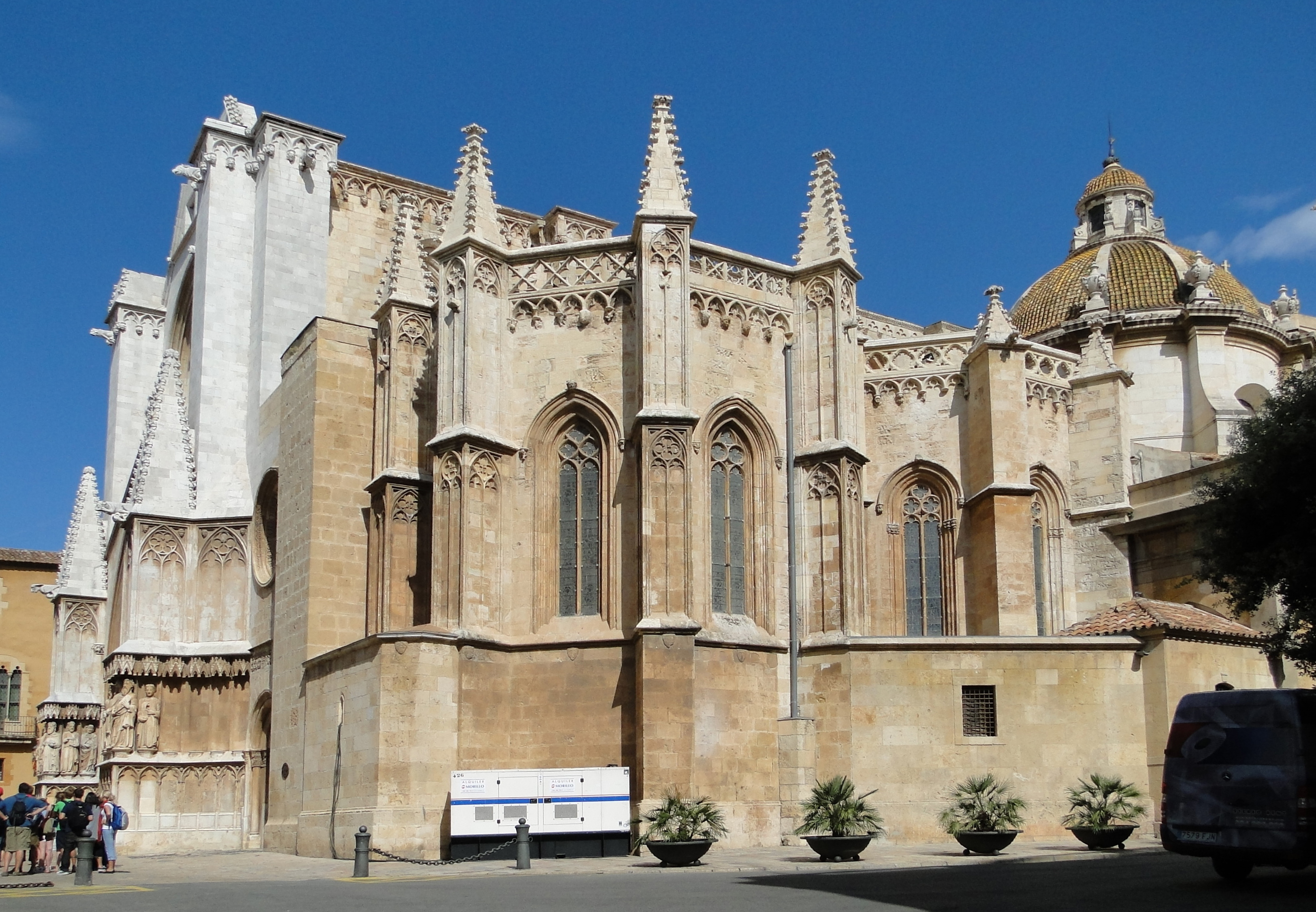
Cathedral of Tarragona

Melcior Juncà i Farré (Sant Joan de les Abadesses, Ripollès, 1757 - Tarragona, 1824) was a Catalan maestro de capilla, composer and music theorist. He was son of a musician, Jacinto Juncà. From 1798 to 1806 he was chapel master at the Cathedral of Tarragona. His treatise La Melopea desconocida describes a method based on speculative and practical division of the octave into twenty-four parts.

== Works, editions, recordings ==
His output is primarily of religious music in Latin; Masses, antiphons, regrets motets; and vernacular Spanish songs, tonos, and villancicos. His motet Beata mater was recorded in 2007.
