= Tomàs Milans i Godayol =

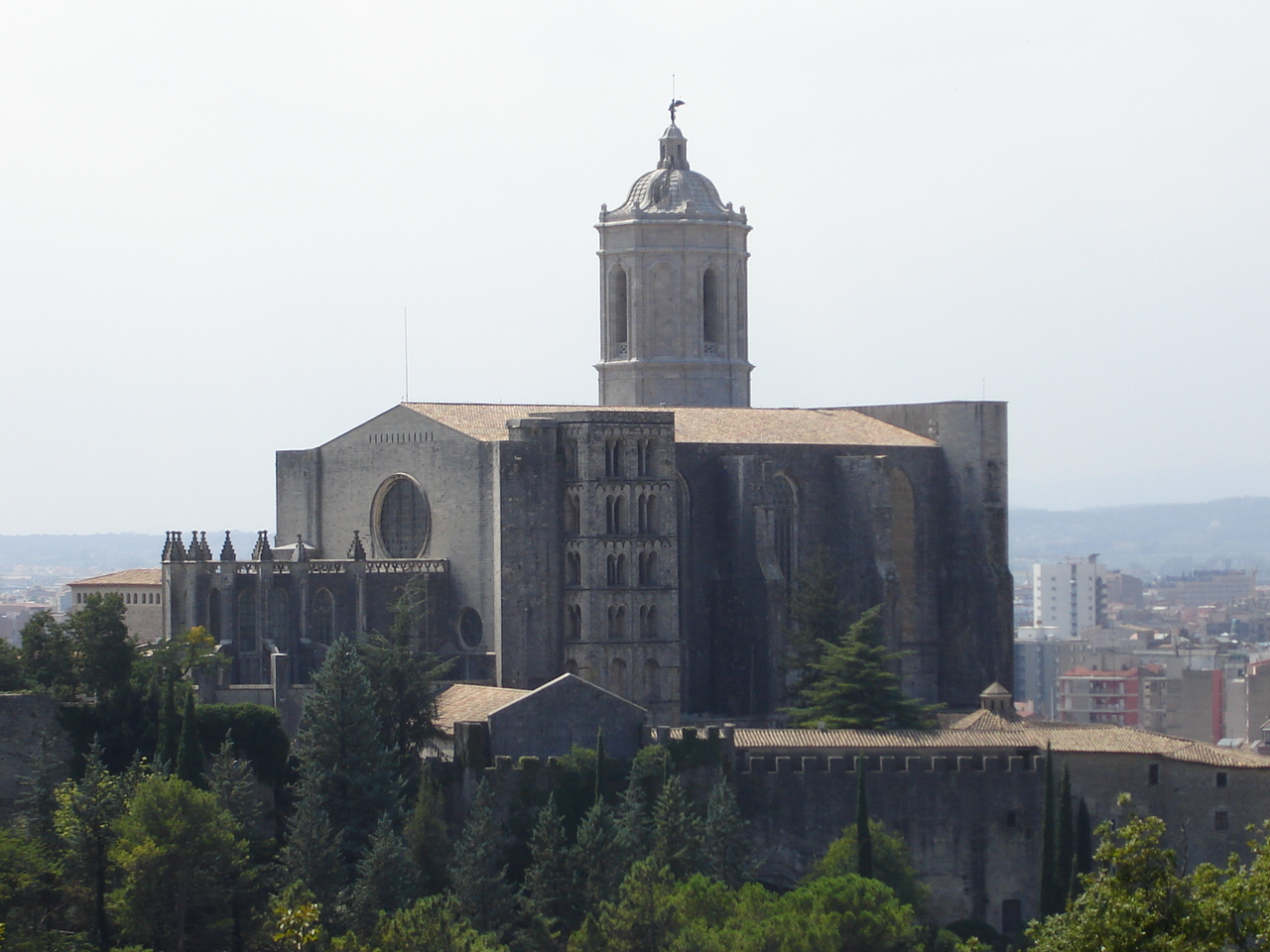
Girona Cathedral

Tomàs Milans i Godayol (Canet de Mar, 1672 - Girona, 1742) was a Catalan composer. He was the son of Marc Antoni Milans i Macià (Canet de Mar, 1625 - 1708) and Marianna Godayol. He was mestre de capella at Girona Cathedral. During the War of the Spanish Succession, 1702–1713, he was director of the capilla real.

== Works, editions and recordings ==
- Milans i Godayol: Litaniae lauretanae; Salve Regina a 6; Charitas Dei; Magnificat a 8; Suspende, infelice solo cantata for the Holy Sacrament; Reges Tharsis antiphon in canon for the Day of the Kings for 3 voices and continuo; Nunc dimittis a 6; Hala, zagalas! tono for Christmas. - Laia Frigole (soprano), La Xantria (choir), Pere Lluís Biosca, director; Musiepoca, CD, 2012
- Milans: Zarzuela al Santísimo. With works by Francisco Valls, Josep Carcoler, Antonio Literes, Joan Rossell. Mapa Harmónico dir. Francesc Bonastre. Columna Musica 2005.
