= Tomi Saarelma =

Finnish footballer (born 1988)

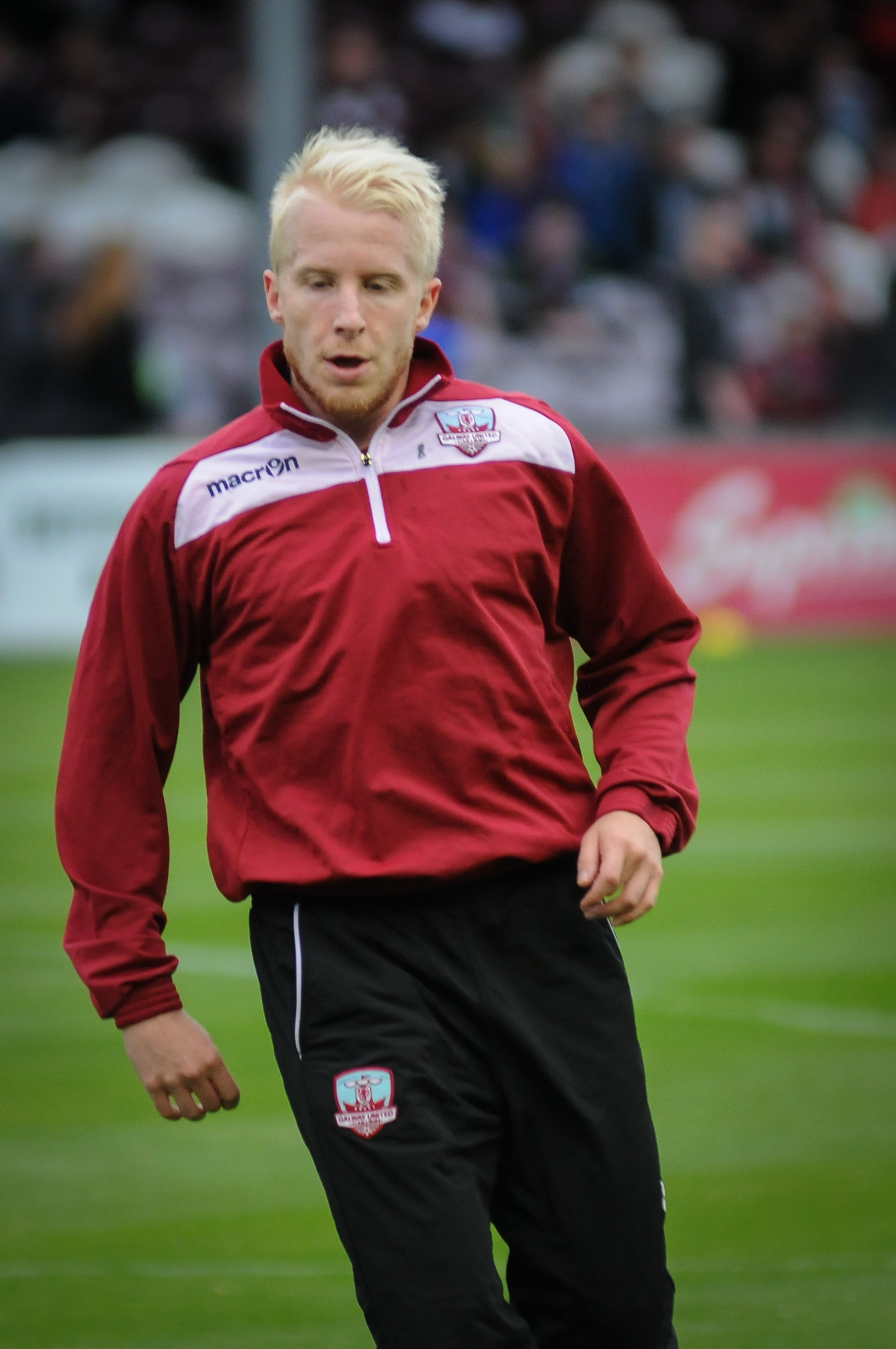

Personal information
- Date of birth: 30 November 1988 (age 37)
- Place of birth: Hollola, Finland
- Height: 1.75 m (5 ft 9 in)
- Position: Winger

Team information
- Current team: MYPA
- Number: 25

Youth career
- –2005: FC Reipas / FC Kuusysi
- 2005–2007: Chelsea FC

Senior career*
Years	Team	Apps	(Gls)
2008	FC KooTeePee	22	(2)
2009	1. FC Kleve	1	(0)
2009–2011	FC Levadia	25	(4)
2011–2012	FC Baden	17	(3)
2012–2013	SR Delémont	23	(1)
2013	BSC Old Boys	10	(0)
2014	FC Lahti	2	(0)
2015	Galway United	5	(0)
2017–2018	FC Zürich	13	(0)
2018	TPS	0	(0)
2019–	MYPA	10	(1)
2021–2023	SV Muttenz	27	(1)
2023–	Möhlin-Riburg	6	(0)

International career
–	Finland U19	7	(0)
–	Finland U20	10	(0)
- * Club domestic league appearances and goals as of 11:55, 30 December 2024 (UTC)

Tomi Saarelma (born 30 November 1988) is a former professional Finnish footballer.

His previous clubs include Chelsea FC, FC KooTeePee, 1. FC Kleve, FC Levadia, FC Baden, BSC Old Boys, SR Delémont, SV Muttenz and FC Lahti.

== Club career ==
When Saarelma was 16, he was spotted by the scouts of English club Chelsea, playing for his youth club FC Lahti. After a successful trial with the club, Saarelma was offered a two-year contract in the beginning of 2005, and officially moved to the club in the summer of 2005. In the beginning of his Chelsea career, he formed an important part of the club's youth team and helped the team to reach the final of the famous tournament, Milk Cup, where they lost to FC Barcelona. After two and a half seasons Saarelma left the club, where he was highly praised for his skills with the ball and his intelligence but as a small player, had difficulties with the physical side of the game, which is an important part of the English football.

After short spells with FC Twente in Holland and Djurgårdens IF in Sweden in 2008 Saarelma returned to Finland and signed a two-year contract with FC KooTeePee of the Veikkausliiga, the highest level of football in Finland. Saarelma was one of the key figures in the team, specially at the second part of the season, making 22 appearances and scoring two goals. After just one season Saarelma left the club and signed with the German side 1. FC Kleve, but left just after six months.

In the summer of 2009 Saarelma signed with Estonia's biggest club, FC Levadia, where he won the league title in his first season, making 19 league appearances and scoring 4 goals. Saarelma also was helping the team do well in Europe, where Levadia faced many top teams, for example Turkish side Galatasaray, who put them out of the Europa League 2009. He won the Estonian Cup and Super Cup with Levadia in 2010. Saarelma left the club before the 2011 season began and moved to Swiss 1. Liga club FC Baden. In the summer of 2012 Saarelma moved to SR Delemont In Swiss Challenge League.

On 2 September 2015, Saarelma signed for League of Ireland side Galway United FC until the end of the 2015 season, where he helped the team to reach the Irish League Cup Final. After that, he signed with FC Zürich in Switzerland in September 2017. He played for the club until August 2018, and then signed with TPS.After his spell in Finland, he returned to the lower leagues of Switzerland. In 2024, he took on the role of managing a Swiss youth team alongside his professional playing career.

== International career ==
Saarelma has represented Finland at all youth international levels.

== Honours ==
FCI Levadia

- Meistriliiga: 2009

Galway United

- League of Ireland Cup; runner up: 2015
