= Tůma =

Tůma (Czech feminine: Tůmová) is a Czech surname. Notable people with the surname include:

- Bohdan Tůma (born 1967), Czech actor and voice actor
- František Tůma (1704–1774), Czech composer
- Jana Tůmová (born 1974), Czech volleyball player
- Jaroslav Tůma (born 1956), Czech organist
- Marie Tůmová (1866–1925), Czech women's suffragist
- Martin Tůma (born 1985), Czech ice hockey player
- Milena Tůmová (fl. 1966–1969), Czech ice dancer
- Miloslava Tůmová-Záhorská (fl. 1948–1956), Czechoslovak figure skater
- Stanislav Tůma (born 1948), Czech wrestler
- Zdeněk Tůma (born 1960), Czech economist
