= Tompson =

Tompson is a surname. Notable people with the surname include:

- Charles Tompson (1807–1883), Australian public servant and poet
- Frederick A. Tompson (1857–1919), American architect
- Nockold Tompson (1714–1777), English mayor
- Ruthie Tompson (1910–2021), American animator and artist

== See also ==
- Thompson (surname)
