= Meteorological Service of Catalonia =

Meteorological agency

- Servei Meteorològic de Catalunya (in Catalan)

Public company overview
- Formed: 23 July 1996; 30 years ago
- Preceding public company: 31 March 1921; 105 years ago
- Dissolved: 29 January 1939; 87 years ago
- Jurisdiction: Catalonia (Spain)
- Headquarters: carrer Dr. Roux 80, 1st floor. E-08017 Barcelona, Catalonia (Spain); 41.39995°N 2.12831°E
- Public company executive: Sarai Sarroca i Cervelló, Director
- Parent department: Department of Climate Action, Food and Rural Agenda (Government of Catalonia)
- Website: en.meteocat.gencat.cat

The Meteorological Service of Catalonia (SMC, Servei Meteorològic de Catalunya in Catalan, also known as Meteocat) is a public company ascribed to the Department of Climate Action, Food and Rural Agenda of the Government of Catalonia (Spain). It is the organisation responsible for the observation system and meteorological forecast in Catalonia. It is an associate member of the European Meteorological Society (EMS).

== History ==
On 31 March 1921, the Permanent Council of the Commonwealth of Catalonia approved the decree that established the Meteorological Service of Catalonia (SMC), and Eduard Fontserè was appointed director. The Commonwealth bore the operating and installation costs, and the SMC was placed under the scientific authority of the Institute for Catalan Studies.

The head office of the SMC was located on the top floor of the Industrial School's clock building. From there, it collected and processed information provided by voluntary observers, as well as information sent via wireless telegraphy by the Spanish state and international organizations.

Eduard Fontserè attended several International Conferences of Directors of Meteorological Services in his capacity as representative of the SMC, which was a member of the Conference of Directors, the highest governing body of the International Meteorological Organization.

From 1922 on, the SMC prepared a daily weather forecast that was posted in the public buildings and offices of the Commonwealth of Catalonia. After 1927, the weather information was broadcast on Radio Barcelona.

For the 17 years it operated, the former SMC gave meteorology in Catalonia an enormous boost and, through a number of scientifically valuable contributions, it gained considerable international acclaim. Its international contributions include its involvement in the creation of the International Atlas of Clouds and of States of the Sky, its contribution to International Polar Year (1932–33) with the creation of two high-mountain observatories in Sant Jeroni (Montserrat) and El Turó de l'Home (Montseny), and the design of Jardi's pluviometer. In 1939, however, the SMC was abolished and its archives and premises seized.

Later, in keeping with Catalonia's time-honoured meteorological tradition, Article 9.15 of the 1979 Statute of Autonomy gave the Catalan government sole responsibility for the SMC, subject to the provisions of Article 149.1.20 of the Constitution. In response, in 1996 the Executive Council of Catalonia created the Meteorology Service of Catalonia as an administrative body under the Directorate-General for Environmental Quality of the then Department of the Environment.

The archives of the former SMC were returned to the Catalan government in 1983. These archives, which contained meteorological data, administrative documents, correspondence and a huge amount of graphic documentation, were catalogued years later, and have been stored and available for public viewing in the map library of the Cartographic and Geological Institute of Catalonia since 2003.

The approval of Meteorology Law 15/2001 of 14 November involved the re-establishment of the Meteorological Service of Catalonia as a legally independent entity.

Article 144.5 of the 2006 Statute of Autonomy, which followed up on the previous laws, stipulates that the Catalan government is responsible for establishing its own meteorological service, and goes on to list its other meteorology-related duties.

=== The Meteorological Service of Catalonia (1921-1939): International Presence ===
The agreements reached at the 1919 Paris Conference played a significant role in the creation of the SMC. It was necessary to establish a research centre attached to Catalonia's public agencies in order to study meteorology and climate in the region, with links to the IMO to ensure it followed world meteorology guidelines.

Thus, Fontserè represented the SMC at the International Conferences of Directors of Meteorological Services held in Utrecht in 1923 and in Copenhagen in 1929, as a representative of the SMC, a member of the Conference of Directors, the highest governing body of the IMO.

=== From 1921 to the Present ===
On 31 March 1921, the Permanent Council of the Commonwealth of Catalonia approved the decree that established the Meteorological Service of Catalonia (SMC) under the scientific authority of the Institute for Catalan Studies. Eduard Fontserè was appointed director. The service initially consisted of a head office that coordinated information provided by voluntary observers and information sent via wireless telegraphy by the Spanish state and international organizations. From 1922 on, members of the SMC prepared a daily weather forecast that was posted in Barcelona's public buildings and in phone booths belonging to the Commonwealth of Catalonia's telephone network. In 1939, the Meteorological Service of Catalonia was abolished and its archives and library seized.

In accordance with the Statute of Autonomy of Catalonia (Article 9.15), the Catalan government has sole responsibility for the Meteorological Service of Catalonia. To that end, the Executive Council of Catalonia created the Meteorology Service as part of the Department of the Environment in July 1996.

Article 11 of the Meteorology Service. The duties of the Meteorology Service are as follows:

- To plan, implement and manage a network of meteorological facilities.
- To plan, implement and manage a system for predicting the behaviour of weather events.
- To process, exploit and disseminate the data generated by the meteorological facilities and prediction system.
- To carry out studies and propose measures necessary to improve climate knowledge.
- To assist and work with public authorities and institutions and other users that require meteorological information.
- To participate in the creation of a weather map of Catalonia.

Decree 272/1996 of 23 July. Through Resolution 184/V, of 17 October 1996, the Parliament of Catalonia urges the government to request that the state transfer the Meteorology Service to the Catalan government.

=== Meteorology Law 15/2001, of 14 November ===
On 14 November 2001, the Catalan Parliament approved the Meteorology Law, which created the Meteorological Service of Catalonia as a public-law entity of the Catalan government, with a legally independent structure, attached to the Department of the Environment. The purpose of this Law was to establish and regulate the instruments required to guarantee quality meteorological information within the framework of the Catalan government's meteorology-related duties, and to respond to the need for meteorological and climate-related information as an essential element for providing meteorological support, advice and information within the scope of the Catalan government. The Meteorological Service of Catalonia Changes its Legal Status

On 1 August 2002, the Meteorological Service of Catalonia became a fully fledged public company attached to the Department of the Environment. To mark the occasion, it recovered its 1921 name (Meteorological Service of Catalonia), changed its logo to the one that currently appears on this website and rebranded itself as METEOCAT (Meteorology of Catalonia), a brand name that was kindly donated by ACOM (the Catalan Association of Meteorological Observers). ACOM had been using the brand for the organization of its annual meteorological conference. Later, in mid-2006, the Meteorological Service of Catalonia obtained the .cat domain and rebranded itself as METEO.CAT, which is also its website address. Following the change in government at the end of December 2010, and in accordance with Decree 200/2010, of 27 December, on the creation, naming and establishment of the scope of authority of the ministries of the government of Catalonia, and Decree 44/2011, of 4 January, on the restructuring of the Department of Territory and Sustainability, the Meteorological Service of Catalonia was placed under the authority of the Department of Territory and Sustainability.
