= Thomas Township =

Thomas Township may refer to:

== Canada ==
- Thomas Township, Cochrane District, Ontario

== United States ==
- Thomas Township, Ellsworth County, Kansas
- Thomas Township, Saginaw County, Michigan
- Thomas Township, Ripley County, Missouri
- Thomas Township, Johnston County, Oklahoma

== See also ==
- Thomas (disambiguation)
