= Tom tom =

Tom tom or TomTom may refer to:

- Tom-tom, a cylindrical drum with no snare
- TomTom, a Dutch manufacturer of navigation systems
- Tom Tom (TV series), a 1960s science-themed children's television series on BBC TV
- Project Tom-Tom, a fighter plane experiment after the FICON project
- Tom Tom Magazine, a quarterly about women drummers

== See also ==
- Tom Tom Club, a New Wave band
  - Tom Tom Club (album), an album by Tom Tom Club
- Tom Tom Blues, an album by The 77s
- "Tom Tom Tom", a Finnish entry in the Eurovision Song Contest 1973 by Marion Rung
- "Tom, Tom, the Piper's Son", a nursery rhyme
- Tommy & the Tom Toms, an American musical group active 1959-1962
