= Joan Rossell =

Spanish composer

Joan Rossell (1724–1780) was a Spanish composer, born into a musical family in Barcelona where his grandfather had played in the chapel of the cathedral, his father was a singer, and his brothers played violin the best orchestras of the country. In 1748 he became maestro de capilla at the Palacio Real de La Almudaina/Royal Palace of La Almudaina and later had the same position at the Cathedral of Toledo, where he was succeeded by another Catalan, Francesc Juncà (1742–1833). In his youth, Rossell composed in the style of the Spanish baroque, but in Mallorca he increasingly adopted the modern, gallant style.

== Works, editions, recordings ==
- Third Lamentation for Holy Thursday. With works by Francisco Valls, Tomàs Milans Zarzuela al Santísimo, Antonio Literes, Josep Carcoler. Mapa Harmónico dir. Francesc Bonastre. Columna Musica 2005.
- Salve Regina for soprano and contralto. Orquestra de Cambra Catalana, Label: La mà de guido (2007) and Ensemble Resonanz, Label: harmonia mundi (2021). Until the late 20th century this work had been attributed to Giovanni Battista Pergolesi. English music publisher Robert Bremner (after editing it slightly himself) sold it as a supposed composition by Pergolesi.
