= TOMM40L =

Protein-coding gene in humans

Identifiers
- Aliases: TOMM40L, TOMM40B, translocase of outer mitochondrial membrane 40 like
- External IDs: MGI: 3589112; GeneCards: TOMM40L

Gene location (Human)
Chr.	Chromosome 1 (human)
Band	1q23.3	Start	161,225,939 bp
Band	1q23.3	End	161,230,746 bp

Gene location (Mouse)
Chr.	Chromosome 1 (mouse)
Band	1|1 H3	Start	171,043,580 bp
Band	1|1 H3	End	171,050,083 bp
RNA expression pattern
Bgee	Human / Mouse (ortholog); Top expressed in: myocardium of left ventricle; apex of heart; right lobe of liver; prefrontal cortex; right auricle of heart; right frontal lobe; dorsolateral prefrontal cortex; anterior cingulate cortex; mucosa of transverse colon; Brodmann area 9 / Top expressed in: interventricular septum; otic vesicle; dentate gyrus of hippocampal formation granule cell; saccule; superior frontal gyrus; muscle of thigh; visual cortex; motor neuron; otic placode; extraocular muscle; More reference expression data
BioGPS	n/a
Gene ontology
Molecular function	porin activity; molecular function; protein transmembrane transporter activity; mitochondrion targeting sequence binding; preprotein binding
Cellular component	integral component of membrane; mitochondrial outer membrane; pore complex; mitochondrion; membrane; mitochondrial outer membrane translocase complex; protein-containing complex
Biological process	protein transport; ion transport; transmembrane transport; biological process; protein import into mitochondrial matrix
Sources:Amigo / QuickGO
Orthologs
Databases	NCBI: entry; OMA: entry
Species	Human	Mouse
Entrez	84134	641376
Ensembl	ENSG00000158882	ENSMUSG00000005674
UniProt	Q969M1	Q9CZR3
RefSeq (mRNA)	NM_001286373; NM_001286374; NM_032174	NM_001037170
RefSeq (protein)	NP_001273302; NP_001273303; NP_115550	NP_001032247
Location (UCSC)	Chr 1: 161.23 – 161.23 Mb	Chr 1: 171.04 – 171.05 Mb
PubMed search
- Wikidata
View/Edit Human	View/Edit Mouse

Mitochondrial import receptor subunit TOM40B is a protein that in humans is encoded by the TOMM40L gene.
