= Thomas, Virginia =

Unincorporated community in Virginia, United States

Coordinates: 37°20′42″N 82°10′04″W

Thomas is an unincorporated community in Buchanan County, Virginia, United States.

== History ==
Thomas was named for John Thomas, a railroad official.
