= Tomm Polos =

American actor, humorist and writer (born 1988)

- Born: Thomas Polos; April 17, 1988 (age 38)
- Occupations: Actor, humorist and writer
- Known for: Owen on the Move
- Website: thepolosgrounds.com

Thomas Polos (born April 17, 1988) is an American actor, humorist and writer best known for his role as Owen on the Move in a series of AT&T television commercials.

== Early life ==
Polos was born and raised in Katonah, New York. He is an alumnus of the British American Drama Academy and the USC School of Dramatic Arts, where he earned his BFA. While at USC, he served as Tommy Trojan for the men's basketball team, accompanying them to the Sweet Sixteen, wrote songs with visiting faculty member Jason Robert Brown, and was elected commencement speaker for his Bachelor of Fine Arts program.

== Career ==
Polos has expressed his approach to his career as "being Tomm for a living", working across a range of media platforms as a content creator, spokesman, and public personality. In his role as AT&T spokesperson Owen on the Move, he regularly appeared on television and hosted events at Yankee Stadium, Oracle Park, the NCAA basketball Final Four, and the Tribeca Film Festival among others. He has also consulted for organizations and creators on various content platforms through his consulting firm K.B.Z.N.

Polos' works have been reported on by the New York Post, CBS Radio, TMZ.com and Time magazine.

In 2024, Polos became USC's first full-time appointment in Creator Arts as the Rodric David Chair of Creator Arts at the School of Dramatic Arts. In the role, Polos seeks to "future proof" students to find opportunities in the modern creative landscape by "repurposing the power of story using new technologies." The curriculum, which was taken by 200 students as of 2025, includes classes such as Creator as Entrepreneur and the History of Content Creation. Polos is also responsible for running the USC Institute for Actor-Driven Innovation, which launched in April 2026 within the School of Dramatic Arts.

Polos has advocated for Camp Sunshine, a retreat for children with terminal illnesses in Casco, Maine and has participated in endurance events to raise money and awareness for the program and other charities.

Polos serves as the Los Angeles Dodgers’ official "hype man," whose "boundless enthusiasm and witty motivational energy" was noted as a "constant feature" of the team’s 2025 season. Dodgers player Enrique Hernández described Polos as "electric" and "the life of the stadium" in a behind-the-scenes video published by the Player's Tribune.
