= Tomsen =

Tomsen is a surname. Notable people with the surname include:

- Peter Tomsen (born 1940), American diplomat and educator
- Walter Tomsen (1912–2000), American sports shooter
