= Thomasville =

Thomasville may refer to:

- Thomasville, Alabama
- Thomasville, Georgia
- Thomasville, Iowa
- Thomasville, Missouri
- Thomasville, North Carolina
- Thomasville, Pennsylvania

== Other uses ==
- Thomasville Furniture Industries, a company named after Thomasville, North Carolina
