= H. Tomàs Padilla =

American politician

Hector Tomàs Padilla served as the first Latino city commissioner of Pontiac, Michigan. During his tenure from 1975 to 1983, he was the only Latino commissioner of the city. He risked his life during the school bus bombings on 31 August 1971. He suffered a heart attack at age 48. His legacy was the impetus behind the formation of the Pontiac Hispanic History Preservation Project.

== Early life ==
Padilla was born in Puerto Rico and moved to Pontiac in 1953. He secured a job delivering mail for the school district of the city of Pontiac. During this time there was a bombing 10 school buses by the Ku Klux Klan during which he and seven others (Loren Spangler, Mordica J. Barefoot, W. K. Skelton, Wilbur Johnson, George Jones, Charles Spain, and Norman Brower) entered buses of their own volition to move them away from the resulting fire.

== Legacy ==
Padilla's wife, Martha, says she was trying to organize her husband's old papers. Padilla had passed on and she felt that the history contained in papers from his tenure as the first Latino city commissioner, as well as lobbying for migrant worker conditions and his efforts in forming the Hispanic Congressional Caucus, were important to the community and needed to be put somewhere. This led to the formation of the Pontiac Hispanic History Preservation Project.
