= Tomi Nyman =

Finnish former footballer (born 1983)

Personal information
- Date of birth: 20 August 1983 (age 43)
- Place of birth: Helsinki, Finland
- Height: 1.88 m (6 ft 2 in)
- Position: Centre back

Youth career
- Jokrut

Senior career*
Years	Team	Apps	(Gls)
2003	Jokerit	10	(0)
2004–2005	Honka		
2005–2006	Omniworld	21	(0)
2007	Atlantis	23	(1)
2008–2011	Viikingit	94	(15)
2012–2013	PK-35 Vantaa	44	(0)
- * Club domestic league appearances and goals

Tomi Nyman (born 20 August 1983) is a Finnish former professional footballer who played as a centre back. Besides his native Finland, Nyman played in the Dutch Eerste Divisie for Omniworld in 2005–2006.

Nyman has graduated as MBA at the Helsinki School of Economics.
