= Tomson =

Tomson is both a surname and a given name. Notable people with the name include:

== Surname ==
- Arthur Tomson (1859–1905), English artist
- Chris Tomson (b. 1984), American musician
- Jack Tomson (1918–2001), British hockey player
- Laurence Tomson (1539–1608), secretary of state to Elizabeth I of England
- Philippa Tomson (born 1978), British newsreader
- Priit Tomson (b. 1942), Estonian basketball player
- Richard Tomson, British sailor
- Shaun Tomson (born 1955), South African world champion surfer, environmentalist, and businessman
- William Tomson (1842–1882), English cricketer

== Given name ==
- Tomson Highway (born 1951), Cree playwright, novelist, and children's author
