= Tuma, Russia =

Tuma (Russian: Тума) is the name of several inhabited localities in Russia.

Urban localities

- Tuma, Ryazan Oblast, a work settlement in Klepikovsky District of Ryazan Oblast

Abolished localities

- Tuma, Vladimir Oblast, a rural locality (a selo) in Yuryev-Polsky District of Vladimir Oblast; abolished in February 2011
