= Tomi Ståhlhammar =

Finnish ice hockey player

- Born: March 9, 1988 (age 38) Turku, Finland
- Height: 5 ft 11 in (180 cm)
- Weight: 179 lb (81 kg; 12 st 11 lb)
- Position: Right wing
- Shoots: Left
- SM-liiga team: Blues, Espoo
- NHL draft: Undrafted
- Playing career: 2008–present

Tomi Ståhlhammar (born March 9, 1988) is a Finnish professional ice hockey player who is currently playing for Espoon Blues in the SM-liiga.
