= Tomás (surname) =

Tomás is a Spanish, Portuguese, or Irish surname, equivalent of Thomas.

It may refer to:

- Américo Tomás (1894–1987), president of Portugal from 1958 to 1974
- Antonio Tomás (born 1985), professional Spanish footballer
- Belarmino Tomás (1892–1950), Asturian trade unionist and socialist politician
- Fray Tomás de Berlanga (1487–1551), fourth bishop of Panama
- Joan Tomás Campasol (born 1985), Spanish footballer
- João Tomás (born 1975), Portuguese footballer
- José Tomás Boves (1782–1814), Spanish military leader in the Venezuelan war of Independence
- José Tomás Ovalle (circa 1788–1831), Chilean political figure
- José Tomás Sánchez (1920–2012), Roman Catholic archbishop and Cardinal Priest
- José Tomás (1934–2001), Spanish classical guitarist and teacher
- Juan Tomás Ávila Laurel (born 1966), Annobonese writer
- Juan Tomás de Rocaberti (circa 1624–1699), Spanish theologian
- Paula Tomás (born 2001), Spanish footballer
- Raúl de Tomás (born 1994), Spanish football player
