= Tomas (given name) =

Tomas (Swedish pronunciation: [ˈtʊ̌mːas; ˈtʊ̂m-] or [ˈtǔːmas; ˈtûː-]) is a Swedish and Lithuanian given name.

It may refer to:

- Tomas Antonelius (born 1973), Swedish footballer
- Tomas Baranauskas (born 1973), Lithuanian historian
- Tomas Behrend (born 1974), Brazilian/German tennis player
- Tomas Brolin (born 1969), Swedish football player
- Tomas Luiz da Conceição (1703–1744), Roman Catholic prelate
- Tomas Danilevičius (born 1978), Lithuanian football player
- Tomas Davulis (born 1975), Lithuanian labour law scholar
- Tomas Delininkaitis (born 1982), Lithuanian basketball player
- Tomas Gadeikis (born 1984), Lithuanian sprint canoer
- Tomas Gustafson (born 1959), Swedish speed skater
- Tomas Haake (born 1971), Swedish drummer
- Tomas Holmström (born 1973), Swedish ice hockey player
- Tomas Intas (born 1981), Lithuanian javelin thrower
- Tomas Kančelskis (born 1975), Lithuanian football player
- Tomas Kaukėnas (born 1990), Lithuanian biathlete
- Tomas Kronståhl (born 1967), Swedish politician, Social Democrat
- Tomas Ledin (born 1952), Swedish singer, songwriter, guitarist and producer
- Tomas Lindberg (born 1972), Swedish musician
- Tomas Masiulis (born 1975), Lithuanian basketball player
- Tomas Pačėsas (born 1971), Lithuanian basketball player
- Tomas Radzinevičius (born 1981), Lithuanian football player
- Tomas Ramelis (born 1971), Lithuanian football (soccer) forward
- Tomas Ražanauskas (born 1976), Lithuanian football player
- Tomas Rudin (born 1965), Swedish politician, Social Democrat
- Tomas Scheckter (born 1980), South African racing driver
- Tomas Tamošauskas (born 1983), Lithuanian football player
- Tomas Tobé (born 1978), Swedish politician, Moderate
- Tomas Vaitkus (born 1982), Lithuanian cyclist
- Tomas Walsh (born 1992), New Zealand shot putter
- Tomas Žiukas (born 1970), Lithuanian football player
- Tomas Žvirgždauskas (born 1975), Lithuanian football player

== See also ==
- Snowsnaps, one of the main characters is named Tomas
- Tomas (Riftwar Cycle), fictional character in books by Raymond E. Feist
