= Tommie =

Tommie is a masculine given name of English origin, occasionally a nickname or shortened form of Thomas, and is sometimes used as a feminine form of Thomas. Notable people with the name include:

== Notable men with the given name ==
- Tommie Aaron (1939–1984), first baseman and left fielder in Major League Baseball
- Tommie Agee (1942–2001), Major League Baseball center fielder
- Tommie Agee (American football) (born 1964), former American National Football League running back
- Tommie Bass (1908–1996) Appalachian herbalist who lived near Lookout Mountain, Alabama
- Tommie Burton (1878–1946), West Indian cricketer
- Tommie Connor (1904–1993), British songwriter
- Tommie Eriksson, musician who played in the symphonic metal band Therion
- Tommie Frazier (born 1974), former college football quarterback
- Tommie Gorman (born 1956), Irish journalist
- Tommie Harris (born 1983), American National Football League defensive tackle
- Tommie Hill (born 1985), American football defensive end
- Tommie Lindsey (born 1951), American high school public speaking coach
- Tommie Reynolds (born 1941), former Major League Baseball outfielder
- Tommie Shelby, philosopher and writer
- Tommie Sisk (born 1942), former right-handed Major League Baseball pitcher
- Tommie Smith (born 1944), African American former track & field athlete
- Tommie Sunshine, record producer, remixer, DJ and electronic music songwriter Thomas Lorello
- Tommie van der Leegte (born 1977), retired Dutch footballer

== Notable women with the given name ==
- Tommie Barfield (1888–1949), the first school superintendent of Collier County, Florida
- Tommie Dora Barker (1888–1978), American librarian
- Tommie Brown (1934–2026), former representative of Chattanooga to the Tennessee state legislature
- Tommie Manderson (1912–2015), English make-up artist
- Tommie Moore (1917–2004), American actress
- Tommie Morton-Young, American educator, activist, author, historian
- Tommie-Amber Pirie, Canadian actress
- Tommie Young (born 1949), American soul and gospel singer from Dallas, Texas

== See also ==
- Tommy (disambiguation)
