= Tomáš =

Tomáš (Czech pronunciation: [ˈtomaːʃ]) is a Czech and Slovak given name, equivalent to the name Thomas. Tomáš is also a surname (feminine: Tomášová). Notable people with the name include:

== Given name ==
=== Sport ===
- Tomáš Berdych (born 1985), Czech tennis player
- Tomáš Chorý (born 1995), Czech footballer
- Tomáš Cibulec (born 1978), Czech tennis player
- Tomáš Čvančara (born 2000), Czech footballer
- Tomáš Dvořák (born 1972), Czech athlete
- Tomáš Enge (born 1976), Czech motor racing driver
- Tomáš Fleischmann (born 1984), Czech ice hockey player
- Tomáš Holeš (born 1993), Czech footballer
- Tomáš Hübschman (born 1981), Czech footballer
- Tomáš Kaberle (born 1978), Czech ice hockey player
- Tomáš Klíma (born 1990), Slovak ice hockey player
- Tomáš Kopecký (born 1982), Slovak ice hockey player
- Tomáš Kramný (born 1973), Czech ice hockey player
- Tomáš Kratochvíl (born 1971), Czech race walker
- Tomas Mezera (born 1958), Czech-Australian racing driver
- Tomáš Oravec (born 1980), Slovak footballer
- Tomáš Plekanec (born 1982), Czech ice hockey player
- Tomáš Řepka (born 1974), Czech footballer
- Tomáš Rigo (born 2002), Slovak footballer
- Tomáš Rosický (born 1980), Czech footballer
- Tomáš Satoranský (born 1991), Czech basketball player
- Tomáš Šmíd (born 1956), Czech tennis player
- Tomáš Souček (born 1995), Czech footballer
- Tomáš Surový (born 1981), Slovak ice hockey player
- Tomáš Suslov (born 2002), Slovak footballer
- Tomáš Tatar (born 1990), Slovak ice hockey player
- Tomáš Ujfaluši (born 1978), Czech footballer
- Tomáš Vaclík (born 1989), Czech footballer
- Tomáš Verner (born 1986), Czech figure skater
- Tomáš Vincour (born 1990), Czech ice hockey player
- Tomáš Vokoun (born 1976), Czech ice hockey player
- Tomáš Zíb (born 1976), Czech tennis player

=== Other ===
- Tomáš Baťa (1876–1932), Czech entrepreneur
- Tomáš Jan Baťa, anglicized as Thomas J. Bata (1914–2008), Czech-Canadian entrepreneur and philanthropist
- Tomáš Drucker (born 1978), Slovak politician
- Tomáš Hellebrandt (born 1982), Slovak economist and politician
- Tomáš Janovic (1937–2023), Slovak writer
- Tomas Kalnoky (born 1980), Czech-American singer and guitarist
- Tomáš Garrigue Masaryk (1850–1937), first President of Czechoslovakia
- Tomáš Matonoha (born 1971), Czech actor
- Tomáš Štítný ze Štítného (c. 1333 – 1401/1409), Czech nobleman and writer
- Tomáš Sträussler (1937–2025), the original Czech name of the British playwright, Sir Tom Stoppard
- Tomáš Svoboda (1939–2022), French-born Czech-American classical composer
- Tomáš Töpfer (born 1951), Czech actor and politician
- Tomáš Valášek (born 1972), Slovak politician

== Surname ==
- Marie Tomášová (1929–2025), Czech actress
