= Tommy =

Tommy may refer to:

== People and fictional characters ==
- Tommy (given name), a list of people and fictional characters
- Tommy Atkins, or just Tommy, a slang term for a common soldier in the British Army
- Liesl Tommy, South African-American theatrical and film director
- Mikaela Tommy (born 1995), Canadian alpine ski racer
- Tommy Giacomelli (born 1974), Brazilian former footballer also known as simply Tommy
- Tommy Z, American electric blues guitarist, singer, songwriter, record producer and audio engineer Tommy Zabielski (fl. 1990s–present)
- Tommy the Clown, American dancer Thomas Johnson (born 1969), inventor of the "clowning" style of dance

== Arts and entertainment ==
=== Film and television ===
- Tommy (1931 film), a Soviet drama film
- Tommy (1975 film), a British operetta film based on the Who's album Tommy
- Tommy (2015 film), a Telugu drama film
- Tommy (TV series), a 2020 American drama series

=== Music ===
- Tommy (The Who album), 1969
  - Tommy (London Symphony Orchestra album), 1972
  - Tommy (soundtrack), a soundtrack to the 1975 film
  - The Who's Tommy, a stage production, premiered 1992
    - The Who's Tommy (original Broadway cast recording), a 1993 album containing a recording of the above musical made by its 1993 Broadway cast
- Tommy (The Wedding Present album), 1988
- Tommy (Dosh album), 2010
- Tommy (EP), a 2017 EP by Klein
- Tommy, a 2022 EP by Kiesza
- Tommy, a 1965 album by Tommy Adderley
- Tommy, a 1970 EP by The Who
- "Tommy", a 1991 song by Status Quo from the album Rock 'til You Drop

=== Poetry ===
- Tommy (King poem), by Stephen King, 2010
- Tommy (Kipling poem), by Rudyard Kipling, 1892

=== Other uses in arts and entertainment ===
- Tommy, a 1927 play, the basis of the 1930 film She's My Weakness
- Tommy (statue), a statue of a Great War soldier in Seaham, England

== Other uses ==
- Tommy (pigeon), who received the Dickin Medal in 1946
- British Rail Class 76, an electric locomotive, the prototype of which was named "Tommy"
- Thomson's gazelle, an animal known as a "tommy"
- Quarry Tommy a slate quarry near Cilgerran, Wales
- Thompson submachine gun, also known as the "tommy gun"
- Tommy's (charity), associated with St Thomas' Hospital, London

== See also ==
- Tommie, a given name
- Apache TomEE, the Java Enterprise Edition of Apache Tomcat
- Tomm (disambiguation)
- Thomas (disambiguation)
