= Thomasson =

Thomasson is a surname. Notable people with the surname include:

- Benny Thomasson (1909–1984), American fiddler
- Franklin Thomasson (1873–1941), English 20th century MP
- Gary Thomasson (born 1951), American former professional baseball player
- Hughie Thomasson (1952–2007), American guitarist and singer
- Joe Thomasson (born 1993), American professional basketball player
- John Pennington Thomasson (1841–1904), English cotton spinner and Liberal Party politician
- Noah Thomasson (born 2001), American college basketball player
- Sarah Thomasson (1925–1996), Swedish-Southern Saami alpine skier
- Thomas Thomasson (1808–1876), political economist
- William Thomasson (1797–1882), U.S. Representative from Kentucky

== Fictional characters ==
- Ben and Theresa Thomasson, characters in the American romantic comedy-drama television series Men in Trees
