= Tom (given name) =

- Gender: Male
- Language: Aramaic

Origin
- Derivation: Thomas

Tom is a masculine given name, often used as a diminutive of Thomas. In Germanic countries and Scandinavia, "Tom" is in use as a formal given name.

The Gaelic-Cymric name Tom means "rising ground" or "eminent". In literature and popular culture, it is often used to represent "an ordinary man". The name Tôm also exists as an independent Aramaic name.

== Disambiguation pages ==
- Tom Ackerman
- Tom Adams (disambiguation)
- Tom Anderson (disambiguation)
- Tom Arnold (disambiguation)
- Tom Austin
- Tom Baker (disambiguation)
- Tom Beck
- Tom Bell (disambiguation)
- Tom Briggs
- Tom Brown (disambiguation)
- Tom Browne (disambiguation)
- Tom Carter
- Tom Chambers (disambiguation)
- Tom Clark (disambiguation)
- Tom Clements
- Tom Cochran (disambiguation)
- Tom Collins (disambiguation)
- Tom Cotter (disambiguation)
- Tom Crean
- Tom Curran (disambiguation)
- Tom Daly (disambiguation)
- Tom Dixon (disambiguation)
- Tom Dooley (disambiguation)
- Tom Erlandson
- Tom Fisher
- Tom Fitzsimmons
- Tom Fletcher (disambiguation)
- Tom Friedman
- Tom Gilmartin (disambiguation)
- Tom Green (disambiguation)
- Tom Harris (disambiguation)
- Tom Hayes (disambiguation)
- Tom Holland (disambiguation)
- Tom Hooper
- Tom Jennings (disambiguation)
- Tom Jones (disambiguation)
- Tom Keen (disambiguation)
- Tom Kennedy (disambiguation)
- Tom Kenny (disambiguation)
- Tom Kirby (disambiguation)
- Tom Knowles
- Tom Lee (disambiguation)
- Tom Lewis (disambiguation)
- Tom Lloyd (disambiguation)
- Tom Long (disambiguation)
- Tom Marshall (disambiguation)
- Tom Miller (disambiguation)
- Tom Morris (disambiguation)
- Tom Mullen (disambiguation)
- Tom Murphy (disambiguation)
- Tom Murray
- Tom Newman
- Tom Parker (disambiguation)
- Tom Price (disambiguation)
- Tom Quinn
- Tom Ray (disambiguation)
- Tom Richards
- Tom Rooney (disambiguation)
- Tom Scott (disambiguation)
- Tom Shaw
- Tom Simpson (disambiguation)
- Tom Sloan (disambiguation)
- Tom Smith (disambiguation)
- Tom Swift
- Tom Taylor (disambiguation)
- Tom Thomas
- Tom Tierney
- Tom Vaughn
- Tom Walters (disambiguation)
- Tom Williams (disambiguation)
- Tom Wright (disambiguation)
- Tom Young

== Sportsmen ==
- Tom (footballer, born 1985), Brazilian footballer
- Tom (footballer, born 1986), Brazilian footballer
- Tom (footballer, born 1988), Brazilian footballer
- Tom (footballer, born 1991), Brazilian footballer
- Tom Ashworth (born 1977), American former football offensive tackle
- Tom Aspinall (born 1993), English professional mixed martial artist
- Tom Bender (sportscaster) (1925–1995), American radio and television sportscaster
- Tom Berry (rugby union) (1911–1993), English rugby union player and administrator
- Tom Brady (born 1977), American football player best known for playing with the New England Patriots
- Tom Brandi (born 1966), American professional wrestler
- Tom Brown (footballer, born 1919) (1919–2000), Scottish footballer
- Tom Brown (footballer, born 1968), Scottish former footballer
- Tom Brown (outfielder) (1860–1927), American baseball player and manager
- Tom Brown (safety) (born 1940), American baseball outfielder and first baseman, football player
- Tom Brown (pitcher) (born 1949), American baseball pitcher
- Tom Brown (tackle) (1890–1972), American football player
- Tom Brown (end) (1921–2013), American football player in the NFL
- Tom Brown (guard) (born 1936), American football player in the CFL
- Tom Brown (safety) (born 1940), American athlete who played football in the NFL and baseball in MLB
- Tom Brown (wide receiver) (born 1963), American football player in the NFL
- Tom Brown (running back) (born 1964), American football player in the NFL
- Tom Brown (rugby, born 1983), English rugby union and rugby league player
- Tom Brown (rugby union, born 1990), Scottish rugby union player
- Tom Brown (bowls) (1915–1980), England lawn bowls competitor
- Tom Brown (tennis) (1922–2011), American tennis player
- Tom Brown (Australian footballer) (born 2003), Australian rules football player
- Tom Browning (1960–2022), American professional baseball pitcher
- Tom Burton (1961–2010), American professional wrestler
- Tom Cannon (1852–19??), British professional wrestler
- Tom Cannon (born 2002), English is a professional footballer
- Tom Cutler (born 1995), Australian rules footballer
- Tom Daley (born 1994), English diver
- Tom Dickinson (American football) (1897–1999), American football player
- Tom Dradiga (born 1996), Ugandan middle-distance runner
- Tom Drake (baseball) (1912–1988), American Major League Baseball right-handed pitcher
- Tom Drake (wrestler) (1930–2017), American professional wrestler
- Tom Dwan (born 1986), American poker player
- Tom Emson (born 2002), British racing driver
- Tom Finney (1922–2014), English international association footballer
- Tom Gamboa (born 1948), American baseball coach and manager
- Tom Gilson (American football) (born 1988), American football
- Tom Goodwin (born 1968), American professional baseball player
- Tom Gordon (born 1967), American former professional baseball right-handed pitcher and current radio color commentator
- Tom Griffin (baseball) (born 1948), American former professional baseball pitcher
- Tom Hardy (soccer), American soccer defender
- Tom Heinsohn (1934–2020), American professional basketball player
- Tom Hoover (basketball) (born 1941), American former professional basketball player
- Tom Howard (wrestler) (born 1969), American professional wrestler
- Tom Hubert (born 1964), American road course racer
- Tom Humble (born 1988), Australian Rugby League player
- Tom Jenkins (baseball) (1898–1979), American baseball player
- Tom Jenkins (golfer) (born 1947), American golfer
- Tom Jenkins (wrestler) (1872–1957), American professional wrestler
- Tom Johnson (ice hockey) (1928–2007), Canadian professional ice hockey player
- Tom Kingston (rugby union) (born 1991), Australian rugby union player
- Tom Konchalski (1947–2021), American basketball scout
- Tom Landry (1924–2000), American Football coach for the Dallas Cowboys
- Tom Lawlor, (born 1983), American professional wrestler, retired mixed martial artist
- Tom Leppard (1936–2016), English soldier best known as the most tattooed senior citizen
- Tom Maayan (born 1993), Israeli basketball player in the Israeli National League
- Tom Magee (born 1958), Canadian powerlifter and pro wrestler
- Tom Marsh (baseball) (born 1965), Major League Baseball player
- Tom McKean (born 1963), Scottish former middle-distance runner who won the European Championships 800 m gold medal at Split in 1990
- Tom Mees (1949–1996), American sports broadcaster
- Tom Murphy (catcher) (born 1991), American baseball player
- Tom Okker (born 1944), Dutch tennis player
- Tom Paradise, American geomorphologist
- Tom Peck (born 1953), American racing driver
- Tom Platz (born 1955), American retired professional bodybuilder
- Tom Pratt (American football) (born 1935), American football coach
- Tom Prichard (born 1959), American retired professional wrestler
- Tom Pritchard (1917–2017), New Zealand cricketer
- Tom Prince (bodybuilder) (1968–2022), American professional bodybuilder
- Tom Re (1913–1996), Australian rules footballer
- Tom Rehder (born 1965), American football player
- Tom Reuveny (born 2000), Israeli Olympic champion windsurfing sailor
- Tom Rockliff (born 1990), Australian rules footballer
- Tom Sellers (athlete), American wheelchair racer
- Tom Stolhandske (born 1931), American football player
- Tom Stone, American retired professional wrestler
- Tom Sunkel (1912–2002), American professional baseball player
- Tom Symonds (born 1989), Australian Rugby League player
- Tom Tavares (born 1987), Cape Verdean footballer
- Tom Trbojevic (born 1996), Australian rugby league player
- Tom Voyce (1981–2024), English rugby union player
- Tom Vu (born 1957), Vietnamese American poker player, real estate investor and speaker
- Tom Watson (fighter) (born 1982), English mixed martial artist
- Tom Whitestone (1964–2026), American coach
- Tom Yaacobov (born 1992), Israeli triple jumper
- Tom Zenk (1958–2017), American professional wrestler and bodybuilder

== Politicians ==
- Tom Ada (born 1949), Guamanian politician
- Tom Arthur (born 1985), Scottish politician
- Tom Brüntrup (born 1997), German politician
- Tom Carper (born 1947), American politician
- Tom Coburn (1948–2020), American politician and physician
- Tom Cotton (born 1977), American politician
- Tom Daschle (born 1947), American politician
- Tom DeLay (born 1947), American politician
- Tom Determann (born 1950), American politician
- Tom Harkin (born 1939), American politician
- Tom Lukiwski (born 1951), Canadian politician
- Tom Mulcair (born 1954), Canadian politician and former leader of the Opposition
- Tom Perry (politician), Canadian former politician
- Tom Russcher (born 1992), Dutch politician
- Tom Stewart (1892–1972), American politician
- Tom Suozzi (born 1962), American politician
- Tom Udall (born 1948), American politician and diplomat
- Tom van den Nieuwenhuijzen (born 1982), Dutch politician
- Tom Veen (1942–2014), Dutch politician
- Tom Wolf (born 1948), American politician

== Personalities ==
- Tom Bergeron (born 1955), American television personality and game show host
- Tom Brown (police officer) (1889–1959), American law enforcement official
- Tom Holkenborg (born 1967), Dutch DJ previously known as Junkie XL
- Tom Karen (1926–2022), British industrial designer
- Tom Marsh (astronomer) (1961–2022), British astronomer and astrophysicist
- Tom Pelphrey (born 1959), American food critic and internet personality
- Tom Ray (1919–2010), American animator
- Tom Scott (presenter), British YouTuber
- Tom Simons (born 2004), British Youtuber also known as Tommyinnit
- Tom Stafford (astronomer), American astronomer
- Tom Westman (born 1964), American firefighter and television personality

== Actors ==
- Tom Adams (actor) (1938–2014), English actor
- Tom Baker (born 1934), English actor best known for playing the Fourth Doctor in Doctor Who
- Tom Blyth (born 1995), English actor
- Tom Bosley (1927–2010), American actor
- Tom Cassell (born 1993), British YouTuber
- Tom Cruise (born 1962), American actor and film producer
- Tom Ellis (actor) (born 1978), Welsh actor
- Tom Felton (born 1987), English actor
- Tom Gilson (1934–1962), American actor
- Tom Glynn-Carney (born 1995), English actor
- Tom Green (born 1971), Canadian actor and comedian
- Tom Hanks (born 1956), American actor and filmmaker
- Tom Hardy (born 1977), English actor
- Tom Hiddleston (born 1981), English actor
- Tom Hodges (born 1965), American actor and film producer
- Tom Holland (born 1996), English actor
- Tom Hopper (born 1985), English actor
- Tom Jordan (1937–2019), Irish actor
- Tom Kane (1962–2026), American voice actor
- Tom Kenny (born 1962), American actor and comedian
- Tom Lister (born 1978), English actor
- Tom LeDuc (1957–1989), American actor and model
- Tom Maden, American actor
- Tom Mix (1880–1940), American cowboy actor
- Tom Olivar (born 1963), Filipino film actor
- Tom Oliver (born 1938), British-American retired actor
- Tom Poston (1921–2007), American actor
- Tom Rodriguez (born 1987), Filipino actor
- Tom Selleck (born 1945), American actor
- Tom Sizemore (1961–2023), American actor
- Tom Sturridge (born 1985), English actor
- Tom Welling (born 1977), American actor best known for playing Clark Kent on Smallville

== Musicians ==
- Tom Araya (born 1961), American bassist and vocalist with Slayer
- Tom Cardy (born 1994), Australian comedian, musician, songwriter, and actor
- Tom Chaplin (born 1979), British singer of Keane
- Stompin' Tom Connors (1936–2013), Canadian singer/songwriter
- Tom DeLonge (born 1975), American musician (blink-182)
- Tom Dowd (1925–2002), American sound engineer and producer for Atlantic Records
- Tom Evans (musician) (1947–1983), English musician and songwriter (Badfinger)
- Tom Fogerty (1941–1990), American guitarist for Creedence Clearwater Revival
- Tom Fowler (1951–2024), American bassist for Frank Zappa, The Mothers of Invention, It's a Beautiful Day, among others
- Tom Grennan (born 1995), English singer and songwriter
- Tom Hamilton (born 1951), American bassist (Aerosmith)
- Tom Lehrer (1928–2025), American musician, singer-songwriter, satirist, and mathematician
- Tom Jobim (1927–1994), Brazilian singer-songwriter
- Tom Jones (singer) (born 1940), Welsh singer
- Tom Kaulitz, (born 1989), German guitarist (Tokio Hotel)
- Tom Morello (born 1964), American guitarist (Rage Against the Machine and Audioslave)
- Tom Northcott (born 1943), Canadian folk-rock singer
- Tom Petersson (born 1950), American bassist (Cheap Trick)
- Tom Petty (1950–2017), American singer-songwriter and musician
- Tom Robinson (born 1950), English musician, activist and radio presenter
- Tom Skinner (born 1980), English drummer
- Tom Smothers (1937–2023), American comedian, composer, and musician (Smothers Brothers)
- Tom Verlaine (1949–2023), American guitarist for the punk band Television
- Tom Waits (born 1949), American singer-songwriter, composer, and actor
- Tom Zé (born 1936), Brazilian singer‐songwriter

== Artists ==
- Tom Allen (broadcaster) (born 1964), Canadian radio host
- Tom Allen (painter) (born 1975), American painter
- Tom Baril (born 1952), American photographer
- Tom J. Bartuska, American architect, educator, and author
- Tom Luckey (1940–2012), American architect and sculptor
- Tom Palumbo (1921–2008), Italian born, American photographer
- Tom Scutt (born 1983), British designer
- Tom Tsuchiya (born 1972), American sculptor

== Other ==
- Tom Brokaw (born 1940), American anchor for NBC
- Tom Clancy (1947–2013), American author
- Tom Crosslin (1954–2001), marijuana rights activist
- Tom DeSanto (born 1968), American film producer and screenwriter
- Tom Dolphin (born 1978/9), British anaesthetist
- Tom Freston (born 1945), American media proprietor, businessman, and financier
- Tom Fulp (born 1978), American programmer, creator of Newgrounds
- Tom Konyves (born 1947), Canadian poet, pioneer of video poetry
- Tom Hagen (born 1950), Norwegian businessman
- Tom Hooper (born 1972), British-Australian film director
- Tom Hunter (born 1961), Scottish businessman and philanthropist
- Tom Insko, American businessman and 12th president of Eastern Oregon University
- Tom Lotherington (born 1950), Norwegian writer and translator
- Tom Luse, American film producer
- Tom McGillis, Canadian producer
- Tom McLaury (1853–1881), Wild West gunfighter
- Tom Moore (1920–2021), known as Captain Tom, a British Army officer
- Tom Mylan (born 1976), American butcher, author, writer
- Tom O'Carroll (born 1945), British paedophilia advocate
- Tom Ruegger, American animator and screenwriter
- Tom Segev (born 1945), Israeli historian, author, and journalist
- Tom Six, Dutch filmmaker, writer and actor
- Tom Stone (magician), Swedish magician, editor and author
- Tom Stoppard (1937–2025), British playwright and screenwriter
- Tom Tykwer (born 1965), German film director

== Fictional characters ==
- Tom (Paralympic mascot), the official mascot of the 2016 Summer Paralympics
- TOM, several Toonami mascots and hosts
- Tom Lucitor, a character from Star vs. the Forces of Evil
- Tom, character in Bob the Builder
- Tractor Tom, the main character from the same show
- Tom Harper, the father character from an live action nickelodeon show Nicky, Ricky, Dicky & Dawn
- Tom Bombadil, a character from The Lord of the Rings and The Adventures of Tom Bombadil
- Tom Cat, a title character from Tom and Jerry
- Tom Cat, a thumb wrestler in Thumb Wrestling Federation
- Tom Canty, a title character from The Prince and the Pauper
- Tom, a character from A kind of Magic
- Tom Edison, a character in The Edison Twins
- Tom Gurney, a character in the video game Bully
- Tom, the main character from an CGI/live action Tree Fu Tom
- Dr. Tom Horton, character on the NBC soap opera Days of Our Lives
- Tom Lizard, a character in the animated film Hoppers
- Tom Nook, a character in Animal Crossing video game series
- Tom Pottage, one of the Pottage's twin in Postman Pat
- Tom Riddle, Harry Potter series villain
- Tom Sawyer, title character of The Adventures of Tom Sawyer
- Tom Servo, a robot character from the Mystery Science Theater 3000 television series
- Talking Tom, A Grey tabby cat and the main Character of the Talking Tom & Friends franchise
- Tom Thomas, character in Fireman Sam
- Tom Thumb, character of English folklore
- Tom Wachowski, a character from the Sonic The Hedgehog films, portrayed by James Marsden

== See also ==
- Tom (disambiguation)
- Tom (surname)
- Tó, nicknames
- Ton (given name)
- Tommy (disambiguation)
- Tomas (disambiguation)
