= Tommy (given name) =

Tommy is a masculine given name, frequently a short form of Thomas. An alternative spelling is Thommy.

It may refer to:

== People ==
=== Arts and entertainment ===
- Tommy Brown (singer) (1931–2016), American R&B singer
- Tommy Brown (record producer) (born 1986), American record producer
- Tommy Brown, drummer with Nero and the Gladiators and songwriter
- Tommy Cairo (born 1958), American professional wrestler
- Tommy Cannon (born 1938), British comedian
- Tommy Chong (born 1938), Canadian actor, writer, director, musician, and comedian, half of the Cheech & Chong comedy duo
- Tommy Collins (singer), stage name of American country music singer-songwriter Leonard Sipes (1930–2000)
- Tommy Cooper (1921–1984), British prop comedian and magician
- Tommy Davidson (born 1965), American actor
- Tommy DeBarge, American R'n'B musician formerly of the band Switch
- Tommy Dorfman (born 1992), American actress
- Tommy Dorsey (1905–1956), American jazz trombonist, trumpeter, composer, and bandleader of the Big Band era
- Tommy Emmanuel (born 1955), Australian guitarist
- Tommy Engel (born 1949), German musician
- Tommy February6 and Tommy Heavenly6, stage names for Japanese singer Tomoko Kawase
- Tommy Finke (born 1981), German singer/songwriter
- Tommy Flanagan (born 1965), Scottish actor
- Tommy Hilfiger (born 1951), American fashion designer
- Tommy Hunter (born 1937), Canadian country music performer, star of The Tommy Hunter Show on television
- Tommy Lee Jones (born 1946), American actor
- Tommy Keene (1958–2017), American singer-songwriter
- Tommy Knight (born 1993), English child actor
- Tommy Lee (born 1962), drummer for glam metal band Mötley Crüe
- Tommy Makem (1932–2007), Irish-American musician
- Tommy Mottola (born 1949), American music executive, former husband of Mariah Carey
- Tommy Page (1970–2017), American singer-songwriter
- Tommy Ramone (1951–2014), Hungarian-American musician and record producer, founding member of The Ramones
- Tommy Giles Rogers Jr. (born 1980), singer and keyboardist of heavy metal band Between the Buried and Me
- Tommy Rogers (wrestler) (1961–2015), American professional wrestler
- Tommy Sands (American singer) (born 1937), American pop music singer and actor
- Tommy Sands (Irish singer) (born 1945), Northern Irish folk singer, songwriter, radio broadcaster and political activist
- Tommy Shaw (born 1953), guitarist for the band Styx
- Tommy Smith (playwright), American playwright
- Tommy Smith (DJ) (born 1954), American radio disc jockey
- Tommy Smith (saxophonist) (born 1967), Scottish jazz saxophonist, composer and educator
- Tommy Sotomayor, American radio show host and YouTube personality
- Tommy Steele (born 1936), Britain's first teen idol and rock 'n' roll star
- Tommy Stinson (born 1966), American rock musician
- Tommy Trinder (1909–1989), English comedian
- Tommy Tune (born 1939), American dancer, actor
- Tommy Wiseau, American film producer/director
- Tommy Young (born 1947), American professional wrestling referee and retired professional wrestler
- Tommy Walker (events director) (1922–1986), American producer of live events
- Tommy Walker (worship leader), American composer and author

=== Crime ===
- Tommy Alexandersson (born 1948), Swedish mass murderer
- Thomas Gambino (born 1929), Italian-American mobster
- Tommy O'Connor (criminal) (1880–1951), American gangster, cop killer and fugitive
- Tommy Lynn Sells (1964–2014), American serial killer

=== Politics ===
- Tommy Burks (1940–1998), American politician
- Tommy Douglas (1904–1986), Scottish-born Canadian politician, father of universal healthcare in Canada
- Tommy Osmeña (born 1948), Filipino politician, Mayor of Cebu City
- Tommy Paradise, American politician
- Tommy Sheridan, Scottish politician
- Tommy Suharto (born 1962), Indonesian politician
- Tommy Thompson (born 1941), American politician
- Tommy Thormann (born 1994), German politician
- Tommy Walker (Australian politician) (1858–1932)

=== Sports ===
- Tommy Akingbesote (born 2003), American football player
- Tommy Alcedo (born 1976), Venezuelan road cyclist
- Tommy Asnip (1883–1918), English footballer
- Tommy Boutwell (born 1946), American football player
- Tommy Brown (footballer, born 1896) (1896–1973), Scottish footballer
- Tommy Brown (footballer, born 1897) (1897–?), English footballer
- Tommy Brown (footballer, born 1906) (1906–after 1928), English footballer
- Tommy Brown (footballer, born 1921) (1921–1966), Scottish footballer
- Tommy Brown (baseball) (1927–2025), American Major League Baseball player
- Tommy Burns (Canadian boxer) (born Noah Brusso; 1881–1955), Canadian boxer and world heavyweight champion
- Tommy Burns (1922–2011), Australian boxer and welterweight champion Geoffrey M. Murphy
- Tommy Clare (1865–1929), English footballer and manager
- Tommy Curtis (1952–2021), American basketball player
- Tommy Docherty (1928–2020), Scottish former footballer and football manager
- Tommy Doman (born 2002), American football player
- Tommy Edman (born 1995), American baseball player
- Tommy Ekblom (born 1959), Finnish long-distance runner
- Tommy Everidge (born 1983), American baseball player and coach
- Tommy Frevert (born 1986), American football player
- Tommy Giacomelli (born 1974), or simply 'Tommy', Brazilian association football player
- Tommy Green (footballer, born 1863) (1863–1923), English footballer
- Tommy Green (footballer, born 1873) (1873–1921), English footballer
- Tommy Green (footballer, born 1876) (1876–1958), English footballer
- Tommy Green (footballer, born 1893) (1893–1975), English footballer
- Tommy Green (footballer, born 1913) (1913–1997), English footballer
- Tommy Green (athlete) (1894–1975), British race walker
- Tommy Haas (born 1978), German tennis player
- Tommy Harland (born 1942), English cricketer
- Tommy Henry (American football) (born 1969), American football player
- Tommy Henry (baseball) (born 1997), American baseball player
- Tommy Hottovy (born 1981), American baseball player and coach
- Tommy Hudson (American football) (born 1997), American football player
- Tommy Hunter (baseball) (born 1986), American Major League Baseball pitcher
- Tommy Hunter (footballer) (1863–1918), English footballer
- Tommy Ivan (1911–1999), Canadian hockey coach and general manager
- Tommy Kahnle (born 1989), American baseball player
- Tommy Lasorda (1927–2021), American Major League Baseball manager and player
- Tommy La Stella (born 1989), American baseball player
- Tommy Lee (footballer) (born 1986), English goalkeeper for Chesterfield F.C.
- Tommy Lloyd (born 1974), American basketball coach
- Tommy Mellott, American football player
- Tommy Milone (born 1987), American baseball player
- Tommy Mulgrew (1929–2016), Scottish footballer
- Tommy Nance (born 1991), American baseball player
- Tommy Northcott (1931–2008), English footballer
- Tommy Paul (tennis) (born 1997), American tennis player
- Tommy Pham (born 1988), American baseball player
- Tommy Polley (born 1978), American footballer
- Tommy Robredo (born 1982), Spanish tennis player
- Tommy Romero (born 1997), American baseball player
- Tommy Rybacki (born 1986), American football player and coach
- Tommy Sale (1910–1990), English footballer
- Tom Simpson (1937–1967), British cyclist
- Tommy Sørensen (born 1979), Danish badminton player
- Tommy Sugiarto (born 1988), Indonesian badminton player
- Tommy Suggs, American football player
- Tommy Stevens (born 1996), American football player
- Tommy Sweeney (born 1997), American football player
- Tommy Thevenow (1903–1957), American baseball player
- Tommy Togiai (born 1999), American football player
- Tommy Tolleson (born 1943), American football player
- Tommy Townsend (born 1996), American football player
- Tommy Tremble (born 2000), American football player
- Tommy Walker (winger) (fl. 1891–1893), English footballer
- Tommy Walker (footballer, born 1903) (1903–?), Scottish footballer
- Tommy Walker (footballer, born 1915) (1915–1993), Scottish football player and manager
- Tommy Walker (footballer, born 1923) (1923–2005), English footballer
- Tommy Walker (footballer, born 1964), Scottish footballer
- Tommy Walker (footballer, born February 1952), English footballer
- Tommy Walker (footballer, born March 1952), Scottish footballer
- Tommy Walsh (hurler, born 1983) (born 1983), Irish hurler
- Tommy Walsh (Kerry footballer) (born 1988), Gaelic footballer and Australian rules footballer
- Tommy Walsh (Wicklow Gaelic footballer), Gaelic footballer
- Tommy Watkins (born 1980), American baseball player and coach
- Tommy Whelan (1911–1974), American football player

=== Other ===
- Tommy Brown (NAAFI assistant) (1926–1945), English recipient of the George Medal for helping to break the German Enigma code
- Thomas Ricketts (VC) (1901–1967), at age 17, the youngest soldier to be awarded the Victoria Cross as a combatant
- Tommy Pangcoga (born 1972), writer and non-government organization worker based in Mindanao
- Poltpalingada Booboorowie (c. 1830–1901), known as Tommy Walker, Australian Aboriginal personality
- Tommy Solomon (1884–1933), believed by most to have been the last true Moriori, the indigenous people of the Chatham Islands
- Tommy Walsh (builder) (born 1956), English celebrity builder

== Fictional characters ==
- Tommy Angelo, main protagonist from 2002 video game Mafia
- Tommy Carcetti, in the TV series The Wire
- Tommy Garvey, main character in HBO series The Leftovers
- Tommy Gavin, lead character in the FX drama Rescue Me
- Tommy Jarvis, recurring character in the Friday the 13th franchise
- Tommy Judd, co-protagonist of the play Another Country
- Tommy Monaghan, also known as Hitman, a super-powered assassin in DC Comics, created by Garth Ennis
- Tommy Oliver, one of the main characters from the Power Rangers TV series
- Tommy Pickles, main character in the Rugrats and All Grown Up! TV series
- Tommy Shelby, main protagonist in British television series Peaky Blinders
- Tommy Settergren, a Pippi Longstocking character
- Tommy Shepherd, a.k.a. Speed, a Marvel Comics superhero
- Tommy Solomon (3rd Rock from the Sun), one of the main characters from the sitcom
- Tommy Tomkins, title character of Tailspin Tommy, an American comic strip
- Tommy Vercetti, the main protagonist from 2002 video game Grand Theft Auto: Vice City
- Tommy Walker (Brothers & Sisters), on the TV series Brothers & Sisters
- Tommy Westphall, on the TV series St. Elsewhere
- Tommy (comics), former member of the Morlocks in the Marvel Comics universe
- Tommy, in the film The Karate Kid and the TV series Cobra Kai

== See also ==
- Tommy Atkins, nickname for a British soldier
- Thommy
- Tommi, Finnish given name
- Tommie, given name
- Tommy Robinson (disambiguation)
