= Leduc =

Leduc may refer to:

== People ==
- Albert Leduc (1902–1990), Canadian ice hockey player
- Alexandre Leduc (born 1984), Canadian politician
- Amand Leduc (1764–1832), French Navy officer
- Amanda Leduc, Canadian writer
- Audrey Leduc (born 1999), Canadian sprinter
- Jos LeDuc (1944–1999), Canadian professional wrestler
- Kyle LeDuc (1981–2023), American racing driver
- Michèle Leduc (born 1942), French physicist
- Noella Leduc (1933–2014), All-American Girls Professional Baseball League player
- Ozias Leduc (1864–1955), Canadian painter
- Renato Leduc (1897–1986), Mexican poet and journalist
- René Leduc (1898–1968), the designer of the world's first ramjet-powered aircraft
- Richard Leduc (born 1941), French actor
- Simon Le Duc or Leduc (1742–1777), French violinist and composer
- Stéphane Leduc (1853–1939), French biologist
- Timothy LeDuc (born 1990), American pairskater
- Tom LeDuc (1957–1989), American actor and model
- Violette Leduc (1907–1972), French author
- Dave Leduc (born 1991), Canadian professional fighter
- William Gates LeDuc (1823–1917), American soldier, farmer and lawyer

== Places ==
- Leduc, Alberta, a city in Alberta, Canada
- Leduc County, a municipal district in Alberta, Canada
- Leduc, Missouri, a ghost town in the United States

== Other ==
- Éditions Alphonse Leduc, a French music publisher
- Leduc experimental aircraft
- Leduc No. 1, the oil well strike that started Alberta's main oil boom, near Devon, Alberta
- Leduc Formation, a stratigraphical unit in the Western Canadian Sedimentary Basin
- William G. LeDuc House, historic house in Hastings, Minnesota
