= Thomas Kennedy =

Thomas or Tom Kennedy may refer to:

== Politics ==
- Thomas Kennedy of Bargany (died 1597), Scottish courtier and landowner
- Thomas Kennedy of Culzean (died 1602), Scottish landowner involved in a feud and a murder victim
- Thomas Kennedy (Scottish judge) (1673–1754), joint Solicitor General for Scotland 1709–14, Lord Advocate 1714, member of parliament for Ayr Burghs 1720–21
- Thomas Kennedy, 9th Earl of Cassilis (bef. 1733–1775), Scottish peer, Marquess of Ailsa
- Thomas Kennedy (Maryland politician) (1776-1832), American politician from Maryland
- Thomas Francis Kennedy (politician) (1788–1879), Scottish member of parliament for Ayr Burghs 1818–1834
- Thomas Daniel Kennedy (1849?–1877), Connecticut state legislator
- Thomas Kennedy (Australian politician) (1860–1929), Australian politician
- Tom Kennedy (British politician) (1874–1954), Scottish Member of Parliament for Kirkcaldy Burghs
- Thomas Blake Kennedy (1874–1957), United States federal judge
- Thomas Laird Kennedy (1878–1959), politician in Ontario, Canada
- Thomas Kennedy (Irish politician) (1887-1947), Irish Labour Party politician and trade union official
- Thomas Kennedy (unionist) (1887–1963), American miner, president of the UMWA 1960–1963, lieutenant governor of Pennsylvania 1935–1939
- Thomas C. Kennedy (1914–2006), American politician from Nebraska
- Thomas P. Kennedy (1951–2015), American politician, Massachusetts state senator

== Entertainment ==
- Tom Kennedy (actor) (1885–1965), American actor
- Tom Kennedy (television host) (1927–2020), American television game show host
- Thomas E. Kennedy (1944–2021), American fiction writer, essayist and translator
- Tom Kennedy (producer) (c. 1948–2011), American film trailer producer, director and film editor
- Tom Kennedy (musician) (born 1960), jazz double-bass and electric bass player
- Thomas Kennedy (Game Developer) (born 2000<), British software and game developer

== Sports ==
- Thomas J. Kennedy (1884–1937), American Olympic marathon runner
- Tommy Kennedy, Australian professional rugby league footballer in the 1920s
- Tom Kennedy (Australian footballer) (1906–1968), Australian rules footballer
- Tom Kennedy (quarterback) (1939–2006), American football quarterback
- Tom Kennedy (wheelchair rugby) (born 1957), Australian Paralympic wheelchair rugby player
- Tom Kennedy (English footballer) (born 1985), English footballer
- Thomas Kennedy (basketball) (born 1987), American basketball player
- Tom Kennedy (wide receiver) (born 1996), American football wide receiver

== Others ==
- Thomas Fortescue Kennedy (1774–1846), Royal Navy officer
- Thomas Kennedy (violin maker) (1784–1870), British luthier
- Thomas Francis Kennedy (bishop) (1858–1917), bishop of the Catholic Church in the United States
- Thomas Kennedy (RAF officer) (1928–2013), British pilot
- Tom Kennedy (journalist) (born 1952), Canadian television journalist
- Thomas A. Kennedy (born 1955), American CEO and chairman, Raytheon Company

== Fictional characters ==
- Tom Kennedy (Neighbours), a character on the Australian soap opera Neighbours, played by Bob Hornery
- Tommy Kennedy, a minor character introduced as a kind of host/narrator for 1988 reruns of The Transformers

== See also ==
- Thomas L. Kennedy Secondary School (established 1953), high school in Mississauga, Ontario, Canada
