= Thomas Browne (disambiguation) =

Thomas Browne (1605–1682) was an English polymath and author.

Thomas Browne may also refer to:

== Politics and law ==
- Thomas Browne (died 1460) (1402–1460), English MP and treasurer to Henry VI
- Thomas Browne (died 1597), English Member of Parliament (MP)
- Thomas Browne, 4th Viscount Kenmare (1726–1795), Irish landowner and politician
- Thomas C. Browne (1794–1858), American jurist and politician from Illinois
- Thomas Gore Browne (1807–1887), British colonial administrator; Governor of St Helena, New Zealand, Tasmania, and Bermuda
- Thomas M. Browne (1829–1891), U.S. Representative from Indiana
- Thomas Frederic De Courcy Browne (1838–1899), New South Wales politician
- Thomas H. B. Browne (1844–1892), U.S. Representative from Virginia

== Religion ==
- Thomas Browne (Canon of Windsor) (c. 1605–1673), English Anglican priest
- Thomas Browne (Master of Christ's College, Cambridge) (1766–1832), English priest and academic
- Thomas Browne (Archdeacon of Ipswich) (1889–1978), British Anglican priest

== Others ==
- Thomas Browne (Master of Pembroke College, Cambridge) (1648–1706), English academic
- Thomas Browne II (1648–1715), early settler of Maryland
- Thomas Browne (physician, 1672–1710), English physician
- Thomas Browne (officer of arms) (1708–1780), English officer of arms
- Thomas Alexander Browne (1826–1915) "Rolf Boldrewood", Australian writer

== See also ==
- Thomas Brown (disambiguation)
- Tom Brown (disambiguation)
- Tom Browne (disambiguation)
- Tommy Brown (disambiguation)
