= Thomas Brown =

Thomas Brown may refer to:

== Arts and literature ==
- Thomas Brown (satirist) (1662–1704), English satirist
- Thomas Brown (philosopher) (1778–1820), Scottish poet and philosopher
- Thomas Brown, pen name of Thomas Moore (1779–1852)
- Thomas Brown (architect) (1781–1850), Scottish architect
- Thomas Brown (prison architect) (1806–1872), Scottish architect
- Thomas Edward Brown (1830–1897), Manx poet, scholar, and divine
- T. Allston Brown (Thomas Allston Brown, 1836–1918), American theater critic and historian
- Thomas Wilson Brown (born 1972), American actor

== Business and industry ==
- Thomas Brown (businessman) (1738–1797), American husbandman, businessman, and land speculator
- Thomas Brown (engineer) (1772–1850), English surveyor, engineer, businessman, and landowner
- Thomas Forster Brown (1835–1907), English civil and mining engineer

== Politics and law ==
=== Australia ===
- Thomas Brown (settler) (1803–1863), Australian pastoralist and politician
- Thomas Brown (New South Wales colonial politician) (1811–1889), New South Wales politician
- Thomas Brown (New South Wales politician) (1861–1934), Australian farmer and politician
- Thomas Leishman Brown (1862–1946), Australian politician and trade unionist

=== United States ===
- Thomas Brown (Florida politician) (1785–1867), American politician, second Governor of Florida
- Thomas Jefferson Brown (1836–1915), Chief Justice of the Supreme Court of Texas
- Thomas H. Brown (mayor) (1839–1908), American politician, mayor of Milwaukee, Wisconsin
- Thomas C. Brown (1870–1952), New York state senator
- Thomas H. Brown (Michigan politician) (1917–2002), American politician

=== Other countries ===
- Thomas Watters Brown (1879–1944), Northern Irish politician
- Thomas James Brown (1886–1970), British coal miner and Labour Party politician

== Religion ==
- Thomas Brunce (a.k.a. "Thomas Brown", c. 1388–1445) English bishop of Rochester & of Norwich
- Thomas Brown (martyr) (1530–1556), English protestant martyred during the Marian persecutions
- Thomas Brown (minister of St John's, Glasgow) (1776–1847), moderator of the General Assembly of the Free Church of Scotland
- Joseph Brown (bishop) (Thomas Joseph Brown, 1796–1880), English bishop of the Roman Catholic Church
- Thomas Brown (minister and natural historian) (1811–1893), moderator of the General Assembly of the Free Church of Scotland, author of Annals
- Tom Brown (bishop of Wellington) (born 1943), Anglican bishop in New Zealand
- Thomas J. Brown (bishop of Maine) (born 1970), American bishop of the Episcopal Diocese of Maine

== Science and medicine ==
- Thomas Broun (1838–1919), Scottish soldier and entomologist, born "Brown"
- Thomas Brown of Lanfine and Waterhaughs (1774–1853), Scottish surgeon, botanist, and mineralogist
- Thomas Brown (naturalist) (1785–1862), English naturalist
- Thomas Graham Brown (1882–1965), Scottish physiologist and mountaineer
- Thomas Townsend Brown (1905–1985), American scientific researcher and inventor
- Thomas McPherson Brown (1906–1989), American rheumatologist
- Thomas Edwin Burton Brown, British surgeon

== Sports ==
=== Cricket ===
- Thomas Brown (cricketer, born 1845) (1845–?), English cricketer
- Thomas Brown (cricketer, born 1848) (1848–1919), English cricketer
- Thomas Brown (cricketer, born 1854) (1854–1936), English cricketer
- Thomas Brown (cricketer, born 1863) (1863–1930), English cricketer

=== Other sports ===
- Thomas Brown (sport shooter) (1885–1950), American Olympic sport shooter
- Thomas Brown (footballer) (fl. 1907–1910), English footballer
- T. J. Brown (baseball) (Thomas Julius Brown, 1915–1973), American Negro league baseball player
- Thomas P. Brown, Jr. (1921–2011), American tennis player
- Thomas Brown (defensive end) (born 1957), American football defensive end
- Tom Brown (rugby, born 1983), English rugby union and rugby league player
- Tom Brown (rugby union, born 1990), Scottish rugby union player
- Thomas Gow Brown, Scottish rugby union player
- Thomas Brown (American football coach) (born 1986), American football running back

== Others ==
- Thomas Brown (loyalist) (1750–1825), American Revolution commander of King's Rangers in Georgia
- Thomas Storrow Brown (1803–1888), Canadian journalist, orator, and revolutionary
- Thomas L. Brown II (1960–2021), United States Navy officer

== See also ==
- Tom Brown (disambiguation)
- Tommy Brown (disambiguation)
- Thomas Browne (disambiguation)
