= Bartuska =

Bartuska or Bartuška is a surname. Notable people with the surname include:

- Ann Bartuska (born 1953), American ecologist and biologist
- Franz Daniel Bartuska (in office 1731–1732), mayor of Vienna
- Tom J. Bartuska, American architect, educator, and author
- Vincas Bartuška (1901–1988), Lithuanian footballer
