= Leduc 022 =

French prototype aircraft

022
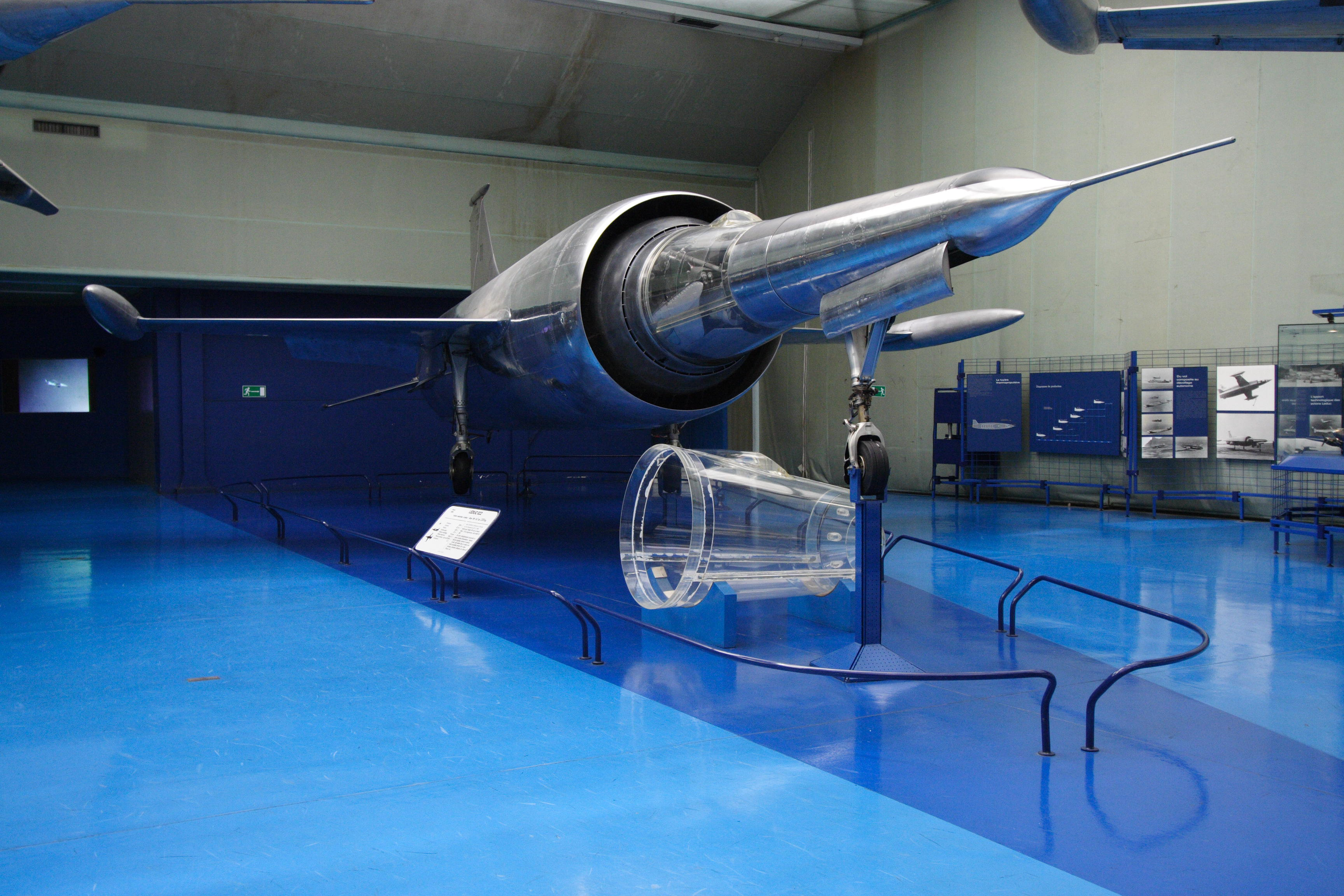
- Leduc 022 preserved in the Musée de l'air et de l'espace at Le Bourget

General information
- Type: Research aircraft
- National origin: France
- Manufacturer: Breguet
- Designer: René Leduc
- Number built: 2

History
- First flight: 26 December 1956

The Leduc 022 was the prototype of a mixed-power French interceptor built in the mid-1950s. Designer René Leduc had been developing ramjet-powered aircraft since before World War II and had flown a series of experimental aircraft, the Leduc 0.10 and Leduc 0.21, throughout the 1950s before he was awarded a contract for two examples of a short-range supersonic interceptor armed with two air-to-air missiles (AAMs).

Intended for combat use, the 022 was able to take off from a runway as it was fitted with a supplementary turbojet engine, unlike his earlier aircraft which required a mother aircraft to carry them to altitude because ramjets cannot produce thrust while stationary. Development was cancelled by the French Air Force (Armée de l'Air) in 1958 due to budgetary problems while flight testing was underway and before the second prototype was completed.

== Background and description ==
In 1953 the French Air Force issued a specification for a high-performance interceptor that could intercept and destroy any aerial threat after taking off from a 940-metre (3,080 ft) grass runway. It ordered two prototype 022S aircraft in competition with the Nord Gerfaut and Griffon. Leduc used a more powerful version of the ramjet that he had been developing since 1938 and added a turbojet to allow for more autonomous operations. Air for the ramjet was provided by six air ducts surrounding the nose section that emptied into the hollow interior of the double-walled fuselage where fuel was injected and ignited by the exhaust of a Turbomeca Artouste gas turbine. The ramjet was expected to produce a thrust of 160 kilonewtons (36,000 lb_{f}) and a time to 25,000 metres (82,000 ft) of only seven minutes, a climbing speed much faster than jet-powered aircraft.

The 022S was generally similar in configuration aside from the 30° swept wings and tricycle landing gear. It retained the thick barrel-like monocoque fuselage and the protruding nose section housing the transparent Plexiglass cockpit, but added a range-only radar. The forward part of the nose formed an escape capsule for the pilot. The aircraft was provided with approximately 2,728-litre (600 imp gal; 721 US gal) of fuel distributed between the fuselage, wings and wingtip tanks. Its intended armament consisted of a pair of Nord AA.20 guided missiles and 24 anti-aircraft rockets. Unlike all previous Leduc aircraft, it featured a coaxial turbojet-ramjet powerplant to enable unassisted operation. The turbojet was initially a 15 kN (3,400 lb_{f}) Turbomeca Ossau engine, but this was changed during construction to a much more powerful 31.3 kN (7,000 lb_{f}) SNECMA Atar 101D-3.

This change caused the aircraft to be redesignated as the 022 and allowed the number of rockets to be increased to 40. First flown on 26 December 1956 on turbojet power alone, the ramjet was finally fired on the 34th flight, on 18 May 1957. It reached a speed of Mach 1.15 on 21 December 1957, but was damaged shortly afterwards when it caught fire while taking off. Construction of a second prototype had been cancelled in October and the flight testing contract was cancelled on 13 February 1958 after 141 flights had been made. The ongoing Algerian War was consuming more of the military budget and the more conventional Dassault Mirage III was selected to meet the interceptor requirement. The cancellation marked the end of Leduc's aircraft development activities.

== Surviving aircraft ==
The unflown second prototype 022 is on display at the Musée de l'air et de l'espace at Paris–Le Bourget Airport. It was donated by the Leduc family in 1979.

== Specifications ==
Data from X-Planes of Europe II: Military Prototype Aircraft from the Golden Age 1946–1974

General characteristics

- Crew: 1
- Length: 18.21 m (59 ft 9 in)
- Wingspan: 9.95 m (32 ft 8 in)
- Wing area: 21.1 m^{2} (227 sq ft)
- Max takeoff weight: 8,975 kg (19,786 lb)
- Fuel capacity: 2,728 L (600 imp gal; 721 US gal)
- Powerplant: 1 × Leduc ramjet , 63.6 kN (14,300 lbf) thrust @ 1,000 km/h (620 mph) at sea level
- Powerplant: 1 × SNECMA Atar 101D-3 turbojet , 31.3 kN (7,000 lbf) thrust

Performance

- Maximum speed: 1,200 km/h (750 mph, 650 kn) this speed was met in tests, which were cut short due to loss of first prototype
- Maximum speed: Mach 1.15
- Service ceiling: 8,800 m (28,900 ft) (achieved)

== Bibliography ==
- Buttler, Tony (2015). X-Planes of Europe. Vol. II: Military Prototype Aircraft from the Golden Age 1946–1974. Manchester, UK: Hikoki Publications. ISBN 978-1-90210-948-0.
- Carbonel, Jean-Christophe (2016). French Secret Projects. Vol. 1: Post War Fighters. Manchester, UK: Crecy Publishing. ISBN 978-1-91080-900-6.
