= Tom (surname) =

Tom is a surname, and may refer to:

- Abongile Tom (born 1991), South African football referee
- Albert Tom, American politician from Arizona
- Ateke Tom (born 1964), traditional ruler
- Bill Tom (1923–2012), American gymnast
- Brother Tom (born 1956), Japanese singer and tarento
- Cameron Tom (born 1995), American football player
- Commander Tom (1962–2022), German DJ and record producer
- Geua Tom (born 1995), Papua New Guinean cricketer
- Harry W. K. Tom, American physicist
- James Tom (born 1990/1991), American comedian, actor and writer
- Jean Marion Tom (1922–2017), Australian community worker
- Jess Tom (born 1984), American television personality and food writer
- Joel Tom (born 1989), Papua New Guinean cricketer
- John Files Tom (1818–1906), American soldier, sheriff and legislator
- Ka'ai Tom (born 1994), American baseball player
- Kiana Tom, American television host
- Kip E. Tom, American agribusiness executive and diplomat
- Konrad Tom (1887–1957), Polish Jewish actor, writer, singer and director
- Kunda Tom (born 1986), Cook Islander footballer
- Lauren Tom (born 1961), American actress
- Layne Tom Jr. (1927–2015), American actor
- Lino Tom (born 1975), Papua New Guinean politician and medical doctor
- Logan Tom (born 1981), American volleyball player
- Maeley Tom, American politician
- Mairi Tom, Papua New Guinean cricketer
- Michael Tom (1946–1999), American sculptor
- Mel Tom (1941–2006), American football player
- Mthuthuzeli Tom (1959–2010), South African trade union leader
- Mvuyo Tom, South African doctor, administrator and academic
- Mzuvukile Tom (born 1982), South African football player
- Nicholle Tom (born 1978), American actress
- Noah Nirmal Tom (born 1994), Indian athlete and Indian Air Force officer
- Pamela Tom, American producer, director and screenwriter
- Paul Tom, Canadian documentary filmmaker
- Peter Tom (businessman) (born 1940), British businessman
- Peter Tom (judge), American attorney and judge
- Peter Tom (politician) (1964–2018), Solomon Islands politician
- Ping Tom (1935–1995), American businessman and civic leader
- Richard Tom (1920–2007), Chinese American weightlifter
- Rodney Tom (born 1963), American businessman and politician
- Sleepy Tom, Canadian DJ and music producer
- Steve Tom (born 1953), American actor
- Steven Tom (born 1951), English footballer
- Terrance W. H. Tom, American politician
- Tini Tom, Indian actor and comedian
- Tío Tom (1919–1991), Afro-Cuban musician
- Xoliswa Tom, South African politician
- Zachary Miskom Tom, birth name of Zach Bako-Bewele (born 1999), American football player

== See also ==
- Tom (given name)
