= Tom Brown =

Tom Brown may refer to:

== Arts and entertainment ==
- Tom Brown (satirist) (1662–1704), English satirical writer
- Tom Brown (trombonist) (1888–1958), American jazz trombonist and bandleader
- Tom Brown (actor) (1913–1990), American film and television actor
- Tom E. Brown (born 1967), American director, screenwriter, producer, and actor
- Tom Brown (chef) (born 1987), British chef
- Tom Brown (character), fictional character introduced in Tom Brown's Schooldays

== Sports ==
=== Association football ===
- Tom Brown (footballer, born 1919) (1919–2000), Scottish footballer
- Tom Brown (footballer, born 1968), Scottish former footballer

=== Baseball ===
- Tom Brown (outfielder) (1860–1927), American baseball player and manager
- Tom Brown (safety) (1940–2025), American baseball outfielder and first baseman, football player
- Tom Brown (pitcher) (born 1949), American baseball pitcher

=== Gridiron football ===
- Tom Brown (tackle) (1890–1972), American football player
- Tom Brown (end) (1921–2013), American football player in the NFL
- Tom Brown (guard) (1936–2026), American football player in the CFL
- Tom Brown (safety) (1940–2025), American football safety in the NFL and baseball player
- Tom Brown (wide receiver) (born 1963), American football player in the NFL
- Tom Brown (running back) (born 1964), American football player in the NFL

=== Rugby ===
- Tom Brown (rugby union, born 1907) (1907–1961), English rugby union player
- Tom Brown (rugby, born 1983), English rugby union and rugby league player
- Tom Brown (rugby union, born 1990), Scottish rugby union player

=== Other sports ===
- Tom Brown (bowls) (1915–1980), England lawn bowls competitor
- Tom Brown (tennis) (1922–2011), American tennis player
- Tom Brown (Australian footballer) (born 2003), Australian rules football player

== Others ==
- Tom Brown (British Army soldier) (1705–1746), hero of the Battle of Dettingen
- Thomas Mott Osborne (alias "Tom Brown", 1859–1926), American prison warden
- Tom Brown (British politician) (1886–1970), British Labour MP
- Tom Brown (police officer) (1889–1959), American police chief of St. Paul, Minnesota
- Tom Brown (anarchist) (1900–1974), British anarcho-syndicalist
- Tom Brown (engineer) (1933–2019), Scottish engineer
- Tom Brown (Florida politician) (1933–2024), American politician in the state of Florida
- Tom Brown (bishop) (born 1943), New Zealand Anglican bishop
- Tom Brown Jr. (1950–2024), American naturalist, tracker, survivalist, and author
- Tom Brown (chemist) (born 1952), British chemistry professor
- Tom Brown (apple hunter) (active since 1999), North Carolina-based orchardist and apple hunter
- Tom Brown, a Ghanaian breakfast porridge made from roasted maize

== See also ==
- Thomas Brown (disambiguation)
- Tommy Brown (disambiguation)
- Thomas Browne (disambiguation)
- Tom Browne (disambiguation)
- Tom Browning (born 1960), American baseball player
