= Thomas Ray =

Thomas or Tom Ray may refer to:

- Thomas S. Ray (born 1954), American ecologist
- Thomas Ray (cricketer) (1770–?), English cricketer
- Tom Ray (1919–2010), American animator
- Tom V. Ray (born 1965), American bassist
- Thomas K. Ray, Episcopal bishop in the US, Bishop of Northern Michigan
- Thomas Matthew Ray (1801–1881), Irish nationalist, politician, activist and author

== See also ==
- Ray Thomas (disambiguation)
- Tom Re (1913–1996), Australian rules footballer
- Thomas Wray (1827–1877), Australian cricketer
