= Ledu =

Ledu may refer to:

- Ledu District, Haidong, Qinghai, China
- Ledu (prince) (1636–1655), Prince Min of the Second Rank of the Qing dynasty

== See also ==
- Leduc (disambiguation)
