= Thommy =

Thommy is a given name and a surname. Notable people with the name include:

- Erik Thommy (born 1994), German professional footballer
- Thommy Abrahamsson (born 1947), German chemist
- Thommy Berggren (born 1937), Swedish actor
- Thommy Kane (born 1965), American rock musician and filmmaker
- Thommy Luke Boehlig (born 1994), German martial artist and actor
- Thommy Price (born 1956), American musician

== See also ==
- Tommy
