= Tommi =

Tommi is a masculine Finnish given name. Traditional Finnish diminutive of “Thomas”. Thomas comes from the Aramaic name Thoma, meaning ‘twin’. Used as a formal given name since 20th century, reinforced by the English Tommy.

Notable people with the name include:

- Tommi Eronen (born 1968), Finnish actor
- Tommi Evilä (born 1980), Finnish long jumper
- Tommi Grönlund (born 1969), Finnish footballer
- Tommi Hakala (born 1970, Finnish baritone, winner of the 2003 BBC Singer of the World Competition
- Tommi Hartonen (born 1977), Finnish sprinter
- Tommi Hill (born 2002), American football player
- Tommi Hovi (born 1980), former professional Magic: The Gathering player from Finland
- Tommi Jyry (born 1999), Finnish footballer
- Tommi Jäntti (born 2000), Finnish footballer
- Tommi Kautonen (born 1971), Finnish football manager and former player (midfielder)
- Tommi Korpela (born 1968), Finnish actor
- Tommi Liimatta (born 1976), singer, songwriter and lyricist for the rock group Absoluuttinen Nollapiste
- Tommi Läntinen (born 1959), Finnish singer-songwriter
- Tommi Mäkinen (born 1964), retired Finnish rally driver
- Tommi Miettinen (born 1975), retired Finnish professional ice hockey player
- Tommi Paavola (born 1965), Finnish footballer and coach
- Tommi Salmelainen (born 1949), Finnish hockey left winger
- Tommi Santala (born 1979), Finnish ice hockey player
- Tommi Sartanen, Finnish guitarist, who plays in the power metal band Twilightning
- Tommi Satosaari (born 1975), Finnish professional ice hockey goaltender
- Tommi Stumpff (1958–2023), former German musician
- Tommi Taurula, Finnish actor
- Tommi Tomich (born 1980), Australian football (soccer) player
- Tommi Vaiho (born 1988), Swedish-Finnish goalkeeper
- Tommi Viik (born 1987), Finnish professional football player
- Tommi Virtanen (born 1989), Finnish ice hockey goaltender

== See also ==
- Tommi (band), British girl group formed in 2003
- Tommi puukko, maybe the most famous traditional knife from Finland called Puukko
