= Thomas Dale (disambiguation) =

Sir Thomas Dale (died 1619) was a British naval commander and deputy governor of the Virginia Colony.

Thomas Dale may also refer to:

- Thomas Dale (physician) (1729–1816), British-American physician
- Thomas H. Dale (1846–1912), U.S. congressman from Pennsylvania
- Thomas Dale High School, named for the naval commander
- Thomas Dale (priest) (1797–1870), Anglican Dean of Rochester, poet and theologian
- T. Lawrence Dale (1884–1959), English architect
- Thomas Pelham Dale (1821–1892), English Anglo-Catholic ritualist priest
- Thomas Francis Dale (1848–1923), English army chaplain and author on fox hunting and polo

== See also ==
- Thomas Daley (disambiguation)
