= Thomas Hayes =

Thomas Hayes may refer to:

== Law and politics ==
- Thomas W. Hayes, California State Treasurer
- Thomas Hayes (Texas politician) in 14th and twenty-first Texas Legislature
- Thomas Hayes (Australian politician) (1890–1967), member in the Victorian Legislative Assembly
- Thomas L. Hayes (1926/7–1987), Vermont Supreme Court Justice
- Thomas Hayes (Lord Mayor) (died 1617), English merchant and Lord Mayor of London
- Thomas Gordon Hayes (1844–1915), politician and lawyer in Maryland

== Sportspeople ==
- Thomas Hayes (boxer) (1981–2025), American heavyweight boxer
- Tommy Hayes (rugby union, born 1973), Cook Island rugby union player
- Tommy Hayes (rugby union, born 1980), Irish rugby union player
- Thomas P. Hayes, thoroughbred racehorse trainer who won the Kentucky Derby and the Preakness Stakes

== Sailors ==
- Thomas Hayes (Medal of Honor) (1840–1914), American Civil War sailor and Medal of Honor recipient
- John Brown (sailor) (Thomas Hayes, 1826–1883), American Civil War sailor and Medal of Honor recipient

== Others ==
- Thomas Hayes (San Francisco landowner) (1820–1868), land owner in San Francisco
- Thomas Hayes (bishop) (1847–1904), Anglican bishop
- Thomas Highs (1718–1803), sometimes Hayes, reed-maker and manufacturer of cotton carding and spinning engines
- Thomas Hayes (trader), former UBS trader, convicted in connection with the Libor scandal
- Thomas J. Hayes III (1914–2004), United States Army general
- Thomas Hayes (actor) (born 1997), Norwegian actor
- Thomas L. Hayes Jr., United States Army Air Forces flying ace

== See also ==
- Tom Hayes (disambiguation)
- Tommy Hays (1929–2023), guitarist and vocalist
- Thomas Hay (disambiguation)
- Thomas Heyes, publisher-bookseller
