= Thomas Daley =

Thomas or Tom Daley may refer to:

- Tom Daley (born 1994), English diver
- Tom Daley (baseball) (1884–1934), American baseball player
- Tom Daley (footballer) (1933–2020), English footballer
- Joe Daley (ice hockey) (Thomas Joseph Daley, born 1943), Canadian ice hockey goaltender

== See also ==
- Thomas Dale (disambiguation)
- Thomas Daly (disambiguation)
- Tom Daly (disambiguation)
- Thomas Vose Daily (1927–2017), Catholic bishop
