= Thomas Daly =

Thomas Daly may refer to:

== Politicians ==
- Thomas Mayne Daly (1852–1911), member of the Canadian House of Commons and cabinet minister from Manitoba
- Thomas Mayne Daly Sr. (1827–1885), his father, member of the Canadian House of Commons from Ontario
- Thomas Daly (Irish politician), member of the Northern Ireland Assembly
- Thomas Daly (Alberta politician) (1861–1908), municipal councillor in Edmonton, Alberta

== Others ==
- Thomas Anthony Daly (born 1960), Bishop of Spokane
- Thomas Aquinas Daly (born 1937), American contemporary landscape and still life painter
- Thomas Daly (cricketer) (1847–1887), Australian cricketer
- Thomas Daly (general) (1913–2004), Australian soldier, Chief of the General Staff, 1966–1971
- T. F. Gilroy Daly (Thomas Francis Gilroy Daly, 1931–1996), United States district judge

== See also ==
- Tom Daly (disambiguation)
- Tom Daley (disambiguation)
- Thomas Vose Daily (1927–2017), Catholic bishop
