= Tom Browne =

Tom Browne may refer to:

- Tom Browne (whistler) (1865–1907)
- Tom Browne (illustrator) (1870–1910)
- Tom Browne (broadcaster) (born 1945)
- Tom Browne (trumpeter) (born 1954)
- Tom Fisher (actor) (born 1968)

== See also ==
- Tom Brown (disambiguation)
- Thomas Browne (disambiguation)
