= Thomas Hay =

Thomas Hay may refer to:

- Thomas Hay (bishop), 15th-century Scottish prelate
- Thomas de la Hay (c. 1342–1406), Scottish baron and soldier
- Thomas Hay, 9th Earl of Kinnoull (1710–1787), Scottish MP
- Thomas Hay (Canadian politician) (1872–1939), Canadian politician
- Thomas William Hay, British Member of Parliament for South Norfolk, 1922–1923
- Thomas Hay (Lewes MP) (1733–1796), British Army officer and politician
- Thomas Hay, 7th Earl of Kinnoull (1660–1719), Scottish peer and Conservative politician
- Thomas Hay, Lord Huntingdon (1707–1755), Scottish lawyer and judge

== See also ==
- Thomas Hay-Drummond, 11th Earl of Kinnoull (1785–1866), Scottish peer
- Thomas Hayes (disambiguation)
