= Thomas Sloane =

Thomas Sloane may refer to:

- Thomas Gibson Sloane (1858–1932), Australian sheep grazier and entomologist
- T. O'Conor Sloane (1851–1940), American scientist, inventor, author, and linguist
- T. O'Conor Sloane Jr. (1879–1963), American photographer
- T. O'Conor Sloane III (1912–2003), American editor, professor, etymologist and military officer

== See also ==
- Thomas Sloan (disambiguation)
