= Edward Browne (physician) =

British physician

- Born: 1644; Norwich, England
- Died: 28 August 1708 (aged 63–64); Northfleet, Kent, England
- Education: Trinity College, Cambridge
- Occupation: Physician
- Medical career
- Field: Medicine, travel writing
- Institutions: St. Bartholomew's Hospital

Edward Browne, FRS (1644 – 28 August 1708) was an English physician, and president of the College of Physicians.

== Life ==
He was the eldest son of Sir Thomas Browne and was born in Norwich in 1644. Educated at Norwich School and at Trinity College, Cambridge. he graduated M.B. at Cambridge in 1663, and then returned to Norwich.

A journal of his early life survives, which gives an amusing picture of his activities, and of life in Norwich. It records that he often went to dances at the Duke's palace, admired the gems preserved there, and learnt to play ombre from the Duke's brother. He dissected nearly every day, studied botany, read medicine and literature and theology in his father's library, and saw at least one patient. "16 Feb. Mrs. Anne Ward gave me my first fee, ten shillings."

A week after this significant event, Browne went to London. He attended the lectures of Dr. Christopher Terne, physician to St. Bartholomew's Hospital, and married Terne's daughter Henrietta in 1672. His notes of Dr. Teme's lectures exist in manuscript in the British Museum. When the lectures were ended, Browne returned to Norwich, and soon after started on his travels.

Brief account of some travels in Hungaria, Servia, Bulgaria, Macedonia, Thessaly, Austria, Styria, Carinthia, and Friuli (1696)

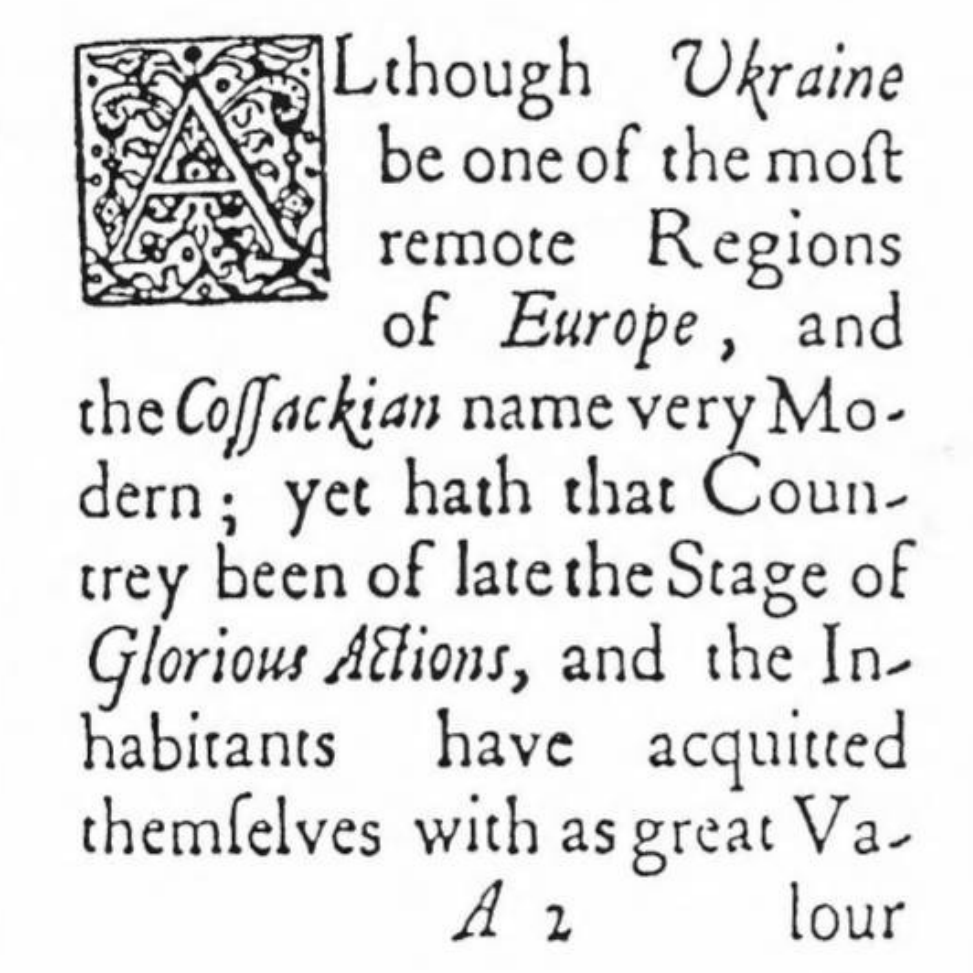
A Discourse of the Cossacks (1672), translated from French by Edward Browne, contains the first-known occurrence of the word "Ukrainians" in the English language.

He travelled to Italy and came home through France, and it is by his description of this and of several subsequent journeys that he is best known. In 1668, he sailed to Rotterdam from Yarmouth and went to Leyden, Amsterdam, and Utrecht, visiting museums, libraries, and churches, attending lectures, and conversing with the learned. He went on to Antwerp, and ended his journey at Cologne on 10 October 1668. His next journey was to Vienna, where he made friends with the imperial librarian Lambecius, and enjoyed many excursions and much learned conversation. He seems to have studied Greek colloquially, and brought back letters from a learned Greek in his own tongue to Dr. Pearson, the bishop of Chester, and to Dr. Isaac Barrow, the master of Trinity.

From Vienna Browne made three long journeys, one to the mines of Hungary, one into Thessaly, and one into Styria and Carinthia. Wherever he went he observed all objects natural and historical, as well as everything bearing on his profession. He sketched in a stiff manner, and some of his drawings are preserved in the British Museum. At Buda he came into contact with the oriental world, and at Larissa he saw the Grand Seigneur, studied Greek remains, and followed in imagination the practice of Hippocrates.

He returned to England in 1669 and made one more tour in 1673 in the company of Sir Joseph Williamson, Sir Leoline Jenkins, and Charles Mordaunt, 3rd Earl of Peterborough. He visited Cologne, Aix-la-Chapelle, Liege, Louvain, Ghent, Bruges, and other towns of the Low Countries.

He published in London in 1673 a small quarto volume called A Brief Account of some Travels in Hungaria, Styria, Bulgaria, Macedonia, Thessaly, Austria, Serbia, Carynthia, Carniola, and Friuli; Another volume appeared in 1677. In 1685 a collection of all his travels in one volume folio. It contains some small alterations and some additions. In 1672 he published in 12mo a translation of a 'History' of the Cossacks,' and wrote the lives of Themistocles and Sertorius in Dryden's 'Plutarch,' published in 1700.

In 1667, Browne was elected F.R.S., and in 1675 he was admitted a fellow of the College of Physicians. He lived in Salisbury Court, Fleet Street, and became physician to the King Charles II. Elected physician to St. Bartholomew's Hospital 7 September 1682, he was treasurer of the College of Physicians 1694–1704, and president from 1704 to 1708.

== Assessment ==
He had a large practice, and enjoyed the friendship of many men in power. A Grub Street writer attributes part of his good fortune to the favour of one of Charles II's mistresses; but the statement has no foundation in fact. Browne's professional success was due to his general capacity and interesting conversation. His note-books show that he laboured hard at his profession, and that through good introductions he early became known to many physicians, surgeons, and apothecaries.

In 1673, he had already met in consultation thirteen physicians and ten surgeons. A great many letters and notes in his handwriting are to be found among the Sloane MSS. Amongst them is the earliest known copy of the 'Pharmacopœia' of St. Bartholomew's Hospital. It is edited 1670, and some of its prescriptions were the subject of correspondence between Browne and his father.

Browne died at Northfleet, Kent, on 28 August 1708, leaving a son, Thomas Browne, and a daughter. He is buried at Northfleet.
