= Tom Hayes =

Tom Hayes may refer to:

== Business ==
- Tom Hayes (author) (born 1960), business writer, Silicon Valley businessman
- Tom Hayes (trader), former UBS trader, the first person to be convicted in relation to the Libor Scandal

== Politics ==
- Tom Hayes (Australian politician) (1890–1967), member of the Victorian Legislative Assembly
- Tom Hayes (civil servant), former director of the Ohio Department of Job and Family Services
- Tom Hayes (Irish politician) (born 1952), Irish Fine Gael Party politician, TD and senator
- Tom Hayes (public servant), former Comptroller-General of the Australian Customs Service
- Tom Hayes (British politician), British Labour Party politician

== Sports ==
- Tom Hayes (cornerback) (born 1946), former American football cornerback
- Tom Hayes (American football coach) (born 1949), retired college and professional American football coach
- Tom Hayes (Australian footballer) (1921–2010), played with North Melbourne in the Victorian Football League
- Tom Hayes (soccer) (born 1963), retired American soccer forward

== See also ==
- Thomas Hayes (disambiguation)
