= Tommy Brown =

Tommy Brown may refer to:

== Arts and entertainment ==
- Tommy Brown (singer) (1931–2016), American R&B singer
- Tommy Brown (record producer) (born 1986), American record producer

== Sports ==
- Tommy Brown (footballer, born 1896) (1896–1973), Scottish footballer (Brighton, Cardiff, Bristol City, South Shields, Luton)
- Tommy Brown (footballer, born 1897), English footballer (Bradford Park Avenue)
- Tommy Brown (footballer, born 1906), English footballer (Fulham, York City)
- Tommy Brown (footballer, born 1921) (1921–1966), Scottish footballer (Hearts, Millwall, Charlton, Leyton Orient)
- Tommy Brown (baseball) (1927–2025), American baseball player

== Others ==
- Tommy Brown (NAAFI assistant) (1926–1945), English recipient of the George Medal for helping to break the German Enigma code

== See also ==
- Thomas Brown (disambiguation)
- Tom Brown (disambiguation)
- Tommie Brown (1934–2026), American politician from Tennessee
