= Tommy Asnip =

English footballer

Personal information
- Full name: Thomas Asnip
- Date of birth: 18 February 1883
- Place of birth: Sheffield, England
- Date of death: 24 July 1918 (aged 35)
- Place of death: West Flanders, Belgium
- Position: Outside left

Senior career*
Years	Team	Apps	(Gls)
- St Catherines (Lincoln)
1904	Lincoln City	1	(0)
- Adelaide Park
- * Club domestic league appearances and goals

Thomas Asnip (18 February 1883 – 24 July 1918) was an English amateur footballer who played in the Football League for Lincoln City as an outside forward.

== Personal life ==
Asnip served in the Royal Lincolnshire and North Staffordshire Regiments during the First World War and was serving as a lance sergeant when he was killed in West Flanders on 24 July 1918. He is buried in No. 10 Cemetery in Loker.

== Career statistics ==
Appearances and goals by club, season and competition
Club	Season	League			FA Cup		Total	
Club	Season	Division	Apps	Goals	Apps	Goals	Apps	Goals
Lincoln City	1904–05	Second Division	1	0	0	0	1	0
Career total			1	0	0	0	1	0
