= Thommy Luke Boehlig =

German martial artist

Personal information
- Nationality: German
- Born: 13 April 1976 (age 50)
- Occupations: Keynote speaker; author

Sport
- Sport: Martial arts

Thommy Luke Böhlig (anglicised as Boehlig; born 13 April 1976) is a German martial artist, Keynote Speaker, actor, and author. In 2005 he founded the umbrella organization "Wing Tsjun International," which now has over 80 schools in 15 countries worldwide. He lives with his family in Langenfeld (Rhineland).

== Life and career ==
At the age of six, Boehlig started judo, followed by shotokan-karate and Thai-kickboxing. After graduating high school Boehlig began an apprenticeship as a wholesale and foreign trade merchant, which he discontinued after two years.

In 1991 Boehlig started with Wing Chun. His teachers included Keith Ronald Kernspecht, Stefan Fischer, Emin Boztepe, Hans-Peter Edel, and Thomas Schroen.

In 1997, he completed training in executive protection at the IPSO Security Academy in Wiesenbach near Heidelberg. Boehlig worked as a bodyguard, i.e., for the Buddhist High Priest Zuiou Inuoe and Cardinal Felix Machado of the Vatican's Pontifical Council.

=== Instructor and teacher ===
In 2002 Boehlig was awarded the honorary title "Sifu of Wing Tsun" (Wing Chun) by Keith R. Kernspecht. In 2005 Boehlig passed the EWTO's exam for the 4th instructor level. In cooperation with Wing Chun Master Allan Fong, eskrima Master Emanuel Hart, and qigong instructor Thomas Resch, Boehlig founded the organization "Martial Arts International". A martial arts cross-functional umbrella organization for Wing Chun, eskrima, and qigong. In the same year, he was appointed Wing Chun Master by Allan Fong.

In 2006 Boehlig became the official instructor of the City of Langenfeld's (Rhineland) code enforcement office (Ordnungsamt), and one year later of the City of Hilden.

Boehlig succeeded Allan Fongs in 2007 and was thus appointed Dai Sifu (advanced teacher).

In 2009 Boehlig, following Chinese tradition, rose to the position of Grand Master of Wing Chun when his oldest student passed the master examination.

In 2010 the organization's name was changed from "Martial Arts International" to "Boehlig Defense Systems" (BDS) and "Wing Tsjun International" (the Wing Chun arm of BDS). The organization currently has more than 80 schools in 15 countries, including the US, Australia, Colombia, and Brazil. They teach Wing Chun for adults and teenagers, kung fu for children, fitness, de-escalation & intervention techniques for law enforcement and law enforcement agencies, and violence prevention.

Since 2014, Boehlig has been training the correctional facility staff in Iserlohn in de-escalation and security techniques. In 2017, Boehlig started cooperating with the German University for Prevention and Health for various bachelor and master programs. In 2020 Boehlig did partake in a scientific research project "Learning physics with kung fu" in cooperation with the University of Cologne. Students of the Faculty of Mathematics and Natural Sciences at the University of Cologne have been working since then with the jointly developed TACTILE REACTION TRAINING (TRT) program.

=== International ===
Boehlig has been working internationally in the field of Wing Chun since 1996. From 1996 to 2000, Boehlig led the EWTO schools (European Wing Tsun Organization) in Perth and Fremantle (Australia) under national coach Stefan Fischer. The organization is considered one of the largest Wing Chun organizations worldwide.

In 2002 Boehlig became, within the EWTO, the national coach for Wing Tsun in Scotland.

Since 2013 he is working together with Brazilian authorities. Here he trains the special police unit Batalhão de Operações Policiais Especiais (PMERJ) in intervention techniques. In 2015 the "Policia Environmental" became a client as well. In 2014 the Police Academy of Sri Lanka's chief port, Colombo, introduced Boehlig's program to train all police officers. Sifu Thommy Luke Boehlig continues to hold training sessions at Wing Chun schools worldwide. The media has also invited him as an expert on several occasions. He has had appearances on Bulgarian, Brazilian, Greek, German and Kuwaiti television shows, on "Inside Martial Arts TV" in the US, and MTV in Sri Lanka.

== Keynote speaker ==
Since 2019, Boehlig has been giving lectures under the name "Sifu Thommy" for companies, conferences, and organizations. He teaches how Martial Arts strategies can also be applied to the business world. He did keynote speeches at the Wirtschaftsclub Krefeld (Germany), the Deutsche Vermögensberatung, the Gemeinschaft Sozial Engagierter Unternehmen, the Deutsche Mehrwertakademie, and at the GEDANKENtanken (now Greator) Business Factory in October 2019.

In 2020 the National Aeronautics and Space Administration (NASA) booked Boehlig for their event "Ecosystems2030," and he appeared as a guest speaker at various international conferences such as the "Embodiment Conference".

== Actor ==
In 1997, Boehlig had a role as an extra in the German television series Die Wache and in 1999 in The Cry of the Butterfly. In 2023, Boehlig appeared in the film Ranger, portraying the character Torres and receiving an associate producer credit for his contributions to the project. In 2024, he starred in the science fiction film In(n)Mates as Zann and served as the film's Executive Producer. Additionally, that same year, Boehlig played Officer Luke in Michael Andres' drama Teach Her.

== Author ==
Boehlig has written and published several books and training DVDs since 2007. In 2016 he published an online learning platform for Wing Chun and produced similar programs for other martial artists, such as escrima Grandmaster Rene Latosa.

== Other activities and social engagement ==
Boehlig volunteers with non-profit organizations. In 2014, actor Dirk Heinrichs appointed Thommy Boehlig as a scientific advisor in the field of "de-escalation and safety techniques" for the initiative "Sprache gegen Gewalt e.V." (Language against Violence). Since 2017, Boehlig is an ambassador of the non-profit foundation "It ́s for Kids". He informs and lectures on family protection, violence prevention, self-assertion, and self-defense.

== Awards and achievements ==
- 2000 Scottish Deputy National Wing Tsun Coach with the European Wing Tsun Organisation
- 2002 Scottish national trainer for Wing Tsun with the European Wing Tsun Organisation
- 2002 Awarded the title of Sifu
- 2005 Appointed as a trainer for sports and fitness managers by the Chamber of Industry and Commerce of Cologne (Germany)
- 2005 Appointed as Wing Chun Master
- 2007 Awarded the title of Dai Sifu
- 2009 Appointed the title of Grand Master for Wing Chun kung fu
- 2019 Appointed as honorary chairman of the Fatsaan Wing Chun Organization by the 1st chairman Master Gwok Wai Jaam
- 2019 Awarded by the Chinese provincial government in Guangdong as a preserver and mediator of intangible cultural heritage

== Filmography ==
- 1997: Die Wache, RTL (1 episode)
- 1999: The Cry of the Butterfly; Director: Frank Strecker
- 2007: Wing Tsjun – Die DVD (Lehr-DVD)
- 2023: Ranger; Director: Phil Ramcke, Nico Quijano & James Percifal
- 2024: In(n)mates; Director: James Percifal
- 2024: Teach Her; Director: Michael Andres

== Publications ==
=== Books ===
- 2007 The Art of Fighting ("Die Kunst des Kämpfens")
- 2019 Ten Ways to Success ("Zehn Wege zum Erfolg") – Audiobook

=== Others ===
- 2007 Wing Tsjun – The DVD (Lehr-DVD "Wing Tsjun – Die DVD")
- 2015 BDS Wing Tsjun International Martial Arts App
