= Leduc 0.10 =

First aircraft flying with a ramjet engine

0.10
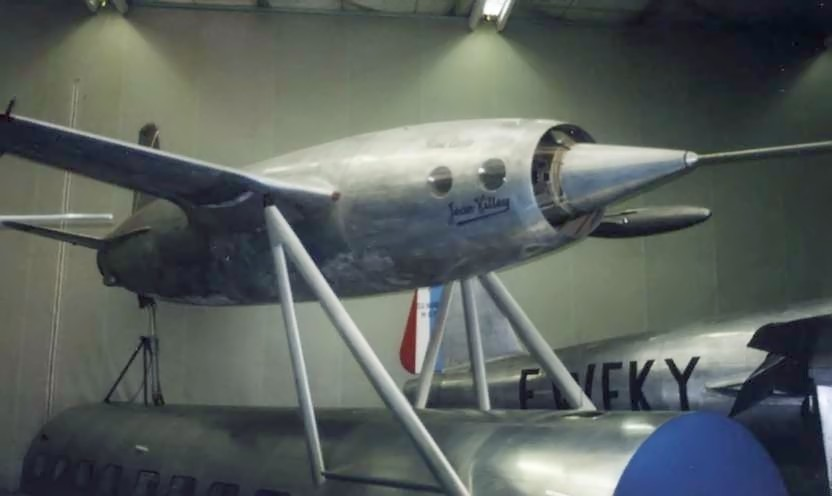
- Leduc 0.10 preserved at the Musée de l'Air et de l'Espace at Le Bourget

General information
- Type: Research aircraft
- National origin: France
- Manufacturer: Breguet Aviation
- Designer: René Leduc
- Number built: 3

History
- First flight: 21 October 1947

The Leduc 0.10 is a research aircraft built in France, one of the world's first aircraft to fly powered solely by a ramjet.

== Design and development ==
Designed by René Leduc in 1938, it was built at the Breguet Aviation factory after a protracted, semi-secret construction phase kept at arm's length from German occupation authorities, and was finally completed in 1947. The aircraft featured a double-walled fuselage, with the pilot controlling the aircraft from within the inner shell. The circular gap between this and the outer, cylindrical shell provided the inlet for the ramjet.

== Testing ==
It could not take off unassisted (ramjets cannot produce thrust at zero airspeed and thus cannot move an aircraft from a standstill) and was therefore a parasite aircraft intended to be carried aloft by a mother ship, such as the four-engined AAS 01A & -B German-origin designs or the French-designed Sud-Est Languedoc four-engined airliners, and released at altitude. Following test flights of the SE.161 Languedoc/Leduc 0.10 composite, independent unpowered gliding tests began in October 1947. After three such flights, the first powered flight from atop an Languedoc mother ship was made on 21 April 1949 over Toulouse. Released in a shallow dive at an altitude of 3,050 m (10,010 ft), the engine was tested at half power for twelve minutes, propelling the aircraft to 680 km/h (420 mph).

In subsequent tests, the 0.10 reached a top speed of Mach 0.85 and demonstrated the viability of the ramjet as an aviation powerplant, with a rate of climb of 40 m/s (7,900 ft/min) to 11,000 metres (36,000 ft), exceeding that of the best jet fighters of the time.

Of the two 0.10s originally built, one was destroyed in a crash in 1951 and the other severely damaged in another crash the following year. Both pilots survived with serious injuries.

== 0.11/ 0.16/ Third 0.10 ==
In addition to these, a third aircraft was built, designated 0.11 (0.16 in one source). Generally similar to the 0.10, it featured a Turbomeca Marbore I turbojet on each wingtip, to provide better control during landings. This first flew on 8 February 1951, but was converted back to 0.10 standards (and thereafter referred to as Leduc 010 n°03) a few months later after problems occurred, including misting of the pilot's windows, powerplant synchronization, and wing deflection caused by the turbojets. The engines were replaced by inert mass balances. This aircraft flew 83 test flights, and is preserved at Le Bourget.

== Subsequent prototypes ==
The larger Leduc 0.21 flew from an air launch on 16 May 1953, and the swept wing supersonic Leduc 0.22 interceptor began testing on 26 December 1956 with a SNECMA Atar turbojet before the program was terminated in 1958.

== Specifications (0.10) ==
Data from

General characteristics

- Crew: two
- Length: 10.25 m (33 ft 7 in)
- Wingspan: 10.52 m (34 ft 6 in)
- Wing area: 16.0 m^{2} (172 sq ft)
- Empty weight: 1,700 kg (3,740 lb)
- Gross weight: 2,800 kg (6,173 lb)
- Powerplant: 1 × Leduc ramjet , 15.7 kN (3,520 lbf) thrust

Performance

- Maximum speed: 800 km/h (500 mph, 430 kn)

== See also ==
Related development

- Leduc 0.21
- Leduc 0.22

Aircraft of comparable role, configuration, and era

- Miles M.52
