= Tommy Thormann =

German politician (born 1994)

Member of the Landtag of Mecklenburg-Vorpommern
- Assuming office 20 October 2026
- Succeeding: Heiko Miraß
- Constituency: Vorpommern-Rügen IV

Personal details
- Born: 1994 (age 31–32)
- Party: Alternative for Germany (since 2016)

Tommy Thormann (born 1994) is a German politician serving as a member of the Landtag of Mecklenburg-Vorpommern since 2026. He has served as second deputy mayor of Sassnitz since 2024. He is a Neonazi, a friend of Andreas Kalbitz and under Observation of the Federal Office for the Protection of the Constitution.
