= Tom Rooney =

Tom Rooney may refer to:

- Tom Rooney (actor), Canadian actor in The Day After Tomorrow
- Tom Rooney (Florida politician) (born 1970), United States Representative from Florida's 17th (and previously 16th) Congressional District
- Tom Rooney (Illinois politician) (born 1968), member of the Illinois Senate
- Tom Rooney (racing driver) (1881–1939), American racecar driver
