= Thomas Kennedy (violin maker) =

English violin maker

Thomas Kennedy (1784–1870 in London) was a luthier, best known for his cellos.

== Early work ==
After a first apprenticeship by his father John, he further developed his skills with Thomas Powell, to whom he was apprenticed June 17, 1795. He started to work for the renowned William Forster (III) in 1802, and as soon as 1804 he became independent and established his workshop 16 Princes Street. Many of the most famous makers of his time worked for him, as for an example James Brown and later some of the best bow makers, including Thomas Tubbs, James Dodd and Edward Dodd. William Forster (IV) also made instruments for him starting in 1810, as did John Crowther later.

== Independent workshop ==
In 1813 Kennedy opened his own workshop in 16, Nassau Street and three years later, in 1816, he opened a larger shop at 364 Oxford Street. He remained in the same shop till June 1849.

After the second half of the century, Thomas Kennedy continued to work from various addresses: 4 Cummings Place, 4 King's Road, and 164 Pentonville Road. He and his workers were supplying instruments to the firm of Goulding, D’Almaine & Co. Sometimes their brand is to be found beneath the back button.

== Work quality ==
Kennedy was a prolific maker, working in various grades, from unpurfled instruments with thin dark and cracked varnish to distinguished and superbly finished instruments with a fine transparent spirit varnish. He was well known to experiment and built some of his instruments with the bass-bar and the table carved out of a single slab of wood, in opposition to his prime work where the bar was glued on the inside of the table, like the Italian masters did. Today, very few instruments still bear the original design however, as most were restored or upgraded.

His cellos are best known, and are often prized as soloists instruments. The model is usually made on a distinctive shortened Nicola Amati model with long middle bouts. The heads are usually carved in the style of Nicola Amati, however with more deeply curved chins, but earlier models also have a typical Jacob Stainer head, in the style of his teacher William Forster.

He produced an estimated 50 high quality double-basses and a few chamber-basses too, based on a smaller model.

Most of his work is signed in pencil on the inner surface of the table, and occasionally in ink above the endpin on the lower ribs. The bows produced in his workshop had originally open ivory frogs.
