= Tom Jennings (disambiguation) =

Tom Jennings (born 1955) is an American artist and technician, creator of FidoNet.

Tom or Thomas Jennings may also refer to:

- Tom Jennings (pool player) (born 1951), American pool player and mathematics professor
- Tom Jennings (footballer) (1902–1973), Scottish footballer
- Tom Jennings (cricketer) (1896–1972), English cricketer
- Thomas Albert Jennings (1865–1917), Florida politician
- Thomas L. Jennings (1791–1856), African-American tradesman and abolitionist
- Thomas Walter Jennings (1917–1978), founder of Jennings Organ Company
- Thomas J. Jennings (1801–1881), American lawyer and politician in Texas

== See also ==
- Thomas Jennings Bailey (1867–1963), American judge
