= Thomas Wray =

Australian cricketer (1827–1877)

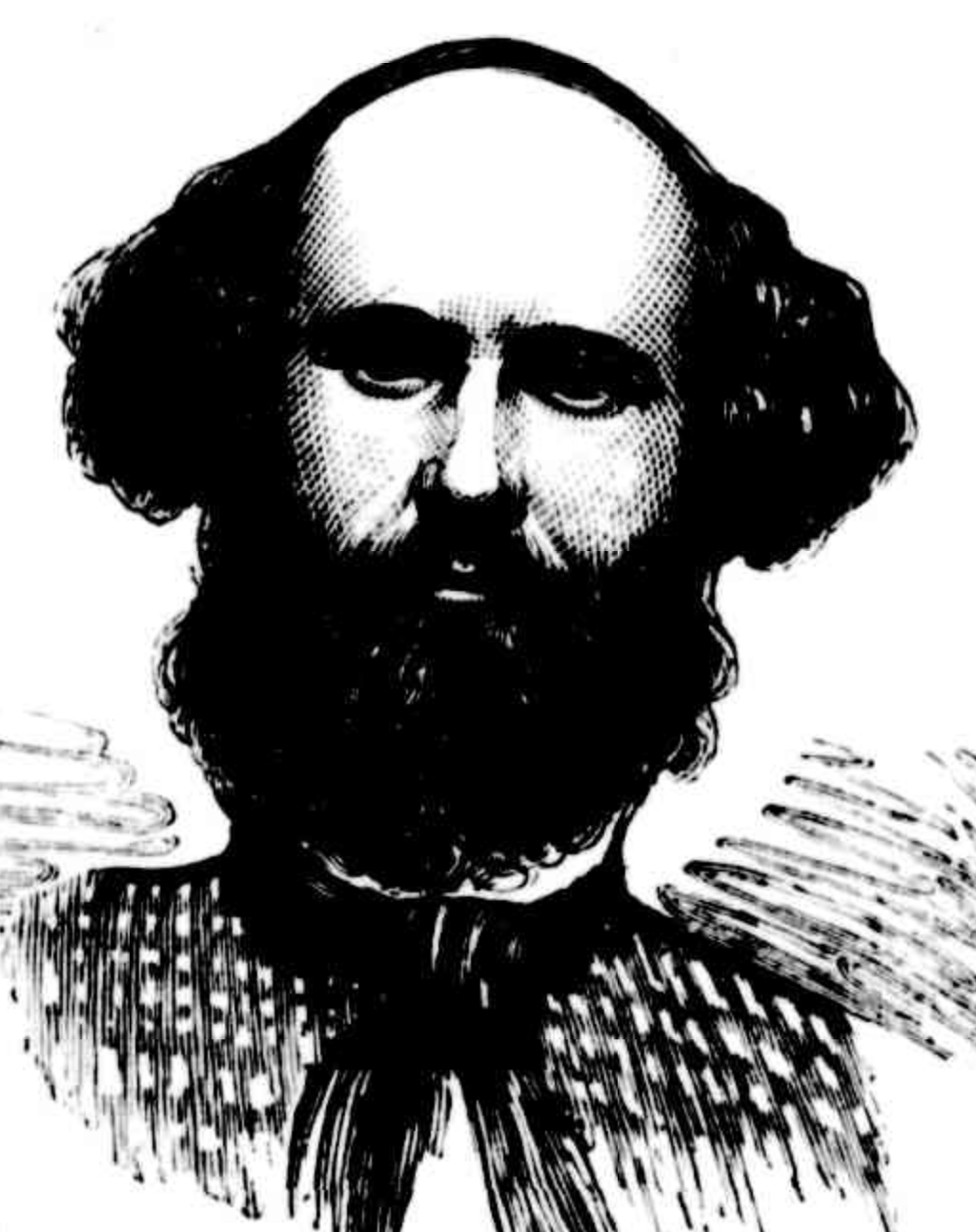

Personal information
- Full name: Thomas Fawcett Wray
- Born: 1827; Cleasby, Yorkshire, England
- Died: 6 September 1877 (aged 49–50); Melbourne, Australia
- Batting: Right-handed

Domestic team information
- Years: Team
- 1857/58–1859/60: Victoria
- First-class debut: 11 January 1858 Victoria v New South Wales
- Last First-class: 2 February 1860 Victoria v New South Wales

Career statistics
Competition	FC
Matches	3
Runs scored	58
Batting average	11.60
100s/50s	0/0
Top score	26
Balls bowled	0
Wickets	–
Bowling average	–
5 wickets in innings	–
10 wickets in match	–
Best bowling	–
Catches/stumpings	0/–
- Source: Cricinfo, 2 May 2015

Thomas Fawcett Wray (1827 – 6 September 1877) was an Australian cricketer and Australian rules footballer, playing for the Melbourne football club. He played in three first-class cricket matches for Victoria between 1858 and 1860.

== See also ==
- List of Victoria first-class cricketers
