= Tom Chambers =

Tom or Thomas Chambers may refer to:

== Government and politics ==
- Sir Thomas Chambers (colonial administrator) (died 1692), British administrator and factor of the British East India Company in Madras
- Sir Thomas Chambers (British politician) (1814–1891), English politician
- Thomas Jefferson Chambers (1840–1929), member of the Texas House of Representatives
- Tom Chambers (politician) (1928–2018), member of the Legislative Assembly of Alberta
- Tom Chambers (judge) (1943–2013), Associate Justice of the Washington State Supreme Court

== Sports ==
- Thomas Chambers (English cricketer) (1677–1750), English cricketer and patron, son of the colonial administrator
- Thomas Chambers (footballer) (fl. 1892–1897), Scottish international footballer
- Tom Chambers (bowls) (fl. 1930), Canadian lawn bowls player
- Thomas Chambers (cricketer) (1931–2015), South African cricketer
- Tom Chambers (basketball) (born 1959), American basketball player

== Others ==
- Thomas Chambers (painter) (1808–1869), English-born American maritime and landscape painter
- Tom Chambers (trade unionist) (1867–1926), British trade union leader
- Tom Chambers (actor) (born 1977), English actor
- Thomas Chambers (born 1990), Canadian actor, twin brother of Munro Chambers

== See also ==
- Thomas Chalmers (1780–1847), Scottish minister
- Thomas Chambers Hine (1814–1899), English architect
