= Tom Dooley =

Tom or Thomas Dooley may refer to:

== Folk figure ==
- Tom Dula (1845–1868), American figure of folk legend hanged in North Carolina for murder
  - "Tom Dooley" (song), American folksong based upon the above incident
  - The Legend of Tom Dooley, a 1959 film starring Michael Landon, based on the folk song

== People ==
- Thomas Anthony Dooley III (1927–1961), American humanitarian who worked in Laos and Vietnam
- Thomas Dooley (born 1961), retired German-American footballer
- Thomas E. Dooley, American media executive
- Thomas P. Dooley, Judeo-Christian author, biomedical scientist, inventor
- Tom Dooley (American football) (1934–2018), American football official
- Tom Dooley (racewalker) (born 1945), American race walker at the 1968 and 1972 Olympics
- Tom Dooley (editor) (born 1970), American magazine editor
- Tom Dooley (footballer) (1914–1975), English footballer
- Tom Dooley (politician) (1880–1958), American politician from Nebraska

== See also ==
- Thomas Dooley Elementary School, Illinois
