= Thomas Browne (physician, 1672–1710) =

English physician

- Born: 1672; London, England
- Died: 1710 (aged 37–38)
- Occupation: Physician

Thomas Browne (1672–1710) was an English physician.

== Biography ==
Browne was the son of Dr. Edward Browne, president of the College of Physicians, and thus grandson of Thomas Browne, the author of 'Religio Medici'. He was born in London, and baptised on 21 January 1672–3. His childhood was spent with his grandfather at Norwich, as is known from the numerous references to 'Tomey' in Sir T. Browne's correspondence with his son. He entered Trinity College, Cambridge, and proceeded M.B. in 1695, M.D. 1700. He was admitted a candidate of the College of Physicians on 30 September 1704, and a fellow on 30 September 1707 (Munk). In 1698 he married his cousin Alethea, daughter of Henry Fairfax, but had no issue. He inherited his father's estate at Northfleet, Kent, and (according to a statement in Le Neve's pedigree of the Brownes, printed in Simon Wilkin's 'life and Works of Sir T. Browne') died in 1710, in consequence of a fall from his horse. Browne was not eminent as a physician, and what interest attaches to his memory is chiefly through his family connections. He wrote, however, a curious account of an antiquarian tour through England in company with Dr. Robert Plot (historian of Oxfordshire, &c.), which exists in manuscript in the British Museum (Sloane 1899), and is printed in Wilkin's work above cited.
