= Tommi Virtanen =

Finnish ice hockey player (born 1989)

- Born: March 4, 1989 (age 36) Turku, Finland
- Height: 5 ft 9 in (175 cm)
- Weight: 163 lb (74 kg; 11 st 9 lb)
- Position: Goaltender
- Caught: Left
- Played for: TPS
- NHL draft: Undrafted
- Playing career: 2009–2016

Tommi Virtanen (born March 4, 1989) is a Finnish former ice hockey goaltender.

Virtanen played one game with TPS of the Finnish SM-liiga during the 2010–11 season.
