= Thomas Daniel Kennedy =

American lawyer

Thomas Daniel Kennedy (1849?-November 25, 1877) was an American lawyer and politician.

Kennedy was the son of Daniel Kennedy. He was a graduate of the New Haven High School, and after studying law (partly in the office of Timothy J. Fox, Esq.) and graduating from Yale Law School in 1874, began practice in New Haven. In April, 1875, he was elected on the Democratic ticket as one of the representatives of New Haven in the Connecticut State Legislature. His health, always delicate, prevented his further participation in business or politics after the year 1875.

He died at his father's residence in New Haven, Conn., after a lingering illness, of paralysis of the brain, November 25, 1877, aged 28 years.
