= Leduc, Missouri =

Extinct town in the US state of Missouri

Coordinates: 38.199212°N 91.593493°W

Leduc is an extinct town in Gasconade County, in the U.S. state of Missouri.

A post office called Leduc was established in 1875, and remained in operation until 1895. The community has the name of the local Leduc family.
