= Tom Erlandson =

Tom Erlandson may refer to:

- Tom Erlandson (linebacker, born 1940), NFL linebacker for the Denver Broncos, Miami Dolphins, San Diego Chargers, and Washington State University
- Tom Erlandson (linebacker, born 1966), NFL linebacker for the Buffalo Bills and Washington Huskies
- Tom Erlandon, a member of the Chautauqua County Legislature in Chautauqua County, New York
