= Tom Mullen =

Tom Mullen may refer to:

- Tom Mullen (American football) (born 1951), American football offensive lineman
- Tom Mullen (Australian footballer) (1868–1942), Australian rules footballer

== See also ==
- Tom Mullens (1900–1961), Australian rules footballer
- Thomas Mullen (1896–1966), Irish politician
- Thomas Mullen (author) (born 1974), American novelist
