= Tom Whitestone =

American athletics administrator (1964–2026)

Current position
- Title: AAD (Associate Athletic Director)

Biographical details
- Born: April 10, 1964; Pittsfield, Massachusetts, U.S.
- Died: September 8, 2026 (aged 62); Harrisburg, North Carolina, U.S.

Accomplishments and honors

Awards
- Berkshire County Sports Hall of Fame (2019); UNC Charlotte Student-Athlete Advisory Committee Lifetime Achievement Award (2020); UNC Charlotte Athletics Hall of Fame (2026)

Thomas Elkin Whitestone (April 10, 1964 – September 8, 2026) was an American college athletics administrator. He served as the Associate Athletic Director at the University of North Carolina at Charlotte for 37 years, until his retirement in 2024. Whitestone was featured in the Berkshire County Sports Hall of Fame in 2019 and the UNC Charlotte Athletics Hall of Fame in 2026.

== Early life ==
Thomas Elkin Whitestone was born in Pittsfield, Massachusetts, on April 10, 1964. He was the son of W. S. Peter, and his wife, Jane Stephenson Whitestone. Whitestone had three siblings, Kenneth, Robert, and Stephen Whitestone. He studied elementary at Cheshire, before graduating from Pittsfield High School.

== Career ==
Whitestone started his career when he got a job at the University of North Carolina. He joined the athletics department in 1987 as Director of Sports Information for over 37 years before his retirement in 2024. He became the spokesperson for Charlotte 49ers. While in his term, he had work relations with many associations such as National Collegiate Athletic Association and College Sports Communicators. He got featured for being one of the people that created the 2013 Charlotte 49ers football team. In 2020, he created the UNC Charlotte Athletics Hall of Fame, he received the UNC Charlotte Student-Athlete Advisory Committee (SAAC) Lifetime Achievement Award in the same year. He later retired in 2024.

== Personal life and death ==
Whitestone was married to Kim Whitestone, they had two children together, Sam and Allie Whitestone.

Whitestone died from cancer at Harrisburg, North Carolina, on September 8, 2026, at the age of 62.

== Legacy ==
"Tom Whitestone loved our university, He had the gift of bringing a story to life, especially when focusing on our student-athletes. He did not just give our fans the stats. He found a way to memorialize important games, events, and individuals. He truly bled green.", Judy Rose, who was the Athletic Director Emerita of the university, said mourning his death. University of North Carolina named him to the sixth induction class of the UNC Charlotte Athletics Hall of Fame.
