= Tom Insko =

American businessman

12th President of Eastern Oregon University
- In office July 1, 2015 – August 31, 2022
- Preceded by: Bob Davies
- Succeeded by: Lana Moore (interim) and Richard Chaves (interim)

Personal details
- Born: Eastern Oregon, U.S.
- Education: Eastern Oregon University (BS); College of William & Mary (MBA)

Tom Insko is an American businessman and former academic administrator who served as the 12th president of Eastern Oregon University from 2015 to 2022.

== Career ==
Insko replaced outgoing President Bob Davies, who became President of Murray State University. Jay Kenton, a former administrator at the University of Oregon served as interim president before Insko took office. Insko stepped down as president in 2022.
