= René Leduc =

René Henri Leduc
- Born: April 24, 1898; Saint-Germain-lès-Corbeil, Essonne, France
- Died: March 9, 1968 (aged 69); Istres, France
- Military career
- Allegiance: France
- Branch: French Army
- Service years: 1916–1918
- Rank: Officer
- Conflicts: World War I
- Other work: Aerospace Engineer, Founder of Hydro Leduc

René Henri Leduc (French pronunciation: [ʁəne ɑ̃ʁi lədyk]; April 24, 1898 – March 9, 1968) was a French engineer and aircraft manufacturer, known for his work in ramjet propulsion. Leduc's designs, including the Leduc 010, 016, 021, and 022, were important in advancing supersonic aviation technology. After cancellation of French Aviation Ministry's contracts for the Leduc ramjet aircraft projects, in 1958 Leduc's company converted from aeronautics to hydraulics, becoming known as Hydro Leduc and eventually focusing on production of hydraulic pumps for excavators.

== Early life ==
René Henri Leduc was born on April 24, 1898, in Saint-Germain-lès-Corbeil, Essonne, France. Leduc's early education ended at 14 when he began working as an apprentice mechanic and later as a clerk in a foundry. During World War I, he joined the artillery, fought on the front lines, and graduated as a top-ranking officer from the Fontainebleau cadet training school. After the war, Leduc pursued an engineering degree at the École Supérieure d'Électricité, specializing in thermodynamics and material resistance.

== Career Beginnings ==
In 1922, René Leduc began his professional journey as the deputy director of a cellulose factory in Wörgl, Austria. He returned to France in 1924 after his father's death and joined the Louis Breguet's workshops, where he quickly rose to head of the calculation office. During this time, he worked on various projects, including the Breguet 27, a two-seater observation aircraft. Leduc's academic pursuits paralleled his professional growth; in 1929, he defended a thesis on prismatic beams at the University of Paris. This work, combined with his passion for aerodynamics, led him to file his first patent for an intermittent reaction thruster, a propulsion system that would later inspire the pulse jet engines used in the German V-1 flying bombs.

In 1933, Leduc filed a second patent on the thermo-propulsive nozzle, the foundation of ramjet propulsion. This innovation caught the attention of Louis Breguet and the French Ministry of Aviation, providing Leduc with funding and support to conduct experimental tests. These efforts culminated in the development of small-scale prototypes that demonstrated the potential of ramjet propulsion. By 1937, Leduc began constructing the Leduc 010, the first French jet aircraft powered solely by a ramjet engine.

== Leduc aircraft ==
=== Leduc 010 (1945–1949) ===
The Leduc 010 was the first aircraft powered by a ramjet engine to achieve flight. On April 21, 1949, it performed its maiden powered flight, marking a historic milestone in aviation.

==== Leduc 016, 021, and 022 (1949–1958) ====
The Leduc 016 served as an experimental upgrade of the 010, while the Leduc 021 incorporated improved aerodynamics, debuting at the 1955 Paris Air Show. The Leduc 022 represented the pinnacle of Leduc's designs, featuring a turbojet for autonomous takeoff. Despite its potential as a supersonic interceptor, financial constraints led to the project's cancellation in 1958.

== Later life and death ==
After the abrupt termination of the Leduc 022 program in 1958, René Leduc shifted his focus to hydraulic equipment manufacturing. He founded Hydro Leduc, which specialized in hydraulic technologies and continued his legacy of innovation. Based in Azerailles, France, the company flourished, employing over 200 workers and earning a reputation for precision engineering.

René Leduc remained at the helm of his company until his death in Istres, France, on March 9, 1968. His contributions to aeronautical engineering secure his place in the history of aerospace innovation.
