= Leduc 0.21 =

French research aircraft

0.21
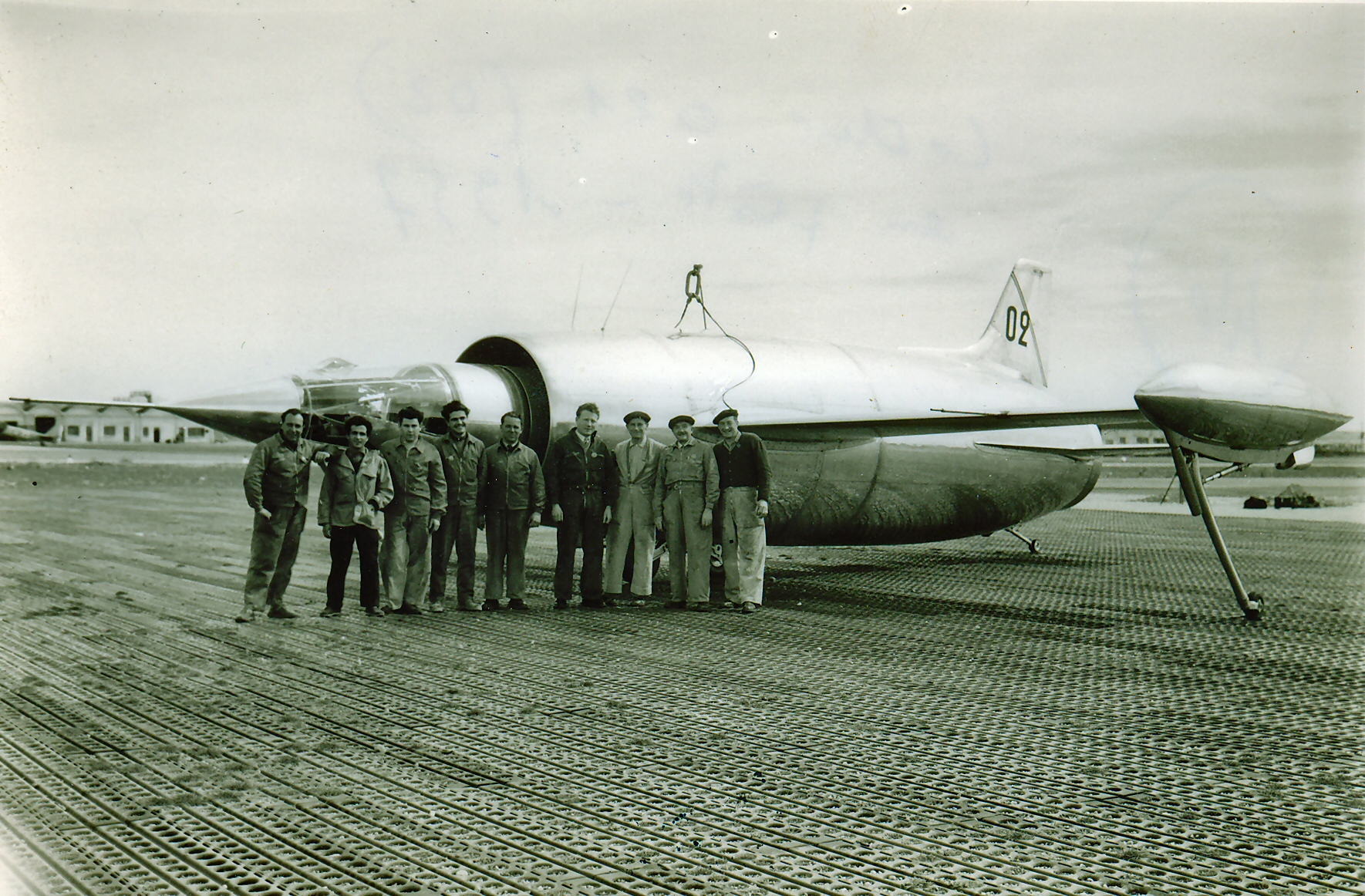
- Leduc 0.20

General information
- Type: Research aircraft
- National origin: France
- Manufacturer: Breguet
- Designer: René Leduc
- Number built: 2

History
- First flight: 7 August 1953

The Leduc 0.21 was a research aircraft built in France in 1953 to refine the practicalities of ramjet propulsion. Initially proposed as the 0.20, it was essentially similar to its predecessor, the Leduc 0.10, but scaled up by around 30%, with tip tanks added to the wings. It was not capable of take-off under its own power, and had to be carried aloft and released.

Two examples were built and completed a very detailed flight test program from 1953 to 1956 to develop automated, operationally viable throttle controls for the ramjet. This included a total of 284 free flights. Designed for subsonic speeds only, the 0.21 reached a top speed of Mach 0.95.

== Specifications ==
Data from Jane's All the World's Aircraft 1956–57

General characteristics

- Crew: One
- Length: 12.50 m (41 ft 0 in)
- Wingspan: 11.60 m (38 ft 1 in)
- Height: 2.75 m (9 ft 0 in)
- Wing area: 22.0 m^{2} (237 sq ft)
- Empty weight: 3,800 kg (8,378 lb)
- Gross weight: 6,000 kg (13,228 lb)
- Powerplant: 1 × Leduc ramjet, 64 kN (14,300 lbf) thrust

Performance

- Maximum speed: Mach 0.87
- Endurance: 15 minutes
- Service ceiling: 20,000 m (66,000 ft)
- Rate of climb: 200 m/s (39,000 ft/min) at sea level

== Bibliography ==
- Bridgman, Leonard (1956). Jane's All the World's Aircraft 1956–57. New York: The McGraw-Hill Book Company.
- Buttler, Tony & Delezenne, Jean-Louis (2012). X-Planes of Europe: Secret Research Aircraft from the Golden Age 1946–1974. Manchester, UK: Hikoki Publications. ISBN 978-1-902-10921-3.
- Carbonel, Jean-Christophe (2016). French Secret Projects. Vol. 1: Post War Fighters. Manchester, UK: Crecy Publishing. ISBN 978-1-91080-900-6.
- Taylor, Michael J. H. (1989). Jane's Encyclopedia of Aviation. London: Studio Editions. p. 570.
- World Aircraft Information Files. London: Bright Star Publishing. pp. File 900 Sheet 5.
