= Thomas Kenny =

Thomas Kenny or Tom Kenny may refer to:

- Thomas Kenny (VC) (1882–1948), English recipient of the Victoria Cross
- Thomas Edward Kenny (1833–1908), merchant and political figure in Nova Scotia, Canada
- Thomas F. Kenny (1847–?), tanner and political figure in New Brunswick, Canada
- Thomas J. Kenny (politician) (1863–1926), American politician who held office in Boston
- Tom Kenny (born 1962), American actor and comedian, best known for voicing SpongeBob SquarePants in SpongeBob SquarePants
- Tom Kenny (hurler) (born 1981), Irish hurler
- Tom Kenny (rugby league), rugby league footballer of the 1930s for England, and Salford
- Tom 'Cork' Kenny, Irish journalist, editor and founder of the Connacht Tribune
- Thomas W. Kenny, American engineer

== See also ==
- Thomas Kelly-Kenny (1840–1914), British Army general
- Kenneth Thomas (disambiguation)
