= Tom Brown (apple hunter) =

American apple hunter and orchardist

- Born: Clemmons, North Carolina, U.S.
- Occupations: Apple hunter; orchardist
- Website: www.applesearch.org

Tom Brown is an American apple hunter and orchardist. Brown focuses on discovering "lost" heirloom apple varietals in North Carolina and throughout Appalachia.

== Life ==
Brown was born in rural North Carolina. A chemical engineer at one time employed by the R.J. Reynolds Tobacco Company, Brown retired from his job in the late 1990s. Brown first encountered heritage apples at a stand run by Maurice Marshall at a farmer's market in 1998. Marshall and Brown discussed rediscovering lost apple varieties which had exited commercial production, piquing Brown's interest. The first apple Brown rediscovered was of a variety known as "Yellow Potts". Brown discovered the apple in Iredell County in the year after speaking with Marshall. Since 1999, Brown has found some 1200 "lost" apple varieties.

Searching for lost varieties generally involves interviewing residents in rural parts of Appalachia who may have knowledge of where to find apple trees, and finding defunct orchards, some of which may have become reincorporated into forests. Brown also displays rare apple varieties at events such as farmer's markets in Appalachia each year, where he receives information from attendees about locations for him to investigate.

Brown cultivates heirloom varieties at his own orchard, including Royal Lemon, Night Dropper, and Rabun Bald.

== See also ==
- Agricultural biodiversity
