= Tom Sloan =

Tom, Thomas or Tommy Sloan may refer to:

- Thomas Sloan (1870–1941), Irish and British politician
- Tom Sloan (footballer, born 1880), Scottish international footballer
- Tom Sloan (footballer, born 1900) (1900–1973), Irish international footballer
- Tom Sloan (television executive) (1919–1970), British television executive, broadcaster, and journalist
- Thomas Sloan (Kansas politician) (born 1946), member of the Kansas House of Representatives
- Tom Sloan (footballer, born 1959), also known as Tommy Sloan, Northern Irish footballer
- Tommy Sloan (footballer, born 1925) (1925–2010), Scottish football player (Heart of Midlothian)
- Tommy Sloan (footballer, born 1964), Scottish football player and manager (Auchinleck Talbot)
- Thomas L. Sloan (1863–1940), first Native American lawyer to argue before the U.S. Supreme Court

== See also ==
- Thomas Sloane (disambiguation)
- Sloan Thomas (born 1981), former American football wide receiver
