= Tom Browne (whistler) =

Vaudeville performer

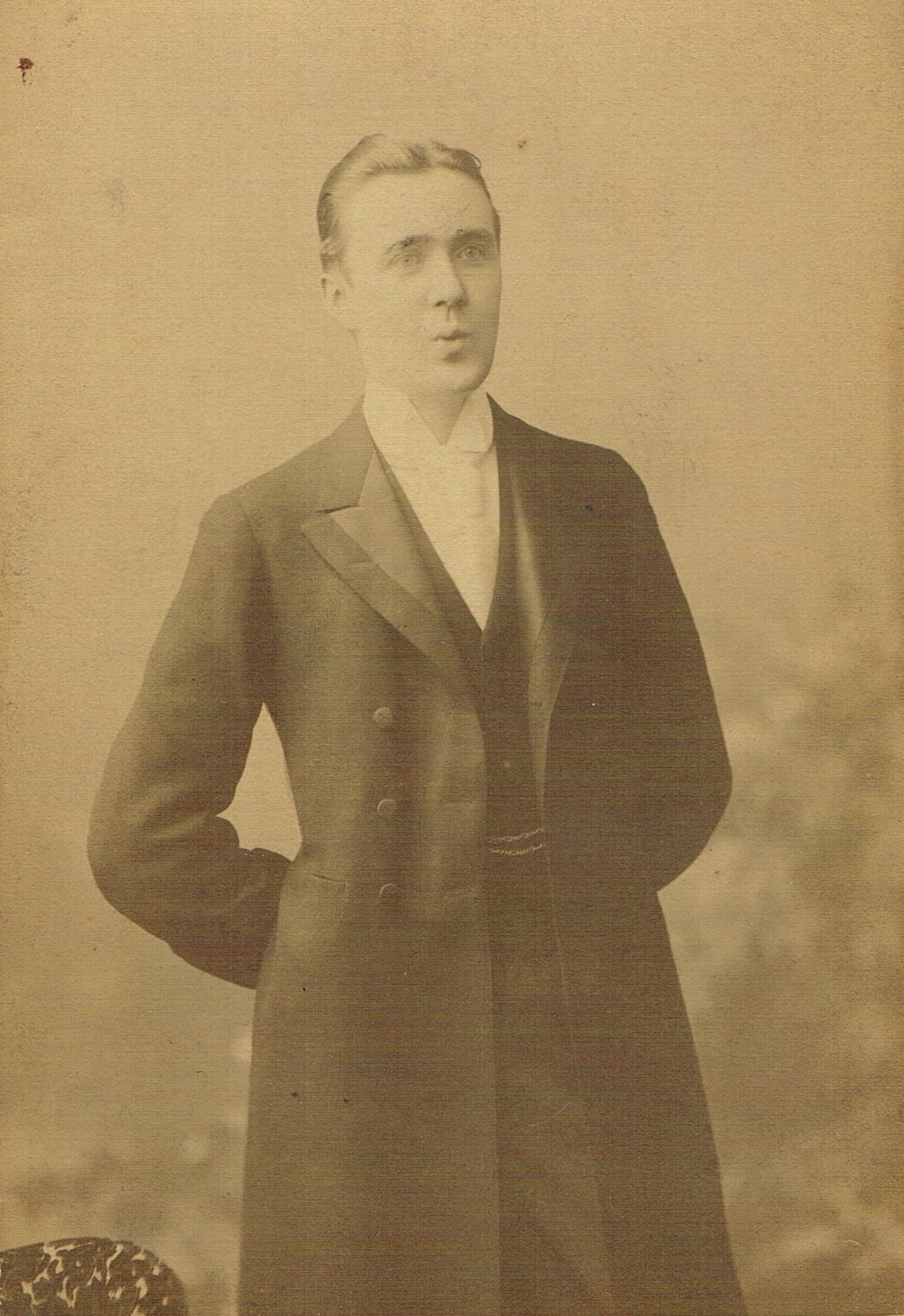
Tom Browne, c. 1894

Thomas Francis Browne (17 February 1865 – 2 January 1907), known by his stage name Tom Browne, King of Whistlers, was a music-hall and vaudeville performer who was noted for his ability to whistle two notes simultaneously.

== Early life ==
Tom Browne was born 17 February 1865 in Adams, Massachusetts, one of eight children. The family moved to Holyoke, Massachusetts, where Browne’s father worked as a paper manufacturer. Browne studied accounting and worked as bookkeeper of the Holyoke Furniture Company for 10 years before his professional career in 1891.

== Career ==
Browne’s professional career began when he joined the cast of the Byrne Brothers’ Eight Bells which toured the U.S. for the 1891–1892 season. He then performed his whistling specialty in Charles H. Hoyt’s A Trip to Chinatown on Broadway for the 1892–1893 season. In 1893–1894, he whistled in the music halls of London and Paris.

Florenz Ziegfeld hired Browne to tour with the Eugen Sandow company on a U.S. tour for the 1894–1895 season. After that, he returned to Europe for a two-year tour (1896–1898), playing in variety theaters in Germany, Switzerland, Austria, Holland, France and England.

After a U.S. tour with Charles Hoyt’s A Parlor Match (1898–1899 season), Browne toured Australia and New Zealand for a year (1899–1900 season). For the remainder of his career, Browne played primarily on the U.S. vaudeville circuit. He was engaged at the Doric Theater in Yonkers, New York, in December 1906, when he fell ill and died of tuberculosis a month later on 2 January 1907 in Yonkers. He is buried in Calvary Cemetery in Holyoke, Massachusetts.

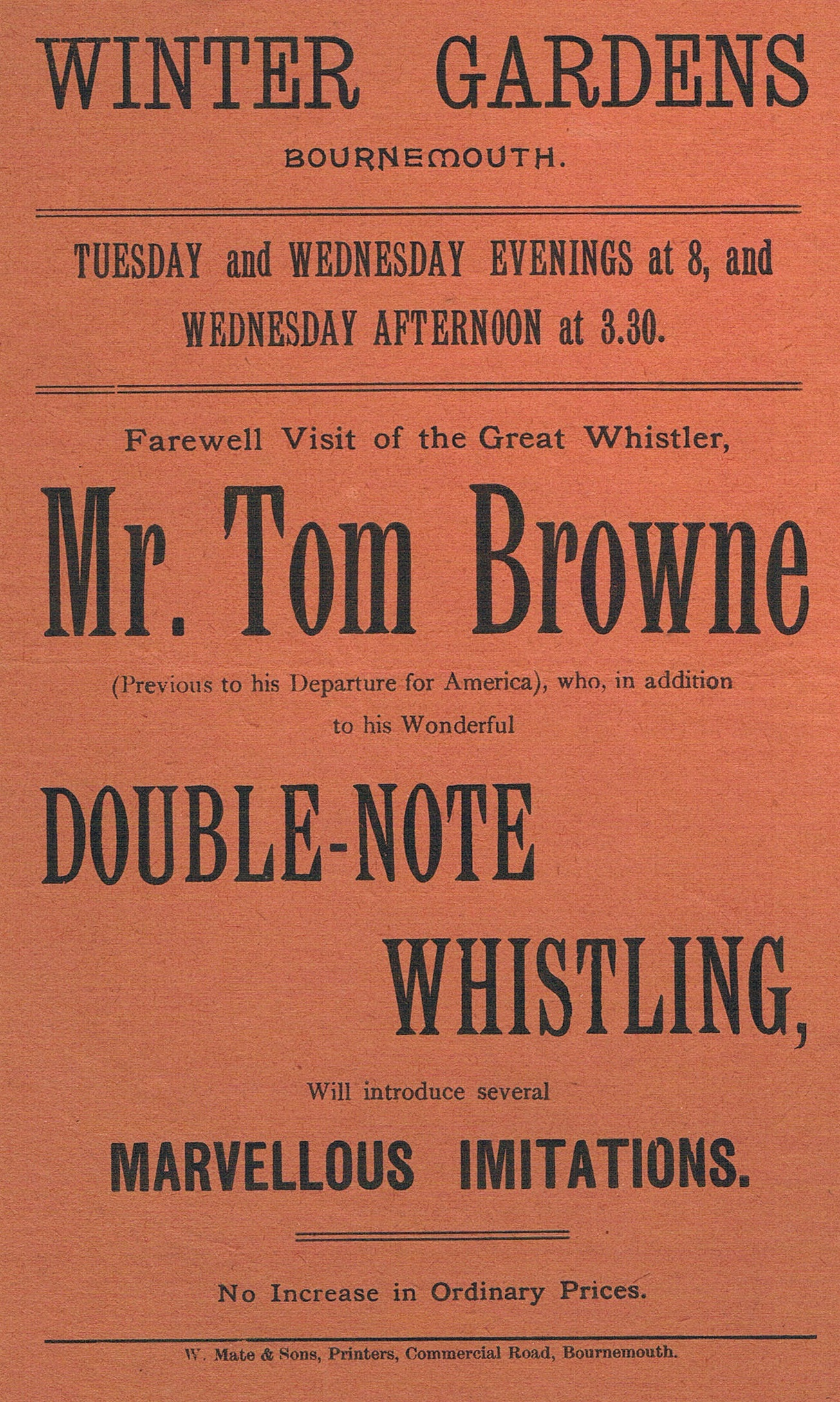
Tom Browne advertisement, c. 1894
