= Tom Tierney =

Tom Tierney may refer to:

- Tom Tierney (rugby union), Irish rugby union footballer
- Tom Tierney (artist) (1925–2014), American paper doll artist
- Tom Tierney (Kilkenny hurler) (1894–1984), Irish hurler
- Tom Tierney (Galway hurler) (born 1983), Irish hurling manager and player
