= Thomas Edwin Burton Brown =

British physician (1833-1811)

Thomas Edwin Burton Brown (February 8, 1833 - June 28, 1911) was a British brigade surgeon, demonstrator of anatomy chemical examiner, first Principal of the Lahore Medical College, and author who is best known for his work discussing his time as a physician of the Indian Medical Service. Burton Brown received his medical education at King's College School and Guy's Hospital, graduating as an M.D. of London with various honors. Throughout his career, he held notable positions in London, Calcutta, Punjab, and Lahore, which led to his appointment as a Companion of the Indian Empire (CIE).

== Family history and personal life ==
Thomas Edwin Burton Brown was born in London to British parents on February 8, 1833. His mother was Mary Brown and his father was a well-respected surgeon named Thomas Brown, who inspired his interests in the medical sciences. Burton Brown also demonstrated a passion for gardening from an early age, motivating some of his later work. He married Mary Caroline Hewlett, the daughter of Charles Hewlett of Buxtonin, at the age of 29. Together, the couple had four sons, three of whom continued the families' medical legacy, and one daughter.

Their son Frederick Hewlett Burton Brown was born on September 28, 1863, and went on to become a Master of Arts and Bachelor of Medicine through the University of Oxford, as well as an officer in the Royal Army Medical Corps. On January 12, 1865, they had their second son, Arthur Thomas Burton Brown, who earned a Bachelor of Medicine at the University of London and was a Fellow of the Royal College of Surgeons. Charles Dallas Burton Brown was born on September 5, 1866, and received a Bachelor of Arts from the University of Oxford. Their last son Gerald Burton Brown, a Surgeon R.N. who studied medicine at the University of Durham, was born on September 5, 1872. Constance Mary Burton Brown was their last child and only daughter; the date of her birth is unconfirmed.

Thomas Burton Brown died peacefully in his home in Willesden-lane Brondesbury at the age of 78 on June 28, 1911, his wife having predeceased him. He was buried at the Willesden New Cemetery in London, England.

== Education ==
Thomas Edwin Burton Brown received his medical education at the King's College School in London. He completed the clinical years of his education at Guy's Hospital and graduated as an M.D. of London with various honors (described below), as reported by The Lancet journal on December 6, 1856.

== Career ==
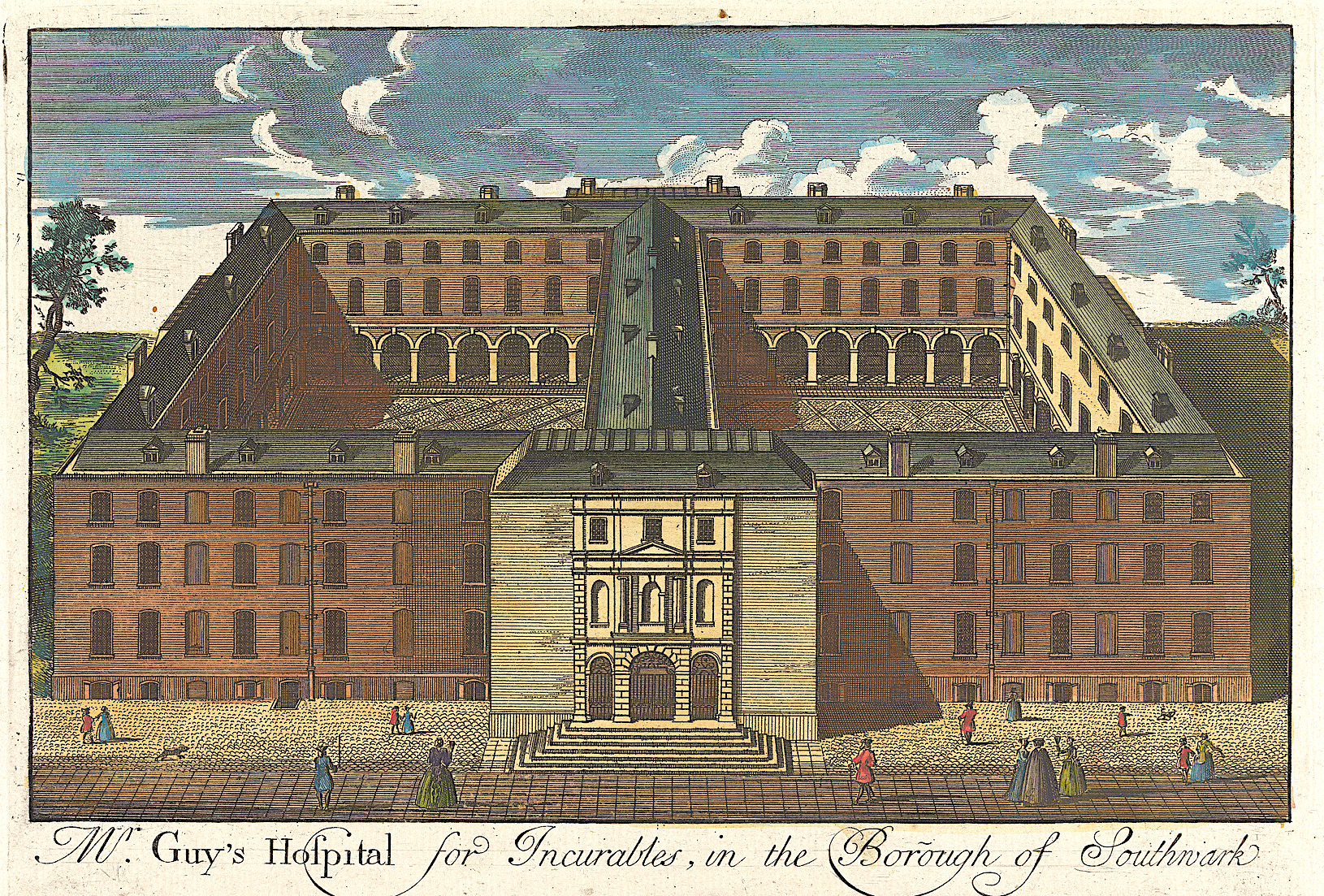
"Mr. Guy's Hospital for Incurables, in the Borough of Southwark", hand-coloured engraving, unknown 18th-century artist

Thomas Edwin Burton Brown began his professional career in 1857 as a demonstrator of anatomy, teaching students human anatomy through cadaver dissections, and a professor of natural philosophy at Guy’s Hospital. After deciding to join the Indian Medical Service, he was appointed a house surgeon of the Medical College Hospital in Calcutta in 1860. Here, he serviced primarily military officers of British India.

He was transferred a year later to be a chemical examiner in Punjab, in what is now a province in Pakistan, where he fulfilled his most notable accomplishments with the Lahore Medical School. He began as a lecturer in four subjects, Chemistry, Botany, Materia Medica, and Toxicology, and was recognized for his improvements to the Government Gardens in the Punjab capital. When the institution was transformed into a college in 1870, he served as the first Principal of Lahore Medical College, and became the head lecturer on Medicine and Physiology. During this time, he officiated as the Civil Surgeon of Lahore and at least once as the region's Meteorological Reporter. He retired in 1889. Lahore Medical College developed into the modern-day King Edward Medical University, which boasts a long list of notable alumni, including Riaz Haider, the past president of the American Heart Association.

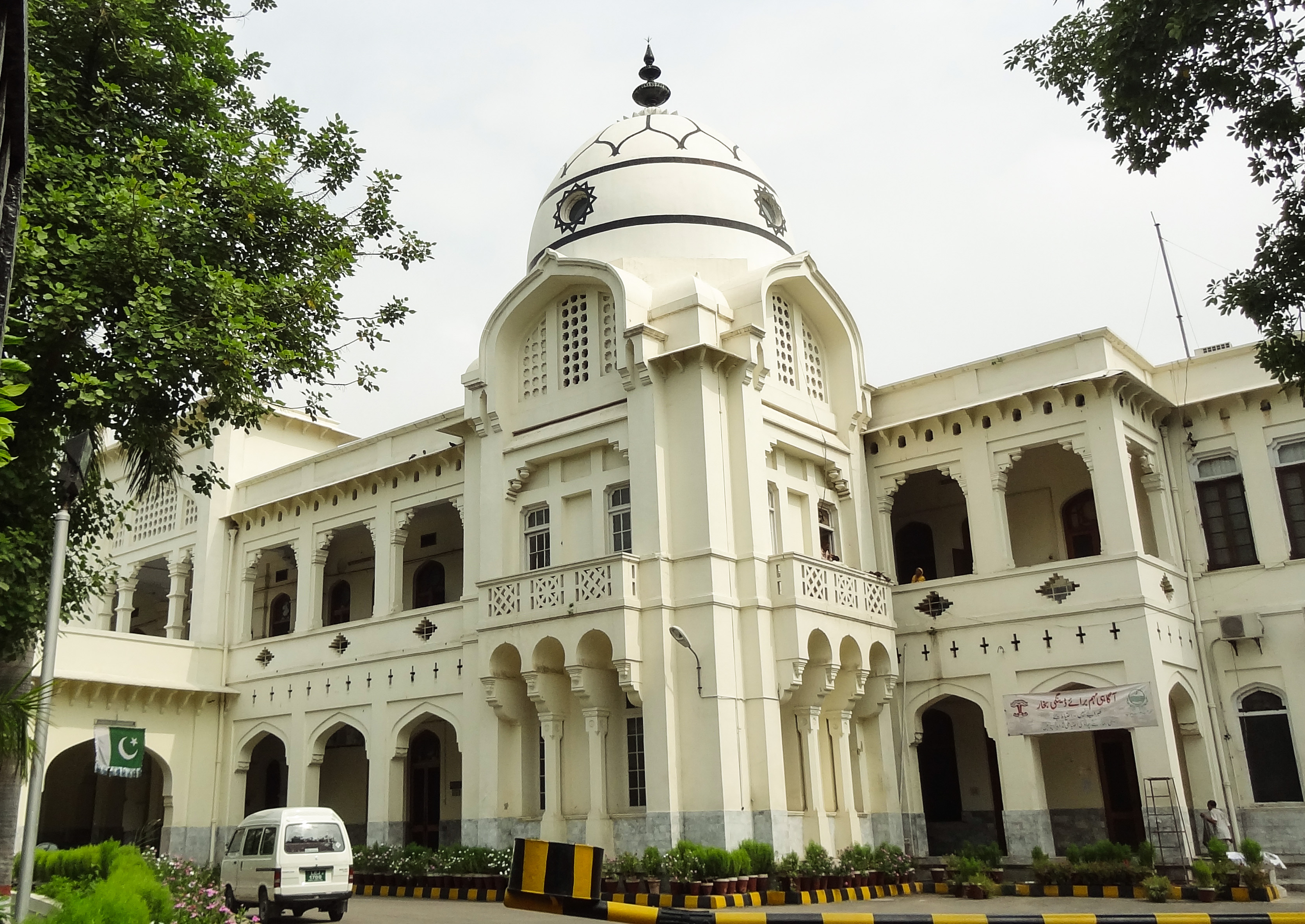
King Edward Medical University, 2012, formerly known as Lahore Medical College

After returning to England, Thomas Edwin Burton Brown began sharing his expertise as a medical tutor at the Ayerst Hostel located in Cambridge in 1890. Now in his later years, he joined and held distinguished positions in various medical societies. He was appointed an examiner of the Apothecaries Society in 1891 and served as Master of the society from 1901 to 1902. He became president of the Therapeutical Society in 1906 and went on to be elected as the Vice-President of the Royal Society of Medicine. As one of the most prominent medical societies in Britain, the RSM has had a number of famous fellows including Charles Darwin, Sigmund Freud, Sir Alexander Fleming, and Edward Jenner.

== Honors and publications ==
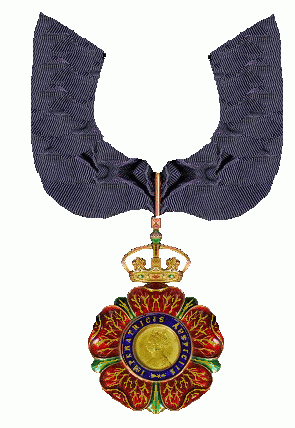
Neck Badge of a Companion of the Indian Empire (CIE) (1884–1947)

Upon graduating as an MD from Guy's Hospital, he was named an Exhibitioner and Gold Medallist in Anatomy and Materia Medica, and Gold Medallist in Botany, Surgery, and Physiology of the First Division.

While in Punjab, his monograph "On Punjab Poisons" was published in The Indian Medical Gazette. His findings were considered highly valuable as they were the first of their kind. Additionally, he published many of the medical techniques he developed in issues such as "On the Use of the Rectum in Operations for Lithotomy".

In 1891, he was honored as a C.I.E, Companion of the Most Prominent Order of the Indian Empire. This award was part of the New Year Honours, which were appointments by Queen Victoria highlighting the good works of British citizens. The armorial bearings he was granted consisted of a crest displaying an eagle with the Motto "Spectemur agendo," which translates from Latin into "Let us be judged by our acts".
