= Tom Ackerman =

Tom Ackerman may refer to:

- Tom Ackerman (American football) (born 1972), American football center
- Tom Ackerman (basketball), American basketball player and coach
- Tom Ackerman, drummer for the American band Sunday's Best
