= Tom Cotter =

Tom Cotter may refer to:

- Tom Cotter (comedian) (born 1963), American comedian
- Tom Cotter (baseball) (1866–1906), Major League Baseball catcher
