= Tom Hayes (soccer) =

American soccer player

Personal information
- Date of birth: November 20, 1963 (age 62)
- Place of birth: St. Louis, Missouri, U.S.
- Position: Forward

Youth career
- 1982–1985: St. Louis Billikens

Senior career*
Years	Team	Apps	(Gls)
1985–1987	Louisville Thunder (indoor)		
1987–1988	Los Angeles Lazers (indoor)	23	(5)
- * Club domestic league appearances and goals

Tom Hayes is an American retired soccer forward who played professionally in the Major Indoor Soccer League and American Indoor Soccer Association.

Hayes graduated from Thomas Aquinas High School in St. Louis, Missouri. He attended St. Louis University, playing on the men's soccer team from 1982 to 1985. In 1985, Hayes turned professional with the Louisville Thunder of the American Indoor Soccer Association. The Thunder won the 1987 AISA championship, then folded soon after. Head coach Keith Tozer moved to the Los Angeles Lazers where he brought in Hayes and several ex-Thunder players. On September 30, 1987, Hayes signed with the Los Angeles Lazers of MISL. He retired at the end of the season.
