= Tom Daly =

Tom Daly may refer to:

== Politicians ==
- Tom Daly (American politician) (born 1954), American politician in California
- Tom Daly (Irish politician) (born 1938), Irish nationalist politician

== Sport ==
- Tom Daly (basketball) (born 1991), Australian basketball player
- Tom Daly (catcher) (1891–1946), American baseball catcher for the Chicago White Sox, Cleveland Indians, and Chicago Cubs, and Boston Red Sox coach, 1933–1946
- Tom Daly (infielder) (1866–1938), American baseball second baseman for the Chicago Cubs, Washington Nationals, Brooklyn Dodgers, Chicago White Sox, and Cincinnati Reds
- Tom Daly (rugby union) (born 1993), Irish rugby player
- Tommy Daly (1894–1936), Irish hurler

== Others ==
- Tom Daly (filmmaker) (1918–2011), Canadian film producer

== See also ==
- Thomas Daly (disambiguation), several people
- Thomas Vose Daily (1927–2017), Catholic bishop
- Tom Daley (disambiguation), several people
