= Maeley Tom =

American politician

Maeley Tom is a retired American politician. She was the first woman and first ethnic minority to be chief administrative officer of the state assembly, as well as the first woman and ethnic minority to serve as chief of staff to the president of the state senate.

== Early life ==
Tom's mother and father were Chinese opera singers who were unable to raise her. She spent her early years living with a French Basque woman in Richmond District, San Francisco. At the age of 10, Tom re-joined her mother in Oakland's Chinatown.

Tom graduated from Oakland Tech High School at age 16. She acquired a job and paid her way through college at San Francisco State. Tom graduated from San Francisco State with a degree in Sociology/Psychology.

== Career ==
Tom served as the chief administrative officer of the California Assembly under Speaker Willie Brown Jr. and was subsequently appointed as the Chief of Staff to the California Senate President Pro Tem David Roberti. She was the first woman and first ethnic minority to hold either position.

In the 1980s Tom was the first director of California's Office of Asian Affairs. She organized the first national Asian American Democratic Conference in 1987.

During the campaign finance scandal of 1996, when the Chinese government allegedly tried to influence American politics, Tom experienced prejudice and discrimination from the national media. Tom stated that "I made mistakes, I wasn’t treated well, but I don’t want to be thought of as a victim". Tom was quoted as elaborating that "It was important to me that people tend to see all the successes (as well as) what the person had to go through to reach that pinnacle of achievement".

== Current day ==
Currently retired, Tom continues her work in advancing civil rights issues and helping Asian Americans in politics, specifically attempting to boost Asian-American representation within United States legislature. Tom has published a personal memoir titled "I’m Not Who You Think I Am".
