= Tom Kennedy (Australian footballer) =

Australian rules footballer

Personal information
- Full name: Thomas Morris Kennedy
- Born: 7 July 1906; Carlton North, Victoria
- Died: 11 May 1968 (aged 61); Doncaster, Victoria

Playing career^{1}
Years	Club	Games (Goals)
1927	Carlton	1 (0)
- ^{1} Playing statistics correct to the end of 1927.

Thomas Morris Kennedy (7 July 1906 – 11 May 1968) was an Australian rules footballer who played with Carlton in the Victorian Football League (VFL).

== Family ==
The son of Tristam Charles Kennedy (1857–1916) and Daisy Mary Kennedy (1881–1948), née Morris, Thomas Morris Kennedy was born at Carlton North, Victoria on 7 July 1906.

He married Enid Ruby Mavis Tippett (1912–1999) in 1933.

== Football ==
Kennedy was a follower-forward from Chelsea who played one game for Carlton in Round 1 of the 1927 season, playing in a forward pocket when Carlton met South Melbourne at Princes Park.

Kennedy was granted a permit to Brunswick in June 1927, and subsequently played 18 games for them. During the 1928 season he was granted a clearance to Fitzroy, but he never played a senior game for them.

== War service ==
Kennedy served with Australia’s Volunteer Defence Force during World War II.

== Death ==
Tom Kennedy died on 11 May 1968.
