= Tom Crean =

Tom or Thomas Crean may refer to:

- Thomas Crean (1873–1923), Irish rugby union player, British Army soldier and doctor
- Tom Crean (explorer) (1877–1938), Irish seaman and Antarctic explorer
  - RV Tom Crean, a multi-purpose research vessel operated by the Marine Institute of Galway, Ireland
- Tom Crean (basketball) (born 1966), American head college men's basketball coach
