= Tom J. Bartuska =

- Occupations: Architect, educator, author
- Known for: Sustainable design; interdisciplinary architectural education; rural heritage preservation
- Awards: United Nations Habitat II Gold Medal

Academic work
- Institutions: Washington State University

Tom J. Bartuska is an American architect, educator, and author whose work has focused on sustainable theory, design and planning, interdisciplinary architectural education, and the preservation of rural heritage. He is Professor Emeritus of Architecture at Washington State University (WSU), where he taught for four decades and developed an interdisciplinary course and research program known as The Built Environment. His work has been recognized internationally, including the United Nations Habitat II Gold Medal for sustainable community design.

== Early life and education ==
Bartuska earned his Bachelor of Architecture and Master of Architecture degrees from the University of Illinois Urbana-Champaign, graduating with honors. He doubled major in design and structural engineering. He also received a scholarship for graduate study and later undertook postgraduate studies in urban planning and new town development at the University of Manchester in the United Kingdom.

== Academic career ==
Bartuska joined the faculty of Washington State University in 1963, teaching in the School of Architecture and Construction Management for forty years until his retirement in 2004. He served as Chair of the Environmental Science and Regional Planning Program from 1973 to 1975.

A major focus of his academic career was the development of the all-university course The Built Environment, which he co-founded and coordinated. With enrollments often exceeding 300 students, it became one of WSU's most comprehensive interdisciplinary teaching efforts.

Bartuska was awarded a Fulbright Fellowship to teach architecture and planning at Kabul University in Afghanistan in 1970.

He retired as professor emeritus in 2004.

== Research and publications ==
Bartuska's scholarship focuses on sustainable community development, regenerative urban design, and the relationship between natural and built environments. He has published widely in books and international journals, emphasizing both theoretical and applied approaches to sustainability.

He co-edited two interdisciplinary volumes: The Built Environment: A Creative Inquiry into Design and Planning (1994) and The Built Environment: A Collaborative Inquiry into Design and Planning (2007). These works integrate perspectives from architecture, planning, and the social sciences.

With Helen Bartuska, he co-authored Washington State's Round Barns: Preserving a Vanishing Rural Heritage (2023), a study of the history, design, and preservation of round barns in Washington and selected sites across the United States. They also contributed entries to the Society of Architectural Historians’ Archipedia, including essays on the Leonard Round Barn and IslandWood.

== Honors and awards ==
In 1996, Bartuska and two of his colleagues (Bashir Kazimee and Michael Owen) at Washington State University received a Gold Medal and Honorary Diploma at the United Nations Habitat II Conference in Istanbul, Turkey, for their proposal "Sustainable Community Development: A Comprehensive Regenerative Proposal for Pullman, Washington.” The project was one of only three internationally recognized entries, alongside Foster + Partners (London) and Mirillo Architects (Argentina).

He received the Outstanding Teaching Award from the WSU School of Architecture in 1990 and the Meritorious Award from the National University Continuing Education Association in 1987 for his contributions to The Built Environment course.

== Selected works ==
- The Built Environment: A Creative Inquiry into Design and Planning. Crisp Publications, 1994. (Co-editor, author of five chapters)
- The Built Environment: A Collaborative Inquiry into Design and Planning. Wiley, 2007. (Co-editor, author of five chapters)
- Washington State's Round Barns: Preserving a Vanishing Rural Heritage. WSU Press, 2023. (Co-author with Helen Bartuska)
- “Cascadia and the Evergreen State.” In Sustainable Urban Forms: Theory, Design and Application. Cognella, 2016.
- “Sustainable Housing and Community Planning.” Coauthored with Bashir Kazimee. In Sustainable Urban Forms: Theory, Design and Application. Cognella, 2016.
- “Sustainable Cells of Urbanism: A Regenerative Theory and Practice.” In Future Forms and Design for Sustainable Cities. Architectural Press, 2005.
- “A Comparative Tale of Two Cities in Search of Sustainability: Seattle and London.” In The Sustainable City, WIT Press, 2002.
- “The Evolution of the Townhouse and Its Role in Creating Sustainable Communities.” International Journal of Design, Nature and Ecodynamics, WIT Press, 2013.
