= Tom Re =

Australian rules footballer, born 1913

Personal information
- Full name: Thomas Joseph Re
- Born: 3 February 1913; Melbourne, Victoria
- Died: 5 February 1996 (aged 83)
- Original team: St Ignatius
- Height: 178 cm (5 ft 10 in)
- Weight: 73 kg (161 lb)

Playing career^{1}
Years	Club	Games (Goals)
1936–37	Fitzroy	3 (0)
1937–41	Coburg (VFA)	83 (1)
- ^{1} Playing statistics correct to the end of 1937.

Thomas Joseph Re (3 February 1913 – 5 February 1996) was a former Australian rules footballer who played with Fitzroy in the Victorian Football League (VFL).

Re later served in the Australian Army during World War II.
