= Tommy Brown (footballer, born 1897) =

English footballer

Personal information
- Date of birth: 27 March 1897
- Place of birth: Sheffield, West Riding of Yorkshire, England
- Position: Half-back

Senior career*
Years	Team	Apps	(Gls)
1919–	Bradford Park Avenue	19	(0)
- Rotherham Town
Total		19	(0)
- * Club domestic league appearances and goals

Thomas E. Brown (27 March 1897 – ?) was an English professional footballer who played as a half-back in the Football League for Bradford Park Avenue and in non-League football for Rotherham Town.
