= Tom LeDuc =

American actor and model (1957–1989)

- Born: August 21, 1957; Philadelphia, Pennsylvania, U.S.
- Died: October 4, 1989 (aged 32); Los Angeles, California, U.S.
- Other names: Tommy LeDuc; Tom Le Duc; Kim LaTue
- Occupations: Actor; model; bodybuilder
- Years active: 1978–1989
- Agent: Fox Studio

Tom LeDuc (August 21, 1957 – October 4, 1989) was an American adult film actor, model, and bodybuilder who used aliases including Tommy LeDuc and Kim LaRue. During the 1980s, he emerged as a prominent figure in gay adult media, helping popularize the "muscle" and "leather" aesthetics.

== Early life and military service ==
He was born in Philadelphia, Pennsylvania, LeDuc served in the United States Marine Corps. He was noted that his military background helped shape the disciplined physique and rugged public persona he carried into his modeling and film work.

== Career ==
After leaving the military, LeDuc transitioned into competitive bodybuilding and fitness modeling, beginning his work with Fox Studio in 1978. He was featured in various physical culture and adult publications—including The Fox, Mandate, and In Touch—becoming a recognized archetype within the "Golden Age" of gay adult cinema.

== Death ==
LeDuc died from AIDS-related complications on October 4, 1989, in Los Angeles, California, at age 32.

== Filmography ==
=== Film ===
| Year | Title | Role | Notes |
|---|---|---|---|
| 1980 | School Daze | College Jock | Debut |
| 1981 | Muscle Up" & "Leather Bond | Tom | |
| 1981 | Muscle Up (Fox) | Tom | |
| 1984 | Muscle Up | Tommy | |
| 1985 | Fox Hunt 4 | Tom | |
| 1986 | Hard To Come By | Handsome Bodybuilder | |
| 1987 | All Muscle 2 | Tom | |
| 1988 | Intruders | Tom | |
