= Tom Brown (rugby, born 1983) =

Wales international rugby league & union footballer

Personal information
- Full name: Thomas Brown
- Born: 20 May 1983 (age 42) Doncaster, England

Playing information
- Height: 1.88 m (6 ft 2 in)
- Weight: 110 kg (17 st 5 lb)

Rugby league
- Position: Second-row
Club
| Years | Team | Pld | T | G | FG | P |
|---|---|---|---|---|---|---|
| 2004 | Gloucestershire Warriors |
Representative
| Years | Team | Pld | T | G | FG | P |
| 2004 | Wales | 1 | | | | (0) |

Rugby union
- Position: Number Eight
Club
| Years | Team | Pld | T | G | FG | P |
|---|---|---|---|---|---|---|
| 2004 | Coventry R.F.C. |
| | Worcester Warriors |
| | Newbury R.F.C. |
| 2010 | London Welsh RFC |
| 2010 | Cardiff Blues |
| 2011–2013 | NG Dragons | 33 | 1 | 0 | 0 | 5 |
| 2013 | Jersey | 0 | 0 | 0 | 0 | 0 |
| | Total | 33 | 1 | 0 | 0 | 5 |
Representative
| Years | Team | Pld | T | G | FG | P |
| 2004 | Wales U-21s |

Thomas Brown is an English former professional rugby union and rugby league footballer who played in the 2000s and 2010s, and has coached rugby union in the 2010s. He has played representative level rugby union (RU) for Wales (Under-21s), and at club level for Coventry R.F.C., Worcester Warriors, Newbury RFC, London Welsh, Cardiff Blues, Newport Gwent Dragons and Jersey as a number eight, and representative level rugby league (RL) for Wales, and at club level for Gloucestershire Warriors, as a second-row.

== International honours ==
Brown won a cap for Wales (RL) while at Coventry R.F.C. (RU) in 2004.

== Outside of rugby ==
Brown also appeared on ITV's dating game show Take Me Out.
