= Lockheed AQM-60 Kingfisher =

Type of aircraft

AQM-60 Kingfisher
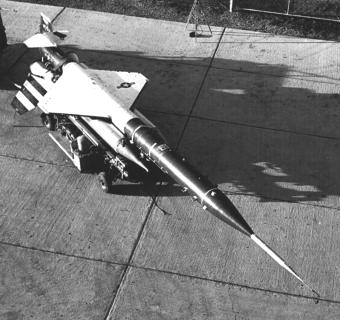
- AQM-60 Kingfisher awaiting loading onto its B-50 mothership before a test of US air defenses.

General information
- Type: Target drone
- National origin: United States of America
- Manufacturer: Lockheed
- Primary user: United States Air Force

History
- First flight: April 1951
- Developed from: Lockheed X-7

The AQM-60 Kingfisher, originally designated XQ-5, was a target drone version of the USAF's X-7 ramjet test aircraft built by the Lockheed Corporation. The aircraft was designed by Kelly Johnson, who later created the Lockheed A-12 and its relatives, such as the Lockheed SR-71 Blackbird and Lockheed YF-12.

The X-7's development began in 1946 after a request from the USAF for a Mach 3 unmanned aerial vehicle for test purposes. This craft evolved into the Kingfisher, which was later used to test anti-missile systems such as the MIM-3 Nike Ajax, SAM-A-25/MIM-14 Nike Hercules, and IM-99/CIM-10.

The Kingfisher was capable of evading the vast majority of weapons systems it was used to test, despite the systems being designed to destroy hypersonic missiles in flight. This created much embarrassment at the USAF and considerable political fallout. This led to the discontinuation of production in 1959 and the cancellation of the project in the mid-1960s.

The engine developed for the AQM-60 was later modified for use on the long range nuclear armed CIM-10 Bomarc, which was a nationwide defense against nuclear bombers during the 1960s and early 1970s. An endurance variant of the same engine was produced for use in the Lockheed D-21, which was launched from the back of a Lockheed SR-71 Blackbird mothership or from under the wing of a Boeing B-52 Stratofortress nuclear bomber.

== Specifications ==
General characteristics

- Length: 38 ft 1 in (11.6 m)
- Wingspan: 9 ft 10 in (3 m)
- Height: 6 ft 11 in (2.1 m)
- Gross weight: 7,937 lb (3,600 kg)
- Powerplant: 1 × Marquardt XRJ43-MA ramjet (Sustainer)
- Powerplant: 2 × Thiokol XM45 (5KS50000) solid-fuel rockets, 50,000 lbf (222 kN) thrust each for 5s (Boosters)

Performance

- Maximum speed: Mach 4.3
- Range: 110 nmi (130 mi, 210 km)
- Service ceiling: 98,000 ft (30,000 m)
