= Lockheed X-7 =

Experimental aircraft to test ramjet engines and missile guidance technology

X-7
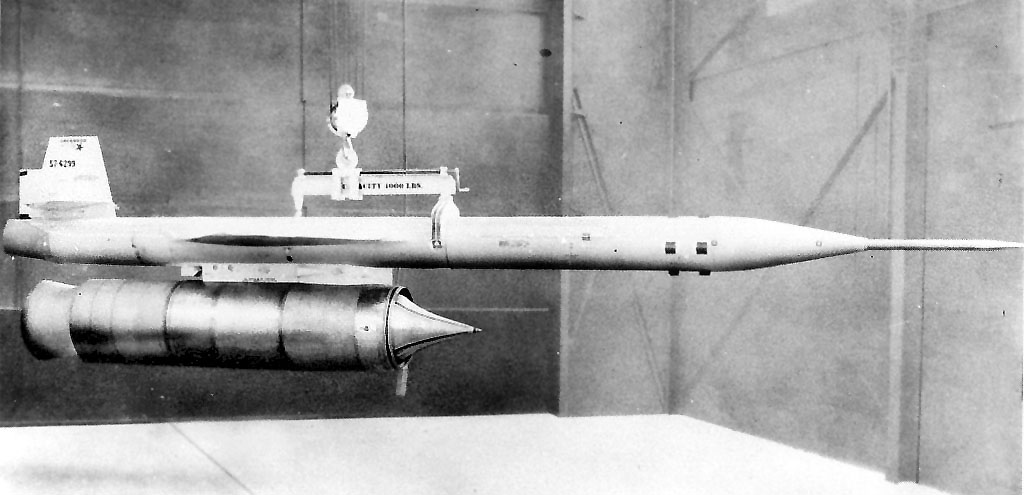

General information
- Type: Experimental aircraft
- Manufacturer: Lockheed Corporation
- Primary user: United States Air Force

History
- First flight: April 26, 1951
- Retired: 1960
- Developed into: AQM-60 Kingfisher

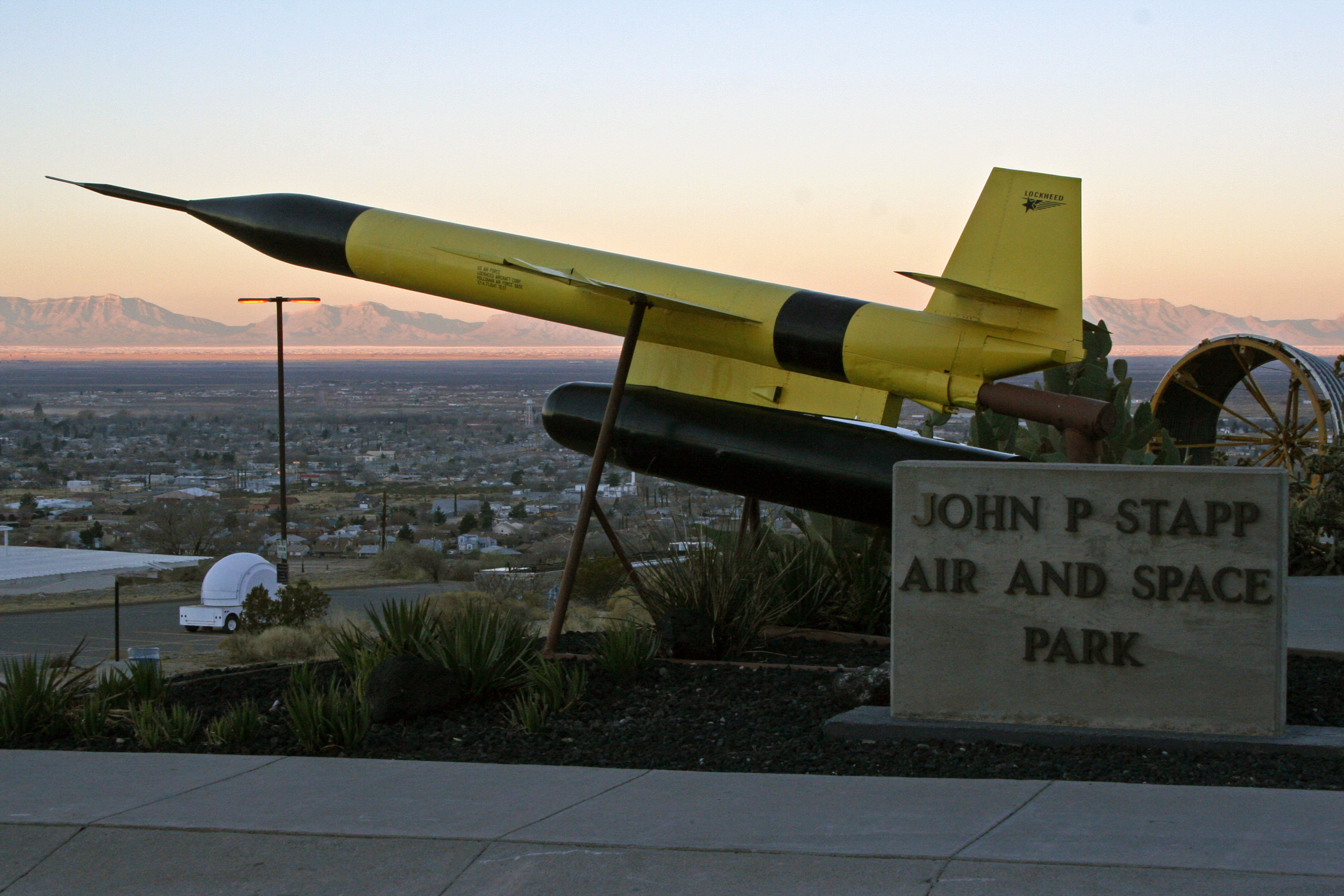
A Lockheed X-7 on public display in New Mexico

The Lockheed X-7 (dubbed the "Flying Stove Pipe") is an American unmanned test bed of the 1950s for ramjet engines and missile guidance technology. It was the basis for the later Lockheed AQM-60 Kingfisher, a system used to test American air defenses against nuclear missile attack.

== Early development ==
Development of the Kingfisher was first initiated in December 1946. The X-7 was called into production by the United States Air Force requirement for the development of an unmanned ramjet test plane with a top speed of at least Mach 3 (3,200 km/h; 2,000 mph).

The X-7 project was developed under the AMC designator MX-883 and was given in the Lockheed in-house designation L-171. The L-171 was initially designated the PTV-A-1 by the USAF but was later designated the X-7 in 1951. Despite its first launch being a failure, after re-development of the original ramjet, following test flights were successful. A total of 130 X-7 flights were conducted from April 1951 to July 1960.

== Purpose ==
The X-7 laid the foundation for the AQM-60 Kingfisher. Being the testbed for several yearlong projects, the X-7 underwent many structural changes to adapt more closely for its intended purpose. The Kingfisher was put up against three surface to air missiles designed to test the capabilities of the X-7; SAM-A-7/MIM-3 Nike Ajax, SAM-A-25/MIM-14 Nike Hercules, and IM-99/CIM-10 Bomarc were the missiles used in the tests. During the testing of the SAMs, the X-7 outperformed the missiles and a very small number of critical hits were achieved. Due to pressure and embarrassment of the military, the X-7 project was terminated in the mid-1960s.

Besides the surface to air missile tests, the X-7 project was also used to test communication equipment for acceleration tests, testing aerodynamics, booster propellants, thermodynamics, and parachutes.

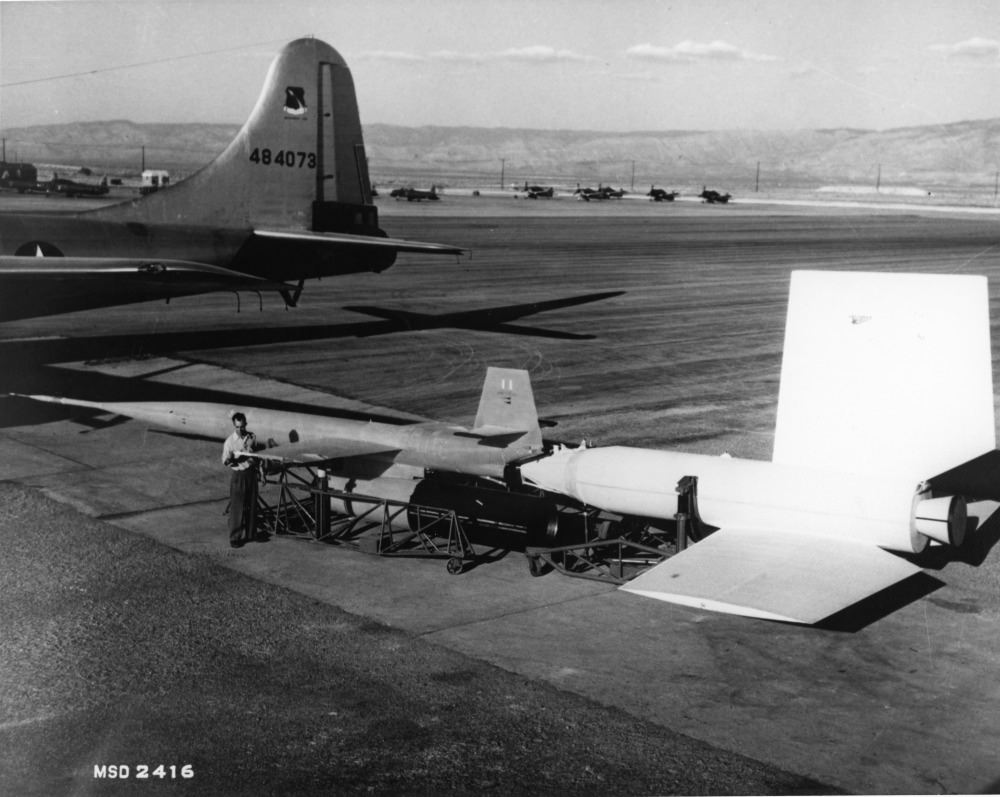
Lockheed X-7A-1 being prepared for loading and test flight. The white section is the booster. (B-50 seen in background)

== Construction ==
The X-7 was constructed from steel, unlike its successors such as the A-12 and YF-12 which used titanium. These X-7 planes had wings constructed from stainless steel and a fuselage made from a nickel alloy. The use of steel was due to the inability of aluminum to endure air friction heating at hypersonic speeds, years before the widespread introduction of titanium.

The engines developed for the X-7/AQM-60 were designed to operate for a short time, to test the design for the CIM-10 Bomarc. They were redesigned with better materials for use on the hypersonic Lockheed D-21 drone launched from the back of a Lockheed M-21, a derivative of the Lockheed A-12, or from under the wing of a Boeing B-52 Stratofortress.

== Launch and recovery ==
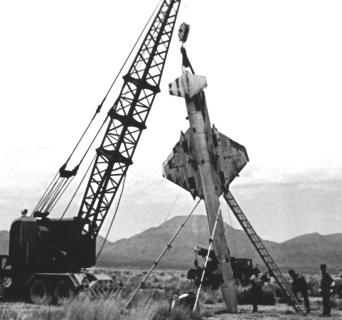
Lockheed X-7 buried nose down in the desert

The X-7 was launched at speed release from the underside of either a B-29 or B-50 carrier plane. The jet would then take over and build up speed to its top speed of 1,600 km/h (1,000 mph), but was later redesigned to push Mach 4.3 (4,680 km/h; 2,910 mph).

The recovery method of the X-7 rocket plane was a new and simple design for a test plane of its kind but functioned as designed. A multi-stage parachute was deployed after the jet had exhausted its fuel, slowing its descent. Once it had reached the ground, the long metal rod on the end of the nose penetrated the ground, keeping the plane upright and preventing damage to the structure of the X-7.

In 1954, the modified X-7 underwent significant changes and was renamed the X-7A-3. The wing shape was altered, and two small boosters were added to the plane, one under each wing. Due to these alterations, the drop method previously used was changed. The previous version was a complicated, bulky under-wing system, while the new design allowed for a simple fuselage-mounted dropping system. This system was used until its final flight in July 1960.

== Surviving aircraft ==
- X-7 on display at the Aviation Unmanned Vehicle Museum in Caddo Mills, Texas.

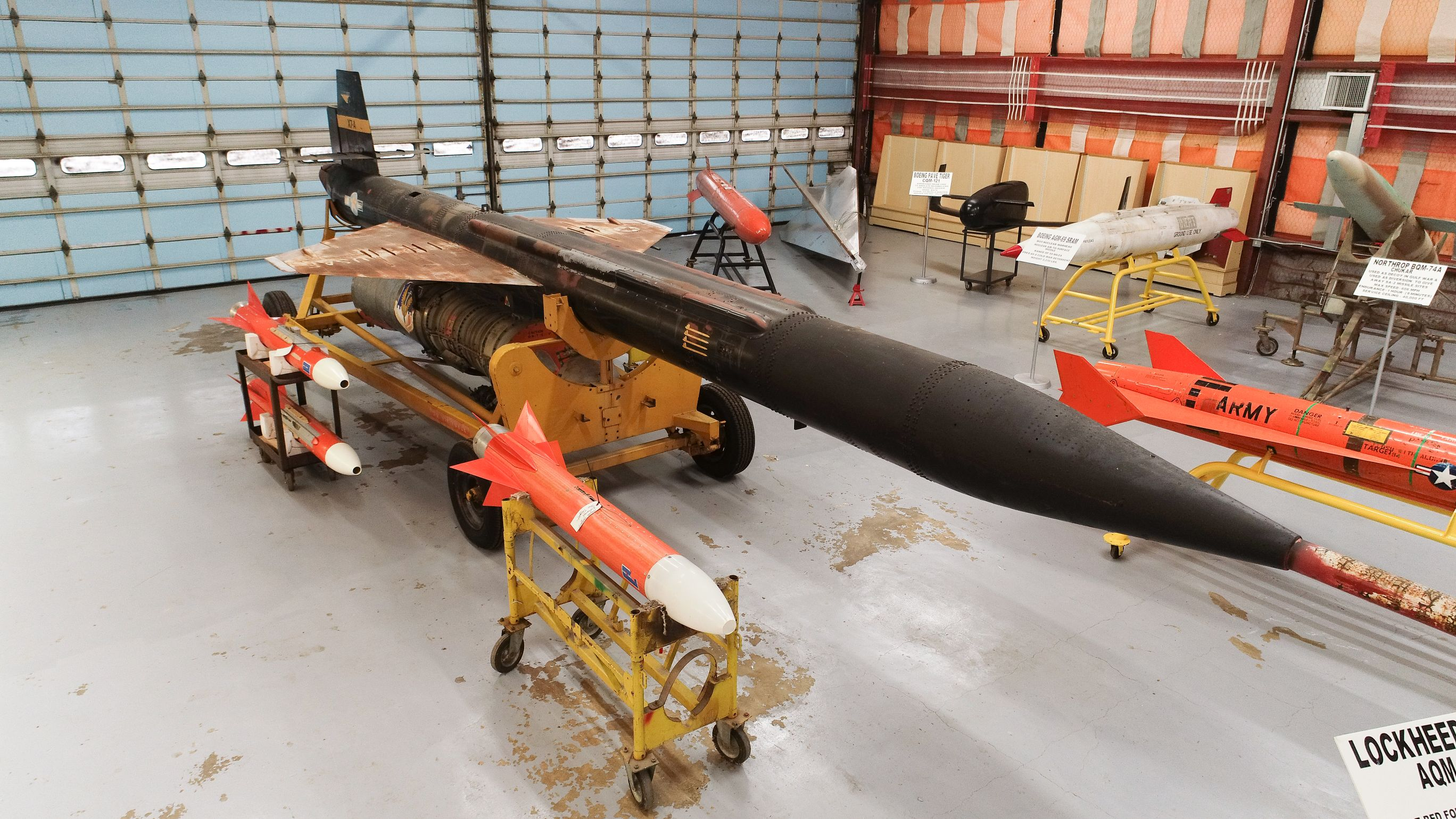
X-7A on display at the Aviation Unmanned Vehicle Museum

== Specifications of X-7A-1 ==
- Length: 9.98 m (32 ft 9 in)
- Wingspan: 3.7 m (12 ft)
- Height: 2.1 m (7 ft)
- Diameter: 510 mm (20 in)
- Weight: 3,600 kg (8,000 lb)
- Speed: 4,500 km/h (2,800 mph) (Maximum speed: Mach 4.31 (4,710 km/h; 2,927 mph))
- Ceiling: 32,000 m (106,000 ft)
- Range: 210 km (130 mi)
- Booster: Alleghany Ballistics Lab. X202-C3 solid- fuel rocket; 467 kN for 4 seconds.
- Sustainer: Ramjet

== Specifications of X-7A-3 ==
- Length: 11 m (37 ft)
- Wingspan: 3.0 m (10 ft)
- Height: 2.1 m (7 ft)
- Diameter: 510 mm (20 in)
- Weight: 3,600 kg (8,000 lb)
- Speed: 4,500 km/h (2,800 mph)
- Ceiling: 32,000 m (106,000 ft)
- Range: 210 km (130 mi)
- Booster: X-7A-3/XQ-5: 2 × Thiokol XM45 (5KS50000) solid-fuel rocket; 222 kN (50000 lb)
- Sustainer: Ramjet

== See also ==
Related development

- Q-5 Kingfisher (based on the X-7 A-3)

Aircraft of comparable role, configuration, and era

- Bomarc

Related lists

- List of X-planes
