= Albert Fonó =

Hungarian mechanical engineer

Albert Fonó (born 2 July 1881 in Budapest, d. 21 November 1972 in Budapest), a Hungarian mechanical engineer who was one of the early pioneers of ramjet propulsion.

Fonó graduated from the József Technical University in Budapest in 1903 and travelled widely, gaining experience working for German, Belgian, French and Swiss manufacturers, before attaining his Ph.D.

His main specialty was energetics. He had 46 patents in 20 topics of research, including a steam boiler and an air compressor for mines. In 1915 he devised a solution for increasing the range of artillery, comprising a gun-launched projectile combined with a ramjet propulsion unit. This was to make it possible to obtain a long range with low initial muzzle velocities, allowing heavy shells to be fired from relatively lightweight guns. Fonó submitted his invention to the Austro-Hungarian Army but the proposal was rejected. He summarised the essence of his innovation for the military officers: "The projectile stores chemical energy in the fuel it carries, instead of simple kinetic energy. On the way, the fuel is burned by the air flowing against it, the heat generated being converted into work, overcoming the air resistance. This not only overcomes the resistance but also allows the flying projectile to accelerate during the flight. It becomes possible to achieve a long range at a relatively low initial velocity and a high impact energy at the point of impact."

After World War I Fonó returned to the subject of jet propulsion, in May 1928 describing an "air-jet engine" (now called a ramjet) which he described as being suitable for high-altitude supersonic aircraft, in a German patent application. In an additional patent application he adapted the engine for subsonic speed. The patent was finally granted in 1932 after four years of examination (German Patent No. 554,906, 1932-11-02).

From 1954 he was a corresponding member of the Hungarian Academy of Sciences and received the Hungarian Kossuth Prize in 1956 (awarded for outstanding merit in the cultural and artistic fields). In 1968 he became a corresponding member of the International Academy of Astronautics.

He is remembered by the Albert Fonó Award, which is awarded by the Hungarian Astronautical Society.
