= Marquardt RJ43 =

Ramjet engine

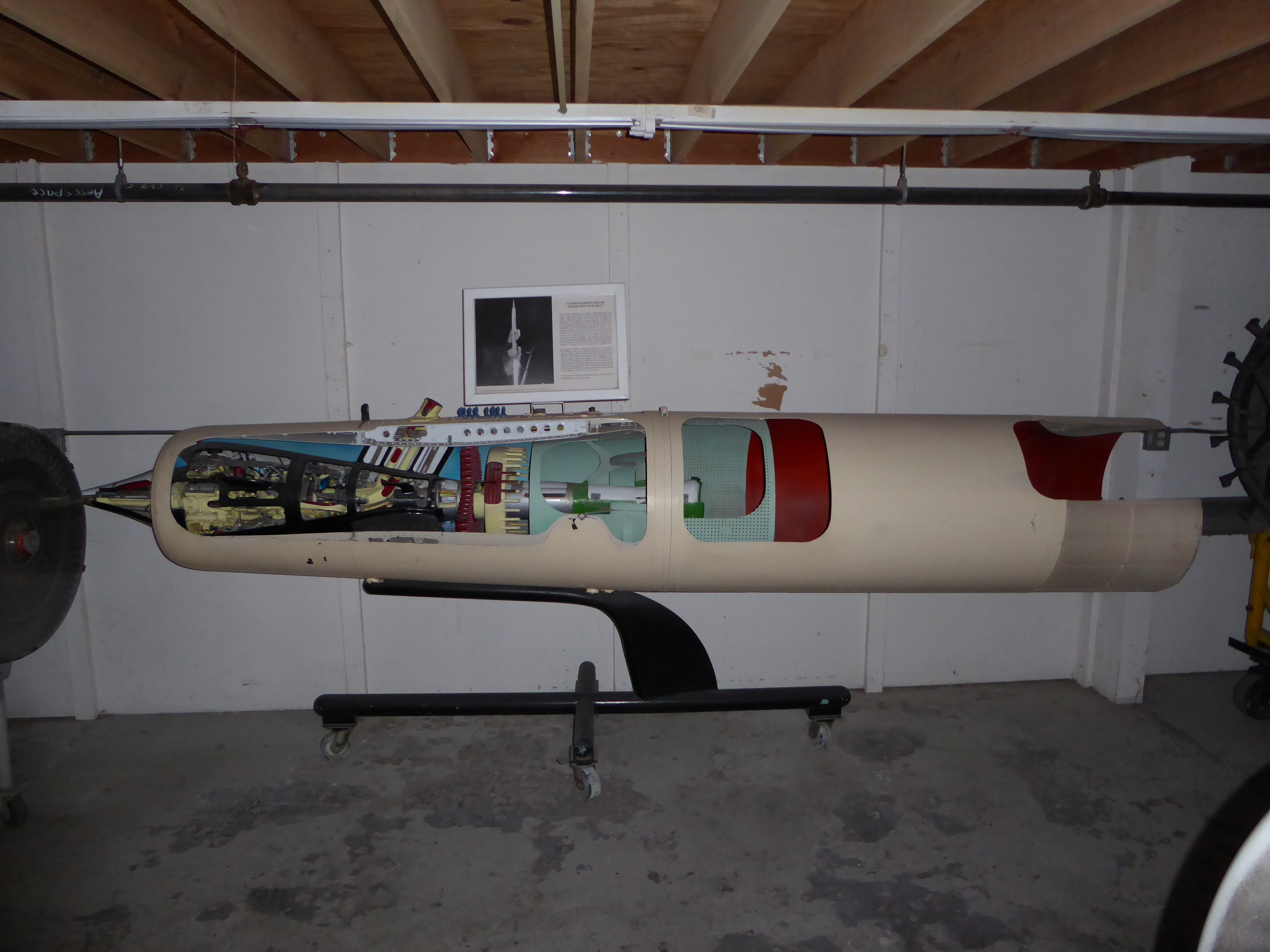
A sectioned RJ43-9 from a Bomarc missile at the San Diego Air & Space Museum annex Gillespie Field

The Marquardt RJ43 was a ramjet engine used on the CIM-10 Bomarc missile, the D-21 drone, and the AQM-60 drone. They were engineered and built by the Marquardt Corporation.

== Variants ==
- RJ43-MA-3 ramjet; 51 kN (11500 lb)
- RJ43-7 ramjet; 53 kN (12000 lb)
- RJ43-11 ramjet; 53 kN (12000 lb)
- RJ43-20S4 ramjet; 7.3 kN (1,500 lb @ 95,000 ft.)

== Applications ==
- CIM-10 Bomarc
- Lockheed D-21
- Lockheed AQM-60 Kingfisher
