= Ramjet =

Supersonic atmospheric jet engine

Simple ramjet operation, with Mach numbers of flow shown

A ramjet is a form of airbreathing jet engine that requires forward motion of the engine to provide air for combustion. Ramjets work most efficiently at supersonic speeds around Mach 3 (2,300 mph; 3,700 km/h) and can operate up to Mach 6 (4,600 mph; 7,400 km/h).

Ramjets can be particularly appropriate in uses requiring a compact mechanism for high speed, such as missiles. Weapons designers are investigating ramjet technology for use in artillery shells to increase range; a 120 mm ramjet-assisted mortar shell is thought to be able to travel 35 km (22 mi). They have been used, though not efficiently, as tip jets on the ends of helicopter rotors.

== History ==
=== France ===
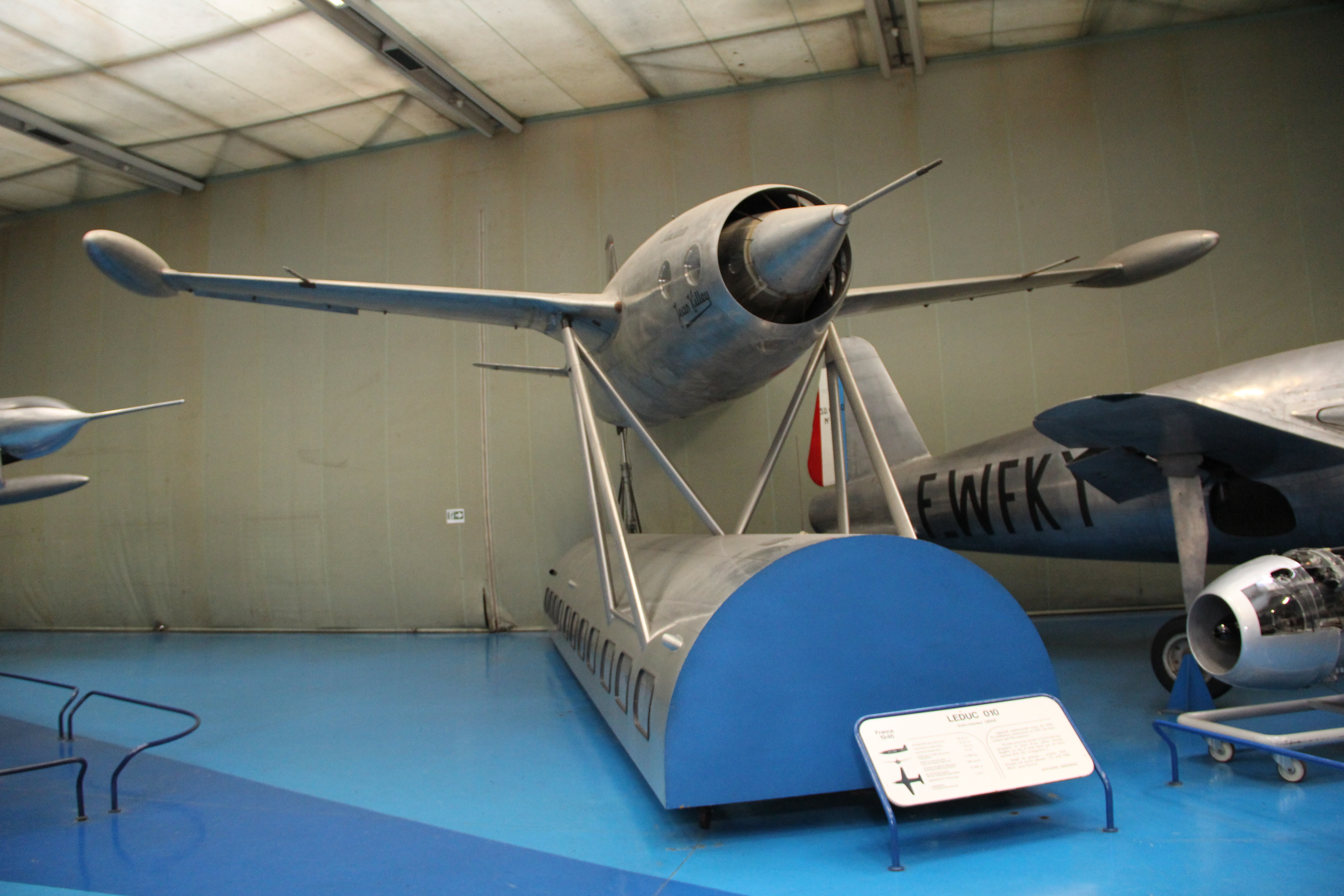
Leduc 010

==== Cyrano de Bergerac ====
L'Autre Monde: ou les États et Empires de la Lune (Comical History of the States and Empires of the Moon) (1657) was the first of three satirical novels written by Cyrano de Bergerac that are considered among the first science fiction stories. Arthur C Clarke credited this book with conceiving the ramjet, and as the first fictional example of rocket-powered space flight.

==== René Lorin ====
The ramjet was designed in 1913 by French inventor René Lorin, who was granted a patent (FR290356) for his device. He could not test his invention due to the unavailability of adequate equipment since there was no way at the time for an aircraft to go fast enough for a ramjet to function properly. His patent showed a piston internal combustion engine with added 'trumpets' as exhaust nozzles, expressing the idea that the exhaust from internal combustion engines could be directed into nozzles to create jet propulsion.

==== René Leduc ====
The works of René Leduc were notable. Leduc's Model, the Leduc 0.10 was one of the first ramjet-powered aircraft to fly, in 1949.

==== Nord Aviation ====
The Nord 1500 Griffon reached Mach 2.19 (745 m/s; 2,680 km/h) in 1958.

=== Austria-Hungary ===
==== Albert Fonó ====
In 1915, Hungarian inventor Albert Fonó devised a solution for increasing the range of artillery, comprising a gun-launched projectile united with a ramjet propulsion unit, thus giving a long range from relatively low muzzle velocities, allowing heavy shells to be fired from relatively lightweight guns. Fonó submitted his invention to the Austro-Hungarian Army, but the proposal was rejected. After World War I, Fonó returned to the subject. In May 1928 he described an "air-jet engine" as suitable for high-altitude supersonic aircraft, in a German patent application. In an additional patent application, he adapted the engine for subsonic speed. The patent was granted in 1932 (German Patent No. 554,906, 1932-11-02).

=== Soviet Union ===
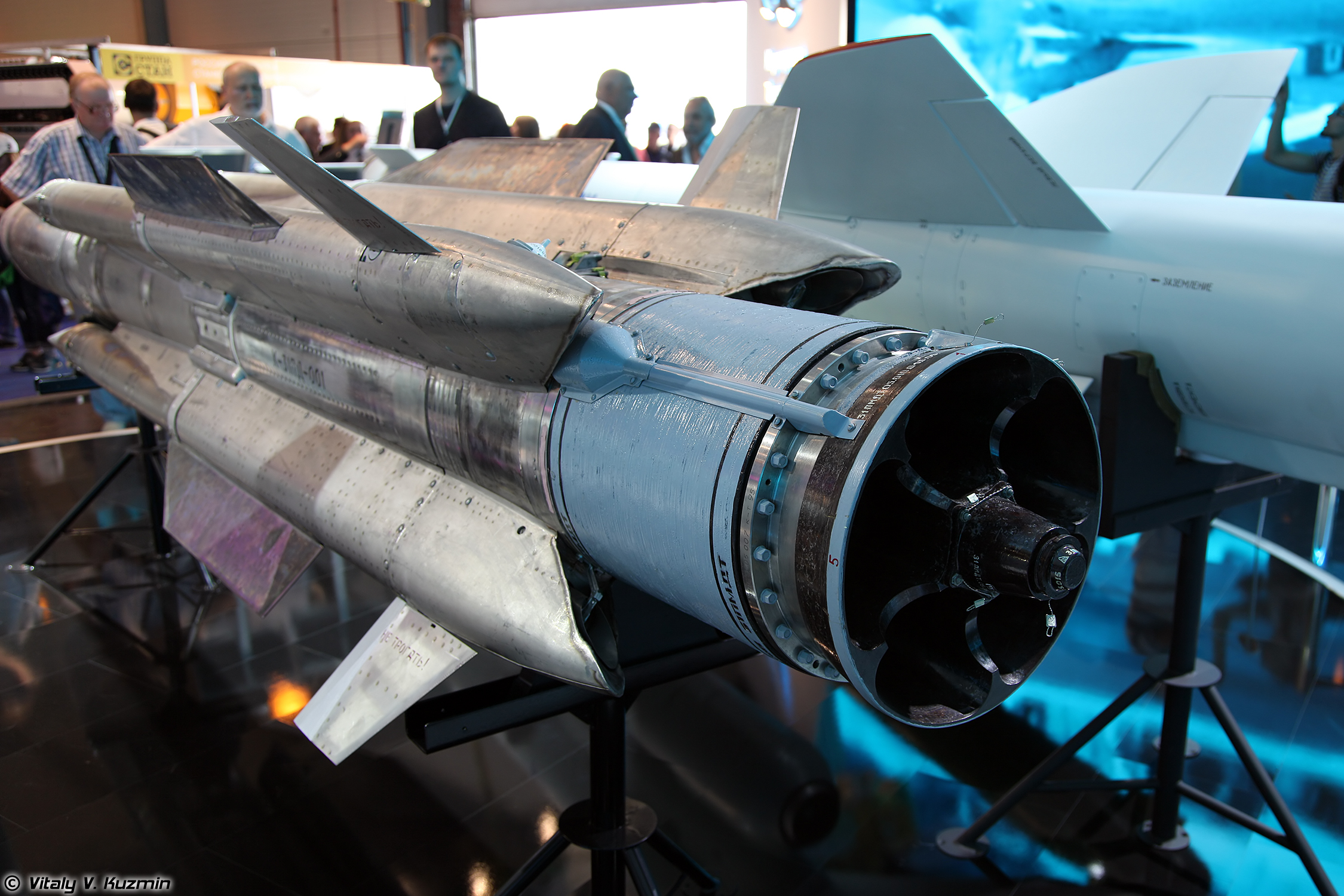
Kh-31 missile ramjet exhaust

In the Soviet Union, a theory of supersonic ramjet engines was presented in 1928 by Boris Stechkin. Yuri Pobedonostsev, chief of GIRD's 3rd Brigade, carried out research. The first engine, the GIRD-04, was designed by I.A. Merkulov and tested in April 1933. To simulate supersonic flight, it was fed by air compressed to 200 bar, and was fueled with hydrogen. The GIRD-08 phosphorus-fueled ramjet was tested by firing it from an artillery cannon. These shells may have been the first jet-powered projectiles to break the speed of sound.

In 1939, Merkulov did further ramjet tests using a two-stage rocket, the R-3. He developed the first ramjet engine for use as an auxiliary motor of an aircraft, the DM-1. The world's first ramjet-powered airplane flight took place in December 1940, using two DM-2 engines on a modified Polikarpov I-15. Merkulov designed a ramjet fighter "Samolet D" in 1941, which was never completed. Two of his DM-4 engines were installed on the Yak-7 PVRD fighter during World War II. In 1940, the Kostikov-302 experimental plane was designed, powered by a liquid fuel rocket for take-off and ramjet engines for flight. That project was cancelled in 1944.

In 1947, Mstislav Keldysh proposed a long-range antipodal bomber, similar to the Sänger-Bredt bomber, but powered by ramjet instead of rocket. In 1954, NPO Lavochkin and the Keldysh Institute began development of a Mach 3 ramjet-powered cruise missile, Burya. This project competed with the R-7 ICBM developed by Sergei Korolev, but was cancelled in 1957.

=== Japan ===
Several ramjets were designed, built, and ground-tested at the Kawasaki Aircraft Company's facility in Gifu during the Second World War. Company officials claimed, in December 1945, that these domestic initiatives were uninfluenced by parallel German developments. One post-war U.S. intelligence assessment described the Kawasaki ramjet's centrifugal fuel disperser as the company's "most outstanding accomplishment ... eliminat[ing] a large amount of the fuel injection system normally employed." Because of excessive vibration, the engine was only intended for use in rocket, or catapult-launched pilotless aircraft. Preparations for flight testing ended with the Japanese surrender in August 1945.

=== Germany ===
In 1936, Hellmuth Walter constructed a test engine powered by natural gas. Theoretical work was carried out at BMW, Junkers, and DFL. In 1941, Eugen Sänger of DFL proposed a ramjet engine with a high combustion chamber temperature. He constructed large ramjet pipes with 500 millimetres (20 in) and 1,000 millimetres (39 in) diameter and carried out combustion tests on lorries and on a special test rig on a Dornier Do 17Z at flight speeds of up to 200 metres per second (720 km/h). Later, as petrol became scarce in Germany, tests were carried out with blocks of pressed coal dust as a fuel (see e.g. Lippisch P.13a), which were not successful due to slow combustion.

=== United States ===
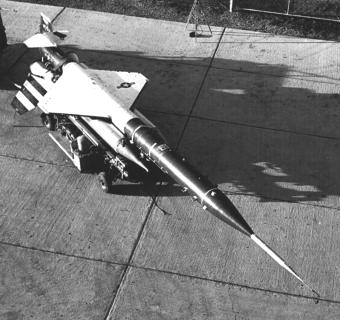
An AQM-60 Kingfisher, the first production ramjet to enter service with the US military

Stovepipe (flying/flaming/supersonic) was a popular name for the ramjet during the 1950s in trade magazines such as Aviation Week & Space Technology and other publications such as The Cornell Engineer. The simplicity implied by the name came from a comparison with the turbojet engine which employs relatively complex and expensive spinning turbomachinery.

The US Navy developed a series of air-to-air missiles under the name of "Gorgon" using different propulsion mechanisms, including ramjet propulsion on the Gorgon IV. The ramjet Gorgon IVs, made by Glenn Martin, were tested in 1948 and 1949 at Naval Air Station Point Mugu. The ramjet was designed at the University of Southern California and manufactured by the Marquardt Aircraft Company. The engine was 2.1 metres (7 ft) long and 510 millimetres (20 in) in diameter and was positioned below the missile.

In the early 1950s the US developed a Mach 4+ ramjet under the Lockheed X-7 program. This was developed into the Lockheed AQM-60 Kingfisher. Further development resulted in the Lockheed D-21 spy drone.

In the late 1950s the US Navy introduced a system called the RIM-8 Talos, which was a long range surface-to-air missile fired from ships. It successfully shot down enemy fighters during the Vietnam War, and was the first ship-launched missile to destroy an enemy aircraft in combat. On 23 May 1968, a Talos fired from USS Long Beach shot down a Vietnamese MiG at a range of about 105 kilometres (65 miles). It was also used as a surface-to-surface weapon and was modified to destroy land-based radars.

Using technology proven by the AQM-60, In the late 1950s and early 1960s the US produced a widespread defense system called the CIM-10 Bomarc, which was equipped with hundreds of nuclear armed ramjet missiles with a range of several hundred miles. It was powered by the same engines as the AQM-60, but with improved materials to endure longer flight times. The system was withdrawn in the 1970s as the threat from bombers subsided.

==== THOR-ER ====
In April 2020, the U.S. Department of Defense and the Norwegian Ministry of Defense jointly announced their partnership to develop advanced technologies applicable to long range high-speed and hypersonic weapons. The Tactical High-speed Offensive Ramjet for Extended Range (THOR-ER) program completed a solid fuel ramjet (SFRJ) vehicle test in August 2022.

=== United Kingdom ===
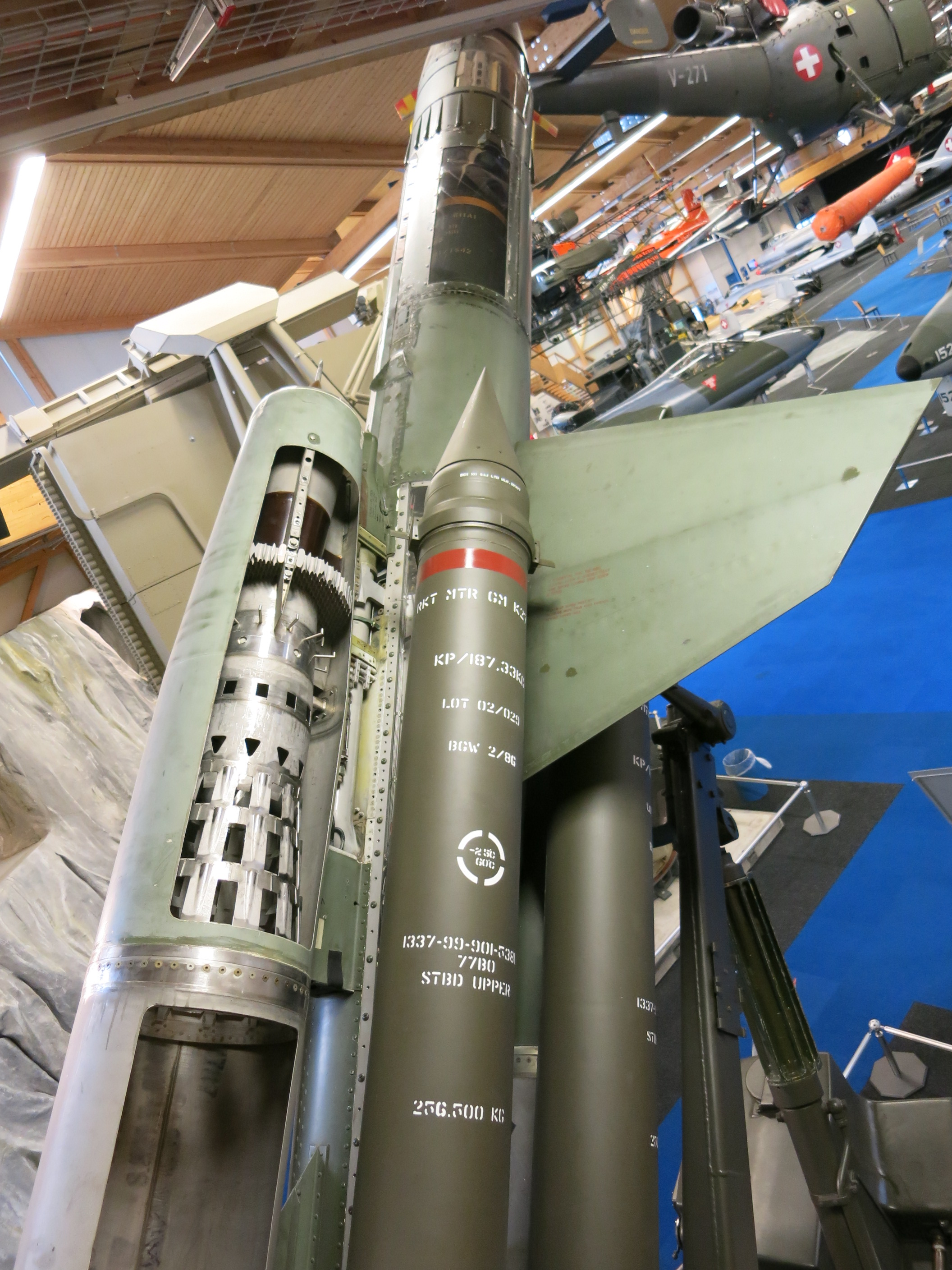
Upper engine is a ramjet on the Bloodhound missile

In the late 1950s, 1960s, and early 1970s, the UK developed several ramjet missiles.

The Blue Envoy project was supposed to equip the country with a long range ramjet powered air defense against bombers, but the system was cancelled. It was replaced by a shorter range ramjet missile system called the Bloodhound. The system was designed as a second line of defense in case attackers were able to bypass the fleet of defending English Electric Lightning fighters.

In the 1960s the Royal Navy developed and deployed a ramjet powered surface to air missile for ships called the Sea Dart. It had a range of 65–130 kilometres (40–80 mi) and a speed of Mach 3. It was used successfully in combat against multiple types of aircraft during the Falklands War.

==== Fritz Zwicky ====
Eminent Swiss astrophysicist Fritz Zwicky was research director at Aerojet and holds many patents in jet propulsion. Patents US 5121670 and US 4722261 are for ram accelerators. The U.S. Navy would not allow Zwicky to publicly discuss his invention, US 2461797 is for the Underwater Jet, a ramjet that performs in a fluid medium. Time magazine reported on Zwicky's work.

== Design ==
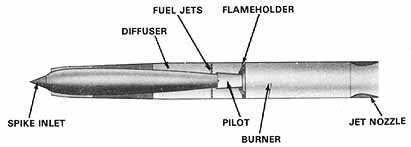
A typical ramjet

The first part of a ramjet is its diffuser (compressor) in which the forward motion of the ramjet is used to raise the pressure of its working fluid (air) as required for combustion. Air is compressed, heated by combustion and expanded in a thermodynamic cycle known as the Brayton cycle, before being passed through a nozzle to accelerate it to supersonic speeds and generate forward thrust.

Ramjets are much less complex than turbojets or turbofans, requiring only an air intake, a combustor, and a nozzle to be built. Additionally, ramjets have little to no moving parts - liquid-fuel ramjets have only a fuel pump, whilst solid-fuel ramjets lack even this.

By comparison, a turbojet uses a compressor driven by a turbine, which generates its own compressed air (i.e. ram air in a ramjet) in order to generate thrust.

== Construction ==
=== Diffuser ===
The diffuser converts the high velocity of the air approaching the intake into high (static) pressure required for combustion. High combustion pressures minimise entropy rise during heat addition, thus minimising wasted thermal energy in the exhaust gases

Subsonic and low-supersonic ramjets use a pitot-type opening for the inlet. This is followed by a widening internal passage (subsonic diffuser) to achieve a lower subsonic velocity that is required at the combustor. At low supersonic speeds a normal (planar) shock wave forms in front of the inlet.

For higher supersonic speeds the pressure loss through the shock wave becomes prohibitive and a protruding spike or cone is used to produce oblique shock waves in front of a final normal shock that occurs at the inlet entrance lip. The diffuser in this case consists of two parts: the supersonic diffuser, with shock waves external to the inlet, followed by the internal subsonic diffuser.

At higher speeds still, part of the supersonic diffusion has to take place internally, requiring external and internal oblique shock waves. The final normal shock has to occur in the vicinity of a minimum flow area known as the throat, which is followed by the subsonic diffuser.

=== Combustor ===
As with other jet engines, the combustor raises the air temperature by burning fuel. This takes place with a small pressure loss. The air velocity entering the combustor has to be low enough such that continuous combustion can take place in sheltered zones provided by flame holders.

A ramjet combustor can safely operate at stoichiometric fuel:air ratios. This implies a combustor exit stagnation temperature of the order of 2,400 K (2,130 °C; 3,860 °F) for kerosene. Normally, the combustor must be capable of operating over a wide range of throttle settings, matching flight speeds and altitudes. Usually, a sheltered pilot region enables combustion to continue when the vehicle intake undergoes high yaw/pitch during turns. Other flame stabilization techniques make use of flame holders, which vary in design from combustor cans to flat plates, to shelter the flame and improve fuel mixing. Over-fuelling the combustor can cause the final (normal) shock in the diffuser to be pushed forward beyond the intake lip, resulting in a substantial drop in airflow and thrust.

=== Nozzles ===
The propelling nozzle is a critical part of a ramjet design, since it accelerates exhaust flow to produce thrust.

Subsonic ramjets accelerate exhaust flow with a nozzle. Supersonic flight typically requires a convergent–divergent nozzle.

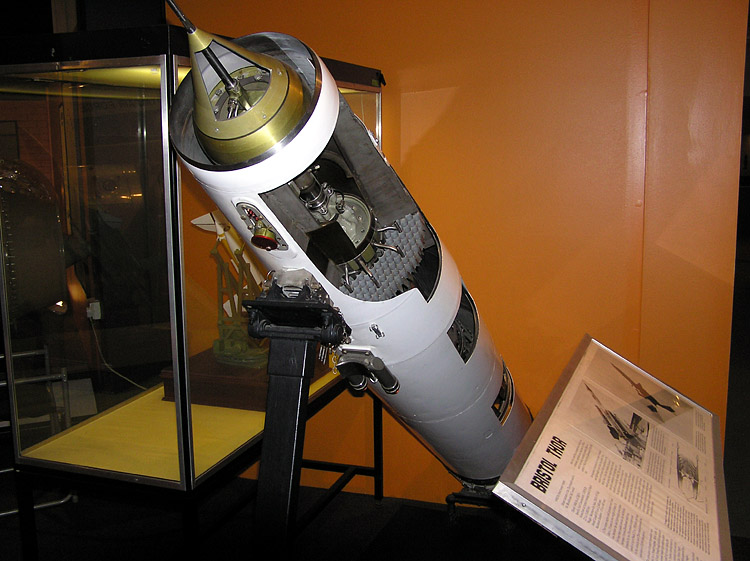
Bristol Thor ramjet modified for display purposes. Two Thor engines were used on the Bristol Bloodhound missile

=== Performance and control ===
Although ramjets have been run as slow as 45 metres per second (160 km/h; 100 mph), below about Mach 0.5 (170 m/s; 610 km/h; 380 mph) they give little thrust and are highly inefficient due to their low pressure ratios.

Above this speed, given sufficient initial flight velocity, a ramjet is self-sustaining. Unless the vehicle drag is extremely high, the engine/airframe combination tends to accelerate to higher and higher flight speeds, substantially increasing the air intake temperature. As this could damage the engine and/or airframe integrity, the fuel control system must reduce fuel flow to stabilize speed and, thereby, air intake temperature.

Due to the stoichiometric combustion temperature, efficiency is usually good at high speeds (around Mach 2 – Mach 3, 680–1,000 m/s, 2,500–3,700 km/h, 1,500–2,300 mph), whereas at low speeds the relatively low pressure means the ramjets are outperformed by turbojets and rockets.

== Control ==
Ramjets can be classified according to the type of fuel, either liquid or solid; and the booster.

=== Liquid fuel ===
In a liquid fuel ramjet (LFRJ), hydrocarbon fuel (typically) is injected into the combustor ahead of a flameholder. The flameholder stabilises the flame with the compressed air from the intake(s). A means of pressurizing and supplying the fuel to the ramcombustor is required, which can be complicated and expensive. This propulsion system was first perfected by Yvonne Brill during her work at Marquardt Corporation.

Aérospatiale-Celerg designed an LFRJ where the fuel is forced into the injectors by an elastomer bladder that inflates progressively along the length of the fuel tank. Initially, the bladder forms a close-fitting sheath around the compressed air bottle from which it is inflated, which is mounted lengthwise in the tank. This offers a lower-cost approach than a regulated LFRJ requiring a pump system to supply the fuel.

=== Take-off ===
A ramjet generates no static thrust and needs a booster to achieve a forward velocity high enough for efficient operation of the intake system. The first ramjet-powered missiles used external boosters, usually solid-propellant rockets, either in tandem, where the booster is mounted immediately aft of the ramjet, e.g. Sea Dart, or wraparound where multiple boosters are attached around the outside of the ramjet, e.g. 2K11 Krug. The choice of booster arrangement is usually driven by the size of the launch platform. A tandem booster increases the length of the system, whereas wraparound boosters increase the diameter. Wraparound boosters typically generate higher drag than a tandem arrangement.

Integrated boosters provide a more efficient packaging option, since the booster propellant is cast inside the otherwise empty combustor. This approach has been used on solid-fuel ramjet (SFRJ) designs, for example 2K12 Kub, liquid, for example ASMP, and ducted rocket, for example Meteor. Integrated designs are complicated by the different nozzle requirements of the boost and ramjet flight phases. Due to the booster's higher thrust levels, a differently shaped nozzle is required for optimum thrust compared to that required for the lower thrust ramjet sustainer. This is usually achieved via a separate nozzle, which is ejected after booster burnout. However, designs such as Meteor feature nozzleless boosters. This offers the advantages of elimination of the hazard to launch aircraft from the boost debris, simplicity, reliability, and reduced mass and cost, although this must be traded against the reduction in performance of a dedicated booster nozzle.

=== Integral rocket ramjet/ducted rocket ===
A slight variation on the ramjet uses the supersonic exhaust from a rocket combustion process to compress and react with the incoming air in the main combustion chamber. This has the advantage of giving thrust even at zero speed.

In a solid fuel integrated rocket ramjet (SFIRR), the solid fuel is cast along the outer wall of the ramcombustor. In this case, fuel injection is through ablation of the propellant by the hot compressed air from the intake(s). An aft mixer may be used to improve combustion efficiency. SFIRRs are preferred over LFRJs for some applications because of the simplicity of the fuel supply, but only when the throttling requirements are minimal, i.e. when variations in altitude or speed are limited.

In a ducted rocket, a solid fuel gas generator produces a hot fuel-rich gas which is burnt in the ramcombustor with the compressed air supplied by the intake(s). The flow of gas improves the mixing of the fuel and air and increases total pressure recovery. In a throttleable ducted rocket, also known as a variable flow ducted rocket, a valve allows the gas generator exhaust to be throttled allowing thrust control. Unlike an LFRJ, solid propellant ramjets cannot flame out. The ducted rocket sits somewhere between the simplicity of the SFRJ and LFRJ's unlimited speed control.

== Flight speed ==
Ramjets generally give little or no thrust below about half the speed of sound, and they are inefficient (specific impulse of less than 600 seconds) until the airspeed exceeds 1,000 kilometres per hour (280 m/s; 620 mph) due to low compression ratios. It takes from 300 mph (485 km/h) at sea level onwards to work effectively.

Even above the minimum speed, a wide flight envelope (range of flight conditions), such as low to high speeds and low to high altitudes, can force significant design compromises, and they tend to work best optimised for one designed speed and altitude (point designs). However, ramjets generally outperform gas turbine-based jet engine designs and work best at supersonic speeds (Mach 2–4). Although inefficient at slower speeds, they are more fuel-efficient than rockets over their entire useful working range up to at least Mach 6 (2,000 m/s; 7,400 km/h).

The performance of conventional ramjets falls off above Mach 6 due to dissociation and pressure loss caused by shock as the incoming air is slowed to subsonic velocities for combustion. In addition, the combustion chamber's inlet temperature increases to very high values, approaching the dissociation limit at some limiting Mach number.

== Related engines ==
=== Air turboramjet ===
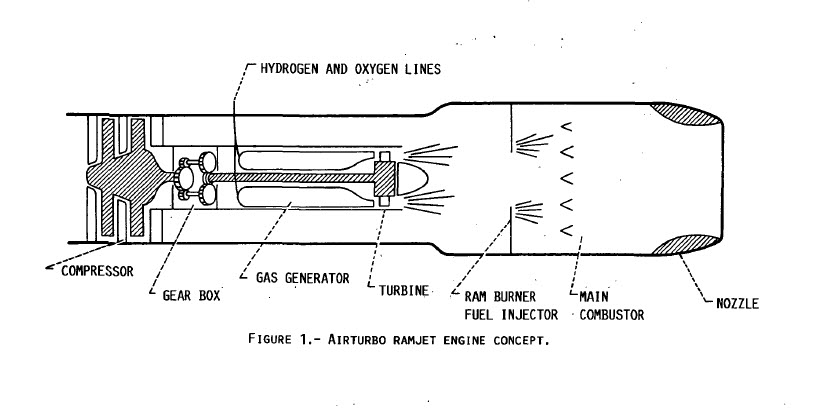
Original schematic of a turboramjet design

Recreated schematic of an air turboramjet, featuring; 1. compressor, 2. gearbox, 3. hydrogen and oxygen lines, 4. gas generator, 5. turbine, 6. ram burner fuel injector, 7. main combustor, 8. nozzle

The air turboramjet engine is a combined cycle engine that merges aspects of turbojet and ramjet engines. The turboramjet is a hybrid engine that essentially consists of a turbojet mounted inside a ramjet. The turbojet core is mounted inside a duct that contains a combustion chamber downstream of the turbojet nozzle. The turboramjet can be run in turbojet mode at takeoff and during low-speed flight but then switch to ramjet mode to accelerate to high Mach numbers.

=== Supersonic-combustion ramjets (Scramjets) ===
Ramjet diffusers slow the incoming air to a subsonic velocity before it enters the combustor. Scramjets are similar to ramjets, but the air flows through the combustor at supersonic speed. This increases the pressure recovered from the streaming air and improves net thrust. Thermal choking of the exhaust is avoided by having a relatively high supersonic air velocity at combustor entry. Fuel injection is often into a sheltered region below a step in the combustor wall.

=== Standing oblique detonation ramjets (Sodramjets) ===
A shock-induced combustion ramjet engine (abbreviated as shcramjet; also called oblique detonation wave engine; also called standing oblique detonation ramjet (sodramjet); or simply referred to as shock-ramjet engine) is a concept of air-breathing ramjet engine, proposed to be used for hypersonic and/or single-stage-to-orbit propulsion applications.

=== Precooled engines ===
A variant of the ramjet is the 'combined cycle' engine, intended to overcome the ramjet's limitations. One example of this is the SABRE engine, which uses a precooler, behind which is the ramjet and turbine machinery.

The ATREX engine developed in Japan is an experimental implementation of this concept. It uses liquid hydrogen fuel in a single-fan arrangement. The liquid fuel is pumped through a heat exchanger in the air intake, simultaneously heating the fuel and cooling the incoming air. This cooling is critical to efficient operation. The hydrogen then continues through a second heat exchanger position after the combustion section, where the hot exhaust is used to further heat the hydrogen, turning it into a high pressure gas. This gas is then passed through the tips of the fan to provide driving power to the fan at subsonic speeds. After mixing with the air, it is burned in the combustion chamber.

The Reaction Engines Scimitar was proposed for the LAPCAT hypersonic airliner, and the Reaction Engines SABRE for the Reaction Engines Skylon spaceplane.

=== Nuclear-powered ramjet ===
==== United States ====
During the Cold War, the United States designed and ground-tested a nuclear-powered ramjet called Project Pluto. This system, intended for use in a cruise missile, used no combustion; a high-temperature, unshielded nuclear reactor heated the air. The ramjet was predicted to be able to fly at supersonic speeds for months. Because the reactor was unshielded, it was dangerous to anyone in or around the vehicle flight path (although its exhaust wasn't radioactive). The project was ultimately cancelled because ICBMs seemed to serve the purpose better.

This type of engine could be used for the exploration of planetary atmospheres such as Jupiter's.

==== Russia ====
On 1 March 2018 President Vladimir Putin announced a nuclear-powered ramjet cruise missile capable of extended long range flight. It was designated 9M730 "Burevestnik" (Petrel) and has the NATO reporting name SSC-X-9 "Skyfall". On 9 August 2019, an explosion and release of radioactive material was recorded at the State Central Navy Testing Range. Recovery efforts were underway to raise a test article that had landed in the White Sea during testing in 2018 when the nuclear power source of the missile detonated and killed 5 researchers.

=== Ionospheric ramjet ===
The upper atmosphere above about 100 kilometres (62 mi) contains monatomic oxygen produced by the sun through photochemistry. A concept was created by NASA for recombining this (thin) gas back to diatomic molecules at orbital speeds to power a ramjet.

=== Bussard ramjet ===
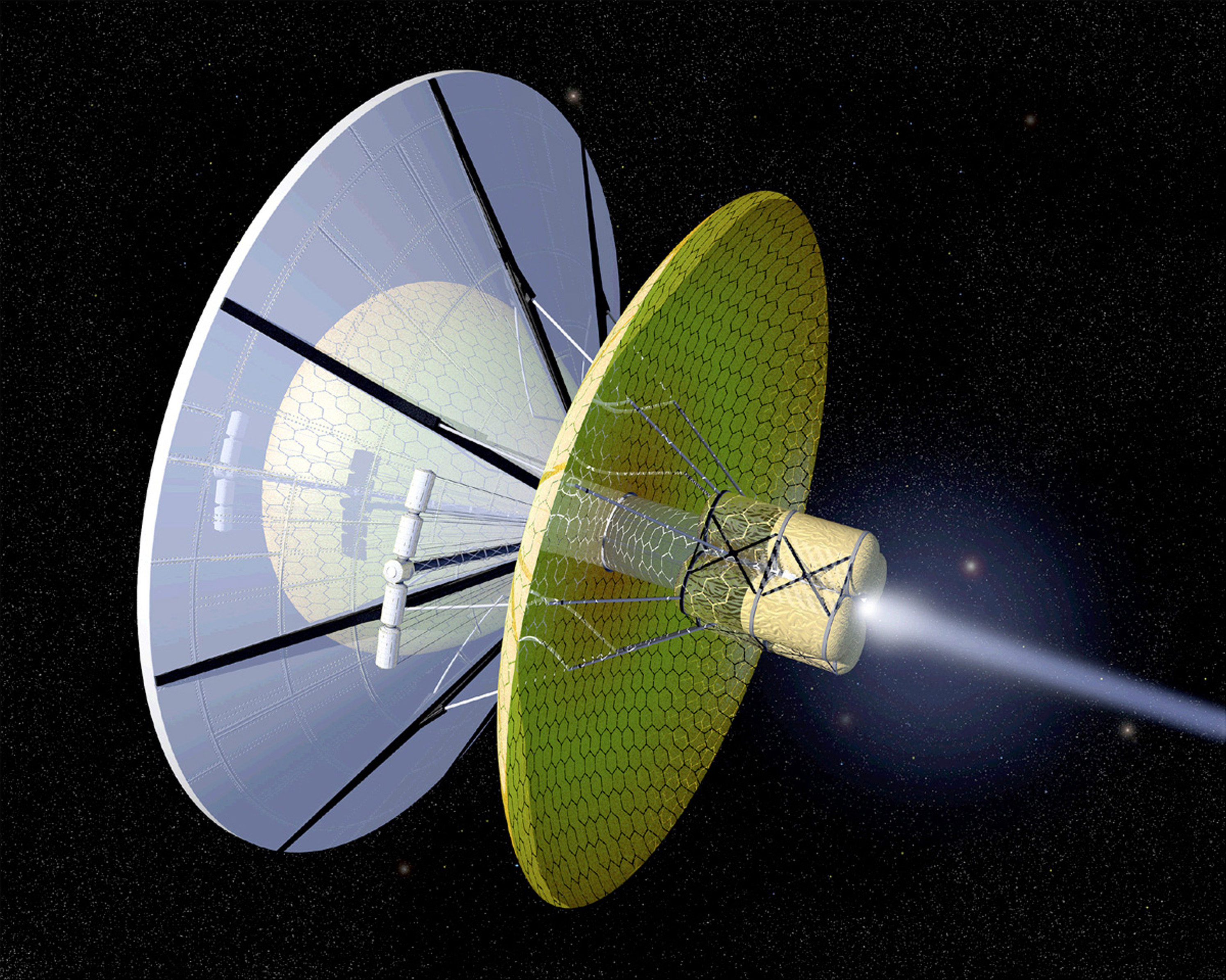
Artist's conception of a Bussard ramjet. A major component of an actual ramjet – a miles-wide electromagnetic field – is invisible.

Bussard ramjet in motion: 1. Interstellar medium; 2. Collect and compress hydrogen; 3. Transport hydrogen beside the payload; 4. Thermonuclear fusion; 5. Engine nozzle; 6. Flue gas jet

The Bussard ramjet is a theoretical method of spacecraft propulsion for interstellar travel. A fast moving spacecraft scoops up hydrogen from the interstellar medium using an enormous funnel-shaped magnetic field (ranging from kilometers to many thousands of kilometers in diameter); the hydrogen is compressed until thermonuclear fusion occurs, which provides thrust to counter the drag created by the funnel and energy to power the magnetic field. The Bussard ramjet can thus be seen as a ramjet variant of a fusion rocket.

=== Ramjet mode for an afterburning turbojet ===
An afterburning turbojet or bypass engine can be described as transitioning from turbo to ramjet mode if it can attain a flight speed at which the engine pressure ratio (epr) has fallen to one. The turbo afterburner then acts as a ramburner. The intake ram pressure is present at entry to the afterburner but is no longer augmented with a pressure rise from the turbomachinery. Further increase in speed introduces a pressure loss due to the presence of the turbomachinery as the epr drops below one.

A notable example was the propulsion system for the Lockheed SR-71 Blackbird with an epr=0.9 at Mach 3.2. The thrust required, airflow and exhaust temperature, to reach this speed came from a standard method for increasing airflow through a compressor running at low corrected speeds, compressor bleed, and being able to increase the afterburner temperature as a result of cooling the duct and nozzle using the air taken from the compressor rather than the usual, much hotter, turbine exhaust gas.

== Aircraft using ramjets ==
- AQM-60 Kingfisher, X-7 derived target vehicles using Marquardt XRJ43-MA ramjet
- Focke-Wulf Super Lorin
- Focke-Wulf Ta 283
- Focke-Wulf Triebflügel
- Heinkel P.1080
- Hiller Hornet (a ramjet-powered helicopter)
- Leduc experimental aircraft
- Lockheed D-21
- Lockheed X-7, 1950 test vehicles
- McDonnell XH-20 Little Henry
- NHI H-3 Kolibrie (helicopter)
- Nord 1500 Griffon
- Republic XF-103, design, to use Wright J67 turbojet + RJ55-W-1 ramjet, never built
- Škoda-Kauba P14

== Missiles using ramjets ==
- 2K11 Krug
- 2K12 Kub
- ASM-3
- Astra
- Bloodhound (missile)
- BrahMos
- CIM-10 Bomarc
- Orbital Sciences GQM-163 Coyote
- Hsiung Feng III
- Kh-31
- MBDA ASMP
- MBDA Meteor
- P-270 Moskit
- P-800 Oniks
- R-77PD
- R-77ME
- Bendix RIM-8 Talos
- Sea Dart
- Supersonic Low Altitude Missile
- North American SM-64 Navaho
- Solid Fuel Ducted Ramjet
- YJ-12

== See also ==
- Index of aviation articles
- Aircraft engine
- Air turborocket
- Jet aircraft
- Jet engine performance
- Liquid air cycle engine
- Turbofan
- Turbojet
- b:Jet Propulsion

== Bibliography ==
- Hallion, Richard P. "The Soviet Stovepipes". Air Enthusiast, No. 9, February–May 1979, pp. 55–60. ISSN 0143-5450.
- Schmidt, Eckart W. (2022). "Ramjet Fuels". Encyclopedia of Liquid Fuels. De Gruyter. pp. 4455–4474. doi:10.1515/9783110750287-037. ISBN 978-3-11-075028-7.
