= Tomasso =

Tomasso is a given name and a surname. Notable people with the name include:

Given name:

- Tomasso Amici, Italian sculptor active in Cremona in the late 15th century
- Tomasso Gagliano (1884–1951), American mobster and boss of the Lucchese crime family, New York City
- Tomasso Petto (1879–1905), New York mobster and leading hitman in the Morello crime family during the early 1900s
- Tomasso I of Saluzzo (1239–1296), the fourth Marquess of Saluzzo from 1244 to his death

Surname:

- Angelo Tomasso Jr. (1925–2015), American construction and concrete executive
- Daniel Di Tomasso, Canadian model and actor
- George A. Tomasso (1927–2010), American construction magnate
- Lisa Tomasso (born 1970), American politician and member of the Rhode Island House of Representatives
- Tiger Joe Tomasso (1922–1988), Canadian professional wrestler
- William A. Tomasso, American construction executive and white collar criminal

== See also ==
- Tomasso Group
- Thomasson (surname)
- Tomas (disambiguation)
- Tomaso
- Tommaso (disambiguation)
