= Di Tommaso =

Di Tommaso is a surname. Notable people with the surname include:

- Apollonio di Giovanni di Tommaso, Italian painter
- Bartolomeo di Tommaso, Italian painter of the Umbro-Sienese school
- David Di Tommaso, French footballer
- Pascal Di Tommaso, French footballer
- Phoebe Di Tommaso, Australian competitive figure skater
- Piero di Tommaso Soderini, Italian statesman of the Republic of Florence
- Yohan Di Tommaso, French footballer

== See also ==
- De Tomaso
- Tommaso (disambiguation)
