= Connecticut Juvenile Training School =

Juvenile prison in Connecticut, US

- Interactive map of Connecticut Juvenile Training School
- Location: Middletown, Connecticut; 41.5544°N 72.6232°W
- Status: Closed
- Security class: High security
- Capacity: 240
- Opened: August 2001
- Closed: April 12, 2018
- Managed by: Connecticut Department of Children and Families

The Connecticut Juvenile Training School (CJTS) was a juvenile prison in Middletown, Connecticut, that operated under the Connecticut Department of Children and Families from 2001 to 2018. Established in proximity to the Connecticut Valley Hospital (CVH), CJTS held male inmates age 12–17 with capacity for 240 inmates. In 2021, Connecticut governor Ned Lamont announced that he was considering reopening the prison to hold immigrant children.

== History ==
=== Planning and Construction ===
During the 1990s, juvenile offenders in the state of Connecticut were typically sent to Long Lane School in Middletown. In 1998, a 15-year old inmate at Long Lane died by suicide, prompting the state to speed up planning for a new correctional facility. This new facility was supposed to offer contemporary rehabilitation programming for inmates. The finance, revenue, and bonding commission of the state government rejected a plan to build three small regional prisons throughout the state, estimated to cost $162 million, in favor of one prison in Middletown on land already owned by the state government, projected to cost $39 million. During this period, Connecticut governor John G. Rowland and other state officials were receiving bribes from the Tomasso Construction Company, a Connecticut construction company, and in turn provided them with state construction contracts worth hundreds of millions of dollars. Officials involved in this conspiracy included the governor's chief of staff Peter N. Ellef and Lawrence Alibozek, a deputy chief of staff whose responsibilities including overseeing DCF. Both men received cash and other items as bribes from the Tomasso Group. Additionally, DCF Commissioner Kristine Ragaglia was at this time engaged in an extramarital affair with Alibozek, her supervisor. The Tomasso Group financed this affair, paying for tens of thousands of dollars for limousine trips, hotel stays, expensive meals, and other gifts for the couple. Beginning early in the planning process for the new prison, these officials began steering the contract to the Tomasso Group, preventing a fair bidding process.

In November 1998, state officials traveled to Ohio to inspect prisons that might serve as models, in particular the Marion Juvenile Correctional Center in Marion which substantially influenced the final CJTS design. Ellef and Alibozek arranged for Tomasso representatives to accompany this group, an opportunity offered to no other construction companies which gave Tomasso a considerable advantage. In August 1999, Rowland declared a crisis in the state's juvenile incarceration system. Rowland used this declared emergency as an excuse to speed up the construction process and deliver the contract to the Tomasso Group without a competitive bidding process. Rowland was assisted in this goal by Ragaglia who, apparently acting on Alibozek's instructions, told an employee to add Tomasso to a shortlist of potential contractors and voted in favor of the group when sitting on the board that ruled on the contract. The five-member board voted 4-1 in favor of giving Tomasso the contract. The day after Tomasso received the contract, they paid $2,700 for a one-night stay for Alibozek and Ragaglia at the Waldorf Astoria, a luxury hotel in New York City. As a result of this corruption, costs increased from $39 to $53 million. Construction began in 1999 and was completed in the time for the prison to open in August 2001, by which time construction costs had increased to $57 million. Hartford Courant journalist Scott Poitras described the facility, as a "sprawling prison-like campus."

Corruption in the construction of CJTS ultimately played a key role in Rowland's downfall. Rowland resigned and subsequently was sentenced to prison. In 2002 Alibozek pleaded guilty to bribery and was sentenced to prison. Ragaglia testified against Rowland, the Tomasso Group, Alibozek, and Ellef in court. She claimed that she thought Alibozek had paid for the gifts they received from Tomasso and that while she had knowingly steered the project to the Tomasso Group her only interest was in seeing the prison built. She was not prosecuted and continued to work for the state. In 2006 both Ellef and Tomasso Group President William A. Tomasso were sentenced to 30 months in prison. By the time these issues came to light, the prison, which Poitras described as "an icon of waste, corruption, and poor planning associated with former Gov. John G. Rowland's administration," was completed and in active use. Connecticut journalist Colin McEnroe described the prison as being unusable at completion.

=== Operation ===
When the prison opened, DCF officials described it as a "model, world-class facility." Despite this initial enthusiasm, the prison quickly developed a poor reputation as both inmates and staff raised serious issues. In November 2001, inmates at a public forum complained that the facility lacked hot showers and computer classes, that vocational and educational programming was largely unavailable, and that there had been issues with staff quitting. Days after this forum, staff protested outside the prison declaring that the facility was understaffed, lacked a clear disciplinary code, and that they felt unsafe. These events prompted Connecticut Attorney General Richard Blumenthal and Connecticut Child Advocate Jeanne Milstein to launch an investigation into the prison, with DCF opening an investigation of its own in March 2002. DCF also hired Edward J. Latessa, a consultant with the National Institute of Corrections, to conduct a review. After a two-month review, Latessa in May 2002 gave the prison an "unsatisfactory" score of 39.4 out of 100, noting many issues including high staff turnover, insufficient staff training and written instructions, and an almost complete lack of internal oversight. By June of that year, the DCF's internal investigation found that staff and youths felt unsafe, therapy programs were nonexistent, and staffing was inadequate, with Ragaglia admitting that the DCF would likely not license CJTS if it was a private facility.

In the months following the Latessa report, Ragaglia attempted some reforms, placing the prison under the supervision of the DCF's behavioral health unit, establishing a committee to review use of restraints, and seeking to address staff shortages. Despite these reforms, the report of the Attorney General and Child Advocate, released in September 2002 after a 10-month investigation, denounced the prison as a "dismal failure" at which children at risk of suicide were left unattended, therapy services were unavailable, and staff employed seclusion and restraints illegally and improperly and underreported their use. Following the report's release, approximately two dozen CJTS employees gathered outside the prison to protest working conditions. Union leaders at the rally reported that staff had suffered 548 injuries and been the victims of 245 assaults. Despite these issues, in 2003 boys previously held at Long Lane, which closed that year, were transferred to CJTS.

Blumenthal and Milstein continued to express concerns about conditions at the facility. In February 2003 they criticized DCF leadership who continued neglecting problems at the prison and in March they called for the creation of a state task force to provide independent oversight. In July, prison teachers reported to the U.S. Department of Education that they faced unsafe workplace conditions and routine sexual harassment and in September lawyers filed a class action lawsuit against DCF calling for the federal government to take control of the agency as it failed to meet court orders to improve services. By November the state had spent $100 million on the prison. In January 2004, the Department of Education's Office for Civil Rights began investigated DCF to see if they violated children's rights by providing different educational opportunities in gender-segregated facilities. In a single weekend in May 2004 eight prison employees were injured in various incidents.

Jodi Rell, who became governor following Rowland's resignation in the face of corruption investigations, inherited a failing prison and embattled child welfare agency. In 2005, DCF released a new report that called for closing the CJTS by 2008 and replacing it with three smaller regional facilities which would allow children to remain in closer contact with their communities and hopefully reduce recidivism, which had been as high as 50%. Rell accordingly developed a plan to close the prison and proposed repurposing the site as either a training and office facility for the Connecticut State Police or an operations center for the Department of Emergency Management and Homeland Security. Rell submitted several budget proposals to the state legislature that would have appropriated approximately $50 million to transition to regional facilities, but legislators declined to fund these facilities as they felt more money for prisons would not solve DCF's issues. Accordingly, not only did the prison remain open but its budget and inmate population increased. Prior to 2008, Connecticut was one of only three U.S. states (along with North Carolina and New York) that treated 16 and 17-year old offenders as adults. A new law that moved these minors into the juvenile system increased CJTS's population and the government spent an additional $8 million on the facility.

In 2005 it had 80 prisoners. At one time it had 147 prisoners.

=== Closure ===
From 2009 to 2018, the total number of juveniles imprisoned in Connecticut fell by approximately 85% and as a result the CJTS population fell despite now including 16 and 17-year olds.

In 2015, the Connecticut state legislature considered a bill to reduce the state's budget deficit that would have closed the prison. Lawmakers removed this section from the bill, with House majority leader Joe Aresimowicz stating that he wanted a guarantee that the 335 people employed at the prison would not be laid off. The day after the legislation was altered, Governor Dannel Malloy announced that he was working to close the prison and committed to do so by July 2018.

In April 2016, the state laid off a significant portion of prison staff. More than 100 staff members were laid off in order to reduce state spending, reduce staffing to reflect the declining prisoner population, and prepare for the 2018 closure. Workers were not told they would be laid off until they arrived at the prison on the day their employment was terminated, prompting union officials to hold a press conference condemning the manner in which staff were dismissed. Former teachers also stated that their sudden dismissal harmed the safety and educational opportunities of imprisoned youths.

By the end of 2016, the facility had 67 prisoners and Malloy continued working towards a 2018 closure. At the start of 2018 the prison ceased receiving additional children and the last prisoners left on April 12 at which point CJTS shut down. DCF had planned on establishing smaller regional facilities for children, but in 2017 the state legislature transferred responsibility for juvenile offenders to the Connecticut Judicial Branch as this agency was seen as having a better record with children already in their custody. The closure was controversial as it was not immediately clear what facilities or programs would replace the prison.

=== Possible Reopening ===
Following the prison's closure, it was proposed that it be demolished and the site redeveloped, but specific plans were not put forward. Matt Lesser, who represented Middletown in the General Assembly, stated that he would work with the state's Juvenile Justice Policy Oversight Committee and relevant city and state authorities to repurpose the site. Mike Lawlor, co-chair of the state's Whiting Task Force authorized by the Connecticut General Assembly to investigate poor conditions at CVH's Whiting Forensic Hospital, suggested relocating patients to the CJTS facility. Lawlor acknowledged that the prison-like housing units were unsuitable for a hospital, but felt that existing facilities for dining and programming made it a suitable location provided housing units were substantially renovated or completely replaced. In 2020, Middletown mayor Ben Florsheim visited the prison investigating the possibility of repurposing it as a shelter for 30-40 unhoused people. Florsheim concluded that the building could not be used for this purpose humanely and in many cases unhoused people would prefer staying outside to entering the prison.

In 2021, Vice President Kamala Harris visited Connecticut and privately asked Governor Ned Lamont to investigate the possibility of providing facilities in the state for the detention of immigrant children. Lamont subsequently visited the prison, accompanied by his wife Ann Lamont and DCF commissioner Vanessa Dorantes, and announced on April 7, 2021 that he was considering reopening the prison for that purpose. Lamont's proposal was criticized by Mayor Florsheim, who stated that “Taking kids out of cages in the Southwest and moving them into cages in the Northeast is not an immigration policy." Lesser, by this time representing Middletown in the Connecticut State Senate, expressed concerns. The Katal Center for Equity, Health, and Justice led the effort to ensure that the closed youth prison was not used to detain young people migrating into the United States. Criticism also came from the Connecticut Justice Alliance, the ACLU of Connecticut, Make the Road Connecticut, and Stop Solitary CT (a group affiliated with the National Religious Campaign Against Torture). As of April 13, 2021, Lamont is expected to make a decision on the facility within the coming days.

== Racism against staff ==
As early as 2009, black employees at CJTS alleged that they faced racism at the workplace. In 2010, four black CJTS workers sued DCF claiming that black workers were passed over for promotions and targeted with disciplinary actions on the basis of race. One of the plaintiffs, youth service officer Cornell Lewis, went on a week-long hunger strike in 2011 protesting racism from the prison staff's predominantly white supervisors. State representatives Matthew Ritter and Douglas McCrory subsequently held a public meeting to share information about racism at the facility and raise awareness on the issue for other state representatives. At this meeting, numerous current and former CJTS workers alleged racist discrimination at the prison, including wrongful termination. In a 2012 incident, Lewis and two other officers were distracted looking at a computer when an inmate suffered what DCF described as a serious injury. As a result, Lewis, who was on the computer for 25 minutes, was fired and another worker who had been looking at the computer for four minutes received an unpaid 29-day suspension. In July 2014, an arbitrator ordered DCF to rehire Lewis and pay back wages for the period of his termination, finding that the firing was far more severe an action than taken against other workers for similar violations and was retaliation for his activism. In 2012, CJTS employee Fred Phillips complained that his locker in the staff area was broken open after a drug-sniffing dog apparently showed interest in it, even though there were no drugs in the locker and the dogs were not supposed to inspect staff lockers. He also claimed that he had been grabbed and shoved by a manager while trying to assist an inmate, an incident for which he filed a police report.

== See also ==
- Juvenile Training School (Japan)
