= William A. Tomasso =

William A. Tomasso, also known as Billy or Bill, is an American construction executive. Tomasso along with the Peter N. Ellef, chief of staff to state governor John G. Rowland, pled guilty on charges related to fast-tracking state contracts to Tomasso's firm in 2006.

== Early life and family ==
William A. Tomasso was born in New Britain, Connecticut to Angelo Tomasso Jr. and Joy Tomasso. He is member of the third generation of the Tomasso family construction dynasty. William attended the Kingswood Oxford School before spending a year abroad at a school in Florence, Italy. He holds a degree in Finance from Babson College.

== Career ==
In 1968 Angelo Tomasso Jr.’s four sons formed Tomasso Brothers Inc. under the umbrella of the family Tomasso Group with William as the President.

The fortunes of the Tomasso group improved when William struck up a close connection to Governor Rowland and got interested in politics. According to the Journal Inquirer William had been a "frequent and respected presence at the state Capitol." Tomasso was able to accompany top Rowland administration aides and officials on trips, sometimes in secret, which gave him an advantage in the subsequent bidding processes.

In 2003 William allegedly stalked and harassed a former Tomasso Group contractor and his wife.

As of 2018 William was the President of TBI Construction. As of 2019 William was a board member of the Greater New Britain Chamber of Commerce and a board member of the Opportunities Industrialization Center (OIC) of New Britain.

=== Trial and imprisonment ===
In 2004 the Tomasso Group, Group president William Tomasso, subsidiary TBI Construction, subsidiary Tunxis Management, and Governor Rowland's Chief of Staff Peter N. Ellef were indicted on numerous charges including fraud, racketeering, bribery, and extortion. Ellef had instructed Connecticut Department of Public Works Commissioner Theodore R. Anson to fast track major public works contracts with the explicit purpose of awarding them to the Tomasso Group.

In 2006 Tomasso and Ellef were each sentenced to 30 months in prison. They both pleaded guilty and Tomasso’s plea deal required him to admit that he bribed his way into the Long Lane School management contract and the $57 million Connecticut Juvenile Training School contract.

== See also ==
- George A. Tomasso
