= Tilcon Connecticut =

Construction company in Connecticut, US

Tilcon Connecticut Inc.
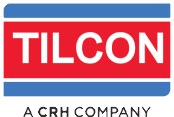

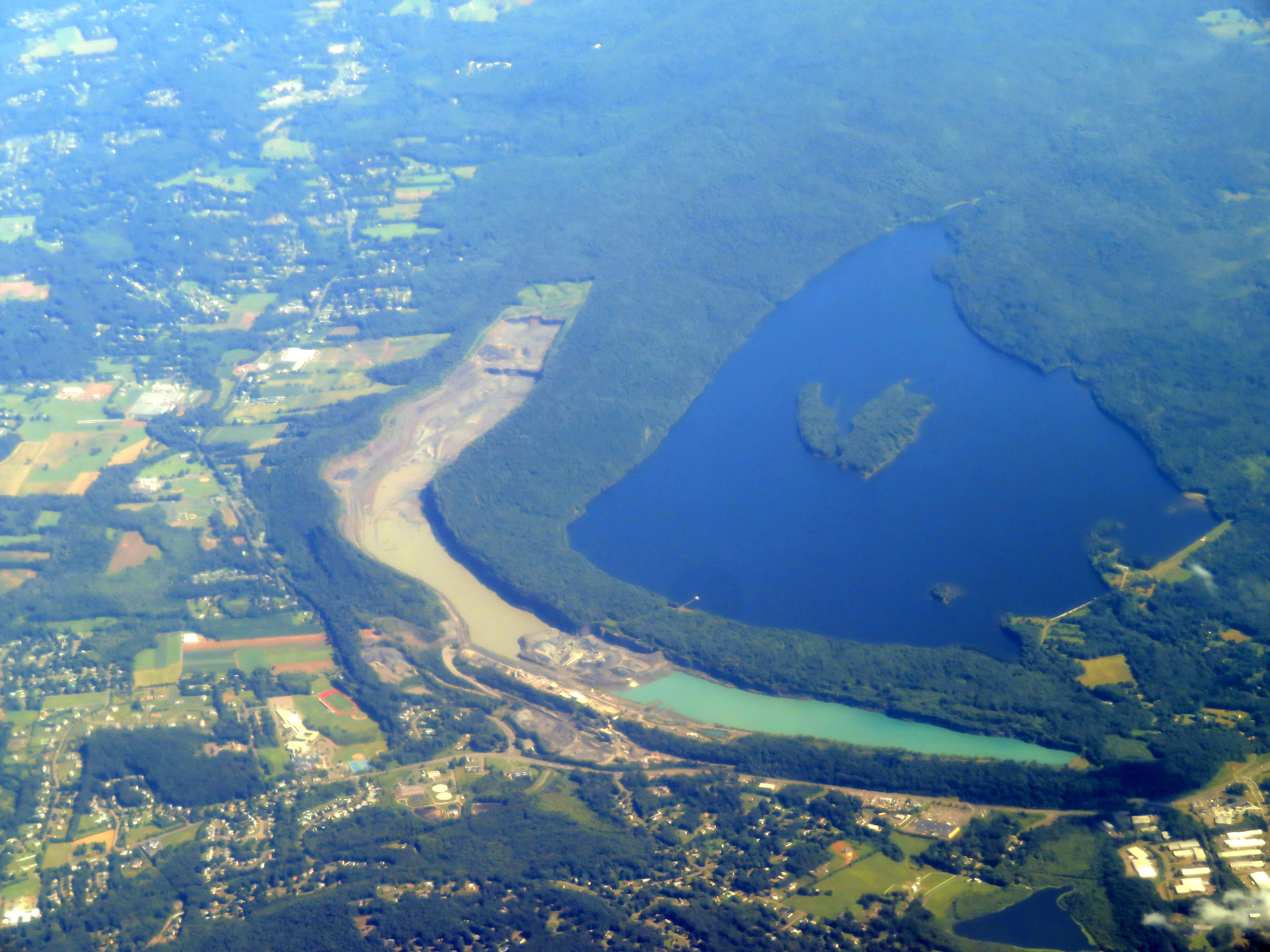
- Tilcon Connecticut's North Branford, CT quarry.
- Formerly: Angelo Tomasso Inc. (1923–1979); Tilcon Tomasso (1979–1990)
- Industry: Construction materials
- Founded: 1923 (as Angelo Tomasso Inc)
- Headquarters: New Britain, Connecticut, U.S.
- Key people: Carolina Cavalcante (President)
- Parent: CRH America
- Website: www.tilconct.com

Tilcon Connecticut, commonly known as Tilcon, is a construction and aggregates company located in the U.S. state of Connecticut. It was founded in 1923 as Angelo Tomasso Inc (today known as the Tomasso Group). As of 2021, the company is a subsidiary of CRH America, which purchased Tilcon in 1996. Tilcon primarily manufactures crushed stone, asphalt, and concrete. The company also works as a construction contractor.

== History ==
=== Angelo Tomasso Inc (1923-1979) ===
The earliest instance of the company was Angelo Tomasso Inc, a construction company founded by its namesake in 1923.

=== Tilcon Tomasso (1979-1990) ===
The company was renamed Tilcon Tomasso in 1979, when it was purchased by British company Thomas Tilling Ltd. Ownership changed to British Tyre and Rubber in 1984.

=== Tilcon Connecticut (1990-present) ===
The company's name was changed to Tilcon Connecticut in 1990 out of recognition of the company's extensive operations in Connecticut.

Tilcon's operations in Connecticut were threatened by Amtrak's electrification project on the Northeast Corridor between New Haven and Boston in 1994. The company said its viability was threatened by increased Amtrak train service, which would force Providence and Worcester Railroad freight trains to run at night on a limited schedule. Tilcon's president said at the time that "It would knock us out of business or limit freight service to the point that we would lose hundreds of jobs."

== Facilities ==
Tilcon operates a total of 23 locations in Connecticut. As of 2017, it is the largest producer of traprock in Connecticut, with five active quarries in the state.

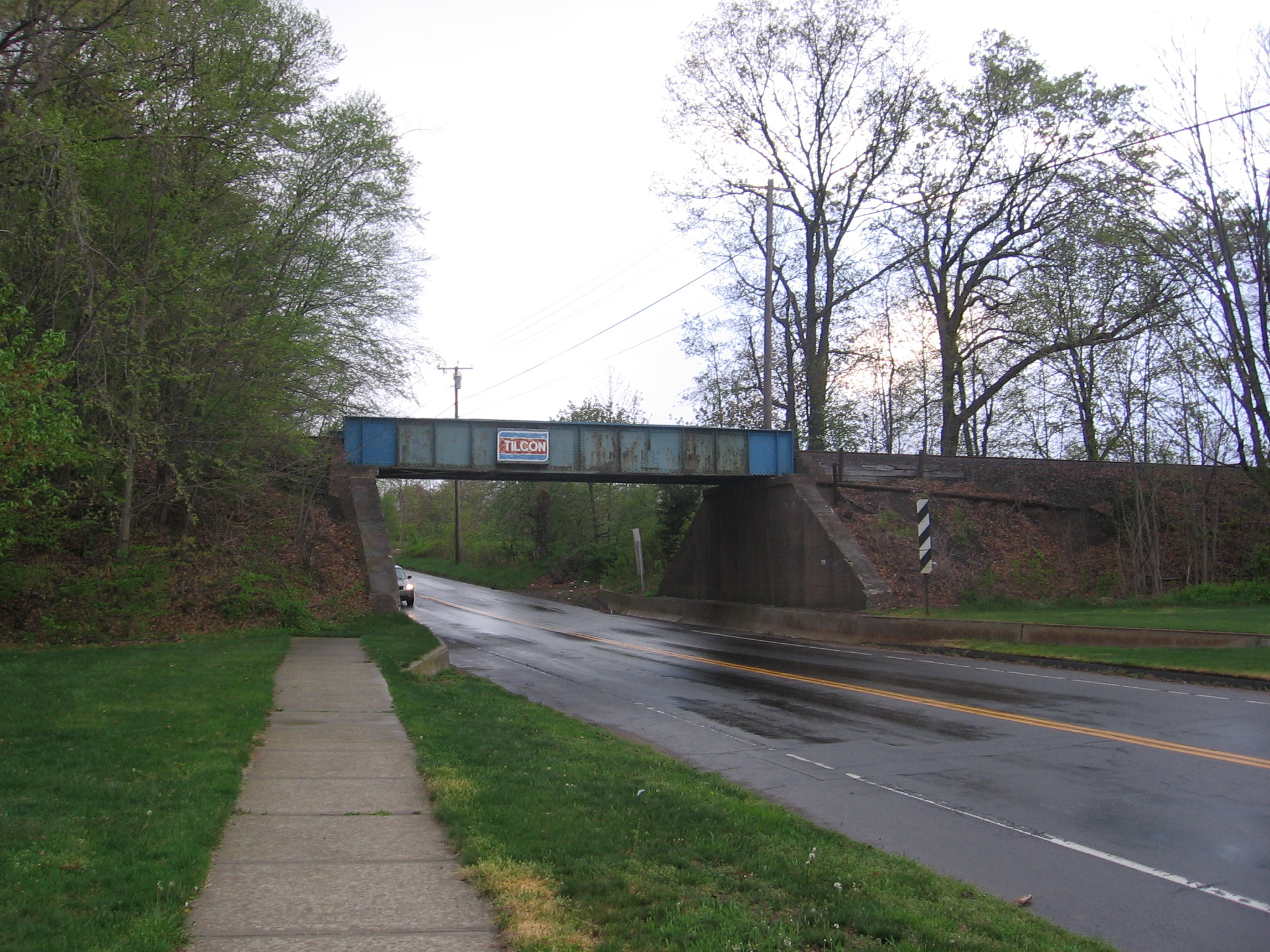
The bridge carrying the Branford Steam Railroad over U.S. Route 1 bears Tilcon's logo.

=== North Branford ===
A major rock quarry is operated by Tilcon in North Branford, Connecticut. The company owns and operates the Branford Steam Railroad which exports rock from the quarry. This quarry first opened in 1914.

=== New Britain / Plainville ===
Tilcon operates a quarry in these two towns. In 2018, the company's attempt to expand its quarry on additional land owned by the city of New Britain was denied by mayor Erin Stewart over concerns of environmental impact.
