= Branford Steam Railroad =

Railroad in Connecticut, United States

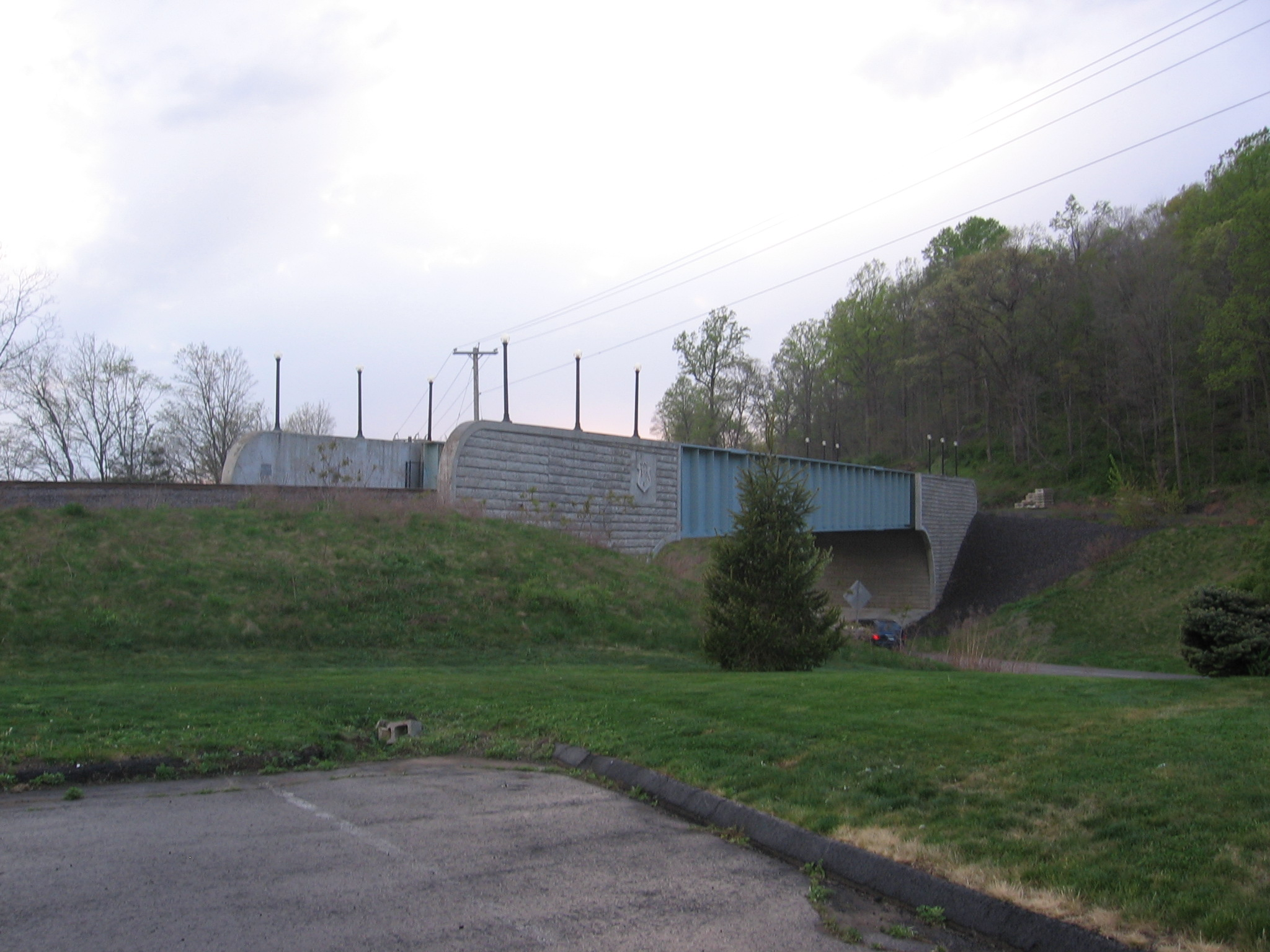
- Bridge over Route 80 in North Branford just outside the quarry

Overview
- Parent company: Tilcon Connecticut
- Headquarters: North Branford, Connecticut
- Reporting mark: BSRR
- Locale: North Branford to Stony Creek, Connecticut, U.S.
- Dates of operation: 1903–present

Technical
- Track gauge: 4 ft 8 1/2 in (1,435 mm) standard gauge
- Length: 7.2 miles (11.6 km)

Other
- Website: Official website

The Branford Steam Railroad (reporting mark BSRR) is a standard-gauge 7.2-mile (11.6 km) industrial railroad that serves the Tilcon Connecticut stone quarry in North Branford, Connecticut, in the United States. It was founded in 1903 by Louis A. Fisk, a businessman from Branford, Connecticut, to transport passengers to a trotting park for horses. Fisk also chartered the Damascus Railroad in 1905 to extend the route of the Branford Steam Railroad to North Branford to serve quarries. The Damascus Railroad's charter was amended in 1907 to allow a further extension to the site of a new quarry adjacent to Totoket Mountain. The Branford Steam Railroad took control of the Damascus Railroad in 1909, and has been the operator since.

By 1916, the Branford Steam Railroad had ended passenger business in favor of freight transport. The company has hauled trap rock from the Totoket Mountain quarry in North Branford continuously since 1914. That year, Fisk sold the railroad to a group seeking to develop a quarry, including Hayden, Stone & Co. and the Blakeslee family of New Haven, who in turn formed the New Haven Trap Rock Company, which became operator of both the quarry and the Branford Steam Railroad. Following a route dispute with the Shore Line Electric Railway, the Branford Steam Railroad built an extension southward to a dock at Pine Orchard on Long Island Sound, which remains in use today to transfer stone to barges for distribution. Trap rock is also transported by rail to an interchange with the Providence and Worcester Railroad.

In 1954, the Branford Steam Railroad purchased its first diesel locomotive; its last steam locomotive was retired in 1960, leaving the company a steam railroad only in name. The name has been retained to distinguish the company from the Branford Electric Railway, a museum dedicated to streetcars also located in Branford.

== History ==
=== Founding ===
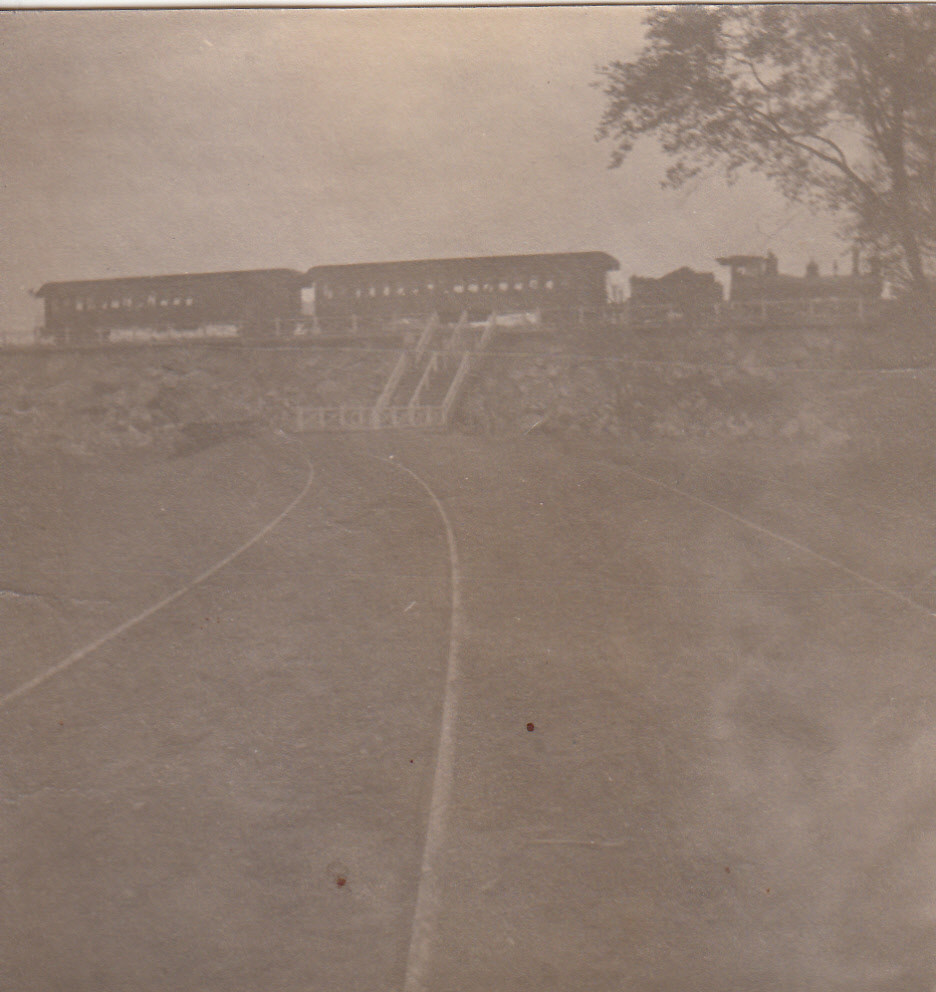
A Branford Steam Railroad train at the trotting park

Louis A. Fisk was a politically connected businessman from Branford, Connecticut, who had by the 1890s built a trotting park for horses called the Branford Driving Park. Initially, park patrons who arrived in the area via the New York, New Haven and Hartford Railroad's (known simply as The New Haven) Shore Line Division could disembark at the Pine Orchard station and travel to the park on a 1.5-mile (2.4 km) horse-powered railroad. Fisk, who sought to improve on this horse-drawn service, in December 1902 petitioned the Connecticut General Assembly, the state's legislative branch, for permission to convert the railroad to steam power. Following a favorable report by the legislature's railroad committee in February 1903, Fisk received authorization to build the railroad on March 19, 1903. The new company was named the Branford Steam Railroad (BSRR) to distinguish it from the Branford Electric Railway, a streetcar system in Branford. The line was built to 4 ft 8 1/2 in (1,435 mm) standard gauge.

=== Damascus Railroad ===
In 1900, the creation of the Palisades Interstate Park Commission of New York and New Jersey forced the closing of basalt quarries along the Hudson River. This led to an increased demand for stone from Connecticut quarries. On July 18, 1905, Fisk received a charter for another railroad company, known as the Damascus Railroad, which built an extension from the BSRR's northern terminus to North Branford. Unlike the Branford Steam Railroad, this company was strictly a freight railroad and was not authorized to carry passengers. Instead, the railroad served Branford quarries for trap rock—igneous rock used as track ballast, fill material for roadways, construction aggregate, and riprap.

==== Charter modification controversy ====
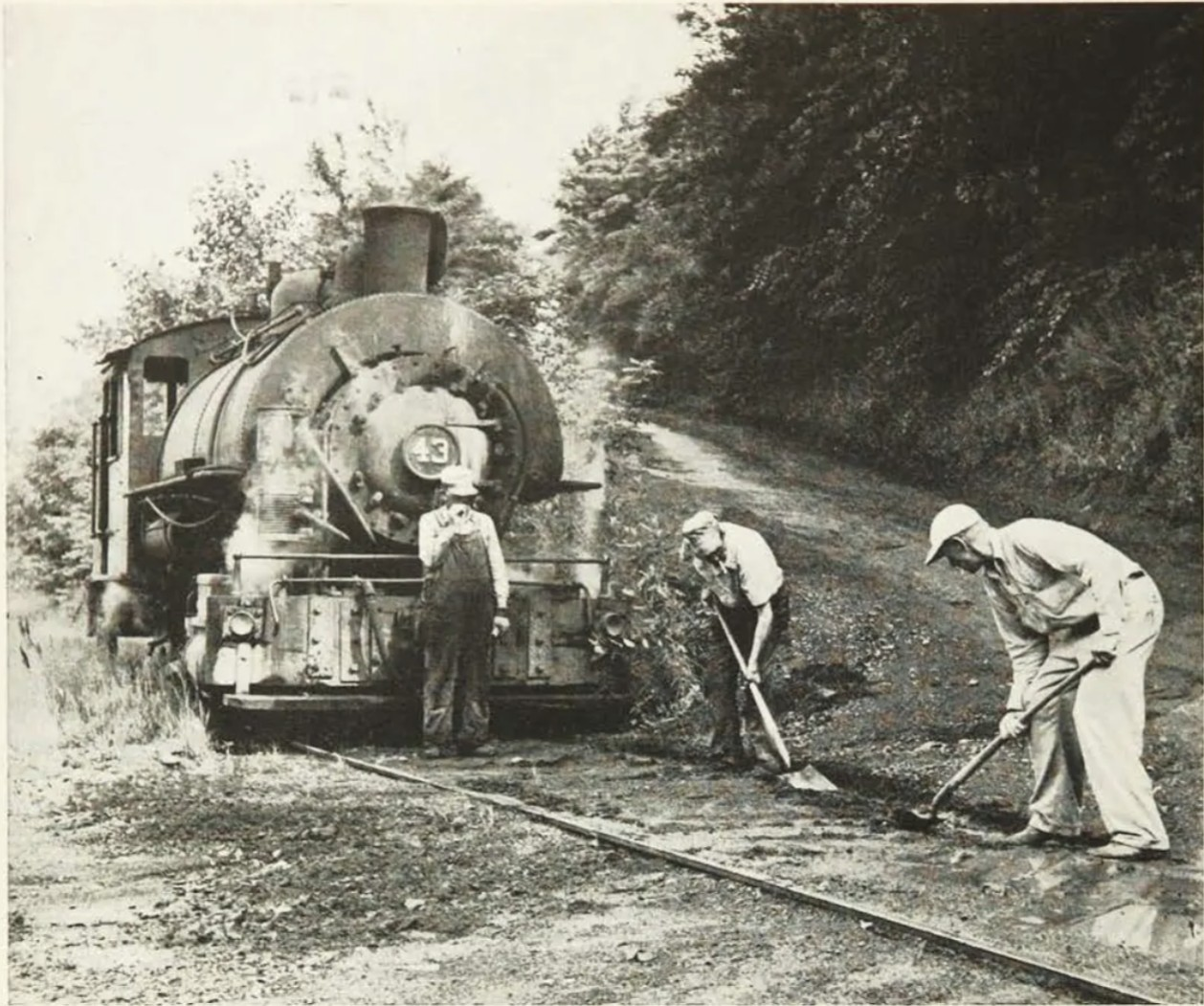
New Haven Trap Rock Co. 43 at Foxon, Connecticut, in 1957

In 1907, Fisk decided to open a quarry on Totoket Mountain in North Branford. He applied for a modification to the Damascus Railroad's charter, allowing the company to extend to the quarry site. Fisk attended a town meeting in Branford on March 26 and canvassed support from the town's residents for the railroad extension, finding most residents in favor. Despite local enthusiasm, the proposed modification of the railroad's charter faced multiple challenges in the state legislature. The bill to modify the charter initially passed the state house and senate. In early June, a state representative objected to the amended charter because it empowered the Damascus Railroad, a private company, to exercise eminent domain (the power to take control of private property for a public use). The representative argued that eminent domain is a power reserved for the government for public benefit. As a result, the bill was temporarily recalled, until on June 7 state Attorney General Marcus H. Holcomb pronounced the bill legal, because the railroad served a public purpose.

While this first challenge to the bill was resolved, on July 12 the bill was vetoed by governor Rollin S. Woodruff, who objected to the charter because it allowed for multiple grade crossings, and because he objected to eminent domain being used for a railroad that would not carry any passengers. The governor indicated he would support the modified charter only if efforts were made to avoid grade crossings as much as possible, per state policy. After much argument, the house and senate overrode the governor's veto on July 16, allowing the modified charter to take effect.

=== Expansion ===
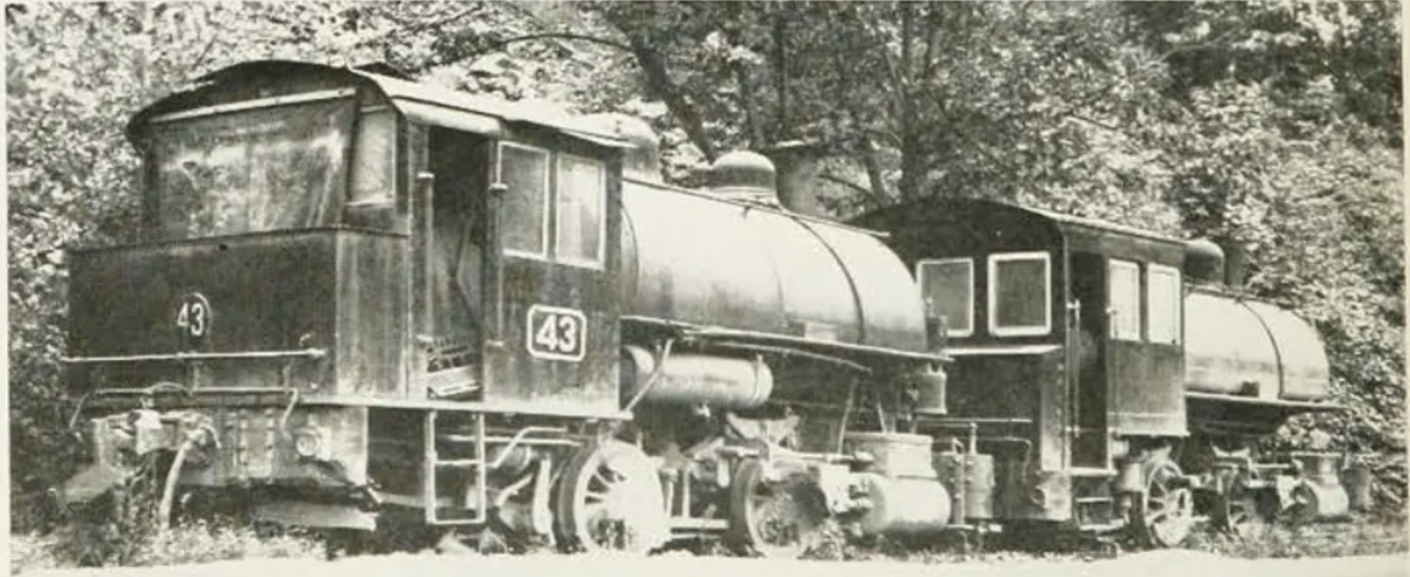
New Haven Trap Rock Co. 43 and 38 in 1962, stored after their retirement

While the modified Damascus Railroad charter allowed Fisk to expand rail operations northward, he also sought to expand the Branford Steam Railroad's tracks southward to a dock he owned at Juniper Point on Long Island Sound (between the Pine Orchard and Stony Creek neighborhoods of Branford). To this end, he announced in December 1908 that the Branford Steam Railroad would apply for an amendment to its charter in the next session of the state legislature allowing an extension southward, along with improved interchange facilities with the New Haven Railroad. The proposed amendment would also authorize the railroad to connect to any quarries along its right of way, and allow the Branford Steam Railroad to assume corporate control of the Damascus Railroad by purchasing its stock. On April 29, 1909, the Connecticut General Assembly approved the amendment to the charter, allowing construction to proceed southward and the BSRR to take direct control of the Damascus Railroad.

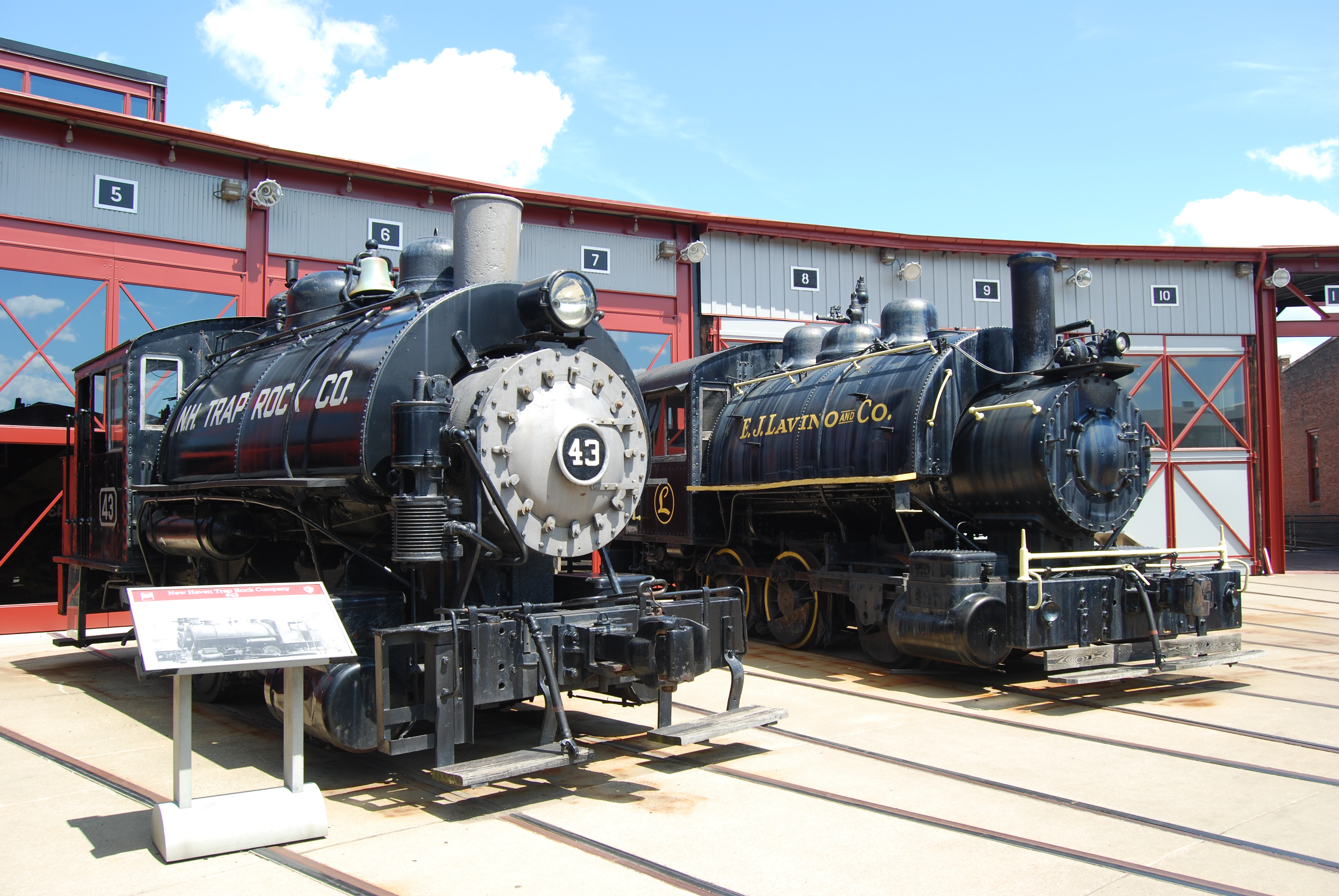
New Haven Trap Rock Co. Number 43 operated on the Branford Steam Railroad until 1960. It is preserved at Steamtown.

At the same time, the Shore Line Electric Railway began to build a line between New Haven and Old Saybrook. The two proposed railroad lines intersected in North Branford, which caused a dispute between the two companies. The Branford Steam Railway received permission to build its extension to the coast by crossing most streets at grade (on the same level). Meanwhile, the Shore Line Electric Railway's proposed route was also at grade, which would require the two railroads to intersect with a diamond crossing (a crossing where tracks intersect one another at the same level), setting off a dispute between the two companies.

Initially, the Shore Line attempted to build across the BSRR's right of way, but was forced to stop by an injunction. The Branford Steam Railroad petitioned the Connecticut Railroad Commission for approval of its proposed expansion to the dock at Juniper Point on March 21, 1910. Three days later, the Shore Line responded with its own petition requesting approval of its planned route, crossing the BSRR at grade. Shortly afterwards, a third petition was submitted to the commission, this time by two selectmen of North Branford who were in support of the Shore Line's proposed route. The commission decided in favor of the BSRR on June 30, 1910, ruling that its proposed right of way could go ahead, as it was authorized by the state legislature. The commission also ruled that the Shore Line could not cross the BSRR at grade, citing state laws prohibiting steam and electric railroads from crossing at grade in general. The petition by the selectmen was also denied, as the commission asserted it was premature.

The Shore Line refused to accept this, and filed a nearly identical petition to the commission shortly afterwards, this time with the direct support of the two North Branford selectmen. In February 1911, this second petition was also denied by the commission, which stated that it lacked the authority to allow the Shore Line's proposed route to interfere with the approved route of the BSRR. The Shore Line Electric Railway was undeterred by its repeated losses before the commission, and conceived a new strategy to build its line through North Branford – a property owner in the contested area transferred his property to the Shore Line, which immediately commenced construction in earnest with 200 workmen on the night of February 4 in an attempt to secure the right of possession. Fisk promptly sued, and following an emergency summons again obtained an injunction forcing the Shore Line to cease construction. The entire police force of Branford was summoned to halt work at four A.M. on February 5.

Litigation over the issue continued for two years, until the Connecticut Supreme Court ruled in Fisk's favor on February 6, 1914, and ordered the Shore Line to allow the Branford Steam Railroad to build its proposed railroad line.

=== New Haven Trap Rock Company ===
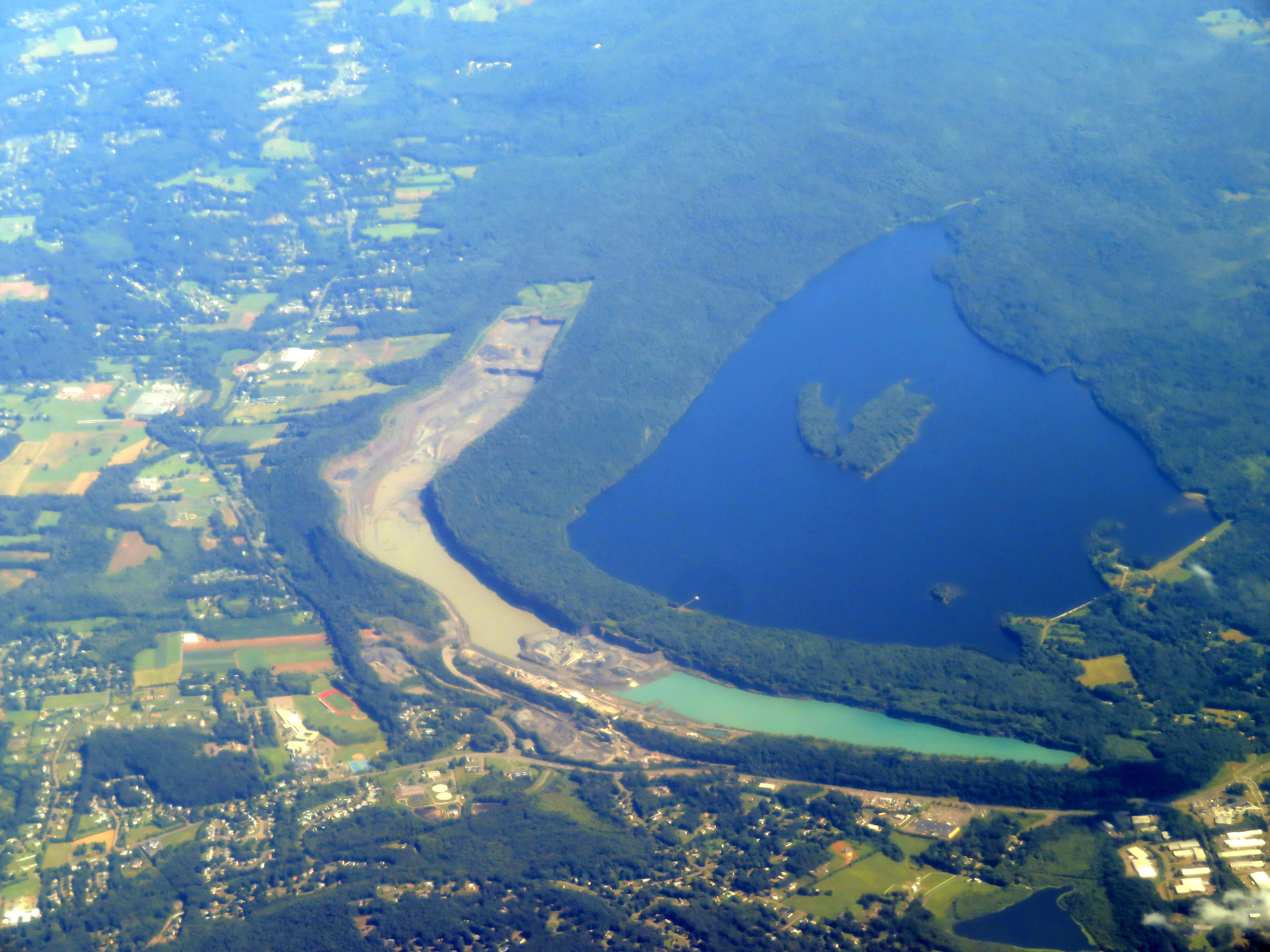
An aerial view of the North Branford quarry that the Branford Steam Railroad serves. The company's tracks can be seen in the bottom right of the image.

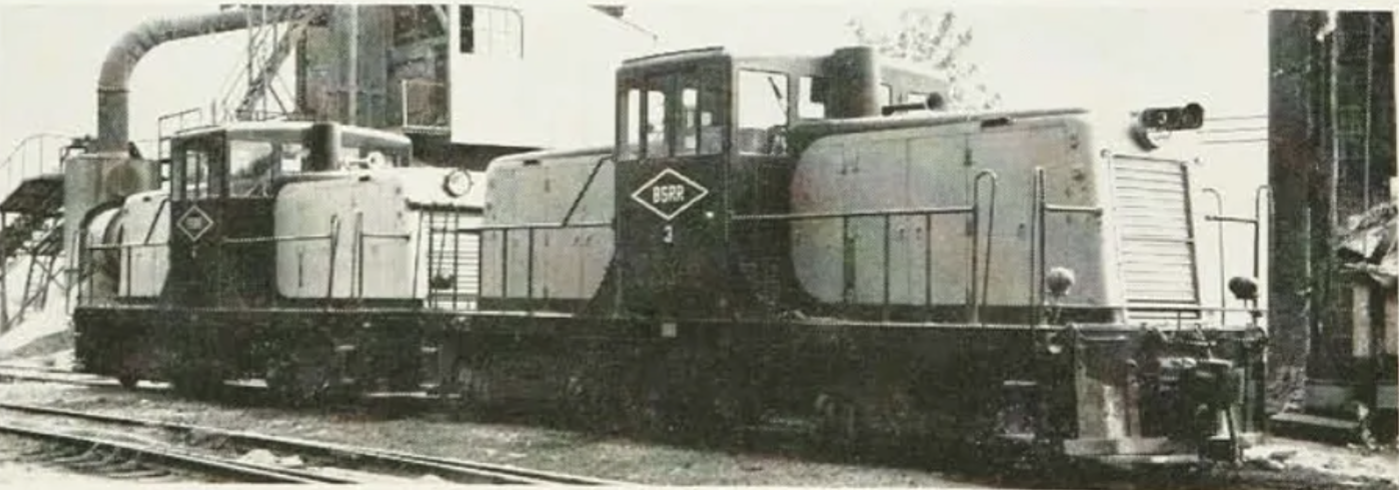
Two General Electric switchers owned by the railroad in 1962

Fisk's interests in both the Branford Steam Railroad and the quarry were purchased by a group of bankers in 1914, on behalf of a group of clients seeking to develop the quarry. These clients included the Blakeslee family of New Haven and Hayden, Stone & Co., who in April 1914 jointly incorporated the New Haven Trap Rock Company, which began operating a new quarry on Totoket Mountain. The Blakeslee family owned the C.W. Blakeslee and Sons construction firm, founded in 1844. As part of the joint venture, the New Haven Trap Rock Company committed $750,000 (equivalent to $26 million in 2025) to develop quarries and to complete the extension of the Branford Steam Railroad to the docks on Long Island Sound, which had been held up by the railroad's dispute with the Shore Line Electric Railway. By 1916, the railroad had ceased hauling passengers and was exclusively a freight railroad. The quarry quickly grew, soon becoming the primary customer of the Branford Steam Railroad. The Blakeslees subsequently bought out Hayden, Stone & Co., becoming sole owners of the quarry and railroad.

Several locomotives were used within the 300-acre (120 ha) quarry complex. Within the quarry itself, several 0-4-0T 15-short-ton (13.6-metric-ton; 13.4-long-ton) saddle tank locomotives hauled excavated stone in gondola cars to the plant's rock crusher. Two heavier locomotives, a 4-6-0 and 2-6-0 (BSRR 1 and 2 respectively), were used to haul crushed stone from the quarry, either to Juniper Point for loading into barges, or to the New Haven Railroad interchange in Pine Orchard.

In 1935, the New Haven Trap Rock Company merged with the Connecticut Quarries Company. With this merger, the New Haven Trap Rock Company became owner of a total of six quarries across Connecticut, including the North Branford quarry. Around the time of the merger, the tracks within the quarry were removed and all but two of the saddle tank locomotives were sold. The 4-6-0 was retired around this time as well. The railroad continued to haul stone from the crusher to Pine Orchard, and operations continued largely unchanged throughout the next decade.

=== Dieselization and ownership changes ===
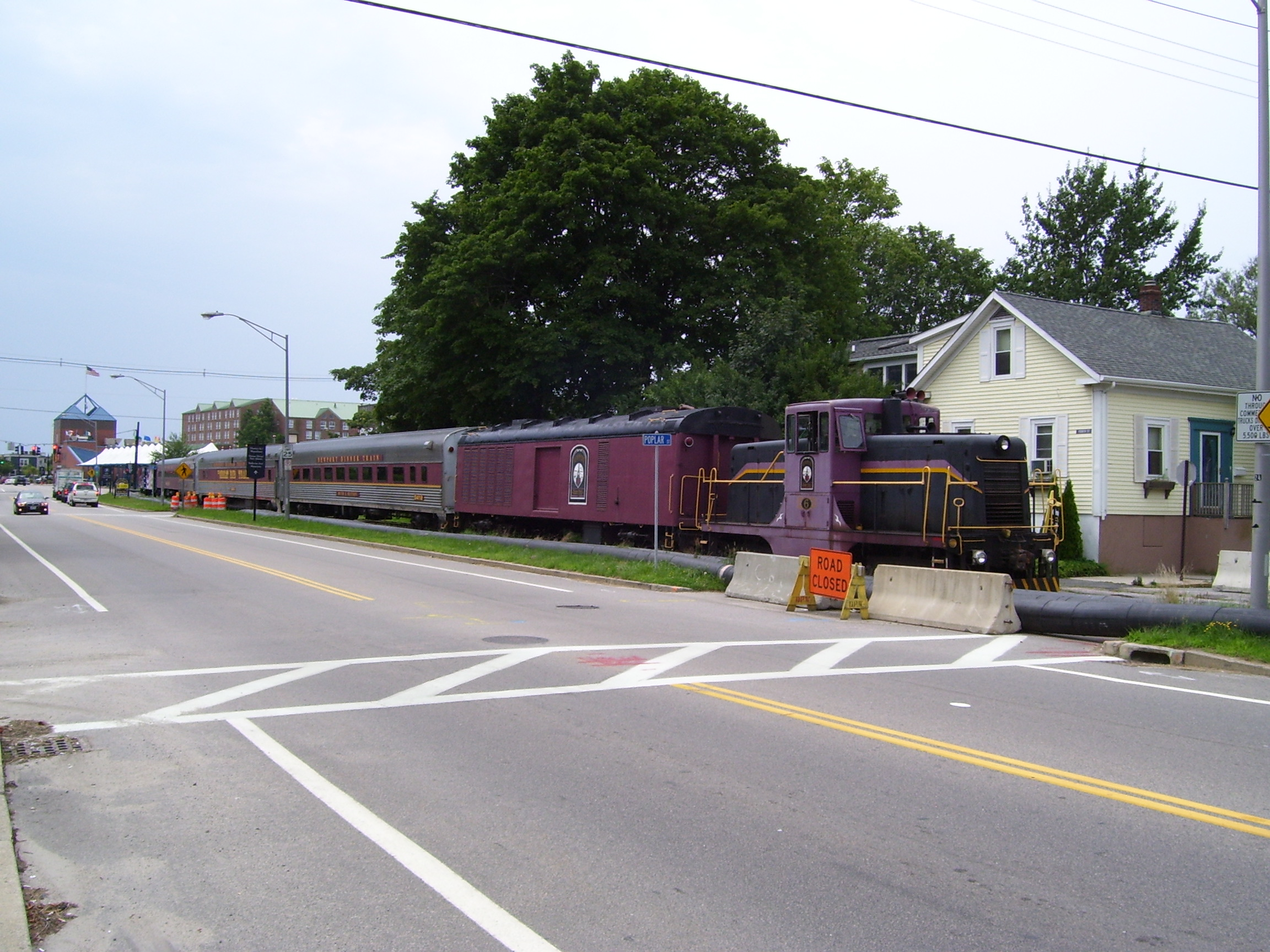
GE 44-tonner number 6 served for a time on the Branford Steam Railroad. In 2006 it was acquired by the Newport and Narragansett Bay Railroad.

Dieselization was taking hold in the United States after World War II, and in 1951 the Branford Steam Railroad purchased its first diesel locomotive, a second-hand GE 44-ton switcher given the number 3. Five years later, the railroad bought two new GE 44-tonners, which took over hauling trains between the crusher and Pine Orchard. The two saddle tank locomotives continued to perform switching duties until January 1960, when the company bought another 44-tonner from the New Haven Railroad. From this point, the Branford Steam Railroad was a "steam railroad" only in name; the name continued to distinguish it from the Branford Electric Railway also operating in Branford. Both of the retired steam locomotives were acquired by Steamtown, U.S.A. in 1962 for preservation. Around the same time, the side-dump gondola cars were replaced with triple-bay hopper cars. The Branford Steam Railroad purchased a new EMD SW1001 in February 1976; the locomotive was delivered in red, white, and blue paint to commemorate the United States Bicentennial.

In addition to the quarry, the Branford Steam Railroad also served local shippers located along its line. In the 1960s, a dedicated spur line existed to a local steel company, with Branford Steam Railroad trains connecting it to the New York, New Haven and Hartford Railroad.

Originally, all five of the railroad's grade crossings were staffed by dedicated railroad crossing guards. Only the crossing at Pleasant Point Road, just south of the railroad's rail yard near the Pine Orchard docks, continued to have a guard until 1972. Interviewed by a curious New Haven Register reporter, the guard shared that automated crossing devices had gradually replaced guards. The Pleasant Point Road crossing's proximity to the yard, trains frequently crossing during switching movements, during which the guard was responsible for operating a railroad switch, and the fact that trains heading for the dock would pass by at high speed to climb the grade to the dock justified a guard at that crossing until 1972, when dedicated warning lights were installed and automation of the switch was imminent. Trains ran to and from the docks approximately hourly during the day. The railroad's name continued to attract railfans from across the Northeastern United States who incorrectly assumed the word "steam" indicated a heritage railroad.

In August 1968, the New Haven Trap Rock Company was purchased by Ashland Inc.'s construction division. Ashland also purchased Angelo Tomasso, Inc in 1972, and formed a new company called NHTR Tomasso. Thomas Tilling, Ltd in turn purchased NHTR Tomasso in 1979, renaming it Tilcon Tomasso, and then sold the company to British Tire and Rubber in 1984. Tilcon Tomasso renamed itself Tilcon Connecticut in 1990, and was purchased by CRH plc in 1996.

In 2009, the State of Connecticut applied for a Transportation Investment Generating Economic Recovery (TIGER) grant on behalf of the Branford Steam Railroad. The grant cited a need to replace the railroad's EMD SW1001 switcher and its hopper cars. As of 2024, the railroad uses an EMD GP38-2 leased from GATX for most trains.

== Operations ==
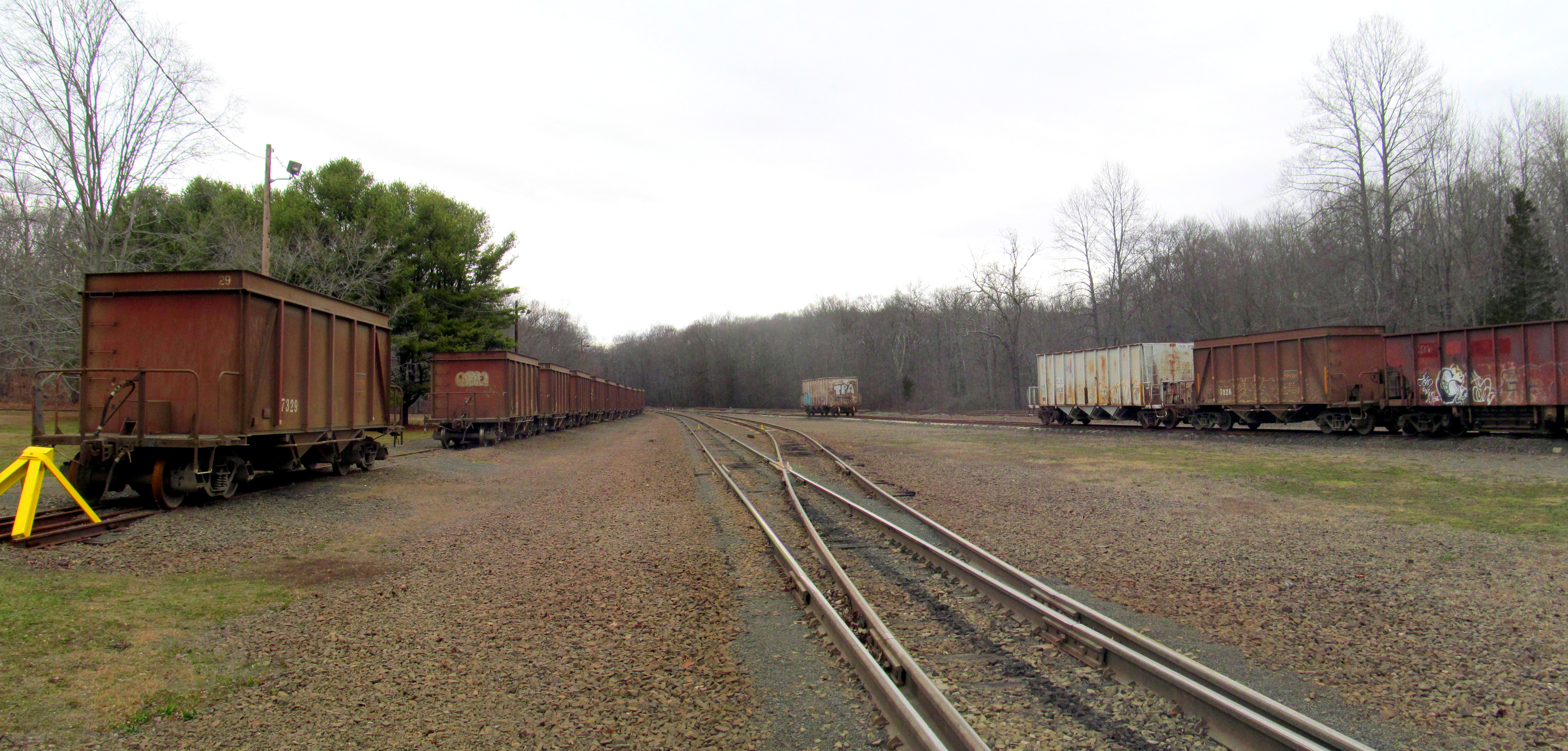
The railroad's yard at Pine Orchard. The hopper cars are used to carry stone from the quarry.

The Branford Steam Railroad reported hauling approximately 1.3 million tons (1.17 million metric tons) of freight in 2010. As of 2012, the BSRR has a total of 7.2 miles (11.6 km) of track. As of 2022, the Branford Steam Railroad continues to serve the Tilcon Connecticut quarry in North Branford. Some aggregate is transferred to the Providence and Worcester Railroad at the Pine Orchard interchange, but the majority is brought to the docks of the Buchanan Marine Company (like the BSRR, a Tilcon Connecticut subsidiary), where it is loaded onto barges. At the docks, an enclosed and soundproofed building covers the unloading platform, where hopper cars are unloaded and aggregate sorted by size and then transferred to barges by a conveyor. Tilcon Connecticut uses these barges, operated by subsidiary Buchanan Marine Company, to transport aggregate to locations across the Northeastern United States. Traprock from the quarry historically has also been widely used as track ballast, including via direct pickups by Amtrak maintenance of way trains.
