= Mark J. Marcus =

American politician (1941–2020)

Mark J. Marcus (February 3, 1941 – June 20, 2020) of Westport, Connecticut, and Jupiter, Florida, was an American public official and politician. He was commissioner of the Connecticut Department of Children and Families in the 1970s and 1980s, serving in the administrations of governors Ella T. Grasso and William O'Neill. Marcus also served as executive assistant to the chairman of Connecticut Department of Public Utility Control. He was a member of the Connecticut Justice Commission, the Governor's Commission on the Homeless, and the Governor's Commission on Family Violence. He was compact administrator for the Interstate Compact on Juveniles, and was a member of the Connecticut Commission on Child Support. He also served on the State Advisory Committee of the United States Commission on Civil Rights.

In his home town of Westport, Connecticut, Marcus served as a justice of the peace and as vice-chairman of the Westport Democratic Town Committee. He served as a member of the board of selectmen, vice-chairman of the Planning and Zoning Commission, member of the Board of Assessment Appeals, member of the Charter Revision Commission and chairman of the Democratic Town Committee.

Marcus was serving his fourth term as a member of the Democratic State Central Committee of Connecticut from the 26th District, representing the Towns of Westport, Wilton, Ridgefield, Weston, Redding, Bethel and New Canaan.

A graduate of the University of Connecticut, Marcus had been a guest lecturer in public administration at Yale University and the University of Connecticut.

Marcus died on June 20, 2020, in Juniper, Florida, of pancreatic cancer.
