= Connecticut Department of Children and Families =

State agency of Connecticut, US

Agency overview
- Jurisdiction: Government of Connecticut
- Headquarters: 505 Hudson Street Hartford, CT 06106
- Agency executive: Vanessa Dorantes, Commissioner
- Website: portal.ct.gov/dcf

The Connecticut Department of Children and Families (DCF) is a state agency responsible for child welfare and family services in Connecticut. Its headquarters are located in Hartford.

== Mission and Responsibilities ==
The Connecticut Department of Children and Families (DCF) is responsible for child protection, behavioral health, juvenile justice, and supporting families through prevention and intervention programs. Its mission is to ensure the safety, permanency, and well-being of all children in Connecticut through effective and compassionate services. DCF also manages foster care, adoption, mental health programs for youth, and educational services through Unified School District #2.

== Structure & Divisions ==
DCF operates through multiple bureaus including:

- Bureau of Child Welfare Services
- Bureau of Juvenile Services
- Bureau of Behavioral Health Services
- Bureau of Quality Improvement

It also oversees Unified School District #2 (USD#2), an accredited school district providing education in DCF-operated facilities.

== History ==
The Connecticut Department of Children and Youth Services was established in 1970. The Long Lane School became a part of the new department in 1970.

In 1989, a group of plaintiffs instituted an action against the Connecticut Department of Children and Youth Services which resulted in a requirement for federal court supervision of DCF, which has continued for more than two decades. The Connecticut DCF, as recently as 2012, was under this supervision due to its inability to correct the problems identified.

The department received its current name in 1993.

In July 2003 employees of the Connecticut Juvenile Training School (CJTS) filed a complaint with federal authorities, stating that the DCF did not do enough to protect youths from sexual assault and violence and that the DCF gave girls at contracted facilities fewer opportunities than the boys at CJTS. The Boston Office for Civil Rights of the U.S. Department of Education began an investigation.

== Bureau of Juvenile Services ==
The Bureau of Juvenile Services operated the state's correctional facilities for children; it received its current name in 2003.

=== Corrections for boys ===
The Connecticut Juvenile Training School (CJTS) was the state's secure facility for delinquent boys. The CJTS was located in Middletown. The $57 million juvenile correctional center opened in August 2001. The Walter G. Cady School part of Unified School District #2 (USD #2) served residents of the CJTS. CJTS closed in 2018.

=== Long Lane School ===
The State of Connecticut previously operated the Long Lane School in Middletown, a juvenile correctional facility for boys and girls aged 11–16. As of 2002 about 35 girls resided there. The facility had three cottages for boys and one for girls.

In 2002 the Government of Connecticut announced that the Long Lane School, then the state's designated juvenile center for girls, was closing. Girls were moved to the Connecticut Children's Place in East Windsor. The closure occurred after the Attorney General of Connecticut, Richard Blumenthal, and state child advocate, Jeanne Milstein, investigated a suicide attempt at Long Lane and then asked DCF to review its practices regarding the safety of delinquent girls. Long Lane was scheduled to close on December 30, 2003.

=== Corrections for girls post-2003 ===
By 2002 several adjudicated girls had run away from Children's Place, which was designed as an open community.

By 2009 the state was using York Correctional Institution, an adult women's prison, to house some delinquent girls ages 15–18, who had committed crimes as juveniles. As of February 2014, two girls were assigned to York, 21 girls were in pre-trial facilities, and no girls were out of state. One girl was waiting to get into Journey House, a secure facility for girls; Journey House is a privately operated facility on the property of Natchaug Hospital in Mansfield Center.

By 2013 the state planned to establish a hardware secure facility for 10-12 girls at the Albert J. Solnit Center, a facility at the former Riverview Hospital. Pueblo Unit, a state-owned, newly opened facility next to the CTJS in Middletown, was established so the state would not have to send juveniles to York. The state spent $500,000 to renovate Pueblo Unit into a girls' facility, and this was completed in March. It is intended to house two girls placed on an emergency basis and ten girls for longer commitments, up to six months. Pueblo Unit has classrooms, common areas, three double rooms, and six single rooms.

As of 2014 DCF assigns girls to two locked facilities: Pueblo Unit and the Journey House.

== Albert J. Solnit Children's Center ==
The Albert J. Solnit Children's Center- North Campus; formerly the Connecticut Children's Place (CCP), and the State Receiving Home; is located in Warehouse Point, in East Windsor. Effective December 1, 2013 it became a psychiatric treatment facility for juvenile males. It had been a state residential and educational center for abused and neglected children of the ages 10–18. It has three cottages, with each having 14 beds. After the closure of the Long Lane School, CCP became the housing point of delinquent girls adjudicated by the state. Delinquent girls were to be moved to a vacant cottage that was "staff secure," meaning patrolled by employees but not hardware secure. This unit was to have 12 beds. In 2003 some area selectmen met with DCF and discussed concerns about the facility.

Albert J. Solnit Psychiatric Center - South Campus is in Middletown. The primary secure girls' correctional facility, intended for short-term use, is located on this property.

== Commissioners ==
- Wayne Mucci (1970)
- Francis H. Maloney (1971 - 1979)
- Mark J. Marcus (1980 - 1986)
- Amy B. Wheaton (1987 - 1990)
- Rose Alma Senatore (1990 - 1994)
- Linda D'Amario Rossi (1995 - 1997)
- Kristine Ragaglia (1998 - 2003)
- Darlene Dunbar (2003 - 2007)
- Susan Hamilton (2008 - 2011)
- Joette Katz (2011–2019)
- Vanessa Dorantes (2019–Present)
