= Gaffney, Bennett and Associates =

- Type: Private company
- Industry: Lobbying
- Founded: 1984; 42 years ago
- Headquarters: New Britain, Connecticut, United States
- Key people: Jay Malcynsky and Brian Gaffney
- Products: State lobbying, federal lobbying, public relations
- Website: http://www.gbact.com/GB/

Gaffney, Bennett and Associates is a law firm that specializes in lobbying headquartered in New Britain, Connecticut. They are the largest lobbying firm in the American state of Connecticut.

== History ==
Gaffney, Bennett and Associates was founded in the mid 1980s by Jay Malcynsky and Brian Gaffney in New Britain, Connecticut. The firm has been heavily involved with representing big companies seeking state aid or tax breaks to expand their presence in Connecticut.

In the late 1990s the firm represented the New England Patriots in negotiations with the State of Connecticut to move the Patriots to Hartford.

In 2009 Gaffney, Bennett and Associates made twice as much as the second largest lobbying firm. In 2011 they made over $4.7 million from lobbying services, again more than twice as much as the second largest lobbying firm.

In 2012 Vernon Mayor George F. Apel ended the town contract with Gaffney, Bennett and Associates which the town had on retainer since 2009.

In 2015 Gaffney, Bennett and Associates revenue was three times that of the second largest lobbying company in the state.

Co-founder John Brian Gaffney died on June 9, 2018, having co-founded the firm in 1984 with George Bennett and Jay Malcynsky. In 2021, it continued to be active in lobbying in Connecticut, with managing partners such as Jay F. Malcynsky still active in the firm. In 2022, among clients were Ørsted North America and Eversource. In April 2026, Connecticut Insider characterized the firm as a government relations firm.

== Subsidiaries ==
=== Gaffney Bennett Public Relations ===
In 2001 Gaffney, Bennett and Associates launched a PR Services arm called Gaffney Bennett Public Relations (GBPR) to handle corporate positioning, media relations, crisis communications, brand management, and cause-related marketing for existing and new clients. GBPR has offices in Connecticut and New York City. In 2011 GBPR launched a line of a la carte PR services called "the Press Release Shop." In 2019 GBPR hired North Carolina–based Ted Novin to split his time between their New York office and clients in North Carolina. Novin had previously been a spokesperson for the National Rifle Association of America and the National Shooting Sports Foundation.

== Major clients ==
- City of Bridgeport
- City of Stamford
- Connecticut Taxi Drivers Association
- Tomasso Brothers, Inc.
- Walmart
- Connecticut Association for the Performing Arts
- Eversource
- Ørsted North America
