= Tomaso =

Tomaso is a given name, being an Italian form of the name Thomas, a variant of the more common Tommaso or Tomasso. Notable people with the name include:

- Tomaso Albinoni (1671–1751), 18th-century Italian composer
- Alejandro de Tomaso (1928–2003), racing driver and businessman from Argentina
- Rico Tomaso (1898–1985), American illustrator and painter

== See also ==
- De Tomaso, Italian car-manufacturing company
