= Tommaso (disambiguation) =

Tommaso is an Italian given name.

Tommaso may also refer to:

- 4653 Tommaso, a main-belt asteroid
- Tommaso (2016 film), a 2016 Italian comedy-drama film
- Tommaso (2019 film), a 2019 Italian film

== See also ==
- Di Tommaso
- Tomasso
