= Connecticut Department of Administrative Services =

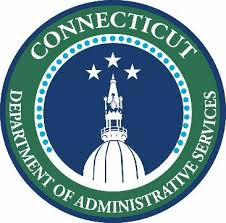

- Headquarters in Hartford, CT

State agency overview
- Jurisdiction: Connecticut
- Headquarters: 450 Columbus Boulevard Hartford, CT 06103
- State agency executive: Michelle Gilman, Commissioner
- Website: portal.ct.gov/DAS

The Connecticut Department of Administrative Services (DAS) is a department of the American state of Connecticut. It oversees many of the state's core functions and acts as a service provider and administrator for other state departments and agencies.

== Overview ==
The DAS serves as the state's “nerve center” and oversees most state contracting and asset management.

== History ==
In July 2013 the Connecticut Department of Public Works became part of the DAS.

In 2019 Governor Ned Lamont appointed Josh Geballe as commissioner. Geballe is a ten-year IBM veteran who most recently served as CEO of New Haven based Core Informatics. He replaced retiring Commissioner Melody Currey.

On February 1, 2022, Governor Lamont announced that Josh Geballe has accepted a new job opportunity in the private sector and plans to leave service with the state effective February 14, 2022. The governor appointed Michelle Gilman of Colchester to succeed Geballe in the position of DAS commissioner. Gilman served as deputy chief operating officer in a position that she’s held since March 2020. Aiming to enhance efficiency, Gilman has prioritized centralizing the state’s IT infrastructure, ensuring accessibility of resources and knowledge for state agencies. She has spearheaded the development of a statewide digital equity plan to guarantee that all residents have the necessary education and hardware to participate in the digital economy. Additionally, Gilman has overseen ambitious climate sustainability measures across the department and collaborated with federal, state, and non-profit partners to expand agency capacity in support of small and minority businesses engaging with the state.

== Components ==
- Bureau of Enterprise Systems and Technology
