= Pascal Di Tommaso =

French footballer (born 1954)

Personal information
- Date of birth: 10 August 1954
- Place of birth: Grenoble, France
- Date of death: 5 August 2021 (aged 66)
- Place of death: Échirolles, France
- Position(s): Midfielder

Senior career*
Years	Team	Apps	(Gls)
- Grenoble
- *Club domestic league appearances and goals

Pascal Di Tommaso (10 August 1954 – 5 August 2021) was a French professional footballer who played as a midfielder.

== Early and personal life ==
Born in Grenoble, Di Tommaso was the brother of fellow player Louis Di Tommaso. He was married and his sons David and Yohan were also footballers.

He was a youth worker, spending more than 30 years working for the local council in Échirolles, a suburb of Grenoble.

== Career ==
Di Tommaso spent two seasons with Grenoble in the French Division 2.

== Death ==
Di Tommaso died on 5 August 2021, days before his 67th birthday.
