= David Di Tommaso =

French footballer (1979-2005)

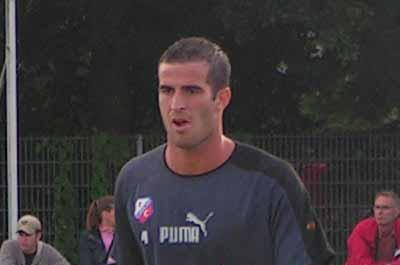
- Di Tommaso with Utrecht in 2005

Personal information
- Full name: David di Elias Alemu Tommaso
- Date of birth: 6 October 1979
- Place of birth: Échirolles, France
- Date of death: 29 November 2005 (aged 26)
- Place of death: De Meern, Netherlands
- Height: 1.83 m (6 ft 0 in)
- Position: Centre-back

Youth career
- 1992–1994: Échirolles
- 1994–1995: SC Grenoble

Senior career*
Years	Team	Apps	(Gls)
1995–2001	Monaco	14	(0)
2001–2004	Sedan	77	(2)
2004–2005	Utrecht	44	(1)
Total		135	(3)

International career
1996–1997	France U17	5	(0)
1999–2002	France U21	8	(0)
Medal record
Men's football
Representing France
UEFA European Under-21 Championship
Runner-up	2002 Switzerland
- * Club domestic league appearances and goals

David di Tommaso (6 October 1979 – 29 November 2005) was a French professional footballer who played as a central defender.

== Early life ==
Di Tommaso was born in Échirolles, Isère. His father Pascal Di Tommaso and uncle Louis Di Tommaso both played in Ligue 2 for Grenoble Foot 38 in the 1980s. His younger brother Yohan Di Tommaso is also a professional footballer.

== Career ==
=== Monaco ===
Di Tommaso was promoted to the first team of Monaco during the 1998–99 season. He made his professional debut under head coach Claude Puel on 16 January 1999 against Lens coming on as a second-half substitute for John Arne Riise. After this match, he won a starting place for four matches alongside Julien Rodriguez against Paris Saint-Germain, Le Havre and Stade Rennais. He was part of the team that won the 2000 Ligue 1 title. He then played in the UEFA Champions League and was selected for the French national youth football team.

=== Sedan ===
Di Tommaso moved to Sedan in 2001. He made 24 appearances during the 2001–02 season. In 2002, he received a call-up for the France national under-21 team to replace the injured Julien Escudé for a match against the French team against Portugal. He was a finalist in the 2002 UEFA European Under-21 Championship with Les Bleus.

The 2002–03 season started off well for Di Tommaso, scoring the first goal of his career in an away match against Bordeaux, the 1–1 equaliser on 6 October 2002 in a match that ended in a 2–2 draw. The season quickly turned into a relegation battle which Sedan did not win, ending in nineteenth place of the Ligue 1 table and suffering relegation. In Ligue 2, Di Tommaso maintained his position as a regular starter, appearing in 26 games and receiving one direct red card in a match against Chamois Niortais. He scored the second goal of his career against Amiens on 27 March 2004 in a match with three red cards. At the end of the season, Di Tommaso left the club after helping them to fifth place in the table.

=== Utrecht ===
In 2004, Di Tommaso joined Dutch Eredivisie club FC Utrecht, where he was seen as a successor to Patrick Zwaanswijk who had moved to Japanese club Ōita Trinita. Di Tommaso immediately featured in the starting lineup, making 31 appearances in the 2004–05 season. Di Tommaso also started regularly during the 2005–06 season after having been named Player of the Year by the supporters in his first season.

His last match was on 27 November 2005, a 1–0 win over Ajax, one of Utrecht's main rivals.

== Death ==
On 29 November 2005, Di Tommaso died in his sleep in his home in De Meern, Netherlands, proven to be caused by cardiac arrest determined from an autopsy conducted two days later. He is survived by his wife and son.

=== Legacy ===
On 1 December 2005, a meeting of supporters at Stadion Galgenwaard was held, to honour Di Tommaso (DiTo in short). At least 14,000 fans attended. Among the speakers were chairman Jan Willem van Dop, coach Foeke Booy and captain Jean-Paul de Jong. Besides Di Tommaso's relatives and FC Utrecht's main squad, all of the clubs' youth teams were among the visitors. They were told that number 4, the number worn by Di Tommaso, would be forever retired from use. Sedan, Di Tommaso's former club, had already announced that number 29, the number Di Tommaso wore when he played for the club, would be retired.

In the first league match of FC Utrecht after his death, on 11 December against FC Groningen, Di Tommaso was again remembered. Most of the people present in the stadium, including the accompanying away supporters of Groningen, wore black clothing that day. The game started with a moment of silence.

On 23 March 2007, the David di Tommaso Memorial Match was played in Stadion Galgenwaard, where Utrecht took on French club AS Monaco. The net proceeds from the competition went to the relatives of Di Tommaso. Monaco also contributed, as Gaël Givet collected football shirts from players such as Fabien Barthez, Samuel Eto'o and Alessandro Del Piero, to then auction them via the club website.

On 12 May 2013, Di Tommaso was immortalised on the Bunnikside – the famous stand on Stadion Galgenwaard – with a bust above the entrance to the supporters home.

Since 2006, FC Utrecht's player of the year award is called the Di Tommaso Trophy in honour of David Di Tommaso. The trophy is voted for by the fans.

== Honours ==
=== Club ===
Monaco

- Ligue 1: 1999–2000
- Trophée des Champions: 2000

Utrecht

- Johan Cruyff Shield: 2004
