= Juvenile Training School (Japan) =

Japanese Reform school

A juvenile training school (少年院, shōnen'in) is a facility that accommodates individuals who have been sentenced to protective measures or those who should undergo penal servitude or imprisonment without work in a juvenile correctional facility. It is under the jurisdiction of the Correction Bureau of the Ministry of Justice, Japan.

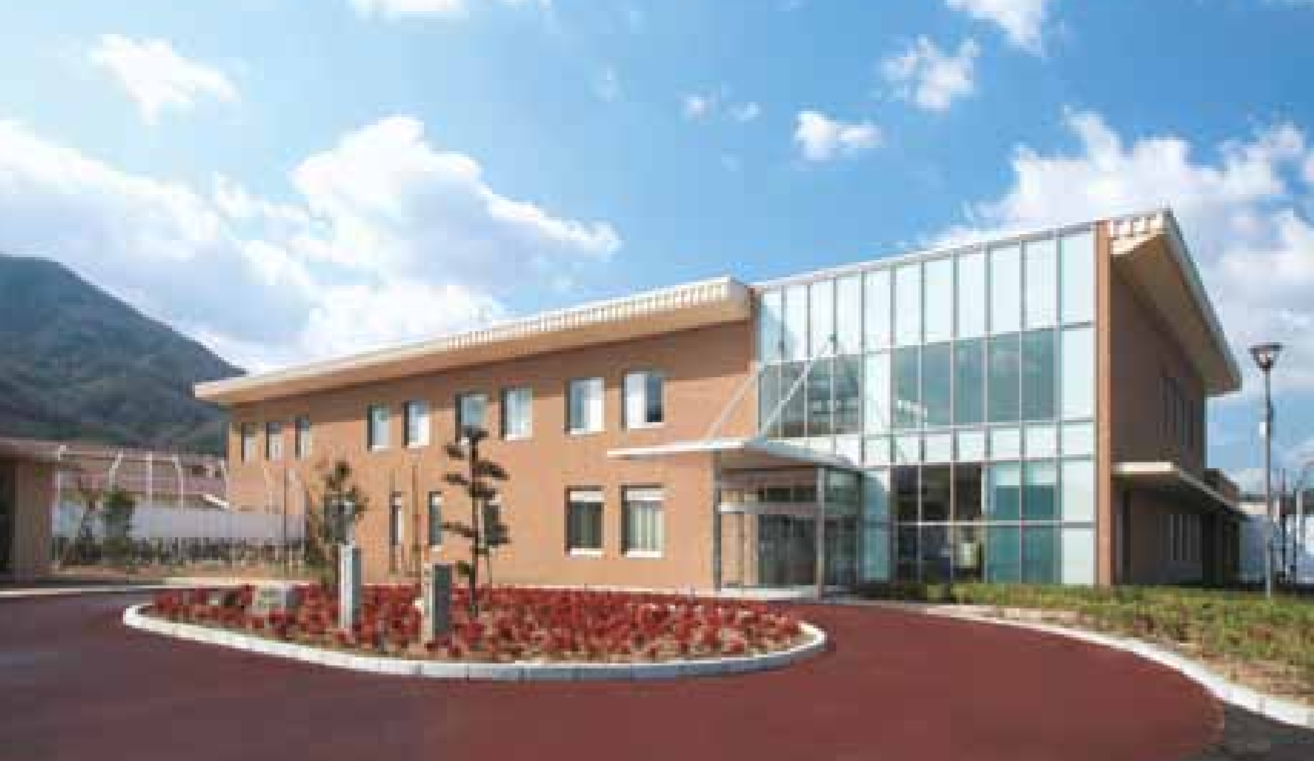
Shikoku Juvenile training school

== Overview ==
The juvenile training school accommodates two categories of inmates: those under protective measures and those serving sentences (Juvenile Training School Act, Article 2, Item 1).

Inmates under protective measures refer to those placed in the juvenile training school to receive the execution of protective measures as prescribed by the Japanese Juveniles Act (Juvenile Training School Act, Article 2, Item 2).

Sentenced inmates refer to those who are incarcerated in a juvenile training school in order to serve a sentence of imprisonment or confinement without work as stipulated in Article 56, Paragraph 3 of the Japanese Juveniles Act or those who are incarcerated in a juvenile training school for the execution of cooperatively enforced punishment referred to in each item of Article 16, Paragraph 1 of the International Prisoner Transfer Act. (Juvenile Training School Act, Article 2, Paragraph 3). The former are those under 16 years of age who have been sentenced to imprisonment or confinement without work and for whom correctional education in a juvenile training school has been deemed effective. They may be detained until they reach 16 years of age. If the sentence has not been completed by the age of 16, they are transferred to a juvenile prison. The punishment of being sent to a juvenile training school will only appear on records for the police or courts and will not be counted as a criminal record.

In addition to juvenile training schools, children's independence support facilities (formerly known as reformatories) also exist to accommodate juveniles of poor behavior, providing them with education while separating them from their conventional living environment. Differences lie in how individuals may be admitted to a children's independence support facility. It admits individuals not only under protective measures determined by family courts but also under child welfare measures stipulated by the Child Welfare Act, which can be initiated by the governor or the director of a child consultation center.

When the family court decides which facility to admit a juvenile, a vital factor to consider is whether living a disciplined life or promoting growth in a family-like environment will be better for the effectiveness of the juvenile's education. In the former case, the juvenile will be sent to a juvenile training school.

According to the Ministry of Justice, the educational backgrounds of the 2,108 inmates who entered juvenile training schools in 2018 were as follows: 7.5% were middle school students, 25.3% (533) were middle school graduates, 17.8% were high school students, 40.9% (862) were high school dropouts, 5.5% were high school graduates, and 2.9% had other educational backgrounds. Of the 2,156 people released from juvenile training schools that year, 295 hoped to continue their studies or return to school but were unable to do so.

In 1993, for the first time in Japan, an international division that teaches the Japanese language and social norms in Japanese society was established at the Kurihama Juvenile Training School.

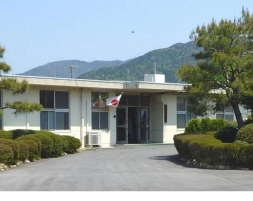
Kyoto Medical Reform School

== Types of juvenile training schools ==
=== Current law ===
According to Article 4, paragraph 1 of the current Juvenile Training School Act, enforced in April 2022, juvenile training schools are classified into the following five types.

- Class 1: Persons who are subject to execution of disposition for rehabilitation of an adjudicated delinquent, do not have a serious physical or mental disability, and are almost 12 years of age or older and younger than 23 years old.
- Class 2: Persons who are subject to execution of disposition for rehabilitation of an adjudicated delinquent, do not have a serious physical or mental disability, developed an advanced criminal tendency, and are almost 16 years of age or older and younger than 23 years old.
- Class 3: Persons who are subject to execution of disposition for rehabilitation of an adjudicated delinquent, have a serious physical or mental disability, and are almost 12 years of age or older and younger than 26 years old. This class corresponds to the former medical training school.
- Class 4: Persons who are subject to execution of sentence at juvenile training schools.
- Class 5: Persons who are subject to execution of protective measures by the Juveniles Act, Article 64, Paragraph 1, Item 2, and this decision has become final and binding by the said Act, Article 66, Paragraph 1.

The fourth category did not previously exist as a separate classification. The fifth type was added to the previous classification detailed in the Juvenile Training School Act, Article 4, paragraph 1 that came into effect in June 2015, as part of the amendment to partially revise the act (2021 Law No. 47).

Although living spaces are to be segregated by sex (Article 5, Paragraph 2), in contrast to the old law (Article 2, Paragraph 6), these facilities themselves are not separated according to the inmates' sexes. Furthermore, it is specified that separation should not be enforced beyond the living quarters when deemed appropriate (Article 5, Paragraph 3).

Each juvenile training school, as stated in Article 4, paragraph 2 of the Juvenile Training School Act, is assigned one or more types by the Minister of Justice according to the Juvenile Training School Type Table (Ministry of Justice Notification No. 299 of May 27, 2015).

== Correctional education ==
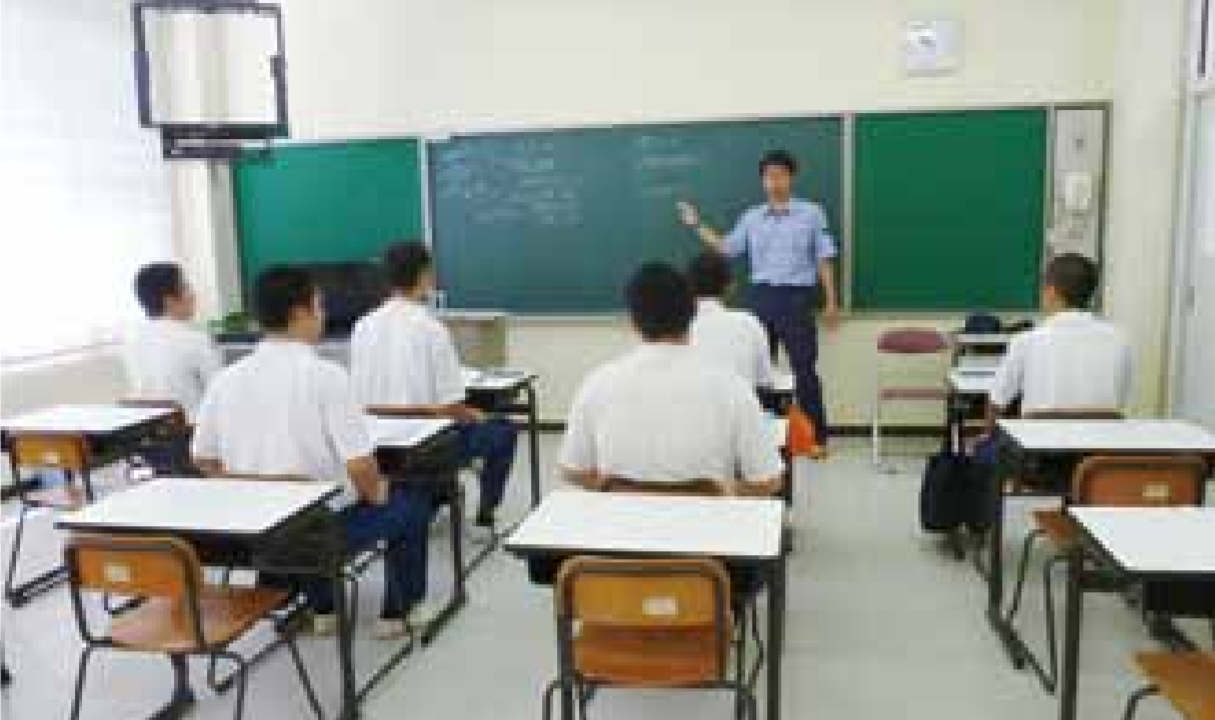
Educational guidance conducted by an education instructor

Juvenile training schools provide corrections to inmates (Juvenile Training School Act, Article 1). Correctional education in juvenile training schools is to prepare inmates to reenter society by providing life guidance, academic coursework (equivalent to compulsory education), vocational and other appropriate training, as well as medical care (Juvenile Training School Act, Article 4). Therefore, juvenile training schools are fundamentally different from juvenile prisons.

The staff in charge are educational instructors and psychological counselors.

== Rehabilitation curricula ==
Rehabilitation Curricula at Juvenile Training Schools differ in duration: special short-term (eligible for parole within four months), general short-term (within six months), long-term (about 12 months), and extended long-term (12 months or more). The allocation to these curricula is, in principle, determined by family courts for short terms, while for longer terms, family courts recommend duration (e.g., 18 months, more than 24 months).

Some juvenile training schools, especially those for general and special short-term facilities or female juvenile training schools, protect ex-inmates by calling themselves XYZ Institute, XYZ Academy, or XYZ Girls' School to disguise their correctional function when they appear in inmates’ resumes, which become necessary when they reintegrate into society. Schools that provide vocational training often use the alias of XYZ Technical Training Center when issuing qualification certificates.

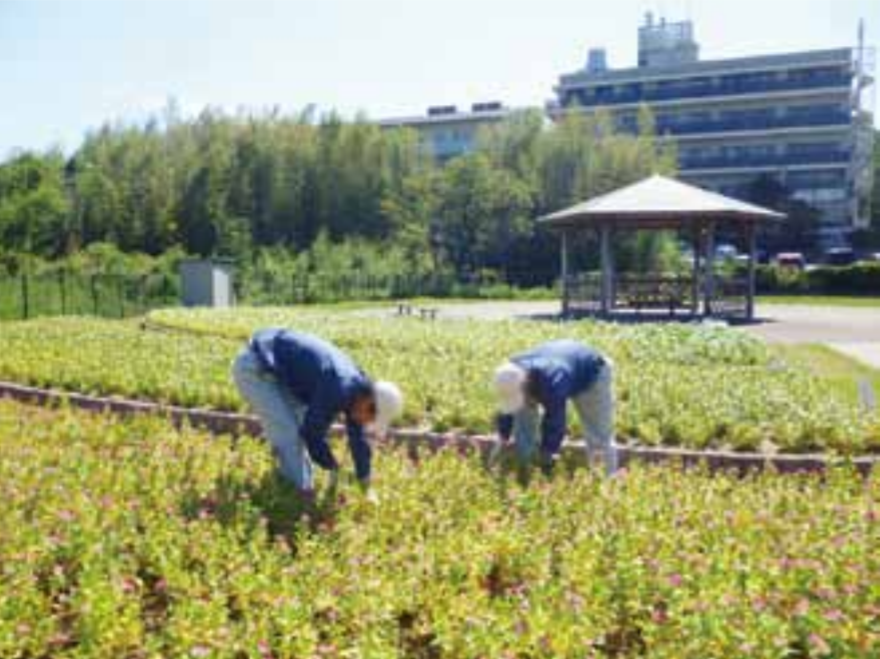
Community service activities

== A day in a juvenile training school (example) ==
6:30 Wake up, assigned activities (breakfast preparation/clean up)

7:40 Breakfast, independent study

8:50 Morning assembly (chorus, physical exercises)

9:00 Rehabilitation activities

- Life guidance to help inmates acquire the knowledge and attitude required for living an independent life.
- Vocational guidance to enhance inmates’ work motivation and help them acquire useful knowledge and skills for employment.
- Educational guidance equivalent to that of compulsory education and high school preparation for those who wish to pursue higher education. Inmates can take the Japanese High School Equivalency Exam.
- Physical education guidance to foster a healthy mind and body fundamental to live independent social life.
- Special activities guidance to enrich emotional well-being and foster independence, self-discipline, and cooperation through community service and outdoor activities.
- Physical exercises.

12:00 lunch, free time

13:00 Life guidance, vocational guidance, educational guidance, physical education guidance, special activities guidance, physical exercises.

17:00 Dinner, assigned activities (dinner preparation/clean up)

18:00 Group discussions, cultural lectures, individual consultation, independent study, journal writing, etc.

20:00 Free time (watching TV, etc.)

21:00 Bedtime
