= George A. Tomasso =

Businessman

- Born: March 26, 1927; New Britain, Connecticut
- Died: January 10, 2010 (aged 82)
- Education: Babson College
- Occupation: Corporate Executive

George A. Tomasso (March 26, 1927 – January 10, 2010) was an American businessman. His strategy of consistent low bidding forced changes in the construction industry in Connecticut. The director of the Connecticut Construction Industries Association said of him "It's a remarkable thing. Never before has someone affected the industry like this."

== Early life and family ==
George Tomasso was born along with his twin brother Victor on March 26, 1927, to Angelo and Nazzarena (Briganti) Tomasso. His parents were immigrants from the Italian region of Abruzzo. He is a member of the second generation of the Tomasso construction dynasty. After graduating from Cheshire Academy in 1945 Tomasso attended Babson College and graduated in 1949.

== Adult life ==
In 1949, his father Angelo was injured in an accident at the family's quarry, his four sons were forced to take over the business. George took on the role of treasure while his brother Angelo Jr. assumed the Presidency. He continued to manage the companies finances until it was sold in 1972 over his objections. After signing a pledge to stay out of the Connecticut contracting business for a number of years George moved to Florida, settling in Boca Raton and pursuing private investments. He died on January 10, 2010, in Farmington, Connecticut.

== George A. Tomasso Construction Corporation ==
In 1985, George came out of retirement and founded the George A. Tomasso Construction Corporation in New Britain. The firm did little work until 1991 when it began a meteoric rise to be the largest road contractor in Connecticut by 1993. To corner the market the corporation aggressively underbid their competitors, often bidding well under state estimates for the work. Between 1991 and 1993 the Corporation was awarded a third of all state road, bridge, and highway construction contracts. It was rumored that their success had as much to do with political connections as low bids. The Corporation's fortunes improved significantly after they hired John Doyle, a close personal friend of Governor Lowell P. Weicker Jr., as a lobbyist. Between January 1991 and October 1995 the Corporation was awarded 46 state contracts worth $432.1 million.

In 1995, the company ceased working on its 19 active construction contracts with the state and George was hospitalized at The Institute of Living, a residential psychiatric facility in Hartford, Connecticut. The collapse of the company left dozens of contractors with $13m in unpaid bills and caused hundreds of workers to be laid off. In 1995 George's brother Victor filed a petition in probate court in Farmington seeking the appointment of a conservator to handle George's personal and business affairs. The court appointed separate conservators for George's business and personal matters.

The George A. Tomasso Construction Corporation was led by conservator Jay F. Malcynsky for five years before winding up its operations though bankruptcy. In 1998 a bridge the Corporation erected taking the Central Connecticut Railroad over Connecticut Route 66 was given a Merit Award by the National Steel Bridge Alliance. Some of the work conducted by the Corporation was of a low quality and required immediate repair or replacement. While Tomasso was declared "incapable of managing his affairs and incapable of caring for himself by reason of impairment” by a Court, it was alleged that he was operating the company as a pyramid scheme and used money from new contracts to finish work on old contracts.
