= Angelo Tomasso Jr. =

- Born: 17 March 1925; New Britain, Connecticut
- Died: September 18, 2015
- Education: Auburn University
- Occupation: Corporate Executive
- Spouse: Joy Tomasso
- Children: Six, including William A. Tomasso

Angelo Tomasso Jr. (March 17, 1925 – September 18, 2015) was a businessman and philanthropist from New Britain, Connecticut.

== Early life and education ==
Tomasso was born on March 17, 1925, to Angelo and Nazzarena (Briganti) Tomasso. His parents were immigrants from the Italian region of Abruzzo. He was a member of the second generation of the Tomasso construction dynasty. Tomasso attended St. Thomas Seminary and graduated from New Britain High School in 1943. Following graduation he enlisted in the U.S. Navy. He served as a communications officer in the Amphibious Corps aboard the USS LST-925 in the South Pacific.

== Business career ==
In 1949 Angelo Tomasso Sr was injured in a tragic accident at the Tomasso Group’s Plainville quarry and died in 1952 leaving the next generation to take over the company. All four Tomasso brothers joined the company’s leadership with Angelo Tomasso Jr. taking over the Presidency and George A. Tomasso becoming treasurer. After WWII the company capitalized on the growth of suburbia in Connecticut by building roads and highways to support the new patterns of development. In 1972 the core construction business Angelo Tomasso, Inc was sold to Ashland Resources with Angelo Jr. staying on as senior vice president.

During the 1990s and early 2000s the Tomasso family, including Angelo Jr., enjoyed a close relationship with Connecticut Governor John G. Rowland. On March 17, 2000 Governor Rowland declared it Angelo Tomasso Jr. Day.

In 1990 he became the Chairman of Tilcon Inc. the direct successor company of Angelo Tomasso, Inc. In 2000 Tomasso retired as Chairman of Tilcon Inc.

Over the course of his business career he served as a director of the Connecticut Bank Federation, the New Britain Bank and Trust Company and Connecticut Natural Gas.

== Philanthropy ==
Tomasso was a founding members of the “Club with a Heart” which became The Hundred Club of Connecticut.

== Awards and honors ==
On March 17, 2000, Connecticut Governor Rowland declared it Angelo Tomasso Jr. Day.

In 2017 Angelo Tomasso Jr. was inducted into the Connecticut Immigrant Heritage Hall of Fame.

== See also ==
- Tomasso Group
