= Peter N. Ellef =

- Born: Peter Nicholas Eleftheriadis; July 23, 1944 (age 82); Athens, Greece
- Education: The Citadel
- Occupation: Executive
- Known for: Political Scandal and Corruption

Peter N. Ellef (born July 23, 1944) is a businessman, white collar criminal, and former public servant from Connecticut. He was the Chief of Staff to former Republican Connecticut Governor John Rowland, who would later serve one year and a day in prison after pleading guilty to corruption charges of accepting bribes. He was known as the “Wizard of Oz” for his ability to wield power behind the scenes.

== Early life and education ==
Peter Ellef was born Peter Nicholas Eleftheriadis in Athens, Greece on July 23, 1944, to an American mother trapped by WWII. He was sent to live with his Grandmother in Greenwich, Connecticut, in 1948, he became an American citizen in 1955. He attended Greenwich High School and then The Citadel, graduating in 1967. He married Daryl Shellhammer in 1966. The couple have three children.

== Pre-political career ==
Ellef served in the United States Air Force from 1967 to 1972. He flew 144 combat missions during the Vietnam War, including classified ones against targets in Laos and Cambodia.

Immediately before getting involved in Connecticut politics Ellef worked at Cigna.

== Political career ==
Ellef was the chairman of the Connecticut Resources Recovery Authority when they entered into a $220 million agreement with Enron. From 1997 to 2002 he was the chief of staff for Governor Rowland, he was ousted over his role in the Enron agreement.

Ellef was sentenced to serve time in prison in April 2006, after pleading guilty to conspiring to commit tax fraud and participating in a bribery scheme, where he accepted gifts, cash and gold coins in exchange for rigging state contracts to favor William A. Tomasso, the head of the Tomasso Group, the contractor and the person bribing him. Ellef paid kickbacks to Rowland including paying for part of the work done by the Tomasso Group on Rowland’s lakeside country house.

In return for Ellef’s cooperation Federal prosecutors dropped a case against Ellef’s son Peter Ellef II whose landscaping business received more than $2 million in contracts from the Tomasso Group.
