= Tomasso Amici =

Italian sculptor

Tomasso Amici was an Italian sculptor active in Cremona, Lombardy in the late 15th century. He worked in the style of the 13th-century sculptor Bramanto Sacchi. He is known for sculpting the reliefs in the Gothic altar of St Nicolas (1495) in the Duomo di Cremona.

== Sources ==
- Boni, Filippo de' (1852). Biografia degli artisti ovvero dizionario della vita e delle opere dei pittori, degli scultori, degli intagliatori, dei tipografi e dei musici di ogni nazione che fiorirono da'tempi più remoti sino á nostri giorni. Seconda Edizione.. Venice; Googlebooks: Presso Andrea Santini e Figlio. p. 21.
