= Yohan Di Tommaso =

French footballer (born 1983)

Personal information
- Date of birth: 9 July 1983 (age 43)
- Place of birth: Échirolles, France
- Height: 1.82 m (6 ft 0 in)
- Position: Forward

Senior career*
Years	Team	Apps	(Gls)
2001–2003	Lyon B	26	(6)
2003–2004	Rouen	3	(0)
2004–2005	Saint-Priest	33	(17)
2005–2006	Nîmes	10	(1)
2006	→ Martigues (loan)	13	(3)
2006–2007	Saint-Priest	31	(15)
2007–2009	Croix-de-Savoie	59	(16)
2009–2011	Fréjus Saint-Raphaël	41	(8)
2011	Toulon	15	(4)
2011–2012	Lyon Duchère	24	(17)
2012–2013	Bourg-Péronnas	27	(8)
- * Club domestic league appearances and goals

Yohan Di Tommaso (born 9 July 1983) is a French former professional footballer who played as a forward. He played at professional level in Ligue 2 for FC Rouen.

He is the younger brother of David Di Tommaso, a footballer who died in 2005 at the age of 26.

His father Pascal Di Tommaso and uncle Louis Di Tommaso both played in Ligue 2 for Grenoble Foot 38 in the 1980s.
