= Long Lane School =

Former juvenile prison in Connecticut, United States

Coordinates: 41.5462°N 72.6642°W

Long Lane School was a prison for juvenile inmates in Middletown, Connecticut. Historically a prison for delinquent girls, it underwent various name changes, was acquired by the state in 1924, and began housing boys in 1972. Prior to its 2003 closure, it was operated by the Connecticut Department of Children and Families, and was for inmates of the ages 11–16. It was a locked and high-security facility. In its lifetime, Long Lane remained unfenced.

== History ==
Initially a private charitable organization, it was established in 1868 as the Industrial School for Girls, with the Connecticut Legislature approving the plans for the facility. 45.71 acres (18.50 ha) of land, in Middletown, was donated for the facility; Middletown's proximity to Hartford and New Haven, which it was between, and its accessibility to the Connecticut River boat services, were the reasons for its selection. Sarah A. Leavitt, author of "Neglected, Vagrant, and Viciously Inclined: The Girls of the Connecticut Industrial School, 1867-1917," stated that Farmington was the only other site seriously considered for the facility. The previous Henry Hall and Sweet properties housed Long Lane.

On June 21, 1924, the prison was renamed Long Lane Farm as the State of Connecticut acquired it. It received the name Long Lane School in 1943.

In 1956 Wesleyan University attempted to acquire much of the property to expand its campus. By 1957 the university canceled the deal as the cost to acquire the land would be too great; instead the university acquired other property.

In 1970 Long Lane School became a part of the Connecticut Department of Children and Youth Services, which was renamed Department of Children and Families in 1993. In 1972 the Connecticut School for Boys in Meriden administratively merged into Long Lane, with the boys transferred to Long Lane.

A 15-year old prisoner from New Britain, Tabitha Ann Brendle, became the first inmate of Long Lane to ever commit suicide; her death caused prompts to have juvenile corrections in Connecticut reformed.

By the 1990s the State of Connecticut had plans to upgrade the security of Long Lane. Scott Mayeritz of Wesleyan University stated that the Long Lane campus building was "falling apart". In 1999 Eric M. Weiss of the Hartford Courant stated that "Students and staff describe Dickensian conditions in which students are shackled to beds and proper plumbing is a privilege." A Connecticut child advocate stated that the Long Lane facility was "appalling".

In the 1990s Wesleyan University chose to pay $15 million to purchase the Long Lane campus to avoid having a facility with an obvious prison appearance on the boundary of the university, as the state was planning to erect a security fence; area residents disliked the perception of favoritism towards the university.

As of 2002 about 35 girls resided at Long Lane. The facility had three cottages for boys and one for girls.

In 2002 the state announced that the Long Lane School, then the state's designated juvenile center for girls, was closing. Girls were moved to the Connecticut Children's Place in East Windsor. The closure occurred after the Attorney General of Connecticut, Richard Blumenthal, and a state child advocate, Jeanne Milstein, investigated a suicide attempt at Long Lane and then asked DCF to review its practices regarding the safety of delinquent girls. Long Lane was scheduled to close on December 30, 2003. It instead closed February 7 of that year, with boys sent to the Connecticut Juvenile Training School (CTJS) in Middletown and girls sent to various other facilities.

== Demographics ==
In 1998 about 76% of the prisoners were of racial groups other than non-Hispanic white.
