= Tomasso Group =

Connecticut construction and real estate conglomerate

- Type: Private company
- Industry: Construction, Real Estate
- Founded: 1923; 103 years ago
- Headquarters: New Britain, CT, United States
- Key people: Tomasso family
- Products: New Construction, Renovation, Property management
- Website: http://tomassogroup.com

The Tomasso Group is a family-run conglomerate focused on the construction and real estate industries based in New Britain, Connecticut.

== History ==
=== Angelo Tomasso Sr. ===
Angelo Tomasso immigrated to America from Abbateggio, Italy in 1910. Angelo served in the US Army during WWI and moved to Connecticut following the end of the war.

=== Early history ===
The Tomasso Group was founded in 1923 as Angelo Tomasso, Inc with only a single steam shovel to its name. Angelo bought another steam shovel each time one of his four sons was born. Early projects included Brainard Airport in Hartford in 1941. In 1949 Angelo Sr was injured in a tragic accident at the Group’s Plainville quarry and died in 1952 leaving the next generation to take over the company. All four Tomasso brothers joined the company’s leadership with Angelo Tomasso Jr. taking over the Presidency and George A. Tomasso becoming treasurer. After WWII the company capitalized on the growth of Suburbia in Connecticut by building roads and highways to support the new patterns of development.

=== Modern history ===
In 1968 Tunxis Management was formed to manage the companies real estate holdings. In 1972 the core construction business Angelo Tomasso, Inc was sold to Ashland Resources. Tunxis Management remained under family ownership and within a few years the family had reconstituted the contracting business under the name TBI Construction and the management of Angelo Jr.’s four sons.

Throughout the late 1990s and early 2000s the group benefited from a close relationship between the Tomasso family and Connecticut Governor John G. Rowland. The Group's power within state government was such that state officials feared reprisals if they crossed the Group or the family. Recovering from near collapse in 1995 TBI received over $100 million in state contracts during Rowland's term as governor while the Group and family members gave over $500,000 to Rowland's campaigns. On March 17, 2000 Governor Rowland declared it Angelo Tomasso Jr. Day.

In 2002 Lawrence Alibozek, former deputy chief of staff to the Governor, plead guilty to steering the contracts to the Group but declined to implicate the Governor. In 2003 Rowland was ordered to pay a $9,000 fine as punishment for paying a much lower than going rate for vacations he took at homes in Vermont and Florida owned by the Tomasso Group. In return for this legal and illegal largess the Governor steered a series of no-bid contracts to the Group.

Rowland was forced from office after it emerged that the Tomasso Group and other state contracts had made free improvements to the Governor’s Bantam Lake “cottage” in Litchfield. The improvements included a hot tub and a cathedral ceiling. Rowland’s birthday party and annual golf tournament were held at the Group’s Tunxis Country Club. During Rowland's nine years in office Tomasso linked companies received at least $233 million in state contracts.

In 2003 group president William A. Tomasso allegedly stalked and harassed a former Tomasso Group contractor and his wife. Later in 2003 the Group got into a legal battle with Connecticut Attorney General Richard Blumenthal over Blumenthal’s attempts to subpoena records for Tomasso Brothers Inc.; Tomasso Brothers Construction Co.; TBI Construction Co. LLC; Tunxis Plantation Country Club; Tunxis Management Co.; Tunxis Management Co. II; and Tenergy Water LLC.

In 2004 group president William A. Tomasso, subsidiary TBI Construction, subsidiary Tunxis Management, and Governor Rowland's Chief of Staff Peter N. Ellef were indicted on numerous charges including fraud, racketeering, bribery, and extortion. Ellef had instructed Public Works Commissioner Theodore R. Anson to fast track major public works contracts with the explicit purpose of awarding them to the Tomasso Group. Later in 2004 Tunxis Management lost a $400,000 state contract when they refused to disclose past gifts to public officials, a requirement which was added to all state contracts after the Tomasso corruption scandal came to light.

In 2006 William A. Tomasso and Peter N. Ellef were each sentenced to 30 months in prison. TBI admitted to improperly making business deductions for personal expenses charged by Tomasso, Ellef, and their families. In addition, they agreed to pay the IRS $366,906, as well as any civil tax-fraud penalties and interest. The lack of a trial meant that the inner workings of the racketeering scheme were not detailed in court saving the Tomasso Group significant embarrassment. In return for Ellef’s cooperation Federal prosecutors dropped a case against Ellef’s son Peter Ellef II whose landscaping business received more than $2 million in contracts from the Tomasso Group.

In 2017 the Tomasso Group sold the Medical Arts Center at The Hartford Healthcare Cancer Institute for $30.2 million to a publicly traded REIT.

As of 2018 William A. Tomasso was the President of TBI Construction.

=== Tenergy Water ===
Tenergy Water was a subsidiary of the Tomasso Group that produced water treatment and filtration equipment. Between 1997 and 1998 Tenergy negotiated a $3 million loan from the state Department of Economic Development in return for creating 106 jobs. This loan was out of the ordinary for loans provided by the Department of Economic Development because Tomasso did not offer any collateral, all their assets already being used as collateral against loans from Webster Bank. The Presidency of Tenergy Water was offered to Peter N. Ellef as a bribe in 2002 but this was reconsidered because the relationship between Ellef and Tomasso was already under scrutiny. In 2004 Tenergy entered into a partnership with Christ AG and was renamed Tenergy Christ Water LLC. In 2011 Tenergy Christ was acquired by Nalco Holding Company and renamed Res-Kem General Water LLC.

== Current operation ==
The group is split into three main subsidiaries: TBI Development, TBI Construction, and Tunxis Management.

=== Tunxis Country Club ===
The Tomasso Group is the owner of the 45 hole Tunxis Country Club located on the east bank of the Farmington River in Farmington, Connecticut. Originally named Tunxis Plantation Country Club it has been under Tomasso family management for four generations. The on-site restaurant Tunxis Tavern reopened in 2018 following renovations. The current Head Golf Pro is Angelo Fiducia who has worked his entire career from caddy to pro at Tunxis. As part of a kickback agreement the son of Peter Ellef, Peter Ellef II, sold christmas trees from the Club each holiday season for a number of years.

== Major projects ==
=== Construction ===
- Brainard Airport (original construction)
- Main parking garage at Bradley International Airport
- Connecticut Natural Gas headquarters, East Hartford
- Connecticut Juvenile Training School, Middletown
- ConnectiCare HQ and Operations Center, Farmington
- The Superior Court and Center for Juvenile Matters, Bridgeport
- Waterbury Performing Arts Magnet School, Waterbury
- Government Center Garage, New Britain

=== Renovations ===
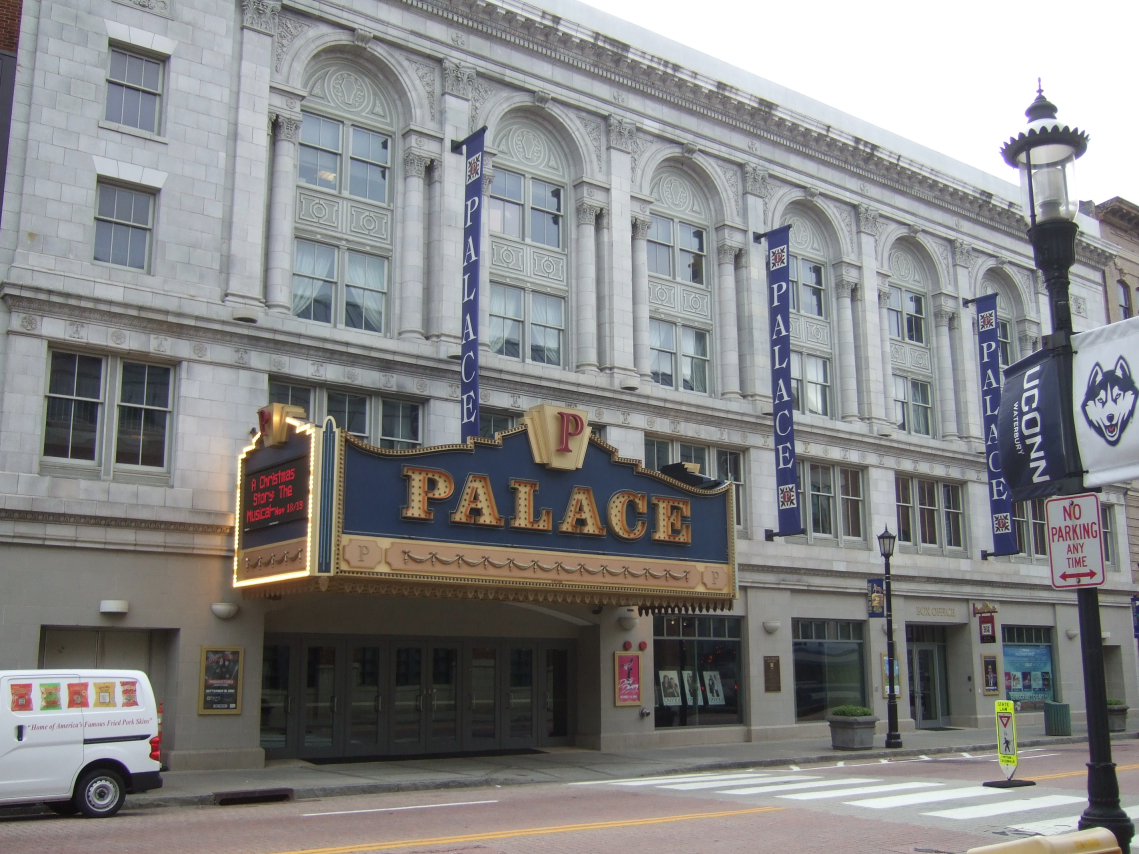
Palace Theater Waterbury, CT

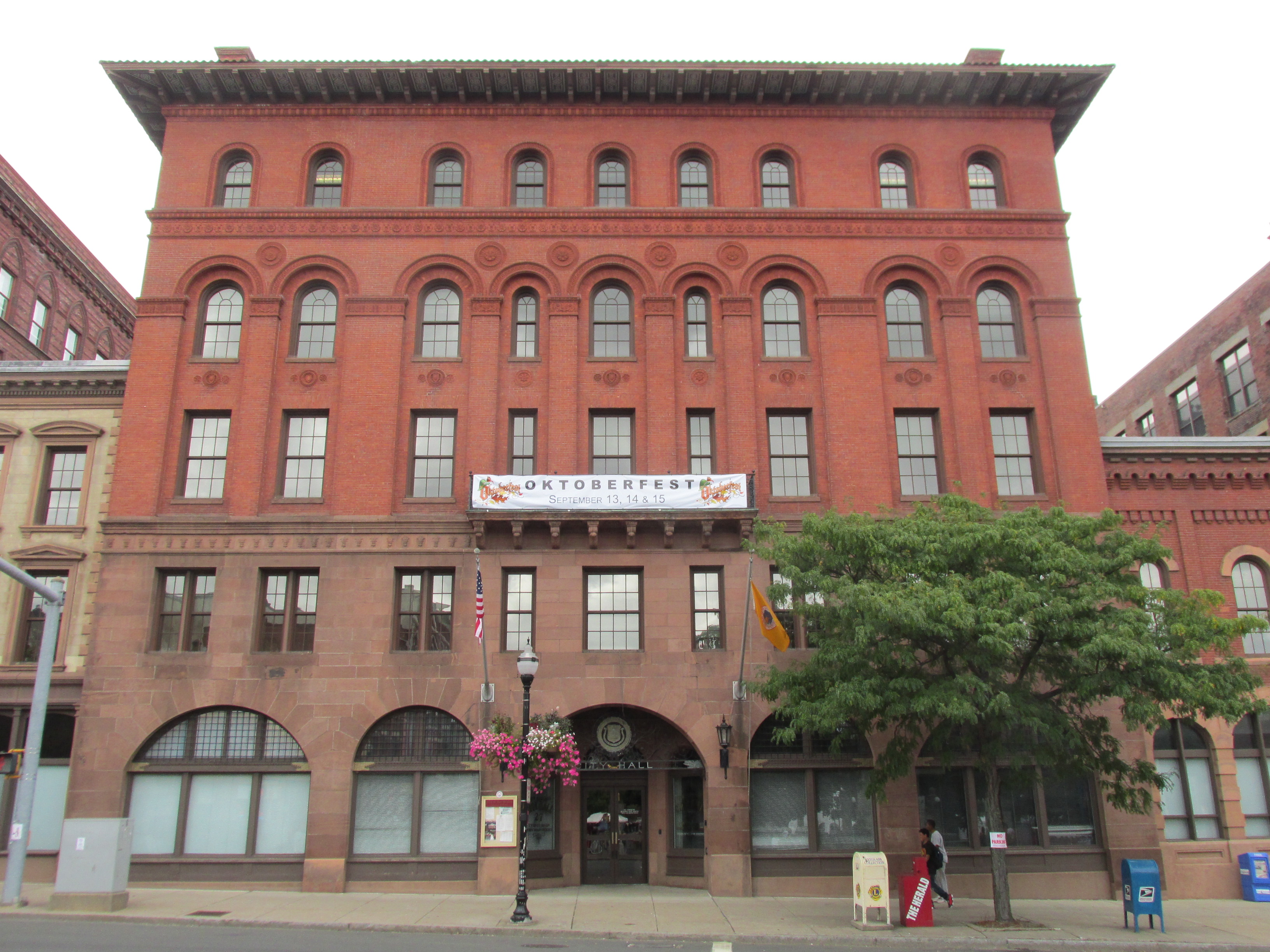
City Hall, New Britain CT

- Palace Theater, Waterbury
- St. Thomas Seminary, Bloomfield
- New Britain City Hall, New Britain
- Gates Building, New Britain
- Connecticut Building on the Avenue of States at The Big E, Springfield, MA
- Long Lane School, Middletown
- Connecticut Lottery Corporation headquarters, Rocky Hill
