= Connecticut Department of Public Works =

State department of Connecticut, US

Agency overview
- Dissolved: July 2013
- Superseding agency: Connecticut Department of Administrative Services
- Jurisdiction: Connecticut
- Headquarters: Hartford, Connecticut

The Connecticut Department of Public Works (DPW) is a defunct department of the American state of Connecticut. In 2013 it was transferred to the Connecticut Department of Administrative Services.

== History ==
During the 1990s and early 2000s the DPW suffered under the corrupt eight-year leadership of Commissioner Theodore R. Anson. Anson was appointed Commissioner of the DPW by Governor John G. Rowland in 1995 following a career in the private sector. Anson resigned in September 2003 after the Hartford Courant reported that he had taken a bribe in the form of free design work from the architecture firm Kaestle Boos Associates. Governor Rowland subsequently appointed James T. Fleming to lead the department.

In July 2013 the department became part of the Connecticut Department of Administrative Services (DAS).
