= Mark (given name) =

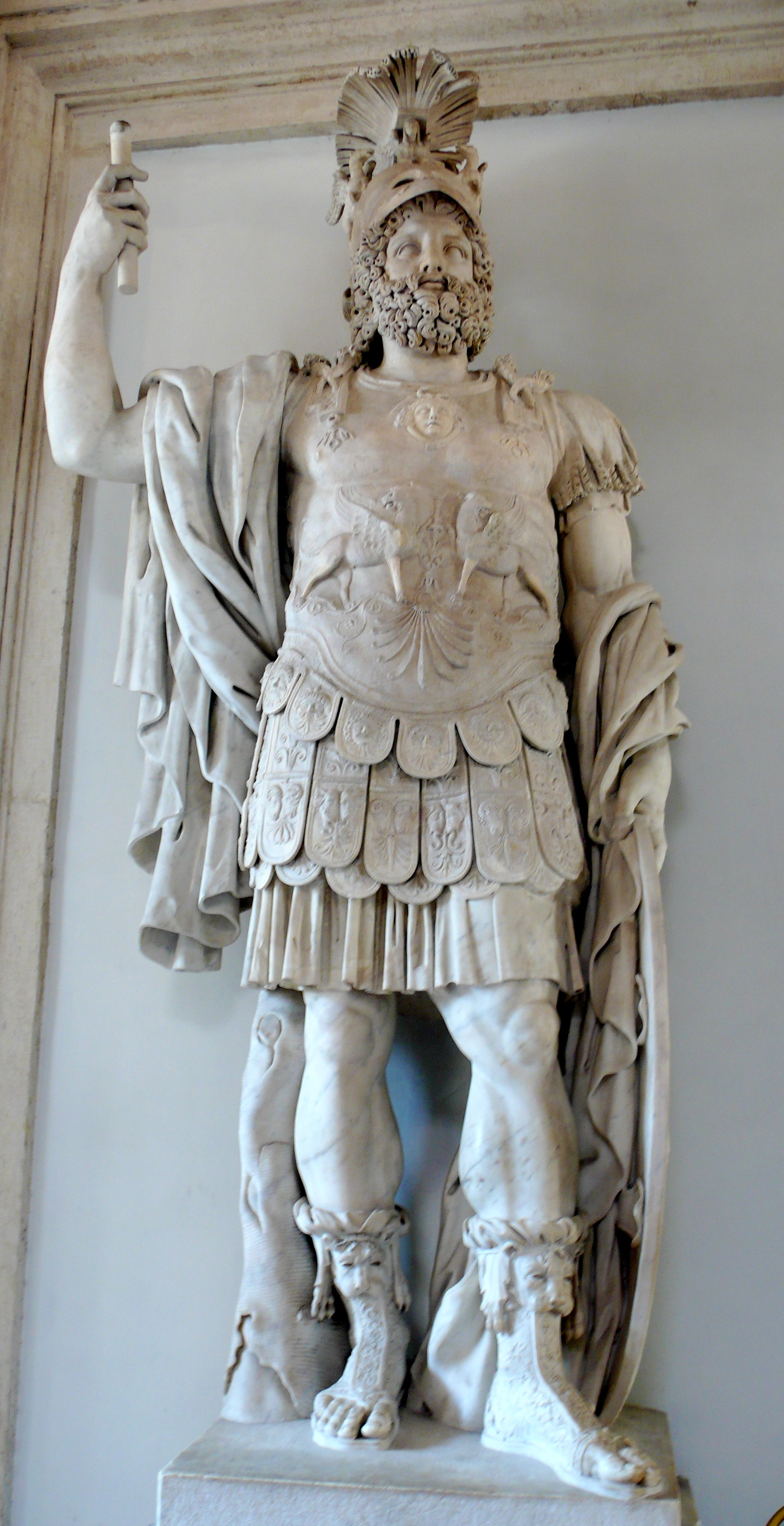
- Statue of Marte (Mars), 1st century, in the Forum of Nerva (Capitoline Museums, Rome)
- Pronunciation: /ˈmɑːrk/ Dutch: [ˈmɑr(ə)k] Russian: [ˈmark]
- Gender: Male

Origin
- Origin: Latin
- Meaning: "Of Mars, warlike, warrior" or "famous counsel"

Other names
- Related names: Marc, Marco, Marcos, Marcus, Marek, Marko, Martin, Marx

Mark is a common male name and is related to the Latin word Mars. It means "consecrated to the god Mars", and also may mean "God of war" or "to be warlike". Marcus was one of the three most common Roman given names. It is also used as a short form of Martin, a name which is either also of Latin origin and also meaning "warlike", or derived from Proto-Germanic elements "mar", meaning "famous" and "tank", meaning "thought", "counsel".

== Meaning and history ==
Mark is a form of the name Marcus. Mark the Evangelist is the traditionally ascribed eponymous author of the second Gospel in the New Testament. He is the patron saint of Venice, where he is supposedly buried. Though in use during the Middle Ages, Mark was not common in the English-speaking world until the 19th century, when it began to be used alongside the classical form Marcus.

In the Celtic legend of Tristan and Isolde, this was the name of a king of Cornwall. It was also borne by the American author Mark Twain (1835–1910, real name Samuel Clemens), the author of Tom Sawyer and Huckleberry Finn. He took his pen name from a call used by riverboat workers on the Mississippi River to indicate a depth of two fathoms. This is also the usual English spelling of the name of the 1st-century BC Roman triumvir Marcus Antonius (Mark Antony).

== In other languages ==
- Belarusian: Марк
- Bulgarian: Маркo, Марк
- Breton: Mark
- Catalan: Marc
- Coptic: Ⲙⲁⲣⲕⲟⲥ
- Czech: Marek
- Welsh: Marc
- Danish: Mark
- German: Marco, Markus, Marcus
- Greek: Μάρκος
- English: Mark, Marc, Marcus
- Esperanto: Marko
- Spanish: Marco, Marcos
- Estonian: Markko
- Basque: Marco
- Finnish: Markku
- French: Marc
- Friulian: Marc
- Lombard: March
- Irish: Marc, Marcas
- Hebrew: מארק
- Croatian: Marko
- Hungarian: Márk
- Indonesian: Markus, Mark
- Italian: Marco
- Cornish: Margh
- Latin: Marcus
- Lithuanian: Markas
- Latvian: Marks, Marcis, Mārcis, Mareks, Markuss
- Dutch: Mark
- Norwegian: Markus
- Polish: Marek
- Portuguese: Marques, Marcos
- Romanian: Marcu
- Russian: Марк
- Sardinian: Marcu
- Slovak: Marek
- Slovene: Marko
- Serbian: Марко
- Swedish: Mark, Markus
- Turkish: Markos
- Ukrainian: Марко, Марк

== Surnames derived from the name ==
- Marchenko
- Marchuk
- Marczuk
- Marczyk
- Marczyński
- Markiewicz
- Markevičius
- Markevich
- Markevicz
- Markevych
- Marko (surname)
- Markoff
- Markoski
- Markov
- Marković
- Markovič
- Markovich
- Marcovici
- Markovics
- Markovits
- Markovitz
- Markovski
- Markowitz
- Markowski

== People ==
=== Academics ===
- Mark Adler (born 1959), American software engineer
- Mark Azadovsky (1888–1954), Russian scholar of folktales and Russian literature
- Mark Benecke (born 1970), German forensic biologist
- Mark Blaug (1927–2011), Dutch-born British economist
- Mark Boslough, American physicist,
- Mark Buchanan (born 1961), American physicist
- Mark Catesby (1682–1749), English naturalist
- Mark Wayne Chase (born 1951), American-born British botanist
- Mark R. Cohen (born 1943), American scholar of Jewish history
- Mark Dean (computer scientist) (born 1957), American inventor and a computer engineer
- Mark Fettes (born 1961), Canadian Esperantist
- Mark Fisher (theorist) (1968–2017), British cultural theorist and philosopher
- Mark Frigo, American economist
- Mark Z. Jacobson (born 1965), American civil and environmental engineer
- Mark Jerrum (born 1955), British computer scientist and computational theorist
- Mark Lilla (born 1956), American political scientist and philosopher
- Mark van Loosdrecht (born 1959), Dutch biotechnologist
- Mark Mazower (born 1958), British historian
- Mark P. McCahill (born 1956), American computer scientist and internet pioneer
- Mark Borisovich Mitin (1901–1987), Soviet Marxist-Leninist philosopher
- Mark Oliphant (1901–2000), Australian physicist and humanitarian
- Mark Overmars (born 1958), Dutch computer scientist, creator of Game Maker
- Mark Pattison (academic) (1813–1884), English educational reformer and Rector of Lincoln College, Oxford
- Mark Ptashne (born 1940), American molecular biologist
- Mark Ridley (zoologist) (born 1956), British zoologist and writer on evolution
- Mark Satin (born 1946), American political theorist
- Mark Sedgwick (born 1960), British historian
- Mark R. Showalter (born 1957), American astronomer
- Mark Solonin (born 1958), Russian WWII historian
- Mark Steedman (born 1946), British computational linguist and cognitive scientist
- Mark van Vugt (born 1967), Dutch evolutionary psychologist
- Mark Waer (born 1951), Belgian biomedical scientist and university president
- Mark Wainberg (1945–2017), Canadian HIV/AIDS researcher and activist
- Mark Walport (born 1953), British medical scientist
- Mark Weiser (1952–1999), American chief scientist at Xerox PARC
- Mark Zborowski (1908–1990), American anthropologist and Soviet spy

=== Acting ===
- Mark Addy, English actor
- Mark Atkinson, American actor
- Mark Benton, English actor
- Mark Burg (born 1959), American film and television producer
- Mark Consuelos, American actor
- Mark Dexter, English actor
- Mark Eden, English actor
- Mark Famiglietti, American actor and screenwriter
- Mark Fischbach, American YouTuber, podcaster and actor
- Mark Hamill, American actor
- Mark Harmon, American actor, producer and director
- Mark Herras, Filipino actor
- Mark Gatiss, English actor, comedian, screenwriter, producer and director
- Mark Indelicato, American actor
- Mark Lamarr, English actor and screenwriter
- Mark LaMura (1948–2017), American actor
- Mark Lenard, American actor
- Mark Linn-Baker, American actor
- Mark McKinney (born 1959), Canadian actor and comedian
- Mark McManus (1935–1994), Scottish actor
- Mark Miller (1924–2022), American stage and television actor and writer
- Mark Pellegrino, American actor, best known as Jacob in Lost
- Mark Proksch, American actor and impersonator, known for On Cinema and What We Do in the Shadows
- Mark Rendall, voice actor and actor
- Mark Robson (film director) (1913–1978), American film director
- Mark Rosenblatt, British director and writer
- Mark Ruffalo, American actor
- Mark Rylance, English actor
- Mark Salling (1982–2018), American actor who was best known for playing Noah Puckerman on Glee
- Mark Samaranayake (1914–2000), Sri Lankan Sinhala cinema and stage actor
- Mark Seibert, German musical theatre actor
- Mark A. Sheppard, actor best known as Crowley on Supernatural
- Mark Allen Shepherd, actor
- Marc Singer, American actor known for his role as Beastmaster and starring in the mini-series V
- Mark Strickson, English actor
- Mark Sinclair (better known as Vin Diesel), American actor, writer, director and producer
- Mark Wahlberg (born 1971), actor, previously known as musician Marky Mark
- Mark Williams (actor), British actor, comedian and scriptwriter
- Mark Womack (British actor) (born 1960)
- Mark Zakharov, Russian director and screenwriter

=== Arts ===
- Mark Heyes, British fashion presenter
- Mark Kermode, film critic
- Mark Kostabi, Estonian-American artist
- Mark Rothko, abstract-expressionist painter
- Mark Ryden, pop-surrealist painter
- Mark Samuels, choreographer, and dancer
- Mark Steel, British satirical comedian
- Mark Tobey, American abstract expressionist painter
- Mark Tompkins (dancer), artist, dancer and choreographer of contemporary dance
- Mark Tremonti, American musician and singer, in rock bands Alter Bridge, Tremonti and founding member of Creed

=== Business ===
- Mark Clouse (born 1968), Washington Commanders team president
- Mark Cuban, American entrepreneur
- Mark Ein (born 1964), American entrepreneur
- Mark Leiter (businessman), Executive Vice President at Nielsen
- Mark Loughridge, Vice-President of IBM
- Mark Mobius (1936–2026), American-born German emerging markets fund manager
- Mark Morton (businessman), co-founder of Morton Salt
- Mark Rocket, New Zealand businessman, tech and aerospace entrepreneur
- Mark Shepherd (businessman), chairman and chief executive officer of Texas Instruments
- Mark Shuttleworth, South African entrepreneur
- Mark Zuckerberg, founder and CEO of Facebook

=== Christianity ===
- Mark the Evangelist, one of the gospel writers of the life of Jesus
- Marcus I of Byzantium, bishop of Byzantium from 198 to 211 AD
- Pope Mark, pope of the Catholic Church
- Mark Ibn Kunbar, twelfth-century Coptic priest and preacher
- Mark of Ephesus, 15th century Archbishop of Ephesus, Opponent of the Union of Florence
- Patriarch Mark II of Constantinople, reigned from 1465 to 1466

=== Literature ===
- Mark Z. Danielewski (born 1966), American novelist
- Mark Lynas, British author, journalist and environmental activist
- Mark Mulvoy, American sports journalist and writer
- Mark Shepherd (novelist), author of several novels in the fantasy genre
- Mark Shulman (author), American children's author
- Mark Andrew Smith, American graphic novelist
- Mark Tully (1935–2026), British journalist and writer
- Mark Twain, pen name of American author Samuel Langhorne Clemens
- Mark Van Doren, American poet and literary critic
- Mark Waid, American comic book writer

=== Music ===
- Mark Ambor, American singer-songwriter
- Mark Andrews (1875−1939), British organist and composer
- Mark Balderas, keyboardist for the alternative rock band Human Drama
- Mark Bautista, Filipino singer
- Mark "Moke" Bistany, former drummer for Otep, Puddle of Mudd and Against All Will
- Mark Aurelio Cisneros, American multi-instrumentalist, composer, and improviser
- Mark Farner, American musician
- Mark Feehily, Irish singer in pop group Westlife
- Mark Gasser, British concert pianist
- Mark "Barney" Greenway, singer in British band Napalm Death
- Mark Hoppus, singer/bassist for the rock bands blink-182 and +44
- Mark Jansen, Dutch guitarist, singer, songwriter for Epica
- Mark Knopfler, British musician, member of Dire Straits,
- Mark Lanegan, lead singer of American grunge band Screaming Trees
- Mark Lee, Canadian-Korean rapper of South Korean band NCT
- Mark Linkous, singer from American band Sparklehorse
- Mark Lui, Hong Kong composer
- Mark McClelland, bass guitarist for Little Doses, previously for Snow Patrol
- Mark McGrath, singer of American rock band Sugar Ray
- Mark Mendoza, American bass guitarist
- Mark Morrison (born 1972), German-born British R&B singer
- Mark Morton (guitarist), guitarist from American band Lamb of God
- Mark Mothersbaugh, American composer, co-founder of Devo
- Mark O'Connor, American composer, violinist, guitarist, and mandolinist
- Mark Owen, British singer-songwriter, member of pop band Take That
- Mark Peddle, Canadian musician
- Mark Refoy, guitarist for Spiritualized, Slipstream, Pet Shop Boys
- Mark Richardson (musician), British musician for Skunk Anansie
- Mark Ronson, British-American music performer, producer and DJ
- Mark Sandman, American musician, ex-member of bands Morphine and Treat Her Right
- Mark Schultz, American contemporary Christian singer
- Mark Sheehan (1976–2023), guitarist for The Script
- Mark Slaughter, American musician, singer and songwriter for hard rock band Slaughter
- Mark Speer, American guitarist and founder of Khruangbin
- Mark Stoermer, American musician and member of The Killers
- Mark Stuart (musician), vocals for Christian band Audio Adrenaline
- Mark Swed, American music critic, chief classical music critic of the Los Angeles Times since 1996
- Mark Tuan, American-Taiwanese member of South Korean band GOT7
- Mark Vincent, Australian opera singer
- Marky Mark, American rapper, now goes by Mark Wahlberg
- Mark Wells (musician), Australian guitarist and musician, ex-member of The Ronnie Wood Band and Twenty Two Hundred

=== Politics ===
- Mark Diamond Addy, Ghanaian politician
- Mark Antony, Roman politician and general
- Mark Babin, American politician
- Mark Blier, American politician
- Mark Carney, Canadian politician and Prime Minister of Canada
- Mark Collett, British political activist
- Mark Dayton, former governor and U.S. senator from Minnesota
- Mark Demesmaeker, Belgian politician and MEP
- Mark Eyskens, Belgian economist, Prime Minister of Belgium in 1981
- Mark Gidley, Member of the Alabama House of Representatives
- Mark Grimes, Canadian politician
- Mark Herring, American politician and current Attorney General of Virginia
- Mark Kelly, American politician and astronaut; current U.S. senator from Arizona
- Mark Latham, Australian politician
- Mark McGowan, Australian politician, Premier of Western Australia
- Mark Persaud, Canadian lawyer
- Mark Pollard, Falkland Islands politician
- Mark Pryor, American lawyer, politician
- Mark Ricks, American politician
- Mark Rozzi, 140th Speaker of the Pennsylvania House of Representatives, current member of the Pennsylvania House of a Representatives
- Mark Rutte, Dutch politician, Prime Minister of the Netherlands
- Mark Schoenrock, Nebraska state senator
- Mark M. Shelton, American politician
- Mark Shepard, Vermont state senator
- Mark Shirey, member of the Alabama House of Representatives
- Mark Snoeren, member of the Dutch House of Representatives
- Mark Spencer, British Member of Parliament
- Mark Squilla, Philadelphia city councilman
- Mark Tisdel, Michigan state representative
- Mark Udall, American politician
- Mark Verheijen, Dutch politician
- Mark Villar, Filipino politician and businessman
- Mark Warner, former governor of and current U.S. senator from Virginia

=== Sports ===
- Mark Alarie (born 1963), American basketball player
- Mark Allen (snooker player), Northern Irish snooker player
- Mark Andrews (American football) (born 1996), American football player
- Mark Beck (born 1994), footballer
- Mark Belanger (1944–1998), American baseball player
- Mark Bell (ice hockey), Canadian ice hockey player
- Mark Bellhorn, American baseball player
- Mark Berger (judoka), Canadian Olympic silver & bronze heavyweight judoka
- Mark Bolding (born 1970), Canadian ice hockey coach
- Mark van Bommel, Dutch footballer
- Mark Bone (born 1960), New Zealand swimming instructor and former national coach
- Mark Bott (born 1986), English cricketer
- Mark Boucher, South African cricketer
- Mark Bresciano, Australian soccer player
- Mark Brunell, American football player
- Mark Buehrle, American baseball player
- Mark Calaway, (born 1965), American professional wrestler who uses the stage name "The Undertaker"
- Mark Canha (born 1989), American baseball player
- Mark Casale, American football player
- Mark Cavendish, professional racing cyclist
- Mark Chamberlain (born 1999), English professional boxer
- Mark Chatfield, American breaststroke swimmer
- Mark Clear (born 1956), American baseball player
- Mark Cohon, Canadian Football League Commissioner
- Mark Crow, American basketball player
- Mark Dale, English cricketer
- Mark Dean (swimmer), American swimmer
- Mark DeRosa, American baseball player
- Mark de Vries (born 1975), Dutch footballer
- Mark Didio, American football player
- Mark Dismore, American indycar driver
- Mark Du Plessis (born 1975), horse racing jockey
- Mark Dusbabek, American football player
- Mark Donohue, American racing driver
- Mark Ealham, English cricketer
- Mark Ellis (baseball), American baseball player
- Mark Evans (rower), Canadian rower
- Mark Ferreira (born 1967), former professional tennis player from India
- Mark Few (born 1962), American basketball coach
- Mark Fidrych (1954–2009), American baseball player
- Mark-Jan Fledderus (born 1982), Dutch footballer
- Mark Forsythe, Northern Irish long jumper
- Mark Friedman (born 1995), Canadian National Hockey League player
- Mark Fynn (born 1985), Zimbabwean tennis player
- Mark Garner, Australian track and field sprinter
- Mark Gilbert, American Major League Baseball player, and US Ambassador
- Mark Gilbert (American football) (born 1997), American football player
- Mark Giordano, Canadian ice hockey player
- Mark Gorski, American track cyclist and cycling manager
- Mark Gronowski (born 2001), American football player
- Mark Gurr (born 1966), Zimbabwean tennis player
- Mark Guy, American football player
- Mark Henry, (born 1971), American weightlifter and professional wrestler
- Mark Hughes, Welsh football manager and former player
- Mark Huizinga (born 1973), Dutch judoka
- Mark Hunt, New Zealand mixed martial artist
- Mark Hurst (born 21 October 1995), former Scottish footballer
- Mark Inglis (born 1959), New Zealand mountaineer
- Mark Ingram Sr. (born 1965), American football player
- Mark Ingram II (born 1989), American football player
- Mark Jindrak, American professional wrestler
- Mark Kafentzis, American football player
- Mark Kellar, American football player
- Mark Kennedy (footballer, born 1976), Irish footballer
- Mark Koenig (1904–1993), American baseball player
- Mark Kondratiuk (born 2003), Russian figure skater
- Mark Lapidus (born 1995), Estonian chess player
- Mark Lazarus (born 1938), English soccer player
- Mark LoMonaco (born 1971), American professional wrestler who uses the ring name Bubba Ray Dudley
- Mark Lomuket (born 1999), Kenyan long-distance runner
- Mark Lyons, American basketball player in Israeli Basketball Premier League
- Mark Major, Canadian ice hockey player
- Mark Malyar (born 2000), Israeli Paralympic champion and world champion para swimmer
- Mark Mangino (born 1956), American football coach
- Mark Martin (born 1959), NASCAR driver
- Mark McGwire (born 1963), American baseball player
- Mark Messier (born 1961), Canadian retired hockey player
- Mark Midler (1931–2012), Soviet two-time Olympic champion foil fencer
- Mark Mulder, American baseball player
- Mark Nenow, American long-distance runner
- Mark Noble, English footballer
- Mark Nulty (born 1967), Irish cricketer
- Mark O'Mahony (born 2005), Irish footballer
- Mark O'Meara (born 1957), American professional golfer
- Mark Otten (born 1985), Dutch footballer
- Mark Paré, Canadian NHL official
- Mark Payton (born 1991), American professional baseball player
- Mark Phillips, British Olympic gold-medal horseman
- Mark Pinger, German swimmer
- Mark Price, American basketball player
- Mark Rakita (born 1938), Soviet two-time Olympic champion saber fencer
- Mark Recchi, Canadian hockey player
- Mark Redman (born 1974), American baseball player
- Mark Redman (American football) (born 2002), American football player
- Mark Reid (born 1961), Scottish footballer
- Mark Richt (born 1960), American football coach
- Mark Ricks (gridiron football), American football player
- Mark Roth (1951–2021), American pro bowler
- Mark Robins, English football manager and former player
- Mark Roopenian, American football player
- Mark Rypien, American football player
- Mark Sanchez American football player
- Mark Sanford (basketball) American basketball player
- Mark Scheifele, Canadian ice hockey player
- Mark Sears (born 2002), American basketball player
- Mark Selby, English professional snooker and pool player
- Mark Shapiro (sports executive), American baseball executive
- Mark Siebeck, German volleyball player
- Mark Simoneau, American football player
- Mark Sloan (wrestler), British wrestler
- Mark Spitz (born 1950), American nine-time Olympic champion swimmer
- Mark Stanforth, American marathon runner and coach
- Mark Stephney, Montserratian cricketer
- Mark Stone, Canadian ice hockey player
- Mark Streit, Swiss professional ice hockey defenceman
- Mark Švets, Estonian footballer
- Mark Taimanov, Soviet Russian chess player
- Mark Teixeira, professional baseball player (MLB)
- Mark Thorson, American football player
- Mark Todd (equestrian), New Zealand equestrian
- Mark Tollefsen (born 1992), American basketball player in Israeli Basketball Premier League
- Mark Travers (born 1999), Irish footballer
- Mark Traynowicz, American football player
- Mark Trueman (born 1988), English football manager and former player
- Mark Tuitert (born 1980), Dutch speed skater
- Mark Turenshine (1944–2016), American-Israeli basketball player
- Mark van der Zijden (born 1973), Dutch swimmer
- Mark Veens (born 1978), Dutch swimmer
- Mark Veldmate, Dutch footballer
- Mark Viduka, Australian soccer player
- Mark Vientos (born 1999), American baseball player
- Mark Village (born 1991) Canadian soccer coach and former player
- Mark Vital (born 1996), American basketball and football player
- Mark Walsh (darts player), professional darts player
- Mark Walton (American football) (born 1997), American football player
- Mark Ward (footballer born 1982), English footballer
- Mark Warnecke, German swimmer
- Mark Waugh (born 1965), Australian test cricketer (1991–2002) and twin brother of Steve Waugh
- Mark Webber (born 1976), Australian Formula 1 driver
- Mark Wiebe (born 1957), American professional golfer
- Mark Williams (snooker player), Welsh professional snooker player
- Mark Worthington, Australian basketball player
- Mark Wotte (born 1960), Dutch football manager and former player
- Mark Zahra (born 1982), Australian jockey

=== Crime ===
- Mark Asay (1964–2017), American spree killer
- Mark Bridger (b. 1965), a paedophile who abducted and murdered a 5-year-old girl
- Mark Barton (1955–1999), perpetrator of the 1999 Atlanta day trading firm shootings
- Mark David Chapman (born 1955), American who murdered John Lennon
- Mark William Cunningham (born 1960), American serial killer
- Mark Essex (1949–1973), American serial killer/mass murderer
- Mark Fellows (1980) English hitman convicted of killing John Kinsella and Paul Massey
- Mark Goudeau (born 1964), American serial killer, rapist, and kidnapper
- Mark R. Hobson (born 1969), British spree killer
- Mark Hofmann (born 1954), American counterfeiter and spree killer
- Mark Martin (born 1979), British serial killer
- Mark J. Newton, convicted child sexual abuser
- Mark Rosario, a pseudonym used by the suspect in the 2024 killing of U.S. insurance executive Brian Thompson
- Mark Rowntree (born 1956), British spree killer
- Mark Smich (born 1987), Canadian serial killer
- Mark Alan Smith (born 1949), American serial killer
- Mark Anthony Stroman (1969–2011), American spree killer
- Mark Twitchell (born 1979), Canadian murderer
- Mark Winger (born 1962), American murderer

=== Other occupations ===
- Mark E. Benden, American ergonomist
- Mark N. Brown (born 1951), American astronaut
- Mark Codman, American slave executed in 1755
- Mark of Cornwall, king of Kernow in the early 6th century
- W. Mark Felt (1913–2008), American FBI official known as Deep Throat
- Mark Fischbach (born 1989), American YouTuber known as "Markiplier"
- Mark Frerichs (born 1962), American civil engineer and former US Navy diver who disappeared in 2020
- Mark Hulsbeck, American aquanaut
- Mark Labbett, English TV personality
- Mark Meechan, Scottish YouTuber
- Mark Milley (born 1958), U.S. Army General
- Mark Newhouse (born 1985), American professional poker player
- Mark Rober, American YouTuber, engineer, inventor, and educator
- Mark Salazar, Filipino journalist
- Mark Uytterhoeven, Belgian television presenter

== Fictional characters ==
- Mark the Dj, a character from the 2010 dramatic/romantic musical film Burlesque
- Mark the Minion, a character from the 2010 animated film Despicable Me
- Mark Antony, a fictional representation of the person from the film Cleopatra
- Mark Baker, a character from the 2003 film Cheaper by the Dozen
- Mark Brendanawicz, a character from the NBC comedy television series Parks and Recreation
- Mark Brennan and Mark Gottlieb, characters from the Australian soap opera Neighbours
- Mark Chang, a character from the television series The Fairly OddParents
- Mark Clark, a character from the 1967 film Far from the Madding Crowd
- Mark Cotswolds, from the South Park episode Hooked on Monkey Fonics
- Mark Cohen, a character from the Broadway musical from Rent
- Mark Corrigan, a character in the British sitcom Peep Show
- Mark Dalton, character from the ABC Daytime soap opera, All My Children
- Mark Darcy, character from the Bridget Jones's Diary series of Books and Movies.
- Mark Donovan, a character from the television series The Inbetweeners
- Mark Evans, main protagonist of the game, show, and manga Inazuma Eleven
- Mark Foster, a character in the American TV sitcom Step by Step
- Mark Fowler, a character from the British BBC soap opera EastEnders
- Mark Gordon, a character in the American fantasy drama television series Highway to Heaven
- Mark Gray, a character in A Nightmare on Elm Street
- Mark Grayson, also known by his superhero alias Invincible, a character from the comic series of the same name
- Mark Greene, a character from the American medical drama series ER
- Mark Griff, Stanley's father and a Cartoonist in the Playhouse Disney animated television series Stanley
- Mark Hallett (Sunder), a Marvel Comics character and member of the Morlocks
- Mark Halliday, a character from the 1954 film Dial M for Murder
- Mark Hanna, a character from the 2013 film The Wolf of Wall Street
- Mark Haskins, a character from the 2006 American sports drama film Glory Road
- Mark Healy, a character in the American sitcom television series Roseanne
- Mark Heathcliff, a character from the Mandela Catalogue Series.
- Mark Hoffman, character and the secondary antagonist of the Saw franchise
- Mark Hogan, a character in the American sitcom television series The Hogan Family
- Mark Taylor Jackson, a character from the 2009 American film Funny People
- Mark Jennings, a character from the 1985 film That Was Then, This Is Now
- Mark Loring, a character from the 2007 American comedy drama film Juno
- Mark "Skid" McCormick, a character in the American action crime drama television series Hardcastle and McCormick
- Mark McGowan, a character in the 1984 American 3D slasher movie Silent Madness
- Mark Randell, a character in the Canadian-produced sitcom Learning the Ropes
- Mark Raxton (Molten Man), a Marvel Comics supervillain and enemy of Spider-Man
- Mark Renton, a character from the 1996 British film Trainspotting
- Mark Roth, a character in the 1990 American romantic comedy film Pretty Woman
- Mark Scout, a character from the 2022 American science-fiction drama television series Severance
- Mark Sheppard (DJ), a Marvel Comics character associated with the X-Men
- Mark Simon, a character in the 1998 American science-fiction disaster movie Deep Impact
- Mark Everett Sloan, a character from the ABC medical drama television series Grey's Anatomy
- Mark Taylor, the youngest son on the Tim Allen ABC sitcom, Home Improvement (TV series)
- Mark Thackeray, a character from the 1967 film To Sir, with Love
- Mark "Toad Boy", a character in the 1985 American horror comedy movie Ghoulies
- Mark Anthony Todd (Blazing Skull), a Golden Age Marvel Comics superhero
- Mark Wells, a fictional representation of the hockey player
- Mark Williams, a character from the BBC medical drama Holby City
- Mark Wylde, a character from the British ITV soap opera, Emmerdale

== Disambiguation pages ==
- Mark Adams (disambiguation)
- Mark Alexander (disambiguation)
- Mark Allen (disambiguation)
- Mark Almond (disambiguation)
- Mark Anderson (disambiguation)
- Mark Andrews (disambiguation)
- Mark Anthony (disambiguation)
- Mark Armstrong (disambiguation)
- Mark Arnold (disambiguation)
- Mark Atkins (disambiguation)
- Mark Atkinson (disambiguation)
- Mark Austin (disambiguation)
- Mark Bailey (disambiguation)
- Mark Baker (disambiguation)
- Mark Baldwin (disambiguation)
- Mark Bamford (disambiguation)
- Mark Barnett (disambiguation)
- Mark Barry (disambiguation)
- Mark Beard (disambiguation)
- Mark Beaumont (disambiguation)
- Mark Beech (disambiguation)
- Mark Beers (disambiguation)
- Mark Bell (disambiguation)
- Mark Bennett (disambiguation)
- Mark Benson (disambiguation)
- Mark Berger (disambiguation)
- Mark Berry (disambiguation)
- Mark Beyer (disambiguation)
- Mark Birch (disambiguation)
- Mark Blake (disambiguation)
- Mark Bond (disambiguation)
- Mark Bowden (disambiguation)
- Mark Bowen (disambiguation)
- Mark Boyle (disambiguation)
- Mark Bradley (disambiguation)
- Mark Bradshaw (disambiguation)
- Mark Brandenburg (disambiguation)
- Mark Brennan (disambiguation)
- Mark Brewer (disambiguation)
- Mark Bridges (disambiguation)
- Mark Bright (disambiguation)
- Mark Brooks (disambiguation)
- Mark Brown (disambiguation)
- Mark Browne (disambiguation)
- Mark Bryant (disambiguation)
- Mark Buckingham (disambiguation)
- Mark Bunn (disambiguation)
- Mark Burgess (disambiguation)
- Mark Burnett (disambiguation)
- Mark Burns (disambiguation)
- Mark Burstein (disambiguation)
- Mark Burton (disambiguation)
- Mark Cairns (disambiguation)
- Mark Cameron (disambiguation)
- Mark Campbell (disambiguation)
- Mark Canning (disambiguation)
- Mark Carlson (disambiguation)
- Mark Carrier (disambiguation)
- Mark Carrington (disambiguation)
- Mark Carroll (disambiguation)
- Mark Carter (disambiguation)
- Mark Casey (disambiguation)
- Mark Chamberlain (disambiguation)
- Mark Chapman (disambiguation)
- Mark Christensen (disambiguation)
- Mark Chua (disambiguation)
- Mark Clark (disambiguation)
- Mark Clayton (disambiguation)
- Mark Cleary (disambiguation)
- Mark Cohen (disambiguation)
- Mark Collet (disambiguation)
- Mark Collins (disambiguation)
- Mark Cooper (disambiguation)
- Mark Corrigan (disambiguation)
- Mark Costello (disambiguation)
- Mark Cousins (disambiguation)
- Mark Cox (disambiguation)
- Mark Coyne (disambiguation)
- Mark Cross (disambiguation)
- Mark Cullen (disambiguation)
- Mark Currie (disambiguation)
- Mark Curry (disambiguation)
- Mark Curtis (disambiguation)
- Mark Dalton (disambiguation)
- Mark Daly (disambiguation)
- Mark Davies (disambiguation)
- Mark Davis (disambiguation)
- Mark Dawson (disambiguation)
- Mark Day (disambiguation)
- Mark DeSantis (disambiguation)
- Mark Dean (disambiguation)
- Mark Delaney (disambiguation)
- Mark Dempsey (disambiguation)
- Mark Devlin (disambiguation)
- Mark Dickson (disambiguation)
- Mark Donald (disambiguation)
- Mark Donovan (disambiguation)
- Mark Draper (disambiguation)
- Mark Driscoll (disambiguation)
- Mark Duffy (disambiguation)
- Mark Duncan (disambiguation)
- Mark Eaton (disambiguation)
- Mark Edwards (disambiguation)
- Mark Elliot (disambiguation)
- Mark Elliott (disambiguation)
- Mark Ellis (disambiguation)
- Mark English (disambiguation)
- Mark Epstein (disambiguation)
- Mark Estrin (disambiguation)
- Mark Evans (disambiguation)
- Mark Everett (disambiguation)
- Mark Farrell (disambiguation)
- Mark Feldman (disambiguation)
- Mark Fellows (disambiguation)
- Mark Feltham (disambiguation)
- Mark Ferguson (disambiguation)
- Mark Fields (disambiguation)
- Mark Fischer (disambiguation)
- Mark Fisher (disambiguation)
- Mark Fitzgerald (disambiguation)
- Mark Flanagan (disambiguation)
- Mark Fletcher (disambiguation)
- Mark Flood (disambiguation)
- Mark Ford (disambiguation)
- Mark Forster (disambiguation)
- Mark Foster (disambiguation)
- Mark Fowler (disambiguation)
- Mark Fox (disambiguation)
- Mark Francis (disambiguation)
- Mark Fraser (disambiguation)
- Mark Frith (disambiguation)
- Mark Frost (disambiguation)
- Mark Fuller (disambiguation)
- Mark Gardner (disambiguation)
- Mark George (disambiguation)
- Mark Gertler (disambiguation)
- Mark Gillespie (disambiguation)
- Mark Gold (disambiguation)
- Mark Goodwin (disambiguation)
- Mark Gordon (disambiguation)
- Mark Gottlieb (disambiguation)
- Mark Graham (disambiguation)
- Mark Grant (disambiguation)
- Mark Gray (disambiguation)
- Mark Green (disambiguation)
- Mark Greene (disambiguation)
- Mark Griffin (disambiguation)
- Mark Gross (disambiguation)
- Mark Hall (disambiguation)
- Mark Hallett (disambiguation)
- Mark Hamilton (disambiguation)
- Mark Hammond (disambiguation)
- Mark Hanna (disambiguation)
- Mark Hansen (disambiguation)
- Mark Hanson (disambiguation)
- Mark Hardy (disambiguation)
- Mark Harman (disambiguation)
- Mark Harper (disambiguation)
- Mark Harrington (disambiguation)
- Mark Harris (disambiguation)
- Mark Harrison (disambiguation)
- Mark Hatton (disambiguation)
- Mark Hawthorne (disambiguation)
- Mark Hayes (disambiguation)
- Mark Healy (disambiguation)
- Mark Helfrich (disambiguation)
- Mark Henderson (disambiguation)
- Mark Henry (disambiguation)
- Mark Herring (disambiguation)
- Mark Higgins (disambiguation)
- Mark Hildreth (disambiguation)
- Mark Hill (disambiguation)
- Mark Hilton (disambiguation)
- Mark Hoffman (disambiguation)
- Mark Hogan (disambiguation)
- Mark Holden (disambiguation)
- Mark Hollis (disambiguation)
- Mark Holmes (disambiguation)
- Mark Hopkins (disambiguation)
- Mark Horton (disambiguation)
- Mark Howard (disambiguation)
- Mark Howe (disambiguation)
- Mark Hubbard (disambiguation)
- Mark Hudson (disambiguation)
- Mark Hughes (disambiguation)
- Mark Humphrey (disambiguation)
- Mark Hunt (disambiguation)
- Mark Hunter (disambiguation)
- Mark Hutchinson (disambiguation)
- Mark Hylton (disambiguation)
- Mark Hyman (disambiguation)
- Mark Irwin (disambiguation)
- Mark Isherwood (disambiguation)
- Mark Jackson (disambiguation)
- Mark Jacobs (disambiguation)
- Mark Jacobson (disambiguation)
- Mark James (disambiguation)
- Mark Jenkins (disambiguation)
- Mark Jennings (disambiguation)
- Mark Johnson (disambiguation)
- Mark Johnston (disambiguation)
- Mark Jones (disambiguation)
- Mark Jordan (disambiguation)
- Mark Joseph (disambiguation)
- Mark Judge (disambiguation)
- Mark Kaplan (disambiguation)
- Mark Katz (disambiguation)
- Mark Keller (disambiguation)
- Mark Kellogg (disambiguation)
- Mark Kelly (disambiguation)
- Mark Kendall (disambiguation)
- Mark Kendrick (disambiguation)
- Mark Kennedy (disambiguation)
- Mark Kerr (disambiguation)
- Mark Killilea (disambiguation)
- Mark King (disambiguation)
- Mark Kingdon (disambiguation)
- Mark Kleinschmidt (disambiguation)
- Mark Kwok (disambiguation)
- Mark Lambert (disambiguation)
- Mark Lancaster (disambiguation)
- Mark Lane (disambiguation)
- Mark Laurie (disambiguation)
- Mark Lawrence (disambiguation)
- Mark Lawson (disambiguation)
- Mark Lee (disambiguation)
- Mark Lemmon (disambiguation)
- Mark Leonard (disambiguation)
- Mark Leslie (disambiguation)
- Mark Levine (disambiguation)
- Mark Levinson (disambiguation)
- Mark Lewis (disambiguation)
- Mark Lindsay (disambiguation)
- Mark Little (disambiguation)
- Mark Lloyd (disambiguation)
- Mark Logan (disambiguation)
- Mark Lopez (disambiguation)
- Mark Lutz (disambiguation)
- Mark Lynch (disambiguation)
- Mark MacDonald (disambiguation)
- Mark Martin (disambiguation)
- Mark Mason (disambiguation)
- Mark Matthews (disambiguation)
- Mark Mayer (disambiguation)
- Mark McCormack (disambiguation)
- Mark McCormick (disambiguation)
- Mark McDonald (disambiguation)
- Mark McGowan (disambiguation)
- Mark McGuire (disambiguation)
- Mark McKenzie (disambiguation)
- Mark McMahon (disambiguation)
- Mark McNally (disambiguation)
- Mark Meadows (disambiguation)
- Mark Meyer (disambiguation)
- Mark Miller (disambiguation)
- Mark Mills (disambiguation)
- Mark Mitchell (disambiguation)
- Mark Montgomery (disambiguation)
- Mark Moore (disambiguation)
- Mark Moran (disambiguation)
- Mark Morgan (disambiguation)
- Mark Morris (disambiguation)
- Mark Morrison (disambiguation)
- Mark Morton (disambiguation)
- Mark Mullins (disambiguation)
- Mark Murphy (disambiguation)
- Mark Murray (disambiguation)
- Mark Napier (disambiguation)
- Mark Nelson (disambiguation)
- Mark Newman (disambiguation)
- Mark Nicholls (disambiguation)
- Mark Nichols (disambiguation)
- Mark Nielsen (disambiguation)
- Mark Noble (disambiguation)
- Mark Norman (disambiguation)
- Mark Norris (disambiguation)
- Mark O'Brien (disambiguation)
- Mark O'Connell (disambiguation)
- Mark O'Connor (disambiguation)
- Mark O'Keefe (disambiguation)
- Mark O'Leary (disambiguation)
- Mark O'Neill (disambiguation)
- Mark O'Shea (disambiguation)
- Mark O'Toole (disambiguation)
- Mark Olsen (disambiguation)
- Mark Olson (disambiguation)
- Mark Ormerod (disambiguation)
- Mark Ormrod (disambiguation)
- Mark Osborne (disambiguation)
- Mark Parry (disambiguation)
- Mark Paterson (disambiguation)
- Mark Patterson (disambiguation)
- Mark Pattison (disambiguation)
- Mark Payne (disambiguation)
- Mark Pearson (disambiguation)
- Mark Perry (disambiguation)
- Mark Peters (disambiguation)
- Mark Petersen (disambiguation)
- Mark Peterson (disambiguation)
- Mark Phillips (disambiguation)
- Mark Pilkington (disambiguation)
- Mark Platts (disambiguation)
- Mark Porter (disambiguation)
- Mark Potter (disambiguation)
- Mark Powell (disambiguation)
- Mark Preston (disambiguation)
- Mark Price (disambiguation)
- Mark Pritchard (disambiguation)
- Mark Proctor (disambiguation)
- Mark Pryor (disambiguation)
- Mark Quayle (disambiguation)
- Mark Radcliffe (disambiguation)
- Mark Radford (disambiguation)
- Mark Randall (disambiguation)
- Mark Read (disambiguation)
- Mark Reed (disambiguation)
- Mark Reilly (disambiguation)
- Mark Rein (disambiguation)
- Mark Reynolds (disambiguation)
- Mark Richards (disambiguation)
- Mark Richardson (disambiguation)
- Mark Ricketts (disambiguation)
- Mark Ridley (disambiguation)
- Mark Riley (disambiguation)
- Mark Ritchie (disambiguation)
- Mark Roberts (disambiguation)
- Mark Robertson (disambiguation)
- Mark Robinson (disambiguation)
- Mark Robson (disambiguation)
- Mark Rogers (disambiguation)
- Mark Rose (disambiguation)
- Mark Rosenthal (disambiguation)
- Mark Rosenzweig (disambiguation)
- Mark Russell (disambiguation)
- Mark Rutherford (disambiguation)
- Mark Ryan (disambiguation)
- Mark Sainsbury (disambiguation)
- Mark Sanchez (disambiguation)
- Mark Sanders (disambiguation)
- Mark Saunders (disambiguation)
- Mark Savage (disambiguation)
- Mark Scanlon (disambiguation)
- Mark Schneider (disambiguation)
- Mark Schroeder (disambiguation)
- Mark Schultz (disambiguation)
- Mark Scott (disambiguation)
- Mark Shapiro (disambiguation)
- Mark Shaw (disambiguation)
- Mark Shepherd (disambiguation)
- Mark Sherman (disambiguation)
- Mark Shriver (disambiguation)
- Mark Shulman (disambiguation)
- Mark Simmons (disambiguation)
- Mark Simpson (disambiguation)
- Mark Sinclair (disambiguation)
- Mark Singleton (disambiguation)
- Mark Slade (disambiguation)
- Mark Slater (disambiguation)
- Mark Sloan (disambiguation)
- Mark Smith (disambiguation)
- Mark Solomon (disambiguation)
- Mark Sorenson (disambiguation)
- Mark Spencer (disambiguation)
- Mark Steadman (disambiguation)
- Mark Steele (disambiguation)
- Mark Stein (disambiguation)
- Mark Stevens (disambiguation)
- Mark Stewart (disambiguation)
- Mark Stone (disambiguation)
- Mark Stuart (disambiguation)
- Mark Sullivan (disambiguation)
- Mark Sutcliffe (disambiguation)
- Mark Tandy (disambiguation)
- Mark Taylor (disambiguation)
- Mark Templeton (disambiguation)
- Mark Thomas (disambiguation)
- Mark Thompson (disambiguation)
- Mark Thomson (disambiguation)
- Mark Todd (disambiguation)
- Mark Tucker (disambiguation)
- Mark Turner (disambiguation)
- Mark Twain (disambiguation)
- Mark Tyler (disambiguation)
- Mark Waddington (disambiguation)
- Mark Wade (disambiguation)
- Mark Wagner (disambiguation)
- Mark Wakefield (disambiguation)
- Mark Walker (disambiguation)
- Mark Wallace (disambiguation)
- Mark Wallberg (disambiguation)
- Mark Waller (disambiguation)
- Mark Wallington (disambiguation)
- Mark Walsh (disambiguation)
- Mark Walton (disambiguation)
- Mark Ward (disambiguation)
- Mark Warner (disambiguation)
- Mark Warren (disambiguation)
- Mark Washington (disambiguation)
- Mark Waters (disambiguation)
- Mark Watson (disambiguation)
- Mark Watts (disambiguation)
- Mark Webb (disambiguation)
- Mark Webber (disambiguation)
- Mark Webster (disambiguation)
- Mark West (disambiguation)
- Mark Whitaker (disambiguation)
- Mark White (disambiguation)
- Mark Wilkins (disambiguation)
- Mark Wilkinson (disambiguation)
- Mark Williams (disambiguation)
- Mark Williamson (disambiguation)
- Mark Willis (disambiguation)
- Mark Wilson (disambiguation)
- Mark Withers (disambiguation)
- Mark Wood (disambiguation)
- Mark Woods (disambiguation)
- Mark Wright (disambiguation)
- Mark Yates (disambiguation)
- Mark Yeates (disambiguation)
- Mark Young (disambiguation)
- Mark Zupan (disambiguation)
