= Mark Olsen =

Mark Olsen may refer to:

- Mark V. Olsen (born 1962), U.S. screenwriter, co-creator of Big Love on HBO
- Mark S. Olsen (born 1962), New Zealand portrait artist

== See also ==
- Marc Olsen (born 1986), Danish football (soccer) player
- Mark Olssen, political theorist
- Mark Olson (disambiguation)
