= Mark Waddington =

Mark Waddington may refer to:

- Mark Waddington (magician) (born 1989), English entertainer
- Mark Waddington (footballer) (born 1996), English footballer
- Mark Waddington (Doctors), a character from Doctors
