= Marczyński =

Marczyński (feminine Marczyńska) is a Polish surname. Notable people with the surname include:

- Adam Marczyński (1908–1985), Polish painter
- Tomasz Marczyński (born 1984), Polish cyclist

== See also ==
- Surnames derived from the name Mark
