= Mark Henry (disambiguation) =

Mark Henry (born 1971) is an American wrestler and former weightlifter, powerlifter and strongman.

Mark Henry may also refer to:

- Mark Henry (rugby league) (born 1981), Australian rugby league player
- Mark Henry (politician) (died 1952), Irish politician
- Mark Henry (novelist) (born 1968), American urban fantasy writer
