= Marko (surname) =

Marko may refer to:

- Béla Markó (born 1951), Romanian politician and writer of Hungarian ethnicity
- Helmut Marko (born 1943), Austrian racecar driver
- Ida Marko-Varga (born 1985), Swedish swimmer
- Karol Marko (born 1966), Slovak football manager

== See also ==
- Surnames derived from the name Mark
- Marko (given name)
