= Mark Walters (disambiguation) =

Mark Walters (born 1964) is an English former professional footballer.

Mark Walters may also refer to:

- Mark Walters (cyclist) (born 1976), Canadian cyclist

== See also ==
- Mark Walter (born 1960), American businessman
- Mark Waters (disambiguation)
