= Mark Meyer =

Mark Meyer may refer to:

- Mark Meyer (politician) (born 1963), Wisconsin Democratic politician and legislator
- Mark A. Meyer (born 1946), American lawyer

== See also ==
- Mark Mayer (disambiguation)
- Marc Meyer, American archaeologist
- Marc Eugene Meyer (1842–1925), American businessman
