= Mark Shepherd =

Mark Shepherd may refer to:

- Mark Shepherd (businessman) (1923–2009), chairman and CEO of Texas Instruments
- Mark Allen Shepherd (born 1961), actor best known for role as Morn on Deep Space Nine
- Mark Shepherd (novelist) (1961–2011), author of several fantasy novels, such as Elvendude and Spiritride
- Mark R. Shepherd (1953–2011), American environmental consultant, politician, strategist and radio personality
- Mark Shepherd (wrestler) (born 1985), American wrestler known as Shane Taylor

== See also ==
- Mark Shepard (born 1960), Vermont State Senator (R - Bennington County) and former U.S. House candidate
- Mark Sheppard (born 1964), British actor and musician
