= Marc Feldman =

Marc Feldman or similar may refer to:

- Marc Feldmann (born 1944), Oxford-based Australian immunologist
- Marc Allan Feldman (1960–2016), American physician and politician
- Marcus Feldman (born 1942), Australian-born mathematician turned US theoretical biologist
- Mark Feldman (born 1955), American jazz violinist
- Mark Feldman (drummer), American drummer
