= Mark Beyer =

Mark Beyer may refer to:

- Mark Beyer (artist) (born 1950), American comics artist
- Mark Beyer (novelist) (born 1963), American novelist and journalist
