= Markovits =

Markovits is a Magyarised South-Slavic surname. It may refer to the following people:

- Andrei Markovits (born 1948), Romanian political scientist
- Benjamin Markovits (born 1973), British-American writer
- Daniel Markovits (born 1969), American legal scholar
- Inga Markovits (born 1937), American lawyer
- Julia Markovits (born 1979), American philosopher
- Kálmán Markovits (1931–2009), Hungarian water polo player
- László Markovits (born 1970), Hungarian tennis player
- Rodion Markovits (1888–1948), Austro-Hungarian-born writer, journalist and lawyer

== See also ==
- Surnames derived from the name Mark
