= Mark Solomon =

Mark Solomon may refer to:

- Mark Solomon (American politician), a politician from Seattle, Washington
- Mark Solomon (Māori leader) (born c. 1954), New Zealand tribal leader
- Mark Solomon (One Life to Live), a character on the American soap opera
- Mark Solomon (rabbi), a British Rabbi

== See also ==
- Mark Salomon (born 1970), American singer and songwriter
- Marc Solomon (born 1966), American gay-rights advocate
