= Mark Kendall =

Mark Kendall may refer to:

- Mark Kendall (footballer, born 1958) (1958–2008), Welsh football goalkeeper
- Mark Kendall (footballer, born 1961), English footballer
- Mark Kendall (artist), American artist and filmmaker
- Mark Kendall (engineer) (born 1972), Australian engineer
- Mark Kendall (born 1957), American guitarist for the band Great White
