= Markovič =

Markovič is a Czech, Slovak, and Slovenian surname derived from the given name Marek/Mark. Notable people with the surname include:

- Ivan Markovič (1888–1944)
- Jakub Markovič (born 2001), Czech footballer
- Jaroslav Markovič, Slovak ice hockey player
- Mina Markovič (born 1987), Slovenian rock climber
- Peter Markovič (1866–1929), Slovenian-Austrian painter

== See also ==
- Surnames derived from the name Mark
