= Mark Steadman =

Mark Steadman may refer to:

- Mark Steadman (priest) (born 1974), Anglican Archdeacon of Stow
- Mark Steadman (novelist) (born 1930), American novelist
