= Mark Walker =

Mark Walker may refer to:

== Politics and law ==
- Mark L. Walker (born 1941), member of the Illinois House of Representatives
- Mark Walker (North Carolina politician) (born 1969), minister and U.S. House of Representatives member for North Carolina's 6th District
- Mark Walker (Maine politician), member of the Maine House of Representatrives
- Mark W. Walker, member of the Utah House of Representatives
- Mark E. Walker (born 1967), United States federal judge in Florida

== Other ==
- Mark Walker (British Army officer) (1827–1902), Irish recipient of the Victoria Cross
- Mark Walker (entertainer), British cabaret and musical theatre entertainer; regular cast member of 1980s TV show, The Laughter Show
- Mark Walker (songwriter) (1846–1924), fisherman and songwriter
- Mark Alan Walker, professor of philosophy at New Mexico State University
- Mark H. Walker, writer and board wargame designer
- Mark Walker, original plaintiff in Craig v. Boren
- Mark Walker (River City), fictional character
