= Mark Laurie =

Mark Laurie may refer to:

- Mark Laurie (photographer) (born 1955), Canadian photographer
- Mark Laurie (rugby league) (born 1962), Australian rugby league footballer
