= Mark Radcliffe =

Mark Radcliffe may refer to:

- Mark Radcliffe (radio broadcaster) (born 1958), English radio broadcaster, musician and writer
- Mark Radcliffe (politician) (born 1971), American Democratic politician and lawyer
