= Mark Harman =

Mark Harman may refer to:

- Mark Harman (translator) (born 1951), Irish-American translator
- Mark Harman (computer scientist), British computer scientist
- Mark Harman (cricketer) (born 1964), English cricketer

== See also ==
- Mark Harmon (born 1951), American actor
- Mark Harmon (musician), American record producer, songwriter, and bass guitarist
