= Mark Kwok =

Mark Kwok may refer to:

- Mark Kwok (actor) (born 1963)
- Mark Kwok (swimmer) (born 1977)
