= Mark Withers =

Mark Withers may refer to:

- Mark Withers (actor) (1947–2024), American television actor
- Mark Withers (footballer) (born 1964), Australian rules footballer
