= Mark Price (disambiguation) =

Mark Price is an American former basketball player and coach.

Mark Price may also refer to:

- Mark Price (musician) (born 1959), English drummer
- Mark Price (cricketer) (born 1960), English cricketer
- Mark Price, Baron Price (born 1961), British businessman and member of the House of Lords

== See also ==
- Marc Price (born 1968), TV actor
- Mark de Solla Price (born 1960), author, civil rights activist and HIV/AIDS educator
- Mark Price Arena, a multi-purpose arena in Enid, Oklahoma
