= Mark Wagner =

Mark Wagner may refer to:

- Mark Wagner (baseball) (born 1954), former Major League Baseball player
- Mark Wagner (artist) (born 1976), American artist, writer, publisher
- Mark Wagner (musician) (born 1984), American Christian musician

== See also ==
- Mark Wegner, American baseball umpire (born 1972)
