= Mark Griffin =

Mark Griffin may refer to:

== Musicians ==
- Mark Griffin, American rapper and musician known professionally as MC 900 Ft. Jesus
- Marc Griffin, American rapper and musician known professionally as Marc E. Bassy

== Others ==
- Mark Griffin (entrepreneur), billiards promoter and founder of CueSports International
- Mark Griffin (politician) (born 1985), Scottish politician
- Mark Griffin (spiritual teacher) (born 1954), American spiritual teacher
- Mark Griffin (actor) (born 1968), British actor
- Mark Griffin (rugby union) (born 1975), rugby union player
- Marc Griffin (born 1956), American judge
- Marc Griffin (baseball) (born 1968), Canadian baseball broadcaster and former player
