= Mark Sainsbury =

Mark Sainsbury may refer to:

- Mark Sainsbury (philosopher) (born 1943), British philosopher
- Mark Sainsbury (broadcaster) (born 1956), New Zealand current affairs presenter
