= Mark Daly =

Mark Daly may refer to:

- Mark Daly (politician) (born 1973), Irish Fianna Fáil politician
- Mark Daly (actor) (1887–1957), British film actor
- Mark Daly (scientist) (born 1968), human geneticist

== See also ==
- Mark Daley, broadcaster
- Mark Dailey, American-Canadian broadcast journalist
