= Mark Carrington =

Mark Carrington may refer to:

- Mark Carrington (cricketer) (1961–2026), New Zealand cricketer
- Mark Carrington (footballer) (born 1987), English professional footballer
