= Mark Rogers =

Mark Rogers may refer to:

- Mark E. Rogers (1952–2014), American author and illustrator
- Mark Rogers (baseball) (born 1986), American former baseball pitcher
- Mark Rogers (soccer) (born 1975), Canadian former soccer player
- Mark Rogers, lead singer and songwriter of British band Hollywood Beyond
- Mark Rogers, United Future New Zealand candidate in the Aoraki electorate
- Mark C. Rogers (born 1942), American pediatrician, cardiologist, and anesthesiologist

== See also ==
- Marc Rogers, Canadian bassist
