= Mark Templeton =

Mark Templeton may refer to:

- Mark Templeton (trombonist) (born 1975), trombonist with the London Philharmonic Orchestra
- Mark Templeton (electronic musician) (born 1976), Canadian experimental electronic artist
- Mark B. Templeton, former CEO of Citrix Systems, Inc.
