= Mark Perry =

== Sports ==
- Mark Perry (amateur wrestler), college wrestler at University of Iowa, assistant coach at Arizona State University
- Mark Perry (English footballer) (born 1978), former footballer with QPR
- Mark Perry (Scottish footballer) (born 1971), formerly with Dundee United and Aberdeen
- Mark Perry (American football) (born 2001), American football player

== Entertainment ==
- Mark Perry (author) (1950–2021), American author
- Mark Perry (impressionist), British impressionist known from 2DTV and Dead Ringers
- Mark Perry (musician), British fanzine publisher and musician
- Mark B. Perry, American television producer and writer

== Other ==
- Mark J. Perry, professor at the University of Michigan-Flint
- Mark Perry (politician), member of the Arkansas House of Representatives
