= Mark McGowan (disambiguation) =

Mark McGowan (born 1967) is an Australian ex-politician.

Mark McGowan is also the name of:

- Mark McGowan (Gaelic footballer) (born 1988), Donegal player
- Mark McGowan (performance artist) (born 1964), British protester
