= Mark Meadows (disambiguation) =

Mark Meadows (born 1959) is the former U.S. representative for North Carolina's 11th congressional district and the former White House chief of staff.

Mark Meadows may also refer to:

- Mark Stephen Meadows (born 1968), American artist, author, and engineer
- Mark Meadows (Michigan politician) (born 1947), mayor of East Lansing, Michigan, former Michigan legislator, attorney
- Mark Meadows (actor), British actor
