= Mark Wade (disambiguation) =

Mark Wade (born 1965) is an American retired basketball player.

Mark Wade may also refer to:

- Mark Wade, American space enthusiast and author who maintained Encyclopedia Astronautica
- Mark Wade (ventriloquist), American ventriloquist
- Mark Sweeten Wade (1858–1929), Canadian historian

== See also ==
- Wade (surname)
- Wade Mark (born 1953), Trinidadian politician
- Mark Waid (born 1962), American comic book writer
