= Mark Cairns =

Mark Cairns may refer to:

- Mark Cairns (footballer) (born 1969), Scottish football goalkeeper
- Mark Cairns (squash player) (born 1967), English squash player
