= Mark McKenzie =

Mark McKenzie or Mark MacKenzie may refer to:

- Marc MacKenzie, a character in Family Affairs
- Marc McKenzie (born 1985), Scottish football player
- Mark Mackenzie (1888–1914), Scottish cricketer
- Mark MacKenzie, American politician
- Mark McKenzie (composer) (born 1957), American film score composer
- Mark McKenzie (rugby union) (born 1971), Scottish rugby union player
- Mark McKenzie (soccer, born 1999), American soccer player
- Mark McKenzie (footballer, born 2000), Scottish football player
- Mark McKenzie (Australian footballer), Australian rules football player for Woodville-West Torrens Football Club
