= Mark Mason =

Mark Mason may refer to:

- Mark Mason (athlete) (born 1969), retired Guyanese long jumper
- Mark Mason (announcer), American public address announcer for the Portland Trail Blazers
- Mark Mason, pseudonym of Septimus Winner (1827–1902), American songwriter
- Mark Mason (cricketer) (born 1975), English cricketer
- Mark Mason, former manager in the Atlantic League of Professional Baseball
- Mark Mason (executive), American business executive

== See also ==
- Order of Mark Master Masons
