= Mark Kleinschmidt =

Mark Kleinschmidt may refer to:

- Mark Kleinschmidt (politician) (born 1970), mayor of Chapel Hill, North Carolina
- Mark Kleinschmidt (rower) (born 1974), German rower
