= Mark Ford =

Mark Ford may refer to:

- Mark Ford (businessman), New Zealand executive, including inaugural chair of Auckland Transport
- Mark Ford (cricketer) (born 1961), South African cricketer
- Mark Ford (poet) (born 1962), British poet
- Mark Ford (footballer) (born 1975), English former association football player
- Mark Ford, founder of the British and Irish Meteorite Society
- Mark M. Ford, American author, entrepreneur, and publisher
- Mark Ford (harness racing) (born 1970), U.S. horse trainer

== See also ==
- Marc Ford (born 1966), guitarist with The Black Crowes
