= Mark Moore (disambiguation) =

Mark Moore (born 1965) is a British record producer and nightclub owner.

Mark Moore may also refer to:

- Mark H. Moore, American professor focusing on nonprofit organizations
- Mark Moore (American football) (born 1964), American football player
- Mark Moore (educator) (born 1961), British educator headmaster and Head of College of Clifton College
- Mark Moore (ice hockey) (born 1977), Canadian retired ice hockey defenseman
- Mark Moore (rower) (born 1939), American rower
- Mark Moore (skier) (born 1961), British Olympic skier
- Mark Moore, owner of Team Moore Racing

== See also ==
- Marcus Moore (born 1970), American former Major League Baseball player
