= Mark Donald =

Mark Donald may refer to:

- Don (character), real name Mark Donald, a fictional character in the Don film franchise
- Mark L. Donald, United States Navy SEAL, combat medic, and physician assistant
