= Mark Pearson =

Mark Pearson may refer to:

- Mark Pearson (entrepreneur) (born 1980), British entrepreneur and founder of Markco Media
- Mark Pearson (field hockey) (born 1987), Canadian field hockey player
- Mark Pearson (footballer) (1939–2023), British footballer
- Mark Pearson (musician), American singer with Nielsen Pearson
- Mark Pearson (Australian politician) (born 1959), Australian politician
- Mark Pearson (journalist) (1957–2012), American agricultural journalist and television personality
- Mark Pearson (American politician), member of the New Hampshire House of Representatives
