= Mark Pilkington =

Mark Pilkington may refer to:

- Mark Pilkington (golfer) (born 1978), Welsh professional golfer
- Mark Pilkington (writer) (born 1973), English writer
