= Mark Eaton (disambiguation) =

Mark Eaton (1957–2021) was an American basketball player.

Mark Eaton may also refer to:

- Mark Eaton (cricketer) (born 1953), Australian cricketer
- Mark Eaton (ice hockey) (born 1977), American professional ice hockey player

== See also ==
- Mark Eaton Walker (born 1967), American judge
- Mark Eden (1928–2021), English actor
- Mark Eden, company that sold Mark Eden bust developer
