= Mark Hunt (disambiguation) =

Mark Hunt is an MMA fighter.

Mark or Marc Hunt may also refer to:

- Mark Hunt (footballer)
- Mark Hunt (politician)
- Marc Hunt who played Water polo at the 1993 Summer Universiade
