= Mark Shriver =

Mark Shriver could refer to:

- Mark D. Shriver, American population geneticist.
- Mark Kennedy Shriver (born 1964), American politician
