= Mark Devlin =

Mark Devlin may refer to:

- Mark D. Devlin (1948–2005), author
- Mark Devlin (American football) (1894–1973), professional American football player
- Mark Devlin (footballer) (born 1973), footballer who played in The Football League for Exeter City and Stoke City
