= Mark Chapman =

Mark Chapman may refer to:

- Mark Chapman (broadcaster) (born 1973), British sports journalist and presenter
- Mark Chapman (cricketer) (born 1994), Hong Kong and New Zealand cricketer
- Mark Chapman (theologian) (born 1960), British Anglican theologian
- Mark David Chapman (born 1955), American murderer of John Lennon
- Mark Lindsay Chapman (born 1954), English film and television actor
- Mark Chapman (American football) (born 1994), American football wide receiver
- Mark Chapman, guitarist with the band A

== See also ==
- Marco Allen Chapman (1971–2008), American murderer executed in Kentucky
