= Mark Sloan =

Mark Sloan may refer to:

- Mark Sloan (curator) (born 1957), American artist, curator and museum director
- Mark Sloan (wrestler) (born 1978), British professional wrestler
- Mark Sloan (Diagnosis: Murder), lead character in U.S. TV series Diagnosis: Murder, played by Dick Van Dyke
- Mark Sloan (Grey's Anatomy), character in U.S. TV series Grey's Anatomy, played by Eric Dane
