= Mark O'Toole =

Mark O'Toole may refer to:

- Mark O'Toole (bishop) (born 1963), Roman Catholic Archbishop of Cardiff-Menevia
- Mark O'Toole (musician) (born 1964), bassist with Frankie Goes to Hollywood
- Mark O'Toole (screenwriter), Australian screenwriter and producer, executive producer of Thalu
