= Mark Bone =

Swimming coach

- Born: 1960 (age 65–66)
- Education: BCA Wellington University, Hastings Boys' High School
- Occupations: Swimming instructor, national swimming coach
- Years active: 1990–present
- Employer: Swimming New Zealand (former)
- Mother: Ngaire Bone
- Awards: Swimming New Zealand Lifetime Membership

Mark Bone (born 1960) is a New Zealand swimming instructor and former national coach. He served as the national swimming coach from 1990 to 1996. Under him, New Zealand's swimming programme saw its most successful period, with a win at the 1995 FINA World Short Course Swimming Championship in the 4x100 metre medley relay and Danyon Loader's (New Zealand's sole Olympic swimming champion) double gold in the 200 and 400 metre freestyle at the 1996 Olympic Games in Atlanta. He has also coached triathletes Hamish Carter and Bevan Docherty, who won gold and silver respectively in the men's triathlon at the 2004 Olympic Games in Athens.
