= Mark Herring (disambiguation) =

Mark Herring may refer to:

- Mark Herring (born 1961), Virginia Attorney General
- Mark Herring (swimmer), New Zealand swimmer, who swam at the 2008 Olympics

== See also ==
- Marc Herring, multimedia artist and businessman
