= Mark Fields =

Mark Fields may refer to:

- Mark Fields (businessman) (born 1961), president and CEO of Ford Motor Company
- Mark Fields (cornerback) (born 1996), American football player
- Mark Fields (linebacker) (born 1972), American National Football League player

== See also ==
- Mark Field (born 1964), British politician
- Mark Field (rugby league) (born 1984), English rugby league footballer
