= Mark Keller =

Mark Keller may refer to:

- Mark Keller (actor) (born 1965), German actor
- Mark Keller (politician) (born 1954), American politician

== See also ==
- Marc Keller (born 1968), French footballer
