= Mark Berger =

Mark Berger may refer to:

- Mark Berger (economist) (1955–2003), director of the Center for Business and Economic Research at the University of Kentucky
- Mark Berger (judoka) (born 1954), Canadian judoka
- Mark Berger (sound engineer) (born 1943), American sound engineer and Academy Award winner
