= Mark Henry (novelist) =

American urban fantasy author (born 1968)

- Born: June 12, 1968 (age 58); United States
- Occupation: Author
- Writing career
- Period: 2008–present
- Genre: Urban fantasy
- Website: www.markhenry.us

Mark Henry (born June 12, 1968) is an American urban fantasy author, known for his Amanda Feral series. He has also written under the pen names of Amanda Feral and Daniel Marks.

== Bibliography ==
=== Amanda Feral series ===
1. Happy Hour of the Damned (2008)
2. Road Trip of the Living Dead (2009)
3. Battle of the Network Zombies (2010)
4. Beach Blanket Bloodbath (2014)
5. A Night to Dismember (TBD)
6. Ship of Ghouls (TBD)

=== Carnal Staircase trilogy ===
1. Balustrade (2014)

=== Other works ===
- Stocking Full of Coal (2010, as Amanda Feral)
- Velveteen (2012, as Daniel Marks)
- Parts & Wreck (2013)
- Seafoam (2014)
- Park John (2014)
