= Mark Hill =

Mark or Marc Hill may refer to:

- Marc Hill (1952–2025), American baseball player
- Marc Lamont Hill (born 1978), American academic, journalist, author, activist and television personality
- Mark Hill (antiques expert) (born 1975), British antiques expert
- Mark Hill (cricketer) (born 1964), Australian cricketer
- Mark Hill (English footballer) (born 1961), English football player (Maidstone United)
- Mark Hill (musician) (born 1972), British recording artist, songwriter and record producer
- Mark Hill (Scottish footballer) (born 1998), Scottish football player (St Mirren)
- Mark Langdon Hill (1772–1842), United States Representative from Massachusetts and from Maine
- Mark D. Hill, computer scientist

== See also ==
- Lord Marcus Hill (Marcus Sandys, 3rd Baron Sandys, 1798–1863), British politician
- Hill (surname)
