= Mark Clayton =

Mark Clayton may refer to:

- Mark Clayton (American football, born 1961), American football wide receiver for the Miami Dolphins and Green Bay Packers
- Mark Clayton (American football, born 1982), American football wide receiver for the Baltimore Ravens and St. Louis Rams
