= Mark Levine =

Mark Levine or variants may refer to:

- Mark Levine (musician) (Mark J. Levine, born 1938), American jazz musician
- Mark Levin (born 1957), American conservative radio host
- Mark Levine (poet) (born 1965), American poet
- Mark Levin (director) (born 1966), American director and screenwriter
- Marc Levin, American filmmaker
- Mark Levine (Virginia politician) (born 1966), delegate in the Virginia State House of Delegates
- Mark Levine (New York politician) (born 1969), Comptroller of New York City
- Marc Levine (California politician) (born 1974), California legislator
- Marc Levine (mathematician) (born 1952), American mathematician
- Mark LeVine, (Mark Andrew LeVine, pronounced Levin), American history professor and musician
- Marc A. Levin, American attorney
