= Mark Dalton =

Mark Dalton may refer to:

- Mark Dalton (All My Children), a fictional character on All My Children
- Mark Dalton (basketball) (born 1964), Australian basketball player and coach
- Mark Dalton (businessman), American businessman
