= Mark Solomon (rabbi) =

British Rabbi

Mark Solomon is a rabbi and chair of the Beit Din of Liberal Judaism in the UK. He is known for his LGBT-affirmative stance.

Solomon left Orthodox Judaism after coming out as gay, and later joined the Union of Liberal and Progressive Synagogues (ULPS; later Liberal Judaism) in the UK. Alongside lesbian rabbi Elizabeth Tikvah Sarah, he co-led Shabbat services with the Jewish Gay and Lesbian Group, based in London. He later became the rabbi of Sukkat Shalom in Edinburgh, a Liberal Jewish congregation known for its LGBT-friendly stance, as well as rabbi of Neve Shalom Liberal Jewish community in Leicester. He remains rabbi of both communities.

In 2014, Solomon was described as a "pioneer" of Rainbow Jews, an exhibition and film at the London School of Economics which was partly funded by the Heritage Lottery Fund and aimed to research, record and archive the historical experiences of LGBT Jews.

In 2017, he led work to produce the world's first ‘inclusive’ Jewish ketubot (marriage documents), covering same-sex and gender-neutral/non-binary weddings. At the time, he described them as a marker of how Liberal and Progressive Judaism "continues to develop Judaism in the most helpful, sensitive, compassionate and forward-thinking way for the needs of our time."

In 2023, he conducted the first Jewish same-sex wedding in Scotland.

== See also ==
- Jewish views on homosexuality
- LGBT-affirming denominations in Judaism
