= Mark Fellows =

Mark Fellows may refer to:

- Mark Fellows (American football) (born 1963), retired American football linebacker
- Mark Fellows (hitman) (born 1980), English convicted murderer
