= Mark Shulman =

Mark Shulman may refer to:

- Mark Shulman (author) (born 1962), American author
- Mark Shulman (rugby league) (1951–2022), Australian rugby league player

== See also ==
- Shulman (surname)
