= Mark Frith =

Mark Frith may refer to:

- Mark Frith (journalist)
- Mark Frith (musician)

== See also ==
- Mark Firth, English industrialist
