= Mark Simpson =

Mark Simpson may refer to:

- Mark Simpson (basketball) (born 1961), American basketball player
- Mark Simpson (soccer) (born 1966), American soccer player
- Mark Simpson (clarinetist) (born 1988), winner of the BBC Young Musician of the Year, 2006
- Mark Simpson (comics), British comic artist under the pseudonym "Jock"
- Mark Simpson (Ireland correspondent), journalist and BBC Ireland correspondent
- Mark Simpson (journalist), British journalist and broadcaster
- Mark Simpson (politician), British politician
