= Mark Kingdon =

Mark Kingdon may refer to:

- Mark D. Kingdon, angel investor, former CEO of Linden Lab and Organic
- Mark E. Kingdon, hedge fund manager and president of Kingdon Capital Management
