= Mark DeSantis =

Mark DeSantis may refer to:

- Mark DeSantis (businessman) (born 1959), American entrepreneur and political pundit
- Mark DeSantis (ice hockey) (born 1972), Canadian ice hockey defenceman and coach
- Marko DeSantis (born 1972), American lead guitarist for rock band Sugarcult
- Mark DeSantis, professor of finance, see Gunduz Caginalp
- Mark DeSantis, outside linebacker with the 1976, 1977, and 1978 Michigan Wolverines football teams
