= Mark Bowden (disambiguation) =

Mark Bowden (born 1951) is an American journalist and author.

Mark Bowden also refers to:

- Mark Bowden (composer) (born 1979), British classical composer
- Mark Bowden (UN official), British humanitarian and disaster relief worker
- Mark Bowden (English author), body language expert
