= Mark Epstein =

Mark Epstein may refer to:

- Mark Epstein (author) (born 1953), American author and psychotherapist
- Mark Epstein (property developer) (born 1954), owner of Ossa Properties and younger brother of Jeffrey Epstein

== See also ==
- Daniel Mark Epstein (born 1948), American poet, dramatist, and biographer
