= Mark Beech =

Mark Beech may refer to:

- Mark Beech (writer) (1959–2020), British writer and rock critic
- Markbeech or Mark Beech, a village in Kent, England

== See also ==
- Mark Beach (born 1962), British theologian
