= Mark Steadman (novelist) =

American novelist (1930–2020)

Mark S. Steadman, Jr. (July 2, 1930 – February 6, 2020) was an American novelist from Statesboro, Georgia. He taught at Clemson University in South Carolina. Steadman authored four novels, including McAfee County, which received acclaim as the Best First Novel of the Year by Britannica Books.

Steadman was a faculty member at Clemson University from 1957 to 1997, where he taught a range of courses, including "The American Novel" and "Creative Writing". He also held positions as a Visiting Professor of American Literature at the American University in Cairo and as a Fulbright Lecturer in American Literature at Leningrad State University in 1983. Steadman was actively involved in the Civil Rights Movement of the 1960s. He was inducted into the South Carolina Academy of Authors in 2002.

== Bibliography ==
- McAfee County: A Chronicle (1971)
- A Lion's Share (1976)
- Angel Child (1987)
- Bang-Up Season (1990)
