= Mark Healy =

Mark Healy may refer to:

- Mark Healy (Roseanne), a character on the TV series Roseanne
- Mark Healy (Gaelic footballer) (born 1960), Irish retired Gaelic footballer

== See also ==
- Mark Healey, British video game developer
