= Mark Potter =

Mark Potter may refer to:

- Mark Potter (judge) (born 1937), British judge
- Mark Potter (musician), British musician from the band Elbow
- Mark Potter (sportscaster) (born 1960), Canadian sports broadcaster
