= Mark Rein =

Mark Rein may refer to:

- Mark Rein (journalist) (1909–?), Menshevik journalist
- Mark Rein (software executive), vice president and co-founder of Epic Games

== See also ==
- Mark Rein-Hagen (born 1964), role-playing, card, video and board game designer
