= Mark Fitzgerald =

Mark Fitzgerald may refer to:

- Mark Fitzgerald (Degrassi: The Next Generation), a character in Degrassi: The Next Generation
- Mark P. Fitzgerald (born 1951), retired United States Navy admiral
