= Mark Whitaker =

Mark Whitaker may refer to:

- Mark Whitaker (journalist) (born 1957), American journalist and media executive
- Mark Whitaker (record producer), American music producer
- Mark Whitaker (cricketer) (born 1946), former English cricketer

== See also ==
- Mark Whittaker (born 1965), Australian journalist and non-fiction writer
- Mark Whitacre (born 1957), American executive and informant
