= Mark Phillips (disambiguation) =

Mark Phillips (born 1948) is a British equestrian, the former husband of Anne, Princess Royal.

Mark Phillips or Philips may also refer to:

- Mark Phillips (author), joint pseudonym used by American science fiction writers Lawrence Mark Janifer and Randall Philip Garrett
- Mark Phillips (footballer) (born 1982), English footballer
- Mark Phillips (journalist) (born 1948), Canadian television journalist with CBS News
- Mark Phillips (Guyanese politician) (born 1961), former chief of staff of the Guyana Defence Force, current prime minister of Guyana
- Mark Philips (politician) (1800–1873), British politician, MP
- Mark M. Phillips (born 1951), American astronomer
- Mark Phillips, co-founder of RDCWorld

== See also ==
- Marc Phillips (born 1953), Welsh politician
