= Mark Kellogg =

Mark Kellogg may refer to:

- Mark Kellogg (reporter), first Associated Press correspondent to die in the line of duty; killed at the Battle of the Little Bighorn
- Mark Kellogg (musician), principal trombonist of the Rochester Philharmonic Orchestra
- Mark Kellogg (basketball), American women's basketball coach
