= Mark Newman (disambiguation) =

Mark Newman is an English-American physicist.

Mark Newman may also refer to:

- Mark Newman (baseball) (1949–2020), American professional baseball executive
- Mark Newman (educator) (1772–1859), American educator, deacon, and publisher

== See also ==
- Mark Neuman (born 1959), American politician in Alaska
- Mark Neumann (born 1954), American politician in Wisconsin
