= Mark Lawrence =

Mark Lawrence may refer to:

- Mark Lawrence (psychiatrist) (1939–2011), American psychiatrist and CIA profiler
- Mark Lawrence (musician) (active 1974–2007), American trombonist
- Mark Lawrence (bishop) (born 1950), former Bishop of the Diocese of South Carolina
- Mark Lawrence (footballer) (born 1958), English football player
- Mark Lawrence (politician) (born 1958), American politician in Maine
- Mark Lawrence (cricketer) (1962–2010), English cricketer
- Mark Christopher Lawrence (born 1964), American character actor, comedian and voice-over artist
- Mark Lawrence (rugby union) (born 1965), South African former rugby union player and current referee
- Mark Lawrence (author) (born 1966), US/UK fantasy writer
- Mark Lawrence (ice hockey) (born 1972), Canadian ice hockey player
- Mark Lawrence (actor) (active in 2001), British actor
- Mala (musician) (born Mark Lawrence), member of dubstep production duo Digital Mystikz

== See also ==
- Marc Lawrence (1910–2005), American film character actor
- Marc Lawrence (filmmaker) (born 1959), American film director
