= Mark O'Leary =

Mark or Marc O'Leary may refer to:

- Mark O'Leary (cricket coach) (born 1976)
- Mark O'Leary (hurler) (born 1977)
- Marc O'Leary, perpetrator in the Washington and Colorado serial rape cases
