= Mark Sanchez (disambiguation) =

Mark Sanchez (born 1986) is an American former football player.

Mark Sanchez may also refer to:

- Mark Sanchez (basketball) (born 1987), American basketball player
- Mark Sanchez (make-up artist), American make-up artist
- Mark Sanchez (politician), American politician
- Mike Santana (real name Mark Sanchez), American professional wrestler

== See also ==
- Marc Sánchez (born 1992), Spanish swimmer
