= Mark Cleary =

Mark Cleary may refer to:

- Mark Cleary (cricketer) (born 1980), Australian first-class cricketer
- Mark Cleary (professor) (born 1954), current Vice-Chancellor of the University of Bradford in Yorkshire
