= Mark Wakefield =

Mark Wakefield may refer to:

- Mark Wakefield (Xero singer), original lead vocalist of American nu-metal band Xero, which evolved into Linkin Park
- Mark Wakefield (cricketer) (born 1968), cricketer
