= Mark Higgins =

Mark Higgins may refer to:

- Mark Higgins (strength athlete) (born 1963), athlete and strongman
- Mark Higgins (baseball) (1963–2017), baseball player
- Mark Higgins (driver) (born 1971), Manx rally driver
- Mark Higgins (footballer) (born 1958), English former footballer
- Mark Huntington Higgins (1940–1960), American helper of Albert Schweitzer
