= Mark Lynch =

Mark Lynch may refer to:

- Mark Lynch (English footballer) (born 1981), English footballer
- Mark Lynch (Gaelic footballer) (born 1986), Irish Gaelic footballer
- Mark Lynch (politician), American political candidate

See also Marc Lynch.
