= Mark Twain (disambiguation) =

Mark Twain (1835–1910) was an American writer.

Mark Twain may also refer to:

== Places ==
- Mark Twain (crater), a crater on Mercury
- 2362 Mark Twain, a main-belt asteroid
- Mark Twain, St. Louis, a neighborhood of St. Louis, Missouri, U.S.

== Art, entertainment, and media ==
- Mark Twain (film), a 2001 biographical documentary by Ken Burns
- Mark Twain, a Disney riverboat attraction at multiple theme parks
- Mark Twain: The Musical (1987), a stage musical biography by Jane Iredale and William P. Perry
- Mark Twain: Words & Music (2001), a music and spoken-word album
- Mark Twain (book), a non-fiction biography by Ron Chernow

== Other uses ==
- The "Mark Twain", a prototype of the Apple IIGS
- "Mark twain", a nautical term related to the practice of depth sounding
