= Mark Hammond =

Mark Hammond may refer to:

- Mark Hammond (American politician) (born 1963), South Carolina secretary of state
- Mark Hammond (Australian politician) (1844–1908)
- Mark Hammond (director), film producer and director, see Johnny Was
- Mark Hammond, the main character in the video game series The Getaway
- Mark Hammond, a fictional character in Z Nation
- Mark Hammond (admiral), senior officer in the Royal Australian Navy

== See also ==
- Mark Harmon, American actor
