= Mark Morrison (disambiguation) =

Mark Morrison (born 1972) is a British R&B singer.

Mark Morrison may also refer to:

- Mark Morrison (ice hockey, born 1963), Canadian ice hockey player
- Mark Morrison (ice hockey, born 1982), Ice hockey player from Northern Ireland
- Mark Coxon Morrison (1877–1945), British rugby union footballer
