= Mark Sutcliffe (disambiguation) =

Mark Sutcliffe (born 1968) is a former journalist and the 59th mayor of Ottawa.

Mark Sutcliffe may also refer to:

- Mark Sutcliffe, singer and guitarist in the English band Trespass
- Mark Sutcliffe, goalkeeper for the New Zealand Rangers A.F.C.
- Mark Sutcliffe, former CEO of Hong Kong Football Association
