= Mark Sherman =

Mark Sherman may refer to:

- Mark Sherman (collector), American biochemist and string figure enthusiast
- Mark Sherman (musician) (born 1957), jazz vibraphonist, pianist and drummer
