= Mark Singleton =

Mark Singleton may refer to:

- Mark Singleton (actor) (1919–1986), British actor
- Mark Singleton (politician) (1762–1840), politician, Member of the Irish Parliament for Carysfort and of the UK Parliament for Eye
- Mark Singleton, former rhythm guitarist for the rock band Black Veil Brides
- Mark Singleton (yoga scholar) (born 1972), British academic at SOAS studying modern yoga and its origins

== See also ==
- Singleton (disambiguation)
