= Mark Sinclair (disambiguation) =

Mark Sinclair is an American actor better known as Vin Diesel.

Mark Sinclair may also refer to:

== People ==
- Mark Sinclair, 2010 Auckland local elections

== Fictional characters ==
- Mark Sinclair, character in The Alligator People
- Mark Sinclair, character in Enter Inspector Duval
