= Mark Barnett =

Mark Barnett may refer to:

- Mark Barnett (motorcyclist) (born 1960), American motocross racer
- Mark A. Barnett (born 1963), American judge
- Mark Barnett (lawyer) (born 1954), American attorney
