= Mark Driscoll (disambiguation) =

Mark Driscoll (born 1970) is an American megachurch pastor.

Mark or Marc Driscoll may also refer to:

- Mark Driscoll (American football) (born 1953), American football player and college athletics administrator
- Mark Driscoll (screenwriter) (born 1959), American screenwriter
- Mark Driscoll, a character in 90210 played by Blake Hood
- Mark Driscoll, a character in Darkness Falls
