= Mark Washington =

Mark Washington may refer to:

- Mark Washington (Canadian football) (born 1973), defensive coordinator for the Hamilton Tiger-Cats
- Mark Washington (linebacker) (born 1985), American football player
- Mark Washington (cornerback) (born 1947), American football cornerback
