= Mark Wallington =

Mark Wallington may refer to:

- Mark Wallington (footballer) (born 1952), English football goalkeeper
- Mark Wallington (writer) (born 1953), author and broadcaster
