= Mark Rose =

Mark Rose may refer to:

- Mark Rose (politician) (1924–2008), Canadian politician
- Mark Rose, musician associated with the band Spitalfield
