= Mark Alan Smith =

American serial killer and rapist

- Born: June 27, 1949 (age 77); Chicago, Illinois, U.S.
- Other names: "The State's Forgotten Serial Killer"; Remington Steele
- Convictions: Illinois; Murder (3 counts); Attempted escape Arkansas; First degree murder
- Penalty: Illinois; 463 to 518 years imprisonment Arkansas; Life imprisonment

Details
- Victims: 4–12+
- Span of crimes: 1969–1970
- Country: United States; possibly West Germany and elsewhere
- States: Arkansas, Illinois, and possibly others
- Imprisoned at: Danville Correctional Center, Danville, Illinois

Mark Alan Smith (born June 27, 1949) is an American serial killer who killed at least four women in Illinois and Arkansas during the 1960s, and was sentenced to 500 years' imprisonment for three of the deaths. Smith later confessed to killing eight women while stationed as a soldier in West Germany, for which he was never prosecuted, and authorities believe he could be involved in other murders, both in the US and overseas.

== Early life ==
Smith was born at the Illinois Masonic Hospital, to marine Charles Gilbert Smith and Delores Rechlin, who had another four children. The couple separated when Mark was 2 to 3 years old, with his mother receiving primary custody. At the age of 7, his mother remarried, and the family moved out to McHenry County, Illinois, where Smith grew up. He attended the local grade school, but anger issues and the difficulty of adjusting to a new locale resulted in his return to Chicago.

A year later, while a student at Edgebrook Public School, Smith attempted to strangle a female classmate behind the school building. One year after that, he stabbed a 6-year-old playmate with a pen knife more than 20 times. The boy managed to survive, and Mark was sent off to a psychiatrist.

In 1966, Smith was enlisted in the Army during the Vietnam War and stationed in West Germany, where, in 1967, he was court-martialed for assaulting four African-American colleagues. After three years in the army, he returned to the US, settling in McHenry County.

== Murders ==
=== Obie Fay Ash ===
On December 3, 1969, Smith abducted 32-year-old Obie Fay Ash of Cotter, before proceeding to rape and strangle her. After ensuring she was deceased, he repeatedly stabbed her. All of this occurred in the nearby city of Mountain Home, where Smith worked as a handyman at a TV repair shop. When she was deceased, Smith tied Ash up with wire, placed her in the backseat of her own car, and drove the car near to the repair shop. Ash's body was discovered later the same day. Ash left behind three children. Smith later admitted Ash's murder in a bench trial.

=== Jean Bianchi ===
On January 27, 1970, the 27-year-old housewife and mother of two Jean Bianchi, from McHenry, was last seen at a local laundromat on Elm Street. In the evening, she had phoned her husband to inform him that she would come home shortly, but she didn't return. Bianchi's laundry and an unfinished letter were all located at the laundromat, with no sign of her. Three days later, her body was found in a partially frozen creek near one of the town's bridges, having been sexually assaulted and stabbed multiple times.

After chancing upon her, Smith forced Bianchi into his car at knifepoint, whereupon he repeatedly stabbed and raped her. He then drove outside of town and dumped the body in a local stream, but as he was leaving, he saw that she was trying to climb up an embankment and escape. He quickly caught up with her, and inserted his fist up her vagina. Then, he pulled her shirt over her head and continued stabbing Bianchi, to the point where he could clearly hear that her lungs had collapsed. After assuring himself she had died, Smith dumped the body into the stream again, where it was later found at the creek.

=== Janice Bolyard ===
On February 27, 1970, Smith was working at the Resin Research Laboratory, part of the Desoto Chemical Company, situated in Des Plaines. He was left to work in the late evening hours, along with 22-year-old Janice Bolyard, from Evanston. Taking the opportunity to follow her into the basement, Smith began making sexual advances on her, which Bolyard resisted. Infuriated, he began beating her, before choking her into unconsciousness. Smith then moved her to another room, where he took off her undergarments and tampon, before proceeding to rape her. After he had finished, he took her pantyhose and wrapped it around her neck, strangling her to death. She was discovered on the next day, after she'd been reported missing by her fiancé.

=== Jean Lingenfelter ===
On May 27, 1970, 17-year-old Jean Ann Lingenfelter, an honors student at McHenry's local high school who had triple-dated with Mark Smith at the school prom, left her home so she could study at a friend's house, as she was only a week away from graduation. After two hours, she left the house so she could meet Smith, and was last seen entering his vehicle. After she did not return home, her parents reported her missing. The next day, her naked body was found by a young couple on a beach, lying motionless at the Lakeland Park subdivision. Her body showed signs of rape, severe beating and strangulation, as well as sexual assault of her vagina and rectum.

Smith admitted that he raped and strangled Lingenfelter, later inserting a beer bottle in both her vagina and rectum after she had died. He then put the lifeless body in the trunk of his car, and dumped the body at McCullom Lake.

=== Suspected ===
Aside from these murders, Smith himself confessed to killing between three and eight women in West Germany during his enlistment, which he later recanted to just two. German authorities never prosecuted him for these alleged killings, despite his confessions being credible.

The prosecutors at his trial alleged that his victim count likely exceeds 20 in number, but because his crimes covered a two-year period over a large geographic area, they were largely ignored. Authorities have questioned him regarding murders in South Vietnam, South Korea, five other states and in Washington, D.C., as well as the still-unsolved 1966 Kenilworth murder of 21-year-old Valerie Percy, daughter of businessman and Republican politician Charles H. Percy.

== Capture, trial and imprisonment ==
The murders of Bianchi and Lingenfelter had shocked the population of McHenry, and large amounts of people aided in the search for the killer—one of them being Mark Alan Smith himself. He was arrested and charged with murder, after he discovered Lingenfelter's body "by accident", with surprising accuracy. He was interviewed shortly after his arrest, where he displayed cold-blooded indifference towards the victim. Additionally, prosecutors recalled a quote from an earlier parole hearing, where he claimed that "everybody has got to die sometime".

He later confessed to the two killings, as well as those of Ash and Bolyard. He was sentenced to 500 years' imprisonment for the Illinois murders in 1971. He dodged the death penalty, as there was a moratorium for it at the time.

On April 27, 1977, Smith was caught trying to escape from the Pontiac Correctional Center through the boiler room, to which he later pleaded guilty and was given another 18 years. While serving his time, Smith's defense attorney, Harold C. McKenney, aided by Jon K. Hahn, helped Smith co-author a book, titled "Legally Sane", in which Mark described his life and crime spree in vivid detail, where he also admits the killings in Germany.

He now claims to be a changed man who can reintegrate into society, having chosen a new identity for himself—Remington Steele. Every 3 years, he has a mandatory hearing for parole, but he claims to know that being released is unlikely. Even if he was to be released, he would have to be transferred to Arkansas, where he will serve a life sentence for the killing of Obie Fay Ash. Smith currently remains incarcerated at Pontiac, where he earns an income through selling oil paintings to guards, and is currently studying for his third college degree.

== See also ==
- List of serial killers in the United States

== Bibliography ==
- Jon K. Hahn and Harold C. McKenney (1972). Legally Sane. Henry Rengery Company.
