= Mark Waddington (magician) =

British magician

Mark Waddington (born 4 June 1989 in Keighley, West Yorkshire, England), is a British comedy magician who currently resides in Skipton, North Yorkshire, England. He was voted "Best in the UK" for 2008. He specialises in close up magic.

== Career ==
Waddington has worked as a comedy magician since the age of 12 when he made his professional debut at The City Varieties Music Hall in Leeds.

He supported magician Paul Zenon during his Stand-up show, as well as performing his own comedy magic act with Jimmy Cricket, Johnnie Casson, Bobby Knutt, Gorden Kaye, and others. He has appeared in the media many times and TV appearances include Channel 4, ITV and BBC. He has also made many appearances on the radio as a magician, including Fresh Radio, BCB Radio, BBC Radio Leeds, BBC Radio York, BBC Radio Sheffield and BBC Radio 1.

Waddington also works as a specialised magic consultant for TV production. He acted as a magic consultant for ITV's Emmerdale, assisting recurring character Rodney to perform magic within the soap.

== Awards ==
Waddington was crowned the First Place winner of Starnow UK talent search in [2008].

He became a member of The Magic Circle in May 2009.

In April 2019, his membership to The Magic Circle was reviewed, and he was promoted to an Associate of the Inner Magic Circle (AIMC).

Waddington has been awarded the ‘Best Entertainment’ at the North of England Wedding Awards, in 2014, 2016 and 2017.
