= Mark Powell =

Mark Powell may refer to:

- Mark Powell (clothing designer) (born 1960), British fashion designer
- Mark Powell (photographer) (born 1968), American photographer
- Mark Powell (footballer) (born 1984), Australian footballer
- Mark Powell (cricketer, born 1972), former English cricketer
- Mark Powell (cricketer, born 1980), English cricketer for Northamptonshire, 2000–2004
- Mark Powell (novelist) (born 1976), American novelist
- Mark Powell (American football) (born 1992), American football coach
- Mark Allan Powell (born 1953), professor of theology
