= Mark Curtis =

Mark Curtis may refer to:

- Mark Curtis (broadcaster) (born 1959), American TV journalist, author and political analyst
- Mark Curtis (British author), British political author
- Mark Curtis (SWP member) (born 1959), former American Socialist Worker's Party member
- Mark Curtis, ring name used by professional wrestling referee Brian Hildebrand
