= Mark Carter =

Mark Carter may refer to:

- Mark Carter (rugby) (born 1968), New Zealand former rugby football player
- Mark Carter (footballer) (born 1960), English former footballer
- Mark Bonham Carter, Baron Bonham-Carter (1922–1994), English publisher and politician
