= Mark Goodwin =

Mark Goodwin may refer to:

- Mark Goodwin (footballer) (born 1960), English footballer
- Mark Goodwin (musician) (born 1986), American drummer
