= Mark Coyne =

Mark Coyne may refer to:

- Mark Coyne (musician) (born 1962), American musician and original member of the band The Flaming Lips
- Mark Coyne (rugby league) (born 1967), Australian rugby league footballer
