= Mark Schroeder =

Mark Schroeder may refer to:

- Mark Schroeder (philosopher), American philosopher
- Mark G. Schroeder, president of the Wisconsin Evangelical Lutheran Synod
- Mark J. F. Schroeder (born 1955), American politician
