= Mark Kendrick =

Mark Kendrick may refer to:

- Mark Kendrick, character in the 1954 film The House Across the Lake
- Mark Kendrick, instrument builder, used by Masami Shiratama
