= Mark Hudson =

Mark Hudson may refer to:

- Sir Mark Hudson (businessman) (born 1947), former Chairman of the Council of the Duchy of Lancaster
- Mark Hudson (author), winner of the NCR Book Award
- Mark Hudson (musician) (born 1951), record producer, musician and songwriter
- Mark Hudson (footballer, born 1980), English footballer
- Mark Hudson (footballer, born 1982), English footballer
- Mark J. Hudson (born 1963), anthropologist specializing in Japan
- Marc Hudson, lead singer for the English power metal band DragonForce
