= Mark Day =

Mark Day may refer to:

- Mark Day (racing driver) (born 1961), American racecar driver
- Mark Day (actor) (born 1978), Canadian actor
- Mark Day (film editor) (born 1958), British film editor
- Mark Day (singer), Canadian Idol season 6 contestant
- Mark Day (musician), member of the Happy Mondays
