= Mark Feldman (drummer) =

American drummer

- Origin: Manhattan, New York
- Genres: Progressive rock; Jazz fusion; Jazz; Funk; Rock
- Occupations: Drummer; Drum educator; Entrepreneur; Music executive
- Years active: 1984–present
- Labels: Mutant Cat; A&M
- Website: www.markfeldman.org

Mark Feldman is an American drummer, drum educator, entrepreneur, and former music executive from Manhattan, New York. He is currently the drummer and leader of the four-piece band called Mark Feldman's Level5. The band released its debut EP, The Sybil EP, in February 2019 on Mutant Cat Records. Feldman is also the founder of the Manhattan-based BANG! The Drum School. He was formerly a marketing executive for the Sony Music imprints, Columbia Records and Legacy Recordings.

== Early life and education ==
Feldman was born and grew up in the Chelsea neighborhood of Manhattan. He first started playing drums when he was 13. He attended Cornell University where he studied economics and also played drums in a student band called The Naked Eye. After completing his undergraduate degree in 1984, he later earned an MBA from Columbia University.

== Career ==
In the 1980s, Feldman played drums in Hearts and Minds, a band that was signed to A&M Records. The group toured together and recorded an album at John Mellencamp's studio in Bloomington, Indiana. Feldman was also mentored by drummer, Kenny Aronoff, at that time. The band was ultimately dropped from the label, which prompted Feldman to attend Columbia University.

In 1987, Feldman submitted a drum solo to Modern Drummer's first ever drum solo competition. The contest was judged by Rush drummer, Neil Peart. Peart selected Feldman's solo as one of the top 3 out of over 1,700 submissions. His prize was Peart's chrome Slingerland drum kit (colloquially referred to as "Chromey") that was used on early Rush tours and on the album, 2112.

After graduating from Columbia University, Feldman worked at Sony Music in a variety of marketing roles at its subsidiary labels. In 1996, he earned the title of Associate Director of Marketing at Legacy Recordings and was promoted to Senior Director of Marketing there in 1999. In the early to mid-2000s, he worked as the Vice President of Jazz Marketing for Columbia Records. Over the course of his career with Sony, Feldman promoted numerous acts including John Mellencamp, Elton John, Billy Joel, Paul McCartney, and David Bowie (as part of the album release for the post-9/11 Concert for New York City), as well as Bob Dylan, Pink Floyd, Aerosmith, Chris Botti, The Bad Plus, The Derek Trucks Band, David Sánchez, and Steve Tyrell (among numerous others).

In 2006, he quit his job at Columbia Records to refocus on drumming. He rented out a drum studio in Williamsburg, Brooklyn and practiced there 7 hours per day for nearly 4 years. After some time, other drummers expressed interest in being taught by Feldman. In 2009, Feldman took Neil Peart's "Chromey" drum kit he won in 1987 out of storage, had it restored, and sold it on eBay for $25,000. He used that money to start his drumming school called "BANG! The Drum School", originally based in Brooklyn and, since 2012, in Manhattan. The school provides instruction for drummers of all skill levels and ages.

In around 2014, he recorded a video of himself playing Soundgarden's "Black Rain" as an audition after the band's drummer, Matt Cameron, opted to tour with Pearl Jam. The band's manager considered Feldman before choosing someone closer to the band. In 2016, Feldman started the progressive rock band called Mark Feldman's Level5 whose first EP release features Feldman himself on drums, Will Lee on bass, Oz Noy on guitar, and Adam Klipple on keys. The band's first songs were composed by Noy and named by Feldman and contained elements of funk and jazz.

In February 2019, the band released a 3-track EP called The Sybil EP on Mutant Cat Records.

== Discography ==
=== EPs ===
List of EPs with selected details
Title	Details
The Sybil EP (as a member of Mark Feldman's Level5)	Released: February 22, 2019 (US); Label: Mutant Cat; Formats: CD, Digital download
