= Mark Birch =

Mark Birch may refer to:

- Mark Birch (musician), English rock guitarist
- Mark Birch (footballer) (born 1977), English footballer
- Mark Birch (jockey) (1949–2016), British jockey
- Mark Birch (priest) (born 1970), British Anglican priest and chaplain
