= Mark Gordon (disambiguation) =

Mark Gordon (born 1957) is the 33rd governor of the U.S. state of Wyoming.

Mark Gordon may also refer to:

- Mark Gordon (producer) (born 1956), American television and film producer
  - The Mark Gordon Company, a film production company owned by the producer
- Mark Gordon (actor) (1926–2010), American film and television actor
- Mark Gordon (bridge), American bridge player
- Mark C. Gordon, first dean and president of the Mitchell Hamline School of Law
- Mark S. Gordon (born 1942), professor of chemistry at Iowa State University
- Mark Gordon, a character from the TV series Highway to Heaven
- Mark Gordon, British-American man who notably disappeared with Constance Marten in early 2023

== See also ==
- Marc Gordon (1935–2010), American record producer
- Gord Mark, Canadian ice hockey player
