= Mark Howe (disambiguation) =

Mark Howe is an ice hockey player.

Mark Howe may also refer to:

- Mark Antony De Wolfe Howe (bishop) (1808–1895), first Bishop of the Episcopal Diocese of Central Pennsylvania
- Mark Antony De Wolfe Howe (writer) (1864–1960), his son, American editor and author
- Mark Antony DeWolfe Howe (historian), his son, Harvard law professor, historian, biographer and civil rights leader
