= Mark Dawson (disambiguation) =

Mark Dawson (born 1960) is a British-American entertainment manager

Mark Dawson may also refer to:

- Mark Dawson (footballer) (born 1953), Australian rules footballer
- Mark Dawson (writer), English author
- Mark Dawson (cricketer)
