= Mark Gross =

Mark Gross may refer to:

- Mark Gross (mathematician) (born 1965), American mathematician
- Mark Gross (musician) (born 1966), American jazz saxophonist
