= Mark Ritchie =

Mark Ritchie may refer to:

- Mark Ritchie (politician), Minnesota secretary of state, 2007–2015
- Mark Ritchie (pinball designer) (born 1958), American pinball designer
- Mark Ritchie (trader) (born 1956), American commodities trader
