= Mark Bright (disambiguation) =

Mark Bright (born 1962) is an English footballer and sports pundit.

Mark Bright may also refer to:

- Mark Bright (record producer) (born 1959), American country music producer and songwriter
- Mark Bright (rugby union) (born 1978), New Zealand-born rugby union player
- M. D. Bright (1955–2024), American comic book and storyboard artist
- March Bright, a fictional character in the soap opera Coronation Street
