= Mark O'Connor (disambiguation) =

Mark O'Connor is American composer and fiddler.

Mark O'Connor may refer to:

- Mark O'Connor (English footballer) (born 1963), British professional footballer
- Mark O'Connor (Gaelic footballer), for Cork
- Mark O'Connor (sportsman) (born 1997), Australian rules and Gaelic footballer
- Mark O'Connor (poet) (born 1945), Australian poet and writer
