= Mark McMahon =

Mark McMahon may refer to:

- Mark McMahon (American football) (1878–1947), American University of Oklahoma football coach
- Mark McMahon (bowls) (born 1970), Scottish bowls player
