= Mark Hildreth =

Mark Hildreth is the name of:

- Mark Hildreth (actor) (born 1978), Canadian actor
- Mark Hildreth (born 1959), American former wrestler known by his ring name Van Hammer
