= Mark Chua =

Mark Chua may refer to:

- Mark Chua, Singaporean businessman who was implicated in the 2017 Ilocos Norte Tobacco Excise Tax funds controversy
- Mark Welson Chua, Filipino student of the University of Santo Tomas who exposed alleged irregularities in the Reserve Officers' Training Corps unit of the university; see Death of Mark Chua
