= Mark Christensen =

Mark Christensen may refer to:

- Mark B. Christensen, label owner and mastering engineer
- Mark R. Christensen (born 1962), Nebraska state senator
- Mark Christensen (basketball) (born 1955), American basketball player
- Mark Christensen (rugby league) (born 1982), Australian rugby league player
- Mark Christensen (soccer) (born 1960), American soccer player
- Mark Christensen, filmmaker known for films such as Box Head Revolution
- Mark Christensen, competitor in the Transpacific Yacht Race

== See also ==
- Mark Christiansen (born 1963), retired badminton player from Denmark
