= Mark O'Shea =

Mark O'Shea may refer to:

- Mark O'Shea (herpetologist) (born 1956)
- Mark O'Shea (musician) (born 1977)
