= Mark Preston =

Mark Preston may refer to:

- Mark Preston (businessman) (born 1968), Australian businessman and motorsport professional
- Mark Preston (judoka) (born 1966), Scottish judoka
- Mark Preston (political analyst) (born 1971), American CNN senior political analyst and Executive Editor, CNN Politics
- Mark Preston (rugby) (born 1967), English rugby league and rugby union player
