= Mark Hogan =

Mark Hogan may refer to:

- Mark Anthony Hogan (1931–2017), Lieutenant Governor of Colorado, 1967–1971
- Mark Hogan of the band Hogan
