= Mark Judge =

Mark Judge may refer to:

- Mark Judge (architect) (1847–1927), British architect and civil engineer
- Mark Judge (writer) (born 1964), American author and journalist
