= Mark Wallberg =

Mark Wallberg may refer to:

- Mark Wahlberg (born 1971), American actor and rapper
- Mark L. Walberg (born 1962), American television performer
