= Mark Hollis (disambiguation) =

Mark Hollis (1955–2019), was an English musician.

Mark Hollis may also refer to:

- Mark Hollis (album) (1998)
- Mark Hollis (athletic director) (born 1962), American athletic director
- Mark Hollis (athlete) (born 1984), American pole vaulter
- Mark D. Hollis, director of the Centers for Disease Control and Prevention
