= Mark Beyer (novelist) =

American writer

- Born: September 8, 1963 (age 63)
- Occupations: Journalist; Novelist

Academic work
- Institutions: Columbia College Chicago

Mark Beyer (born September 8, 1963) is an American novelist, journalist and educator. He is originally from Franklin Park, Illinois, a suburb of Chicago. He is noted for his novel The Village Wit, a story of "deception, betrayal, and dark passion."

Beyer got his start as an author by writing children's and Young Adult books for the Rosen Publishing Group, including two biographies of World War II figures, Heinrich Müller: Gestapo Chief, and Emmanuel Ringelblum: Historian of the Warsaw Ghetto. The books were described by the Association of Jewish Libraries as "... works of distinction. Worthwhile additions to Holocaust biographies." He has previously taught literature and fiction writing at Columbia College Chicago, worked as an editor in New York City, and then became a news features writer in New Port Richey, Florida. Beyer currently lives in Europe, where he writes and teaches English as a foreign language to business professionals.

The Village Wit was published in 2010 by Siren & Muse Publishing.
