= Mark Scanlon =

Mark Scanlon may refer to:

- Mark Scanlon (cyclist) (born 1980), Irish cyclist
- Mark Scanlon (surfer), Australian surfer
