= Mark Tandy =

Mark Tandy is the name of:

- Mark Tandy (actor) (born 1957), Irish film and television actor
- Mark Tandy (footballer) (1892–1965), member of the Australian Football Hall of Fame
- Mark Tandy (RAN officer), current Royal Australian Navy officer, and former Warrant Officer of the Navy
