= Mark Gertler =

Mark Gertler may refer to:

- Mark Gertler (artist) (1891–1939), British portrait and landscape painter
- Mark Gertler (economist) (born 1951), American economist
