= Mark Porter =

Mark Porter may refer to:

- Mark Porter (designer) (born 1960), British publication art director
- Mark Porter (anaesthetist) (born 1962), British consultant anaesthetist and chairman of the British Medical Association
- Mark Porter (general practitioner) (born 1962), British television and radio presenter, and GP
- Mark Porter (racing driver) (1975–2006), V8 Supercar driver killed in a crash at Bathurst
- Mark Porter (footballer) (born 1976), Australian rules footballer for Carlton and North Melbourne
- Mark Porter (writer) (born 1960), Scottish based travel writer and publisher
