= Mark Isherwood =

Mark Isherwood may refer to:

- Mark Isherwood (ice hockey) (born 1989), Canadian ice hockey defenceman
- Mark Isherwood (politician) (born 1959), Conservative politician
