= Mark Benson (disambiguation) =

Mark Benson (born 1958) is an English former cricketer and umpire.

Mark Benson may also refer to:

- Mark Benson (engineer) (1888–1965), inventor of a supercritical boiler
- Mark Benson (actor) in The Lost Boys
- Marc Benson, soccer player in 2008 PDL season
