= Mark Morgan =

Mark Morgan may refer to:

- Mark Morgan (composer) (born 1961), American musician and composer
- Mark Morgan (cricketer) (born 1980), English cricketer
- Mark Morgan (producer), American film producer
- Mark A. Morgan, former acting commissioner of U.S. Customs and Border Protection
- Mark Morgan (swimmer), Australian swimmer
