= Mark O'Keefe =

Mark O'Keefe may refer to:

- Mark O'Keefe (politician) (born 1952), American politician in Montana
- Mark O'Keefe (screenwriter) (fl. 1990s–2000s), comedy screenwriter
