= Mark Rutherford =

Mark Rutherford may refer to:

- Mark Rutherford (composer), musician, composer and producer
- Hale White (1831–1913), writer who used the pen name Mark Rutherford
- Mark Rutherford (footballer) (born 1972), English footballer
- Mark Rutherford School, Bedford, England
