= Mark Hawthorne =

Mark Hawthorne may refer to:

- Mark Hawthorne (footballer) (born 1973), Scottish former footballer
- Mark Hawthorne (umpire) (born 1962), Irish cricket umpire
- Mark Hawthorne (author) (born 1962), American writer and animal activist
- Hate Man or Mark Hawhorne (1936–2017), American writer and philosopher
