= Mark Kendall (engineer) =

Australian biomedical engineer and scientist (born 1972)

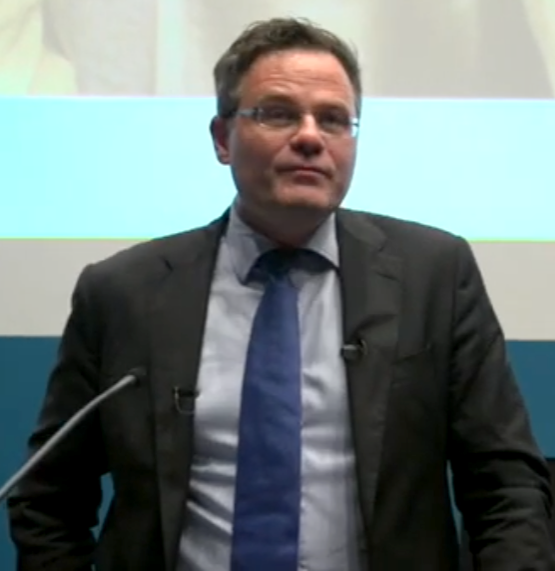
- In an ANU video in 2018
- Born: 16 April 1972 (age 54)
- Occupation: Biomedical engineer
- Employer: Australian National University
- Known for: Biomedical invention

Mark A. F. Kendall (born 1972) is an Australian biomedical engineer, inventor and entrepreneur.

He is founder and CEO of WearOptimo Pty Ltd and the Vice-Chancellor's Entrepreneurial Professor at the Australian National University.

Kendall is co-chair of the $150 million Australian Stem Cell Therapies Mission and on the World Economic Forum Global Future Council on Biotechnology.

Kendall's contributions to innovation in global healthcare has been recognised with more than forty awards. These include:

- World Economic Forum Technology Pioneer (2015).
- Fellow of ATSE; Australian Academy of Technological Sciences and Engineering (2017).

Kendall is a CSL Young Florey Medallist and Rolex Laureate.

Kendall's work has appeared in media, including on the National Geographic Channel.

Kendall's TedGlobal talk has been viewed more than a million times.

== Background ==
Kendall was born on 16 April 1972. He received his Bachelor of Engineering (1993) and PhD (1998) from the University of Queensland.

In 1998, Kendall moved to the UK to take up a position in the Department of Engineering Science at the University of Oxford (1998–2006).

== Contributions to biotechnology ==
At the University of Oxford (1998–2006) Kendall developed a biolistic technique for the delivery of vaccines directly into the skin without the use of needles.

At the University of Queensland (2006–2018) Kendall invented the Nanopatch for needle-free delivery of vaccines.

At WearOptimo and the Australian National University (2018 to present), Kendall has invented the Microwearable™ sensor for personalised medicine.

During his career, Kendall has collaborated with major global health partners including the Bill & Melinda Gates Foundation, World Health Organization and Merck & Co.

He is an Australian Government Academy of Science COVID-19 Expert.

== Selected awards, honours and prizes ==
- Elected to the World Economic Forum Global Future Council on Biotechnology (2019 to present).
- Elected Fellow of the Australian Academy of Technology and Engineering ATSE (2017).
- CSL Young Florey Medal (2016).
- Dr John Dixon Hughes Medal for Medical Research Innovation (2016).
- World Economic Forum Technology Pioneer (2015).
- Rolex Laureate Award for Enterprise (2012) for his "pioneering efforts to expand knowledge and improve human life".
- 2011 Australian Innovation Challenge winner.
- 2011 Eureka Prize for Interdisciplinary Research.
- 2010 Merck Translational Research Excellence Commercialisation Award.

== Contributions to biotech companies ==
Kendall founded Vaxxas in 2011 to advance his Nanopatch technology for global impact, securing more than $40 million of investment, in the series A ($15m) and B (in excess of $25m) rounds. The Nanopatch technology has been licensed to Merck & Co. He was the Vaxxas Chief Technology Officer, Director, and Chair of the Vaxxas Advisory Board (2011–2015).

In 2018, Kendall founded WearOptimo, and is its CEO.
