= Mark Sorenson =

Mark Sorenson may refer to:

- Mark Sorenson (rugby union) (born 1979), New Zealand rugby union player
- Mark Sorenson (softball), New Zealand softballer
