= Mark Everett =

Mark Everett may refer to:

- Mark Oliver Everett (born 1963), musician
- Mark Everett (runner) (born 1968), American 800 meters athlete
- Manuel Benitez (1969–2008), child-actor whose stage name was Mark Everett
- Mark Everett (cricketer) (born 1967), former English cricketer

== See also ==
- Mark Everett Fuller, U.S. judge
