= Mark Burnett (disambiguation) =

Mark Burnett is a British television producer.

Mark Burnett may also refer to:

- Mark Burnett (cricketer) (born 1970), Guyanese cricketer
- Mark Burnett, baseball player who played in 1999 Southeastern Conference baseball tournament
- Mark Burnett, lacrosse player who played for Charlotte Copperheads
- Mark Burnett Productions, owned by the British television producer
