= Mark Sullivan =

Mark Sullivan may refer to:

- Mark J. Sullivan, director of the United States Secret Service, 2006–2013
- Mark Sullivan (cricketer) (born 1964), South African cricketer
- Mark T. Sullivan (born 1958), American author of mystery and suspense novels
- Mark Sullivan (judge) (1911–2001), justice on the New Jersey Supreme Court, 1973–1981
- Mark Sullivan (public servant), former secretary of the Australian Government Department of Veterans' Affairs
- Mark Sullivan, founder Snowboard Magazine
- Mark Sullivan, keyboardist for several California bands including Toiling Midgets
- Mark Sullivan, chief scientist for Eagle Eye Technologies, Inc, later SkyBitz
- Mark Sullivan (visual effects artist), Academy Award nominated visual effects artist
- Mark Sullivan (American football), American football coach
- Mark Sullivan (journalist) (1874–1952), American political commentator
- Mark Sullivan (runner), winner of the 1988 4 × 800 meter relay at the NCAA Division I Indoor Track and Field Championships

== See also ==
- Marc Sullivan (born 1958), baseball player
