= Mark Kaplan =

Mark Kaplan may refer to:

- Mark Kaplan (musician) (born 1953), American violinist
- Mark Kaplan (tennis) (born 1967), South African tennis player
- Mark E. Kaplan (born 1967), Florida politician
- Mark N. Kaplan, American lawyer and business executive
