= Mark Savage =

Mark Savage may refer to:

- Mark Savage (Australian film director) (born 1962), Australian film and television screenwriter and film director
- Mark Savage (American playwright), American playwright, songwriter, and theatre director
- Mark Savage (Hollyoaks), "Dodger" Savage, television character
- Mark Savage, BBC music correspondent
