= Mark Hoffman (disambiguation) =

Mark Hoffman is a character in the movie franchise Saw.

Mark Hoffmann, Mark Hofmann, or Mark Hofman may also refer to:

- Mark Hofmann (born 1954), a convicted American murderer, counterfeiter and forger
- Marc Hoffmann (sex offender) (born 1973), a convicted German sex offender and murderer
- Marc Hoffman (born 1961), an American concert composer
- Marc Hoffmann (Inspector Rex), a character in the TV series Inspector Rex
