= Mark Shaw =

Mark Shaw may refer to:

- Mark Shaw (lawyer) (born 1945), American lawyer and investigative reporter; see Johnnie Ray § Personal life
- Mark Shaw (photographer) (1921–1969), American fashion and celebrity photographer
- Mark Shaw (rugby union) (born 1956), former New Zealand rugby union footballer
- Mark Shaw (singer) (born 1961), British singer of the band Then Jerico
- Mark R. Shaw (1889–1978), U.S. Prohibition Party member
- Mark Jeffrey Shaw (born 1958), Children Of Gabi Shaw wife of Candi Milo

== Fictional people ==
- Mark Shaw (Manhunter), comic book character
