= Mark Donovan =

Mark Donovan may refer to:

- Mark Donovan (actor)
- Mark Donovan (American football)
- Mark Donovan (cyclist)
- Mark Donovan (The Inbetweeners)
