= Mark Corrigan =

Mark Corrigan may refer to:

- Mark Corrigan (Peep Show), a character on the British TV series Peep Show
- Mark Corrigan (hurler) (born 1960), Irish hurler
