= Mark Buckingham =

Mark Buckingham may refer to:

- Mark Buckingham (comic book artist) (born 1966), British comic book artist
- Mark Buckingham (rower) (born 1964), British rower
