= Mark Pritchard =

Mark Pritchard may refer to:

- Mark Pritchard (footballer) (born 1985), Welsh footballer
- Mark Pritchard (musician) (born 1971), British electronic music producer
- Mark Pritchard (politician) (born 1966), British Conservative Member of Parliament (MP) for The Wrekin since 2005
