= Mark Fuller =

Mark Fuller may refer to:

- Mark Fuller (judge), American judge in Alabama
- Mark W. Fuller, president and founder of WET Design
- Mark Fuller (wrestler) (born 1961), American amateur wrestler
- Mark Fuller (squash player) (born 1985), English squash player
- Mark B. Fuller, American businessman and academic
- Mark Fuller, musician in Thinking Plague
