= Mark Jenkins =

Mark Jenkins may refer to:

- Mark Jenkins (artist) (born 1970), American artist
- Mark Jenkins (musician) (born 1960), British musician and music writer
- Mark Jenkins (actor) (born 1943), American actor

== See also ==
- Mark Jenkin (born 1976), British filmmaker
- Mark Jenkinson (born 1982), British politician
