= Mark Osborne =

Mark Osborne may refer to:

- Mark Osborne (cricketer) (born 1961), Australian cricketer
- Mark Osborne (ice hockey) (born 1961), Canadian ice hockey player
- Mark Osborne (filmmaker) (born 1970), American film director

== See also ==
- Mark Osborn (born 1981), footballer
