= Mark Hardy =

Mark Hardy may refer to:

- Mark A. Hardy, Columbia University surgeon
- Mark Hardy (actor), actor in the 1988 Dr Who serial Silver Nemesis
- Mark Hardy (baseball) (born 1988), Canadian baseball player
- Mark Hardy (ice hockey) (born 1959), Swiss-born Canadian hockey player
