= Mark Stone (disambiguation) =

Mark Stone (born 1992) is a Canadian ice hockey player.

Mark Stone may also refer to:

- Mark Kennedy (police officer) (born 1969), former Metropolitan Police officer in the UK, known undercover as Mark Stone
- Mark Stone (baritone) (born 1969), British baritone
- Mark Stone (journalist) (born 1979), British journalist for Sky News
- Mark Stone (politician) (born 1957), California politician
- Mark Stone (EastEnders), fictional character
- Mark Stone: MIA Hunter, a series of men's adventure novels
- Mark Stone, original bassist of rock band Van Halen
