= Mark Carlson =

Mark Carlson may refer to:

- Mark Carlson (composer) (born 1952), musician
- Mark Carlson (engineer) (born 1955), software engineer
- Mark Carlson (ice hockey) (born 1969), American ice hockey coach
- Mark Carlson (offensive tackle) (born 1963), player for the 1987 Washington Redskins
- Mark Carlson (quarterback), American football player
- Mark Carlson (umpire) (born 1969), American baseball umpire
