= Mark Brandenburg =

Mark Brandenburg may refer to:

- Mark Brandenburg (baseball) (born 1970), American baseball pitcher
- Mark Brandenburg (politician) (born 1955), American politician in Iowa
- FV Mark Brandenburg, a German fishing trawler in service 1921–1930

== See also ==
- Gau March of Brandenburg (German: Mark Brandenburg), a district within the Free State of Prussia under Nazi Germany
- Margraviate of Brandenburg (German: Markgrafschaft Brandenburg), a major principality of the Holy Roman Empire
- Brandenburg (surname)
