= Mark Killilea =

Mark Killilea may refer to:

- Mark Killilea Snr (1896–1970), Irish Fianna Fáil Party politician, TD and Senator
- His son Mark Killilea Jnr (born 1939), also an Irish Fianna Fáil Party politician, TD and Senator and MEP
