= Mark Duffy =

Mark Duffy may refer to:

- Mark Duffy (banker), Irish banker
- Mark Duffy (footballer) (born 1985), English footballer
- Mark Duffy (politician), Irish politician
