= Mark Rosenzweig =

Mark Rosenzweig may refer to:

- Mark Rosenzweig (economist), development economist at Yale University
- Mark Rosenzweig (psychologist) (1922–2009), American psychologist and pioneer of research on animal neuroplasticity
