= Mark Walton =

Mark Walton may refer to:

- Mark Walton (story artist) (born 1968), story artist and voice actor at Walt Disney Feature Animation
- Mark Walton (musician) (born 1957), New Zealand born clarinettist, saxophonist, composer, arranger, and musical educator
- Mark Walton (footballer) (born 1969), former professional footballer
- Mark Walton (American football) (born 1997), American football player
- Mark Walton (bowls) (born 1967), English lawn bowler
