= Mark Payne =

Mark Payne may refer to:

- Mark Payne (make-up artist) (born 1965), makeup artist, filmmaker and author
- Mark Payne (footballer) (born 1960), English former footballer
- Mark Payne (basketball) (born 1988), American basketball player
