= Mark Chamberlain (disambiguation) =

Mark Chamberlain can refer to:

- Mark Chamberlain (born 1961), English footballer
- Mark Chamberlain (boxer) (born 1999), English boxer
- Mark Chamberlain (cricketer) (born 1961), New Zealand cricketer
- Mark Chamberlain (educator) (1931–2014), American educator
- Mark Chamberlain (photographer) (1942–2018), American photographer
