= Mark Watts =

Mark Watts may refer to:

- Mark Watts (cricketer) (born 1963), English cricketer
- Rocket Watts (Mark Watts Jr., born 2000), American basketball player
- Mark F. Watts (born 1964), British member of the European Parliament, 1994–2004
- Mark Watts (journalist), freelance journalist who previously hosted the show Between the Headlines on Press TV

== See also ==
- Mark Watt (born 1996), Scottish cricketer
