= Mark Armstrong =

Mark Armstrong may refer to:

- Mark Armstrong (astronomer) (born 1958), British amateur astronomer
- Mark Armstrong (basketball) (born 2004), American basketball player
- Mark Armstrong (economist) (born 1964), British economist and academic
- Mark Armstrong (equestrian) (born 1961), British international representative show-jumper
- Mark Armstrong (footballer), New Zealand international association football player
- Mark Armstrong (musician) (born 1972), British jazz musician and composer
- Mark Armstrong, television executive, chair of the Australian Broadcasting Corporation Board in the 1990s
- Mark Armstrong, writer, co-creator of Spider-Ham
