= Mark Lindsay (disambiguation) =

Mark Lindsay (born 1942) is an American musician.

Mark Lindsay may also refer to:

- Mark Lindsay (footballer) (born 1955), retired English footballer
- Mark F. Lindsay (born 1963), Bill Clinton's Assistant to the President for the Office of Management and Administration
