= Mark Matthews (disambiguation) =

Mark Matthews was the oldest surviving Buffalo Soldier in the United States Army when he died at age 111 in 2005.

Mark Matthews may also refer to:

- Mark A. Matthews (1867–1940), Presbyterian minister and Prohibitionist
- Marvin Kratter or Mark Matthews (1915–1999), New York real estate investor and musician
- Mark Matthews (lacrosse) (born 1990), Canadian and American lacrosse player

== See also ==
- Mark Mathews (born 1983), Australian professional surfer
- Marc Matthews (born 1940s), writer from Guyana
- Mark A. Mathews (1926–2018), American academic
