= Mark Hatton =

Mark Hatton may refer to:

- Mark Hatton (luger) (born 1973), British luger
- Mark Hatton (cricketer) (born 1974), Australian cricketer
