= Mark Lemmon (disambiguation) =

Mark Lemmon (1889–1975) was an American architect.

Mark Lemmon may also refer to:

- Mark A. Lemmon, a professor of Pharmacology at Yale University

== See also ==
- Mark Lemon (1809–1870), British editor
- Mark Lemon (speedway rider)
