= Mark Elliot =

Mark or Marc El(l)iot(t) may refer to:

- Marc Eliot (Doctors), a character in the British soap opera Doctors
- Marc Elliot (born 1986), American author
- Marc Elliott (born 1979), British actor
- Mark Elliot (radio host) (1953–2019), Canadian broadcaster
- Mark Elliott (voice-over artist) (1939–2021), American voice-over artist for the Walt Disney Company
- Mark Elliott (boxer) (born 1966), British boxer
- Mark Elliott (British author) (born 1963), British travel author
- Mark C. Elliott, American professor of Chinese and Asian history at Harvard University
- Mark Elliott (Love Is a Many Splendored Thing), a character in the American soap opera Love is a Many Splendored Thing
- Mark Elliott (musician) (born 1967), American country singer and songwriter
- Mark Elliott (footballer) (born 1959), Welsh footballer
- Mark W. Elliott (active from 2007), scholar of religion at the University of St Andrews
- Paul Mark Elliott, British actor
- Marc Eliot, British historian and author of Walt Disney: Hollywood's Dark Prince
