= Mark Hyman =

Mark Hyman may refer to:

- Mark Hyman (commentator), American political commentator
- Mark Hyman (doctor) (born 1959), American physician and writer

== See also ==
- Marc Hyman, American screenwriter
