= Mark Napier =

Mark Napier may refer to:

- Mark Napier (artist) (born 1961), American internet artist
- Mark Napier (historian) (1798–1879), Scottish historian
- Mark Napier (ice hockey) (born 1957), former Canadian ice-hockey player
- Mark Napier (MP), British Member of Parliament for Roxburghshire, 1892–1895
