= Mark Lawson (disambiguation) =

Mark Lawson may refer to:

- Mark Lawson (born 1962), English journalist, broadcaster and author
- Mark Lawson (actor) (born 1979), American actor
- Mark Lawson (cricketer) (born 1985), English cricketer
- Mark Lawson (footballer) (born 1962), Australian rules footballer
- Mark Lawson (rugby union) (born 1980), Canadian rugby union player
- Mark Lawson (politician), member of the Oklahoma House of Representatives
