= Mark Slater =

Mark Slater may refer to:

- Mark Slater (fund manager) (born 1969), British fund manager and co-founder of Slater Investments
- Mark Slater (American football) (born 1955), American football player for Philadelphia and San Diego
- Mark Slater (Australian footballer) (born 1951), Australian rules footballer for Collingwood
- Mark Slater (composer) (born 1969), British film composer
