= Mark Olson =

Mark Olson may refer to:

- Mark Olson (musician) (born 1961), American country singer-songwriter
- Mark Douglas Olson (born 1955), American politician
- Mark W. Olson (1943–2018), U.S. Federal Reserve governor
- Mark Olson (curler), Canadian curler (Manitoba team)
- Mark Olson (British Columbia curler), Canadian curler (British Columbia team); see 2016 Canadian Direct Insurance BC Men's Curling Championship

== See also ==
- Marc Olsen, Danish footballer
