= Mark Parry =

Mark Parry may refer to:

- Mark Parry (musician), Canadian guitarist
- Mark Parry (footballer) (born 1970), former Welsh footballer
