= Mark Noble (disambiguation) =

Mark Noble is an English footballer.

Mark Noble may also refer to:

- Mark Noble (sportsman) (born 1962), New Zealand chess and lawn bowls player
- Mark Noble (biographer) (1754–1827), English clergyman, biographer and antiquary
- Mark Noble (cyclist) (born 1963), British Olympic cyclist
- Marc Noble of the Noble baronets, High Sheriff of Kent
- Noble Johnson (1881–1978), professional name of actor/producer whose birth name was Mark Noble
