= Mark Katz =

Mark Katz may refer to:

- Mark Katz (speechwriter) (born 1963), American speechwriter and author
- Mark N. Katz (born 1954), American academic
- Mark Katz (musicologist)
- Mark Steven Katz (born 1968), American voice actor
