= Mark Randall =

Mark Randall may refer to:

- Mark Randall (basketball) (born 1967), American basketball player
- Mark Randall (footballer) (born 1989), English football player
- Mark Randall (runner), winner of the 1976 4 × 880 yard relay at the NCAA Division I Indoor Track and Field Championships

== See also ==
- Mark Rendall (born 1988), Canadian actor
