= Mark Joseph =

Mark, Marc or Marcus Joseph may refer to:

- Mark Joseph (singer) (born 1982), English musician
- Mark Joseph (author) (born 1946), American novelist
- Mark Joseph (filmmaker) (born 1958), Soviet actor and director, Canadian TV film maker
- Mark Joseph (sports administrator) (born 1962/1963), Filipino swimmer and sports executive
- Mark Joseph (producer) (born 1968), American multimedia producer and author
- Mark Joseph (footballer) (born 1965), Welsh footballer
- Marc Joseph (born 1976), English and Antiguan footballer
- Marc Bamuthi Joseph (born 1975), American poet
- Marcus Joseph (born 1991), of the Trinidad and Tobago national football team
