= Mark Tucker =

Mark Tucker may refer to:

- Mark Tucker (offensive lineman) (born 1968), American football lineman
- Mark Tucker (American football coach), head coach of the Charleston Southern Buccaneers
- Mark Tucker (businessman) (born 1957), English businessman
- Mark Tucker (footballer) (born 1972), English football right back
- Mark Tucker (musician) (born 1957), a.k.a. T. Storm Hunter, musician and co-founder of Tetrapod Spools
- Mark Tucker (rugby union) (born 1980), English rugby union player
- Mark Tucker (tenor), tenor in a recording of the opera Ruth

== See also ==
- Marc Tucker (born 1940), president and CEO of the National Center on Education and the Economy
