= Mark Barry =

Mark Barry may refer to:

- Mark Barry (musician) (born 1978), member of English pop group BBMak
- Mark Barry (cyclist) (born 1964), British cyclist
- Mark Barry (drummer), member of American folk rock group Lord Huron
