= Mark Wallace (disambiguation) =

Mark Wallace (born 1967) is an American businessman, former diplomat and lawyer.

Mark Wallace may also refer to:

- Mark Wallace (community leader) (1893–1984), New Zealand cheesemaker, farmer, community leader and local politician
- Mark Wallace (cricketer) (born 1981), Welsh cricketer
- Mark Wallace (cyclist) (born 1995), Canadian mountain biker
- Mark Wallace (journalist) (born 1984), British political journalist
- Mark Wallace (businessman) (born 1953), CEO, Texas Children's Hospital
- Mark I. Wallace, American professor of religion
- Mark T. Wallace, professor of neuroscience and psychology at Vanderbilt University
- Marc Wallice, former American pornographic actor
