= Mark Stein =

Mark or Marc Stein may refer to:

- Sir Aurel Stein (Marc Aurel Stein, 1862–1943), Hungarian-British archaeologist
- Mark Stein (musician) (born 1947), American musician
- Mark Stein (author) (born 1951), American screenwriter, playwright, and non-fiction writer
- Marc Stein (historian) (born 1963), American historian
- Mark Stein (footballer) (born 1966), South African-born English footballer
- Mark Stein (American football), American football coach
- Marc Stein (footballer) (born 1985), German footballer
- Marc Stein (reporter), American sports reporter

== See also ==
- George Bagby (author) (Aaron Marc Stein, 1906–1985), American novelist
- Mark Steyn (born 1959), Canadian author and political commentator
