= Mark Waller =

Mark Waller may refer to:

- Sir Mark Waller (judge) (born 1940), Vice-President of the Civil Division of the Court of Appeal of England and Wales
- Mark Waller (doctor) (born 1957), club doctor of Leicester City Football Club
- Mark Waller (politician) (born 1969), member of the Colorado House of Representatives
