= Mark Casey =

Mark Casey may refer to:

- Mark Casey (footballer) (born 1982), Scottish footballer
- Mark Casey (bowls) (born 1982), Australian lawn bowler
