= Mark Holden (disambiguation) =

Mark Holden (born 1954) is an Australian singer.

Mark Holden may also refer to:

- Mark Holden (ice hockey) (born 1957), American ice hockey goaltender
- Mark Holden (actor) (born 1962), Canadian actor
- Mark Holden (darts player) (born 1960), English darts player
- Mark Holden (album), an album by the singer
