= Mark Richardson =

Mark Richardson may refer to:

- Mark Richardson (sprinter) (born 1972), British Olympic sprinter
- Mark Richardson (cricketer) (born 1971), New Zealand ex-cricketer, turned sports commentator and journalist
- Mark Richardson (footballer) (born 1972), Australian rules footballer
- Mark Richardson (ice hockey) (born 1986), English ice hockey player
- Mark Richardson (musician) (born 1970), drummer for the band Skunk Anansie and formerly Feeder
- Mark Richardson (politician) (born 1952), minority leader in the Missouri House of Representatives
- Mark Richardson (American football), American businessman and co-owner of the Carolina Panthers

== See also ==
- Mark Richards (disambiguation)
- Mark Bryson-Richardson, British diplomat
