= Mark Todd =

Mark Todd may refer to:

- Mark Todd (politician) (born 1954), British Labour Party Member of Parliament 1997-2010
- Mark Todd (equestrian) (born 1956), New Zealand Equestrian horse rider and Thoroughbred trainer
- Mark Todd (footballer) (born 1967), Northern Irish football player
- Mark Todd (police officer), civilian police officer who shot and disabled Nidal Malik Hasan during the Fort Hood shooting
- Blazing Skull a.k.a. Mark Todd, comic book character
