= Mark Lutz =

Mark Lutz is the name of:

- Mark Lutz (sprinter) (born 1951), US American sprinter
- Mark Lutz (actor) (born 1970), Canadian-born actor
- Mark A. Lutz (born 1941), Swiss-born economics professor
- Mark Lutz (1901–1968), model and longtime friend of Carl Van Vechten
