= Mark Estrin =

Mark Estrin might refer to:

- Marc Estrin (b. 1939), American writer, activist, and cellist
- Mark Estrin (1947–2005), American screenwriter and vintner, brother and screenwriting partner of Allen Estrin
