= Mark Willis =

Mark Willis may refer to:

- Mark Willis (motorcyclist) (born 1976), Australian Grand Prix motorcycle road racer
- Mark W. Willis, chief executive officer (CEO) of Keller Williams Realty, Inc.
- Mark N. Willis (born 1963), member of the South Carolina House of Representatives
