= Mark Lloyd =

Mark Lloyd may refer to

- Mark Lloyd (lawyer), American journalist and lawyer
- Mark Lloyd (boxer) (born 1975), English boxer
- Mark Lloyd (car designer), British industrial designer
