= Mark Peters =

Mark Peters may refer to:

- Mark Peters (footballer, born 1972), Welsh football player for Mansfield Town, Rushden & Diamonds, Leyton Orient and Cambridge United
- Mark Peters (footballer, born 1983), English football player for Brentford
- Mark Peters (American soccer), goalkeeper who played in Costa Rica and the United States
- Mark Peters (musician) (born 1975), English musician, songwriter and producer
- Mark Peters (sport administrator), Australian baseball player and sports executive
