= Mark Ridley =

Mark Ridley may refer to:

- Mark Ridley (physician) (1560–1624), English physician and mathematician
- Mark Ridley (zoologist) (born 1956), English zoologist

== See also ==
- Mark Ridley-Thomas (born 1954), Californian politician
