= Mark Humphrey =

Mark Humphrey may refer to:

- Mark Humphrey (actor) (born 1960), Canadian actor
- Mark Humphrey (artist) (born 1970), British interdisciplinary artist
