= Mark Moran =

Mark Moran may refer to:

- Mark Moran (criminal) (1964–2000), criminal of the infamous Moran family from Melbourne, Australia,
- Mark Moran (rugby league), Wales rugby league footballer
- Mark Moran (soccer) (born 1954), retired American soccer midfielder
- Mark Moran (writer), co-creator of the Weird N.J. magazine and website
- Mark Moran (boxer) (born 1982), English boxer
