= Mark Murray =

Mark Murray is the name of:

- Mark Murray (American football) (born 1967), American football player
- Mark Murray (rugby league) (born 1959), Australian rugby league footballer and coach
- Mark Murray (administrator) (born 1954), American government, academic and business administrator
- Mark Murray, victim of abuse by Comboni Missionaries of the Heart of Jesus
