= Mark Mullins =

Mark Mullins may refer to:

- Mark Mullins (economist) (born 1961), former executive director of the Fraser Institute
- Mark Mullins (hurler), retired Irish hurler
- Mark Mullins (politician), Progressive Conservative Party of Ontario candidate
- Mark Mullins (musician), New Orleans trombone player of Bonerama and Galactic

== See also ==
- Mark Mullen (born 1961), American journalist
- Markwayne Mullin (born 1977), American politician from Oklahoma
