= Mark Hubbard =

Mark Hubbard may refer to:

- Mark Hubbard (musician), American gospel musician
- Mark "Monk" Hubbard (1970–2018), American skateboarder
- Mark Hubbard (golfer) (born 1989), American golfer
