= Mark Horton =

Mark Horton may refer to:

- Mark Horton (archaeologist) (born 1956), British maritime and historical archaeologist, television presenter and writer
- Mark Horton (bridge) (born 1950), British author, journalist and expert on bridge
- Mary Ann Horton (born Mark R. Horton; 1955), American computer scientist

== See also ==
- Mack Horton OAM (born 1996), an Australian freestyle swimmer
