= Mark Tyler =

Mark Tyler may refer to:

- Mark Tyler (footballer) (born 1977), English football player
- Mark Tyler, New Zealand musician and part of Salmonella Dub
- Mark Tyler, mayor of Kirtland, Ohio

== See also ==
- Marc Tyler (born 1988), American football player
