= Mark Bunn =

Mark Bunn may refer to:

- Mark Bunn (Australian footballer) (born 1970), Australian rules footballer
- Mark Bunn (English footballer) (born 1984), English goalkeeper
