= Mark Burstein =

Mark Burstein may refer to:

- Mark Burstein (academic administrator), 16th president of Lawrence University
- Mark Burstein (editor) (born 1950), editor and expert on the works of Lewis Carroll
