= Mark McNally =

Mark McNally may refer to:

- Mark McNally (cyclist) (born 1989), cyclist from Great Britain
- Mark McNally (footballer) (born 1971), Scottish former footballer
- Mark McNally (racing driver) (born 1981), Australian racing driver
