= Mark Beaumont =

Mark Beaumont may refer to:

- Mark Beaumont (cyclist) (born 1983), English cyclist born in Swindon, adventurer, broadcaster, documentary maker and author
- Mark Beaumont (journalist) (born 1972), English music journalist
