= Mark Cullen =

Mark Cullen may refer to:

- Mark Cullen (writer), American TV and film writer
- Mark Cullen (Australian footballer) (born 1968), Australian footballer for Footscray
- Mark Cullen (ice hockey) (born 1978), American ice hockey
- Mark Cullen (English footballer) (born 1992), English footballer
- Mark Cullen (physician), physician, scholar, and population health scientist
