= Mark Draper (disambiguation) =

Mark Draper (born 1970), is an English footballer.

Mark Draper may also refer to:

- Mark Draper (tennis) (born 1971), Australian tennis player
- Mark Draper (runner) (born 1984), British runner and medallist at the 2011 European Cross Country Championships
- Mark Draper, character in Silk (TV series)
