= Mark Steele =

Mark Steele may refer to:

- Mark Steele (politician), South African member of Parliament
- Mark Steele (cricketer) (born 1976), former English cricketer
- Mark Steele (conspiracy theorist), British conspiracy theorist

== See also ==
- Mark Steel (born 1960), British comedian and left-wing commentator
- Marc Steele (born 1980), American Anglican bishop
