= Mark Scott =

Mark Scott may refer to:

== Entertainment ==
- Mark Scott (actor) (1915–1960), American actor and host of the television series Home Run Derby
- Mark Scott (radio host) (1936–2005), American talk show host
- Mark Scott, lead singer of the Miracles
- Mark Scott, also known as SHY, part of the Scottish rapper and songwriter duo SHY & DRS

== Sports ==
- Mark Scott (cricketer) (born 1959), English cricketer
- Mark Scott (footballer) (born 1959), Australian rules footballer
- Mark Scott (rower) (1923–2013), British rower

== Others ==
- Mark Scott (businessman) (born 1962), vice-chancellor of the University of Sydney and former managing director of the Australian Broadcasting Corporation
- Mark Scott (police officer), Australian Federal police officer killed in the Garuda plane crash
- Mark Scott, victim of serial killers Dean Corll and Elmer Wayne Henley

== See also ==
- Marc Scott (born 1993), British long-distance runner
