= Mark Webster =

Mark Webster may refer to:

- Mark Webster (journalist) (born 1953), British journalist and broadcaster
- Mark Webster (presenter), British sports presenter
- Mark Webster (darts player) (born 1983), Welsh darts player
- Mark Webster (figure skater) (born 1990), Australian figure skater
