= Mark Slade (disambiguation) =

Mark Slade (born 1939) is an actor.

Mark Slade may also refer to:

- Mark Slade (engineer) (born 1966/1967), British Formula One engineer
- Mark Slade (fencer) (born 1958), British fencer
