= Mark Waters (disambiguation) =

Mark Waters (born 1964) is an American film director.

== See also ==
- Mark Walters (disambiguation)
- Mark Watters (born 1955), music composer
