= Mark Lambert =

Mark Lambert may refer to:

- Mark Lambert (American actor) (born 1952), American musical theatre actor and singer
- Mark Lambert (Irish actor), Irish stage, film and television actor
- Mark Lambert (rugby union) (born 1985), English rugby union player
- Mark T. Lambert, American businessman and politician from New York
- Mark Lambert (engraver) (1781–1855), Tyneside engraver and lithographer (see Thomas Harrison Hair)
