= Mark Radford =

Mark Radford may refer to:

- Mark Radford (basketball) (born 1959), American former National Basketball Association player
- Mark Radford (footballer) (born 1968), English former footballer
