= Mark Atkins =

Mark Atkins may refer to:

- Mark Atkins (musician) (born 1957), Australian Aboriginal musician
- Mark Atkins (footballer) (born 1968), English former footballer
- Mark Atkins (director), film director and editor of 100 Million BC
- Mark Atkins (rugby union), rugby union player for Hawke's Bay Rugby Union
