= Mark Pryor (disambiguation) =

Mark Pryor (born 1963) is a former United States Senator who represented the U.S. State of Arkansas from 2003 to 2015.

Mark Pryor may also refer to:

- Mark Pryor (author) (born 1967), British mystery writer and Assistant District Attorney for Travis County, Texas
- M.G.M. Pryor (1915–1970), British entomologist

== See also ==
- Mark Prior (born 1980), professional baseball player
- Pryor (disambiguation)
