= Mark Wilkinson (disambiguation) =

Mark Wilkinson (born 1952) is an English cover art designer and illustrator.

Mark or Marc Wilkinson may also refer to:

- Mark Wilkinson (designer) (1950–2017), English furniture designer
- Mark Wilkinson (singer), English-born Australian singer-songwriter
- Mark Wilkinson (rugby union) (born 1977), English former rugby union player
- Marc Wilkinson (1929-2022), Australian composer and conductor
- Wilkinson (musician) (born 1989), Mark Wilkinson, British Dj and producer better known by the stage name Wilkinson
