= Mark Hall =

Mark Hall may refer to:

== People ==
- Mark Hall (musician) (born 1969), Casting Crowns member
- Mark Hall (animator) (1936–2011), producer of animated features
- Mark Hall (defensive end) (born 1965), American football player
- Mark Hall (American football coach) (born c. 1980), American college football coach
- Mark Hall (wrestler) (born 1997), American wrestler
- Mark David Hall (born 1966), American scholar
- Mark Hall (fighter) (born 1974), American mixed martial artist
- Mark Hall (politician) (elected 2018), American politician from Tennessee

== Other uses ==
- Mark Hall Academy a school in Harlow, Essex, England
- Mark Hall (Greenville, Georgia), listed on the NRHP in Meriwether County, Georgia

== See also ==
- Marc Hall, Canadian gay equality activist
- Marc Hall (baseball), Major League Baseball pitcher
- Marks Hall, a Jacobean country house near Coggeshall, Essex, England, demolished in 1950
- Marks (manor house), near Romford, Essex, England, demolished in 1808
