= Mark Nielsen =

Mark Nielsen may refer to:

- Mark Nielsen (attorney) (born 1961), former Connecticut state senator
- Mark Nielsen (tennis) (born 1977), former New Zealand tennis player
- Mark Nielsen (businessman) (born 1968), Australian businessman
