= Mark Zupan =

Mark Zupan may refer to:

- Mark Zupan (academic), dean of the University of Rochester's Simon School of Business
- Mark Zupan (athlete) (born 1975), captain of the United States wheelchair rugby team
