= Mark Warner (disambiguation) =

Mark Warner (born 1954) is a United States senator from Virginia

Mark Warner or Marc Warner may also refer to:

- Mark Warner (Canadian politician) (born 1964), Canadian politician and lawyer
- Mark Warner (film editor) (born 1954), film editor
- Mark Warner (physicist), (1952–2021), pioneering British physicist studying elastomers for creating artificial muscles
- Mark Warner (guitarist), Nashville Tennessee session guitarist, songwriter and music producer
- Mark Warner (House), fictional recurring character from the American television series House
- Mark Warner, Australian guitarist, member of After the Fall
- Mark Warner Ltd, British holiday company
- Marc Warner, CEO and co-founder of tech company Faculty
