= Mark Robson =

Mark Robson may refer to:

- Mark Robson (film director) (1913–1978), Canadian-American film director and producer
- Mark Robson (American writer), Scottish-American writer and expert in United States coins and stamps
- Mark Robson (footballer) (born 1969), English football player and coach
