= Mark Hallett =

Mark Hallett may refer to:

- Mark Hallett (art historian) (born 1965), British art historian
- Mark Hallett (artist) (born 1947), American illustrator specializing in paleoart
- Mark Hallett (neurologist) (1943–2025), American scientist
