= Mark Ricketts =

Mark Ricketts may refer to:

- Mark Ricketts (footballer) (born 1984), English footballer
- Mark Scott Ricketts (born 1955), American illustrator and cartoonist
