= Mark Fowler (disambiguation) =

Mark Fowler is a character from EastEnders, introduced in 1985

Mark Fowler may also refer to:

- Mark Fowler (2016 character), character from EastEnders introduced in 2016
- Mark S. Fowler (born 1941), former Chairman of the FCC
- Mark Walton Fowler, American physician and participant in executions
