= Mark Leslie =

Mark Leslie may refer to:

- Mark Leslie (author) (born 1969), Canadian author
- Mark Leslie (entrepreneur) (born 1945), American entrepreneur
