= Mark Turner =

Mark Turner is the name of:

- Mark Turner (musician) (born 1965), jazz saxophonist
- Mark Turner (cognitive scientist) (born 1954), cognitive scientist, linguist, and author
- Mark Turner (cricketer, born 1984), English cricketer
- Mark Turner (cricketer, born 1969), former English cricketer
- Mark Turner (Australian footballer) (born 1960), Australian rules footballer
- Mark Turner (footballer, born 1972), English footballer
- Mark Turner (judge) (born 1959), British judge of the High Court of England and Wales
- Mark Turner (politician) (born 1983), British-Australian politician and police officer
