= Mark Farrell =

Mark Farrell may refer to:

- Mark Farrell (comedian) (born 1968), Canadian comedian and writer
- Mark Farrell (tennis) (1953–2018), British tennis player
- Mark Farrell (politician) (born 1974), mayor of San Francisco
