= Mark Gray =

Mark Gray may refer to:

- Mark Gray (singer) (1952–2016), American country singer
- Mark Gray (skier) (born 1967), Australian Olympic skier
- Mark Gray (snooker player) (born 1973), English
- Mark Gray (photographer) (born 1981), Australian photographer
- Mark Gray (attempted assassin), traveling salesman who attempted to shoot actor Edwin Booth, 1879
- Mark Nicholas Gray, British Royal Marines officer

== See also ==
- Mark Grey, American classical music composer and sound engineer
