= Mark Norman =

Mark Norman may refer to:

- Mark Norman (marine biologist), Australian marine biologist
- Mark Norman (DJ) (born 1976), Dutch producer
- Mark Norman (Canadian naval officer), Canadian admiral
- Mark Norman (banker) (1910–1994), English banker
- Marc Norman (born 1941), American screenwriter

== See also ==
- Mark Normand, American comedian
