= Mark Jennings =

Mark Jennings may refer to:

- Mark Jennings (politician) (born 1961), member of the Wyoming House of Representatives
- Mark Jennings (rugby union) (born 1993), English rugby union player
- One of two television characters:
  - Mark Jennings (Dynasty 1981), from the 1980s prime time soap opera Dynasty
  - Mark Jennings (Dynasty 2017), from the 2017 reboot series Dynasty
