= Mark Mayer (disambiguation) =

Mark Mayer is a British biologist.

Marc Mayer or Mark Meyer may also refer to:

- Marc Mayer, Canadian arts manager and curator
- Marc Mayer (skier), Austrian cross-country skier
- Mark A. Meyer, founder and president of the Romanian-American Chamber of Commerce
- Mark Meyer (politician), Wisconsin politician
