= Marc Olsen =

Danish footballer (born 1986)

Personal information
- Full name: Marc Brockmann Olsen
- Date of birth: 15 January 1986 (age 40)
- Place of birth: Denmark
- Position: Midfielder

Youth career
- Vanløse IF

Senior career*
Years	Team	Apps	(Gls)
2006–2008	Brøndby IF	8	(1)
2008	SønderjyskE	6	(0)
2008–2011	Hvidovre IF	0	(0)
2011	Port Melbourne		
2011–2013	Hvidovre IF		
2013–2014	AB Tårnby		

International career
2001	Denmark U-16	3	(0)
2002–2003	Denmark U-17	17	(2)
2003–2004	Denmark U-18	5	(0)
- * Club domestic league appearances and goals as of 13 June 2008

Marc Brockmann Olsen (born 15 January 1986) is a Danish professional football (soccer) player and Backgammon Grandmaster.

== Football ==
Olsen plays as an attacking midfielder. He has played professionally for Danish clubs including Brøndby IF, and also one season for Port Melbourne Sharks in Australia.

Marc Olsen debuted for Brøndby's first team 5 November 2006 against FC København. His favourite position is as a right winger or offensive midfield.

== Backgammon ==
Olsen is a G2 Grandmaster in Backgammon in BMAB and UBC, and an author of books on Backgammon strategy. He also presents the YouTube channel "Backgammon Galaxy", teaching strategies from beginner to advanced level.

Olsen is also the Founder and current CEO of the mobile and web gaming site, Backgammon Galaxy. It is the platform of choice for online Backgammon Master and Grandmaster level players. It's both a web- and mobile based app.

== Bibliography ==
- Backgammon: From Basics to Badass (2015)
- Backgammon: Pure Strategy (2017)
- Backgammon - Cube like a boss: Patterns, Intuition & Strategy (2019)
- Backgammon Masterclass - co-written with Masayuki Mochizuki (2022)
- How to Not Suck at Backgammon (2023)
- The Golden Point (2025)
