= Mark Shepard =

American politician

Mark I. Shepard (born 1960) is a former Vermont State Senator (R-Bennington) and unsuccessful candidate for the 2006 Republican nomination for Vermont's at-large United States House of Representatives seat.

== Biography ==
Shepard was born on September 12, 1960, in Windsor, Vermont, and grew up in the neighboring town of Hartland. After graduating from Hartford High School in 1978, he went on to earn a journeyman electrician license (1982), a Bachelor of Science in electrical engineering, University of Florida (1986), and a Master of Engineering in electrical engineering from Rensselaer Polytechnic Institute (1994).

Shepard and his wife Rebecca lived in Bennington, Vermont, from 1994, until they moved to Virginia in 2011, and have four sons.

He is the owner and operator of an industrial control and test systems engineering business, which he founded in 1993.

== Public life ==
In 2002, Shepard was elected to the Vermont Senate. He was re-elected in 2004.

Shepard ran for the 2006 Republican nomination for Vermont's at-large United States House of Representatives seat. On September 12, 2006 he was defeated by Martha Rainville in the Republican primary.
