= Marcus (surname) =

Marcus is a patronymic or toponymic surname in Italy, southern France, and Spain around 1000 A.D., attributable to religious monasteries and sanctuaries named Sanctus Marcus (or its many variants). The surname was used as an identifier for the area of origin. The first historical record of the surname was in the year 1390 in Biberach an der Riß, Germany., that is developed from the masculine given name of Ancient Roman pre-Christian origin derived either from Etruscan Marce of unknown meaning or referring to the god Mars. Mars was identified as the Roman god of war.

== Notable people with the surname include ==
Marcus
- Pronunciation: MAR-kus

Origin
- Meaning: "son of Mark"

Other names
- Variant forms: Marchi, De Marchi, De Marco, Di Marco, Marco, Di Marko, Marko, Marcus, Marconi, Marchitello, Marcuzzi, Marchini, Merck, Marck, Van der Marck, Markushkin, Markowicz, Markowitz, Markovich, Marcovitch, Markovic, Markovics, Marcovici, Marczewski, Marques, Márquez etc.

- Adam W. Marcus (born 1979), American mathematician
- Claude-Gérard Marcus (1933–2020), French politician
- David A. Marcus (born 1973), French-born American entrepreneur, president of PayPal
- Émile Marcus (born 1930), French Roman Catholic archbishop
- Eric Marcus (born 1958), nonfiction author and journalist
- Ernst Gustav Gotthelf Marcus (1893–1968), malacologist
- Eveline Du Bois-Reymond Marcus (1901–1990), zoologist
- Frank I. Marcus (1928–2022), American physician
- Gary Marcus (born 1970), research psychologist and author
- George Marcus (disambiguation), several people
- George E. Marcus, American anthropologist
- George M. Marcus (born 1941), American billionaire real estate broker, founder of Marcus & Millichap
- Greil Marcus (born 1945), American author
- Jacob Rader Marcus (1896–1995), US reform rabbi
- James S. Marcus (1929–2015), American investment banker and philanthropist
- Joan Marcus, American theatrical photographer
- Jürgen Marcus (1948–2018), German singer
- Ken Marcus (born 1946), American photographer
- Lauren Marcus, American actress
- Lee Marcus (1893–1969), American filmmaker
- Louis W. Marcus (1863–1923), American lawyer and judge
- Marcia Marcus (1928–2025), American figurative painter
- Marvin Marcus (1927–2016), American mathematician
- Mickey Marcus (1901–1948), American jurist and colonel
- Morton Marcus (1936–2009), American poet and author
- Nancy Marcus (1950–2018), American biologist and college administrator
- Rudolph A. Marcus (1923–2026), chemist and Nobel Prize winner
- Siegfried Marcus (1831–1898), German-Austrian inventor
- Simon Marcus (born 1986), Canadian-Jamaican Muay Thai kickboxer
- Sol Marcus (1912–1976), American songwriter
- Solomon Marcus (1925–2016), Romanian mathematician
- Stanley Marcus (1905–2002), co-founder of Neiman Marcus
- William Marcus (1917–1989), Finnish-British film director

=== Markus ===
- Dov Markus (born 1946), Israeli-American soccer player
- Gabriela Markus, Brazilian model
- Hazel Rose Markus, American psychologist
- Kurt Markus, American photographer
- Louis Marcoussis, former name Ludwik Kazimierz Wladyslaw Markus, Polish-born French painter and engraver
- Louise Markus, Australian politician
- Rixi Markus, Austrian and later British bridge player

=== Márkus ===
- Erzsébet Márkus, Hungarian weightlifter
- György Márkus, Jewish Hungarian philosopher
- Robert Markuš, Serbian chess Grandmaster

== See also ==
- Marcus (name)
- Marcus (praenomen)
- Marques (disambiguation)
