= Marchetti =

Marchetti is an Italian surname. Notable people with the surname include:

- Alberto Marchetti (born 1954), Italian professional football player
- Alessandro Marchetti (aircraft engineer) (1884–1966), Italian aircraft engineer
- Alessandro Marchetti (mathematician) (1633–1714), Italian mathematician
- Alessandro Marchetti (footballer) (born 1988), Italian footballer
- Angelo Marchetti (1674-1753), Italian astronomer from Pistoia
- Assunta Marchetti (1871–1948), Italian beatified of the Catholic Church
- M. Cristina Marchetti (born 1955), Italian-American physicist
- Elio Marchetti (born 1974), Italian race car driver and motorcycle racer
- Enrico Marchetti (1855-1930), Italian violin maker
- Federico Marchetti (born 1983), Italian international football goalkeeper
- Federico Marchetti (businessman) (born 1969), Italian founder of YOOX
- Fermo Dante Marchetti (1876-1940), Italian composer and songwriter
- Filippo Marchetti (1831–1902), Italian opera composer
- Francisco Coria Marchetti (born 2000), Argentine rugby player
- Gianluca Marchetti (born 1993), Italian professional basketball player
- Gianni Marchetti (1933-2012), Italian composer songwriter
- Gianpietro Marchetti (born 1948), Italian professional footballer
- Gino Marchetti (1927–2019), American professional football player
- Giorgia Marchetti (born 1995), Italian tennis player
- Giovanni Battista Marchetti (1730-1800), Italian decorative fresco painter in a neoclassical-style
- Giovanni Matteo Marchetti (1647-1704), Bishop of Arezzo
- Giovanni Marchetti (ice hockey) (born 1968), Italian ice hockey player
- Giulio Marchetti (1911-1993), Italian stage, film and television actor and presenter
- John W. Marchetti (1908-2003), American radar pioneer
- Leandro Marchetti (born 1974), Argentine fencer
- Louis Marchetti (1920–1992), Italian illustrator and portrait painter
- Marco Marchetti (1528–1588), Italian painter of the late-Renaissance or Mannerist period
- Maria Cristina Marchetti born 1955), Italian-born American theoretical physicist
- Michele Marchetti (born 1994), Italian ice hockey player
- Nico Marchetti (born 1990), Austrian politician
- Nino Marchetti (1909-1983), Italian film actor
- Piero Marchetti, Italian bobsledder
- Pietro Marchetti (1589-1673), Italian physician, anatomist and surgeon
- Raffaele Marchetti (born 1975), Italian political scientist and editorialist
- Stefano Marchetti (ice hockey) (born 1986), Italian professional ice hockey defenceman
- Stefano Marchetti (footballer, born 1963), Italian former football striker.
- Stefano Marchetti (footballer, born 1998), Italian football player
- Victor Marchetti (1930-2018), American writer, executive assistant to the Deputy Director of the Central Intelligence Agency
- Víctor Marchetti (born 1950), Argentine retired footballer
- Vincent Marchetti (born 1997), French professional footballer

== See also ==
- 22155 Marchetti, main-belt asteroid
- Savoia-Marchetti, Italian aircraft manufacturer
- Louis Marchetti House, located in Wausau, Wisconsin, United States
- Marchetti Glacier, in the Saint Johns Range of Victoria Land, Antarctic
- Palazzo Marchetti, Pistoia, Baroque-style palace located in central Pistoia, Tuscany, Italy
