= De Marchi =

De Marchi or DeMarchi is a surname. Notable people with the surname include:

- Adevildo De Marchi (1894–1965), Italian forward footballer
- Alberto De Marchi (born 1986), Italian rugby union player
- Alessandro De Marchi (conductor), Italian conductor
- Alessandro De Marchi (cyclist) (born 1986), Italian cyclist
- Alfredo Demarchi (1857–1937), Argentine businessman and politician
- Andrea De Marchi (disambiguation) multiple people
- Carlo De Marchi (1890–1972), Italian footballer in the role of midfielder
- Denny DeMarchi, Canadian musician
- Emilio De Marchi (actor) (born 1959), Italian film and television actor
- Emilio De Marchi (tenor) (1861–1917), Italian opera singer
- Juan De Marchi (1866–1943), Italian anarchist
- Laura De Marchi (born 1936), Italian actress
- Marco De Marchi (born 1966), Italian footballer and agent
- Matt DeMarchi (born 1981), American-born Italian ice hockey player
- Mattia De Marchi (born 1991), Italian cyclist
- Michael De Marchi (born 1994), Italian footballer
- Neil De Marchi (born 1938), Australian economist
- Omar De Marchi (born 1966), Argentine politician
- Roberto De Marchi (1896–??), Italian wrestler
- Secondo De Marchi (1911–1996), Italian boxer
- Stefano De Marchi (born 1962), Italian mathematician
- Steve DeMarchi, Canadian musician
- Suze DeMarchi (born 1964), Australian singer-songwriter

== See also ==
- De Marchi (clothing), Italian clothing company
- Marchi, similar surname
