= Alessandro Marchetti =

Alessandro Marchetti may refer to:

- Alessandro Marchetti (mathematician) (1633–1714), Italian mathematician
- Alessandro Marchetti (aircraft engineer) (1884–1966), Italian engineer and airplane designer
- Alessandro Marchetti (footballer) (born 1988), Italian footballer
