= Markovitz =

Markovitz is a surname that may be of Jewish or Americanized Croatian, Slovak and Slovene origin, a variant of Markovich or Marković, which are patronymics from the personal name Mark. Notable people with the surname include:

- Leon Markovitz (1937–2005), South African politician and hotelier
- Steven Markovitz (born 1965), South African film and television producer

== See also ==
- Markowitz, a cognate
- Surnames derived from the name Mark, other variants
