= Markowitz =

Markowitz is a Germanized/Yiddish version of Slavic name Markovich. Notable people with the surname include:

- Deborah Markowitz (born 1961), Vermont secretary of state
- Gerald Markowitz (born 1944), American historian
- Harry Markowitz (1927–2023), financial economist and Nobel Laureate
- John Markowitz (born 1954), professor of psychiatry at Weill Cornell Medical College
- Kate Markowitz (born 1956), American singer-songwriter
- Marty Markowitz (born 1945), Brooklyn borough president
- Mitch Markowitz, Canadian television executive
- Nicholas Markowitz (1984–2000), American murder victim
- Phil Markowitz (born 1952), pianist
- Richard Markowitz (1926-1994), American film composer
- William Markowitz (1907–1998), American astronomer

== See also ==
- Markovitz, a cognate
- Surnames derived from the name Mark, other variants
- The Family Markowitz, 1996 novel
