= Common Kings =

American/Hawaiian/Samoan reggae rock/pop band

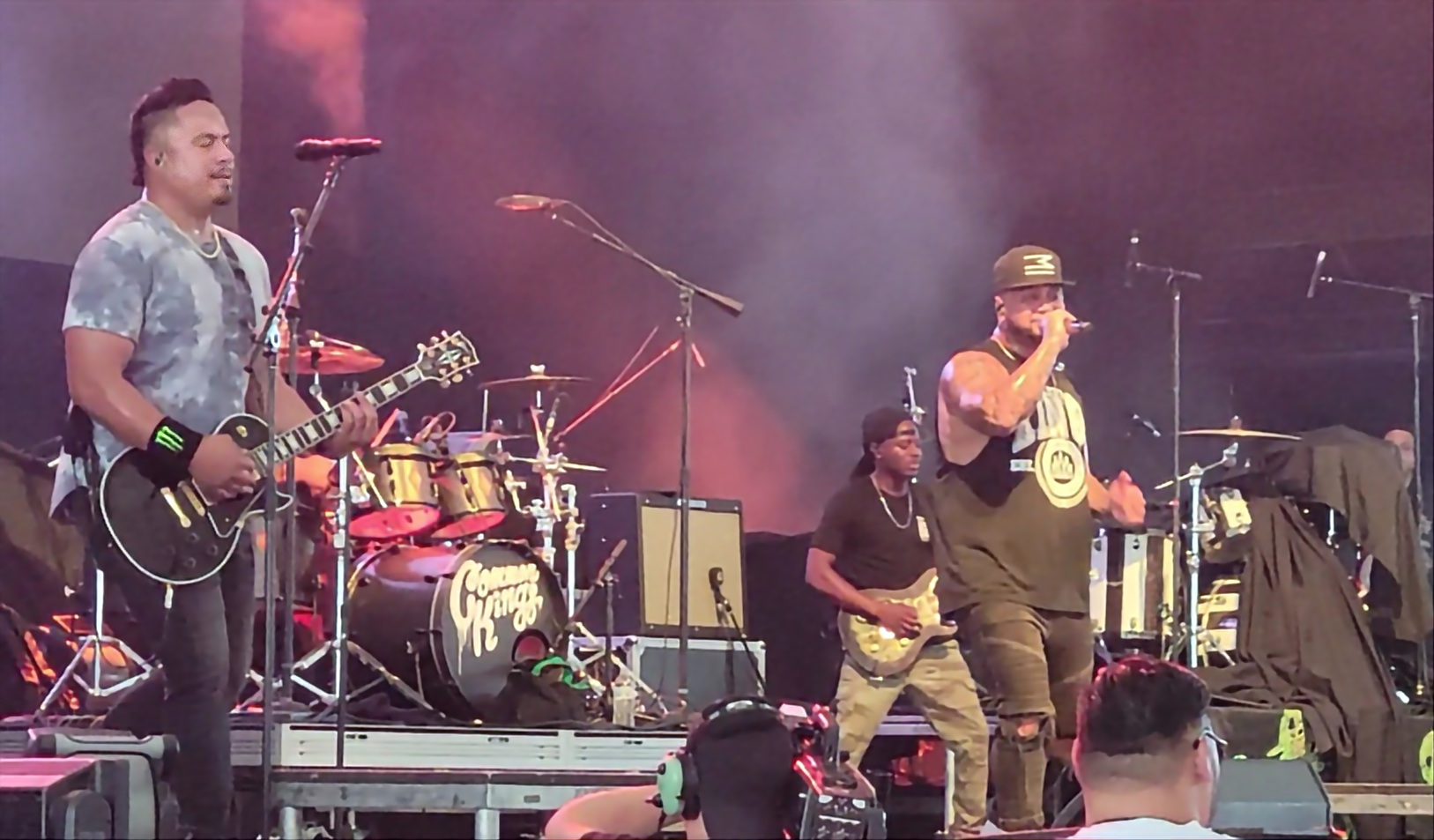
- Common Kings performing in Boston in 2022

Background information
- Origin: Orange County, California, U.S.
- Genres: Reggae; reggae rock; pop
- Years active: 2011–present
- Labels: Island Empire; Mensch House
- Members: Jr. King; Mata; Uncle Lui; Big Rome
- Website: commonkings.com

Common Kings is an American, Hawaiian, and Samoan reggae rock/pop band from Orange County, California. The band's debut album, Lost in Paradise, was nominated for a Grammy Award.

== History ==
=== Formation (2011) ===
Born in the South Pacific and raised in Orange County, California, the members of Common Kings, which consists of 'Jr. King' (Sasualei Maliga) on lead vocals, 'Mata' (Taumata Grey) on guitar, 'Uncle Lui' (Ivan Kirimaua) on bass, and 'Big Rome' (Jerome Taito) on drums, formed the band after forging a bond from a jam session at Ivan's house.

Originally from Hawaii with Samoan roots, Sasualei Maliga, who has a three-octave vocal range, met drummer Jerome Taito (from Tonga), bassist Ivan Kirimaua (from Fiji/Kirimaua) and guitarist Taumata Grey (from Samoa) when they were growing up in the Orange County towns of Costa Mesa, Garden Grove, and Irvine, all through a close-knit O.C. Pacific-Islander community. The four met in 2002 during a barbecue at Kirimaua's beachfront house in Newport Beach, California.

They formed the band while studying at Orange Coast College in Costa Mesa, California, and began recording songs in 2011.

The band name pays tribute to their proud heritage and the love for their home lands of Fiji, Hawaii, Samoa, and Tonga. All members have ruling-class bloodlines; they each trace their ancestry to royalty in their homelands. However, they remind us that they are just "everyday guys" from Orange County, California, living out their humble dreams. Common Kings developed a style of reggae with hints of rock and an island sound. Their songs feature an array of "head-rocking beats, feel-good vibes, and emotional fever."

=== EPs and Touring (2013–2014) ===
After releasing two EPs in 2013; #Weontour Soundtrack on July 20 and Summer Anthems on August 13 (both of which were top ten hits on the Billboard Reggae Albums chart), Singles, "Alcoholic" and "Wade in Your Water" from Summer Anthems were the first to hit Hawaiian radio.

Since their rise in popularity with the masses, Common Kings' songs have garnered the attention of pop music superstars. They have toured with Bruno Mars, CeeLo, Fifth Harmony, and Meghan Trainor, who was so impressed by the band that she helped write some songs off the Summer Anthems EP like "24/7", "Sickness" and "Your Turn".

Common Kings toured Australia and New Zealand as a support act on Justin Timberlake's The 20/20 Experience World Tour in 2014.

=== Hits & Mrs. (2015) ===
The band signed to Island Empire Records, who issued the EP Hits & Mrs. on October 9, 2015 peaked at #2 on the Billboard Top Reggae Albums chart. The band teamed up with Meghan Trainor again for their single, "Before You Go". She co-wrote the song and was featured singing on it.

=== Lost in Paradise (2017) ===
Their debut album Lost in Paradise, released on February 3, 2017, received a Grammy Award nomination in the Best Reggae Album category, and topped the Billboard Top Reggae Albums chart.

=== One Day EP (2018) ===
The band's fourth EP, One Day, which was released on August 10, 2018 on Mensch House Records reached #2 on the Billboard charts for Top Reggae Albums.

Common Kings was featured as one of many reggae bands on Collie Buddz riddim album, Cali Roots Riddim 2020 with their single, "There I Go", which was produced by Buddz and mixed by Stick Figure's touring guitarist, producer Johnny Cosmic.

In 2021, Common Kings was one of several reggae and punk bands on The House That Bradley Built, a charity compilation honoring Sublime's lead singer Bradley Nowell, helping musicians with substance abuse. They covered Sublime's song "Garden Grove", the first track on the album.

=== Celebration (2023) ===
Common Kings recorded their second studio album titled, Celebration. It was released by Mensch House Records on August 25, 2023. The first single is "Celebration (One Shot)", a feel-good, party anthem. They tapped into their community of musicians to bring their album full circle and "celebrate" their pop and reggae roots by featuring reggae artists J Boog, Demarco, Kabaka Pyramid, Marc E. Bassy, and more.

The follow-up is based on the past 10-plus years of their careers. It's a way to "toast" to more than a decade of their musical experience. The band worked once again with the pop-production duo The Audibles, who also co-wrote a handful of the songs. They also synced up with producer Poo Bear (Justin Bieber) on "City of Champions".

Uncle Lui describes the album's meaning, "It's a celebration of doing things our way" says Uncle Lui. We've made a lot of things happen in an unconventional, unorthodox way. It's a celebration of where we are today. We're able to live in so many different musical worlds." JR adds, "It's a culmination of our careers, jamming 20 years, raising families, living life and making music; all of it coming together and being able to share that with the world."

Common Kings was one of the many featured reggae rock artists on Crossed Heart Clothing presents Pop Punk Goes Reggae, Vol. 1, which was produced by frontman Nathan Aurora of Iya Terra. The 16-track album was released on September 15, 2023 by Ineffable Records. The band covered "I Write Sins Not Tragedies" by Panic! At The Disco.

== Musical influences ==
Common Kings' musical style incorporates elements of pop, reggae, R&B, and island music. The group's sound reflects a range of individual influences, including artists such as Bob Marley, Earth, Wind and Fire, Gypsy Kings, George Benson, Jim Croce, Led Zeppelin, Michael Jackson, Stevie Wonder, Van Morrison, and the Who to name a few.

== Other projects ==
Common Kings teamed up with SRH Productions to collaborate on a short sleeve button down shirt and package called the "Aloha-Bro", which was available in limited quantities (50 black shirts and 50 white shirts). In order to keep the "aloha spirit flowing", every order came with free items, which included Common Kings One Day and Lost in Paradise CDs, a Common Kings die cut decal, and 2 SRH stickers.

They are supporters of Donald Trump, and they played for his rally at Madison Square Garden on March 27, 2024.

== Band members ==
=== Current lineup ===
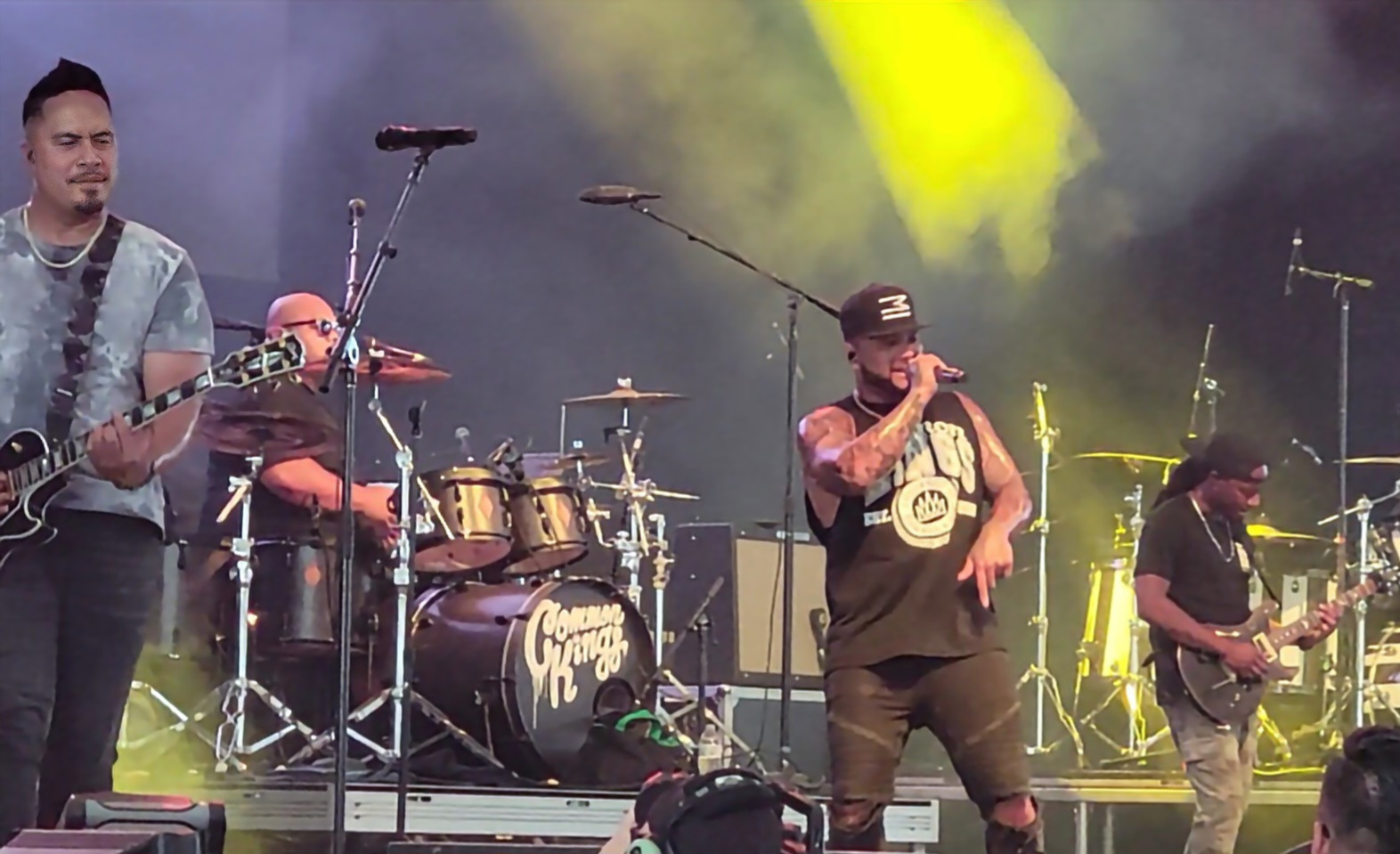
Common Kings performing at the Leader Bank Pavilion in Boston, MA on July 28, 2022.

- Jr. King (Sasualei Maliga) – vocals
- Mata (Taumata Grey) – guitar
- Uncle Lui (Ivan Kirimaua) – bass
- Big Rome (Jerome Taito) – drums

== Discography ==
=== Studio albums ===
Chart history
Year	Album	Label	Peak position (Billboard Top Reggae)
2017	Lost in Paradise	Island Empire Records	1
2023	Celebration	Mensch House Records	–

=== EPs ===
Chart history
Year	Album	Label	Peak position (Billboard Top Reggae)
2013	#Weontour Soundtrack	Self-produced	7
2013	Summer Anthems	Island Empire Records	4
2015	Hits & Mrs.	Island Empire Records	2
2018	One Day	Mensch House Records	2

=== Singles ===
Title	Release date	Album
"She's a Professional"	2013	#Weontour Soundtrack EP
"IDGAF"	2013	#Weontour Soundtrack EP
"Wade in your Water"	2013	Summer Anthems EP
"No Other Love" (feat. J Boog & Fiji)	2013	Summer Anthems EP
"Alcoholic"	2013	Summer Anthems EP
"24/7"	2013	Sumner Anthems EP
"Just Another Lover"	2013	Summer Anthems EP
"Sickness"	2013	Summer Anthems EP
"Your Turn"	2013	Summer Anthems EP
"Fly"	2013	Summer Anthems EP
"Fall in Love"	2013	Summer Anthems EP
"Kingdom Come"	2014	Non-album single
"On the Low"	2015	Hits & Mrs. EP
"Since I Woke Up"	2015	Hits & Mrs. EP
"Ain't No Stopping"	2015	Hits & Mrs. EP
"Before You Go" (feat. Meghan Trainor)	2015	Hits & Mrs. EP
"Take Her"	2017	Lost in Paradise
"Mary Wanna"	2017	Lost in Paradise
"License to Smoke"	2017	Lost in Paradise
"Always Beside You"	2017	Lost in Paradise
"Speaking My Language"	2017	Lost in Paradise
"I Want Your Body"	2017	Lost in Paradise
"Everybody Wants to Fool the World"	2017	Lost in Paradise
"Cali Girl" (feat. Don Corlean)	2017	Non-album single
"One Day"	2018	One Day EP
"Today's a New Day" (feat. ¡MAYDAY!)	2018	One Day EP
"Champion" (feat. Kat Dahlia)	2018	One Day EP
"Broken Crowns" (feat. Matisyahu)	2018	One Day EP
"Queen Majesty" (feat. Sammy Johnson & the Green)	2019	Non-album single
"Neil Armstrong" (feat. Landon McNamara)	2019	Non-album single
"Happy Pill"	2020	Non-album single
"Fish in the Sea" (feat. Marc E. Bassy)	2020	Non-album single
"Let Me Down Slow"	2020	Non-album single
"There I Go" (feat. Collie Buddz)	May 22, 2020	Cali Roots Riddim
"California Day" (feat. Shwayze)	August 28, 2020	Non-album single
"Garden Grove" (Sublime cover)	September 4, 2020	The House That Bradley Built
"Damn Good Time"	July 22, 2022	Non-album single
"Raggamuffin"	February 3, 2023	"Celebration" (single)
"Celebration (One Shot)"	June 23, 2023	"Celebration" (single)
"Hideaway"	July 14, 2023	"Celebration" (single)
"Came Up" (feat. Kabaka Pyramid & SpreadLof)	August 25, 2023	Celebration
"Raggamuffin" (feat. J Boog	August 25, 2023	Celebration
"Do My Thing" (feat. Royal Blu)	August 25, 2023	Celebration
"City of Champions"	August 25, 2023	Celebration
"Just One of Those Days" (feat. Demarco)	August 25, 2023	Celebration
"I Write Sins Not Tragedies" (Panic! at the Disco reggae cover)	September 15, 2023	Pop Punk Goes Reggae, Vol. 1
"Stand by Me (Drew Forever)"	December 15, 2023	Non-album single
