= Marchini =

Marchini is a family name of Italian origin. Notable people with the surname include:

- Giannina Marchini (1906–1979), Italian sprinter and middle distance runner
- Davide Marchini (born 1981), Italian football player
- Jonathan Marchini (born 1973), Bayesian statistician and professor of statistical genomics
- Libero Marchini (1914–2003), Italian football player
- Ron Marchini (born 1945), American karateka
- Simona Marchini (born 1941), Italian actress and presenter
- Tasso Marchini (1907–1936), Italian Modernist painter

== See also ==
- Marchi
- Marchetti
