= Marcovich =

Marcovich is a surname. Notable people with the surname include:

- Carlos Marcovich (born 1963), Mexican film director, editor, producer, and photographer
- Miroslav Marcovich (1919–2001), Serbian-American philologist and academic

== See also ==
- Markovich
