= Empoli =

- Comune
- Comune di Empoli
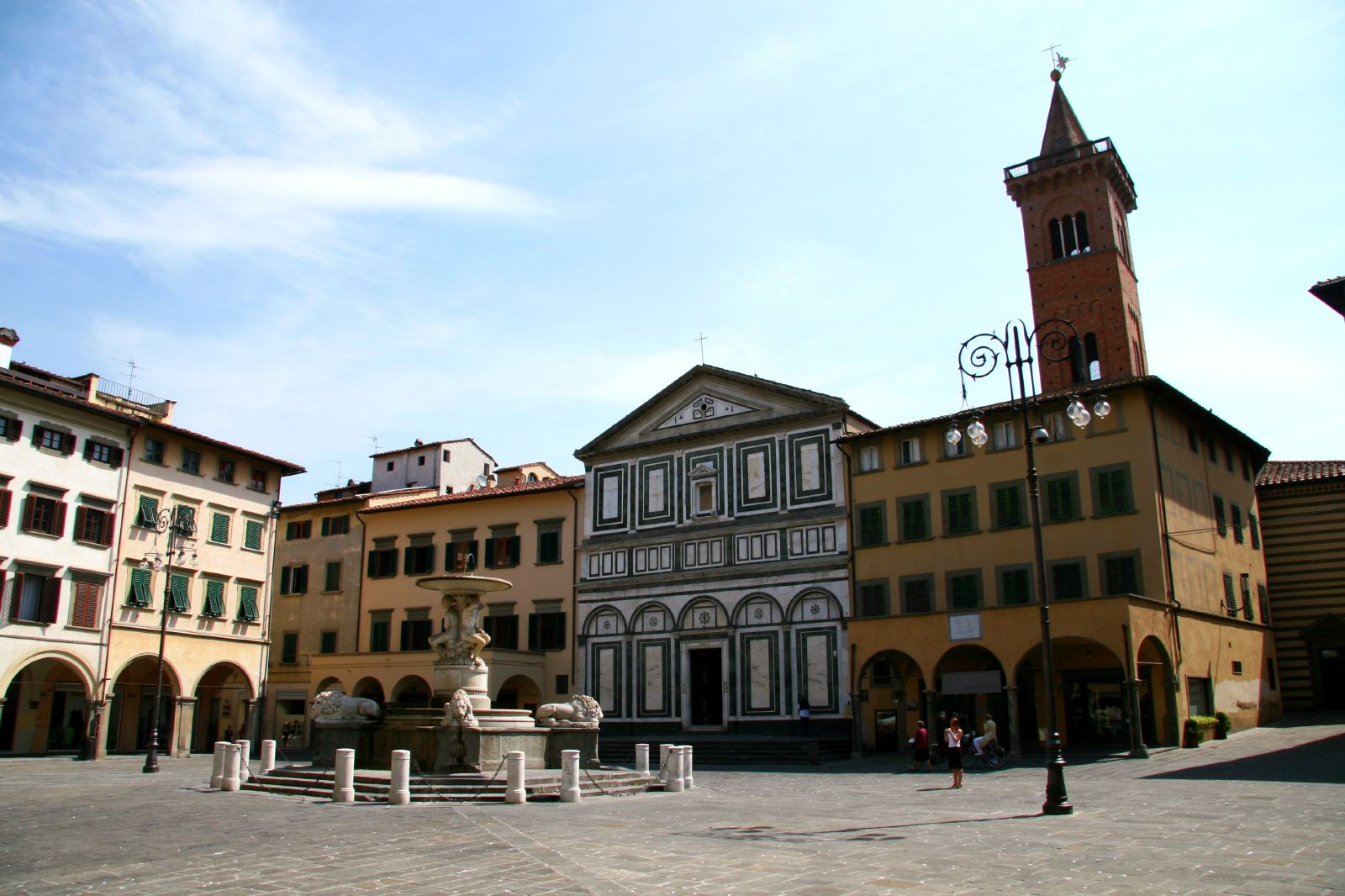
- Piazza Farinata degli Uberti

- Flag Coat of arms

- Location within Italy Location within Tuscany
- Coordinates: 43°43′N 10°57′E
- Country: Italy
- Region: Tuscany
- Metropolitan city: Florence (FI)
- Frazioni: Avane, Casenuove, Corniola, Cortenuova, Fontanella, Marcignana, Monterappoli, Pagnana, Ponte a Elsa, Pontorme, Pozzale, Sant'Andrea, Serravalle, Villanova

Government
  - Mayor: Alessio Mantellassi (since 26 May 2024)

Area
  - Total: 62.28 km^{2} (24.05 sq mi)
- Elevation: 28 m (92 ft)

Population (30 November 2014)
  - Total: 48,004
  - Density: 770.8/km^{2} (1,996/sq mi)
- Demonym: Empolesi
- Time zone: UTC+1 (CET)
  - Summer (DST): UTC+2 (CEST)
- Postal code: 50053
- Dialing code: 0571
- Patron saint: St. Andrew
- Saint day: November 30
- Website: Official website

Empoli (Italian pronunciation: [ˈempoli]) is a town and comune in the Metropolitan City of Florence, Tuscany, Italy, about 30 km (20 miles) southwest of Florence, to the south of the Arno in a plain formed by the river. The plain has been usable for agriculture since Roman times. The commune's territory becomes hilly as it departs from the river. Empoli is on the main railway line from Florence to Pisa, and is the point of divergence of a line to Siena. Empoli has an enduring tradition as an agricultural centre. It has given its name to a local variety of artichoke.

== History ==
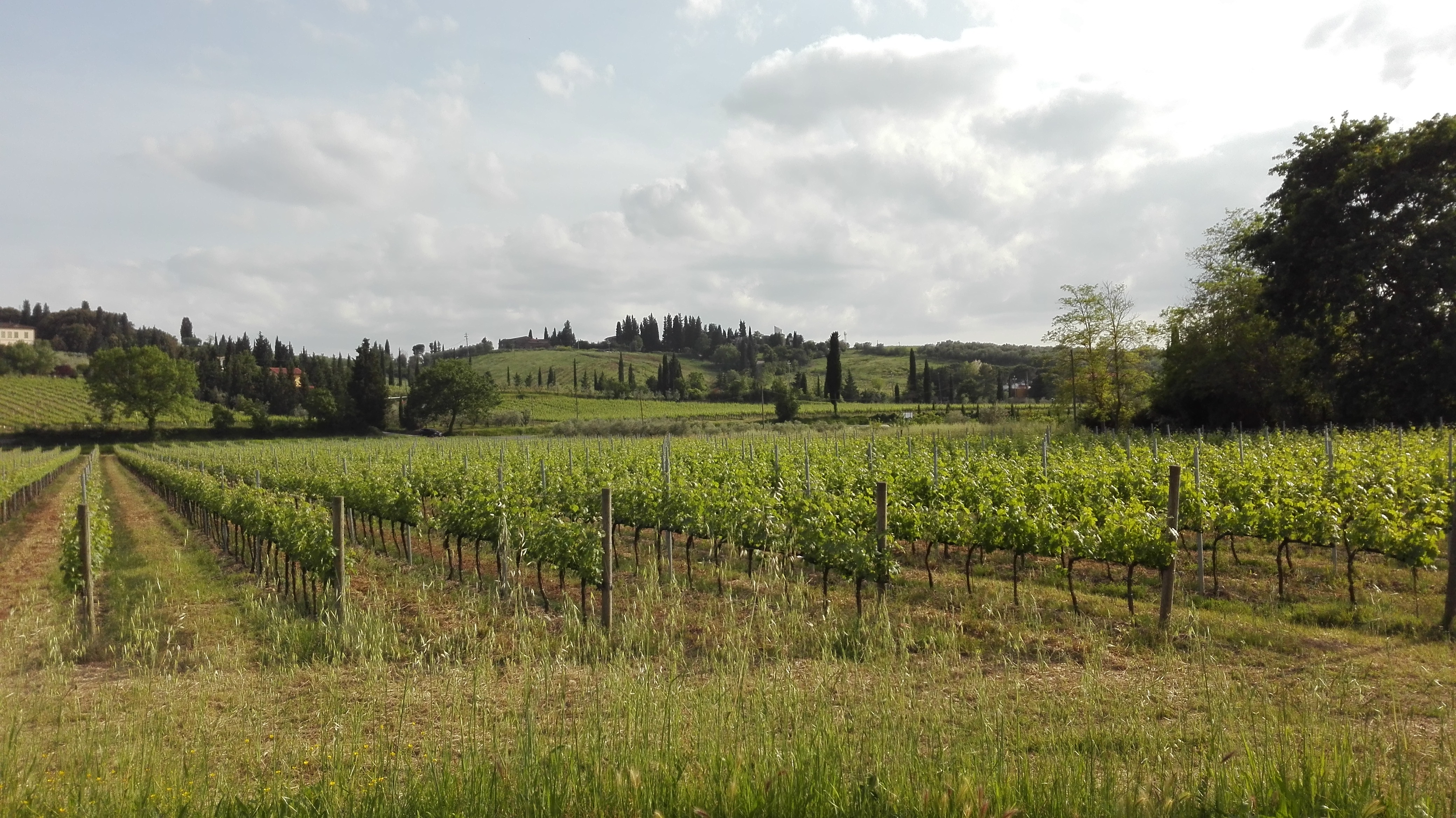
Empoli's countryside

Archaeological finds have revealed that Empoli was already settled in the early Roman Empire times, and continued to exist until the 4th century AD. The river acted as a communication way for the trade of agricultural products, together with the local amphorae. In the Tabula Peutingeriana of the 4th century Empoli is called in portu ("in the port") as a river port on the Roman road Via Quinctia, which led from Fiesole and Florence to Pisa. Empoli was also on the Via Salaiola, connecting to Volterra's salt ponds.

Since the 8th century Empoli consolidated as a town around the castle, known as Emporium or Empolis. In 1119 it was absorbed into the Guidi counts' possessions. In 1182 it fell under Florentine rule. In 1260, after the Battle of Montaperti, Empoli was the seat of a famous council in which Farinata degli Uberti opposed the destruction of Florence.

Later Empoli became an important fortress, and was therefore repeatedly sacked and attacked. In 1530 its fall marked the end of the independence of the Florentine Republic.

== Main sights ==
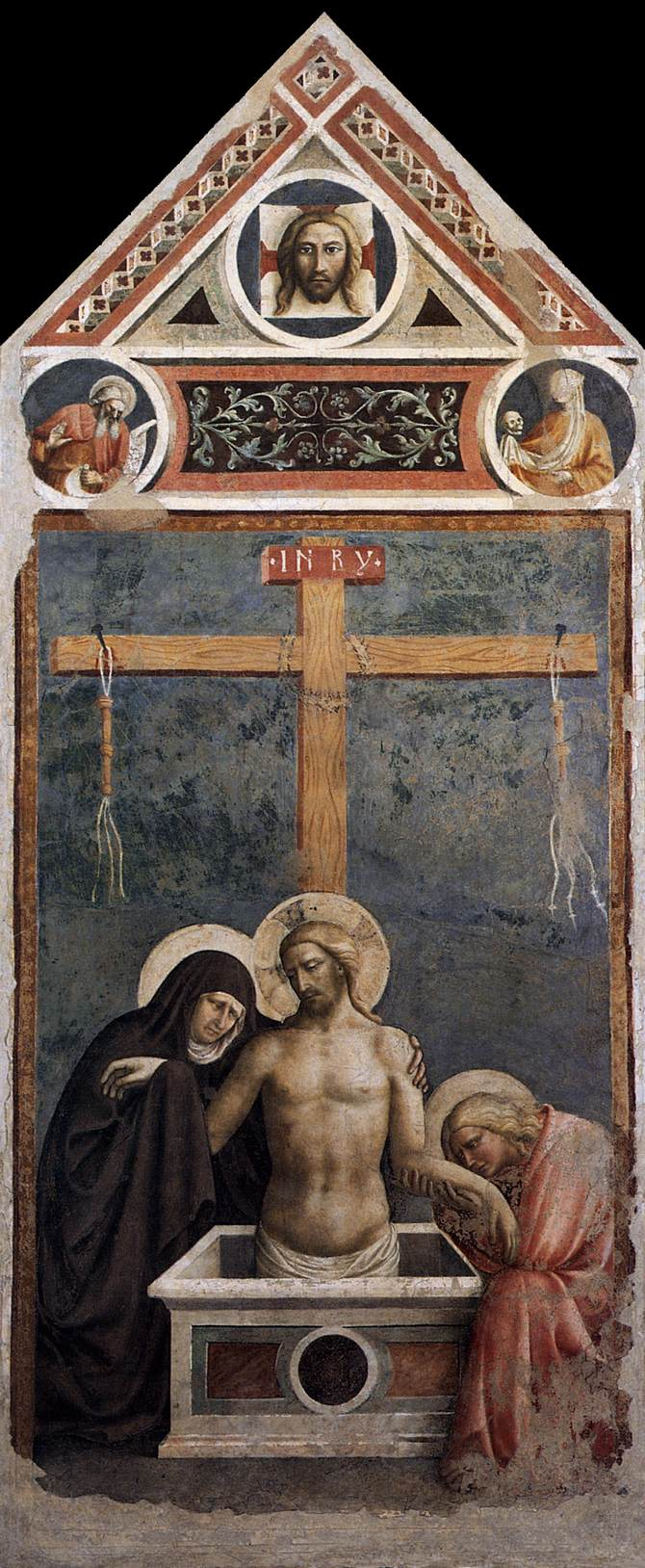
Pietà by Masolino da Panicale

- Piazza Farinata degli Uberti, also known as Piazza dei Leoni ("Lions Square"), is marked in its centre by a fountain by Luigi Pampaloni (1827). Here lies the Collegiata di Sant'Andrea, the main city's monument. The church probably existed as early as the 5th century AD, and is mentioned in a papal bull of 1059. It was rebuilt in the 11th century by the pievano Rolando, by permission of the Countess Emilia dei Conti Guidi. In the mid of the following century, a Romanesque arcaded facade was added: it was decorated with bi-chrome marble stones, in a style inspired by the basilica of San Miniato in Florence. The green stones were from Prato, and the white ones are from Carrara: today the lower part of the original decoration remains. In 1735 the architect Ferdinando Ruggieri extensively modified the façade and the interior structure, including the ceiling. It houses noteworthy artworks including paintings by Francesco Botticini, a terracotta by Luca della Robbia, an altarpiece (1785) by Zanobi del Rosso and a triptych by Lorenzo di Bicci portraying the Madonna in Throne with Saints.
- The Palazzo Ghibellino is the former palace of the Guidi counts. It was probably erected in the 11th century. In 1260 it was the seat of the Ghibelline parliament where the fate of the Florence's Guelphs was decided. In the 16th century, the palace was restored, leaving little of the original structure, though.
- The Palazzo Pretorio was the Town Hall in the Middle Ages. Currently, it houses several activities, including an auditorium.

The house of the painter Pontormo is in the frazione (hamlet) of Pontorme.

== Sport ==
Empoli's main association football team is Empoli F.C., which is currently playing in the Serie B.

== Twin Town ==
- Sankt Georgen an der Gusen, Austria

== Notable people ==
- Farinata degli Uberti, real name Manente degli Uberti (1212–1264), politician leader [anti-Papal]
- Giovanni da Empoli (1483–1518), navigator
- Jacopo Carrucci, better known as Pontormo (1494–1556), painter
- Jacopo da Empoli (1551–1640), painter
- Alessandro Marchetti (1633–1714), mathematician and writer
- Giuseppe Del Papa (1648–1735), physician and philosopher
- Ippolito Neri (1652–1708), physician and poet
- Renato Fucini (1843–1921), writer
- Giuliano Vanghetti (1861–1940), orthopaedist
- Ferruccio Busoni (1866–1924), musician
- Alberto Castellani (1884–1932), Eastern countries scholar
- Mentore Maggini (1890–1941), astronomer
- Remo Scappini (1908–1994), politician and anti-Fascist militant
- Carlo Rovini (1932–1988), poet and writer
- Mario Panzani (1921–2016), painter and sculptor
