= Museum of the Risorgimento (Milan) =

Museum in Milan, Italy

Coordinates: 45°28′20″N 9°11′23″E

Museo del Risorgimento
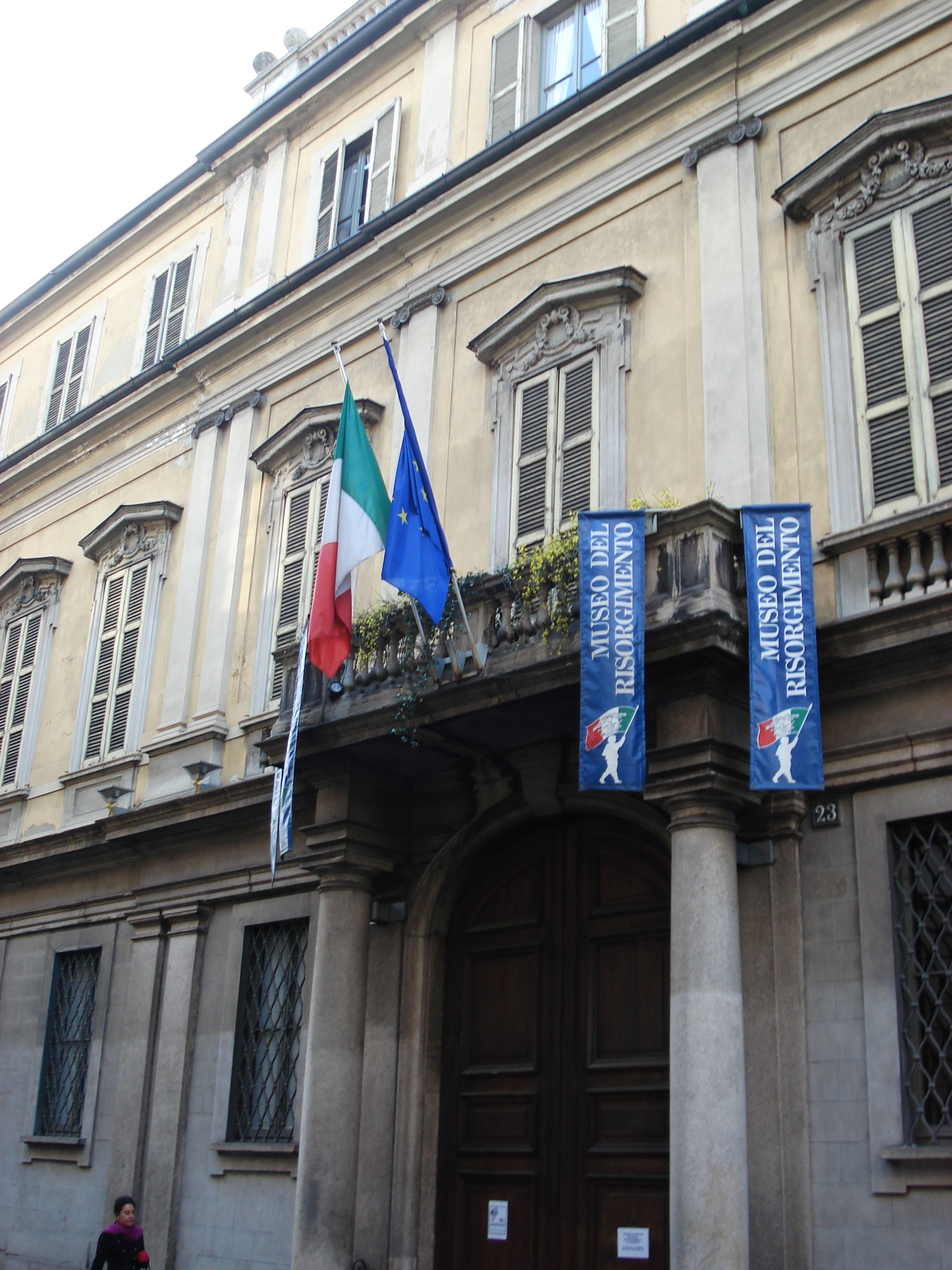
- Palazzo Moriggia
- Established: 1885 (since 1951 in the actual venue)
- Location: Via Borgonuovo, 23 - 20121 Milan, Italy
- Director: Marina Messina
- Website: www.museodelrisorgimento.mi.it

The Museum of the Risorgimento (Italian: Museo del Risorgimento), located in the 18th-century Milanese Palazzo Moriggia, houses a collection of objects and artworks which illustrate the history of Italian unification from Napoleon's Italian campaign of 1796 to the annexation of Rome in 1870. The city of Milan played a key role in the process, most notably on the occasion of the 1848 uprising against the Austrians known as the Five Days of Milan.

== Description ==
The museum was founded on a collection of documents on the Risorgimento, gathered for the Exhibition of Turin in 1884 and then moved to the showroom at Milan’s Public Gardens. The exhibition was later transferred to the Rocchetta rooms at the Sforza Castle, where it was officially inaugurated on 24 June 1896. In 1943, due to the war-time bombardment of the castle, the museum was temporarily moved to the estate of Casa Manzoni (home of the famed Italian poet and novelist Alessandro Manzoni). Finally in 1951 it was housed inside the Moriggia Palace, where it remains today.

The museum is part of the Civic Historical Collections. Its collections include Baldassare Verazzi's Episode from the Five Days and Francesco Hayez's 1840 Portrait of Emperor Ferdinand I of Austria. The permanent exhibition is displayed to follow the chronological order of events of the Risorgimento, leading the visitor through fifteen rooms, to which the new Weapons Room has been recently added. The latest refurbishment in 1998 included the redesign of the permanent exhibitions, to accentuate the highlights of the collections, particularly the relics.

The museum boasts the green-and-silver velvet cloak and the valuable regal insignia of Napoleon Bonaparte’s coronation, the banner of the Legione Lombarda Cacciatori a Cavallo (Lombard Legion on Horseback) and the first Italian flag. The last renovation saw the redesign of the lighting and information systems, as well as improvements to the ‘Romantic Garden’ behind the building.

== The palace ==
The Moriggia Palace, which houses the museum, was designed in 1775 by Giuseppe Piermarini. It is located behind the vast area of Brera, and was the residence, in Napoleonic times, of the Ministry of Foreign Affairs and later, the Ministry of Defence. At the beginning of the 20th century, the palace passed to the De Marchi family and was then donated to the City of Milan by his wife of the famous naturalist Marco De Marchi.

== Gallery ==
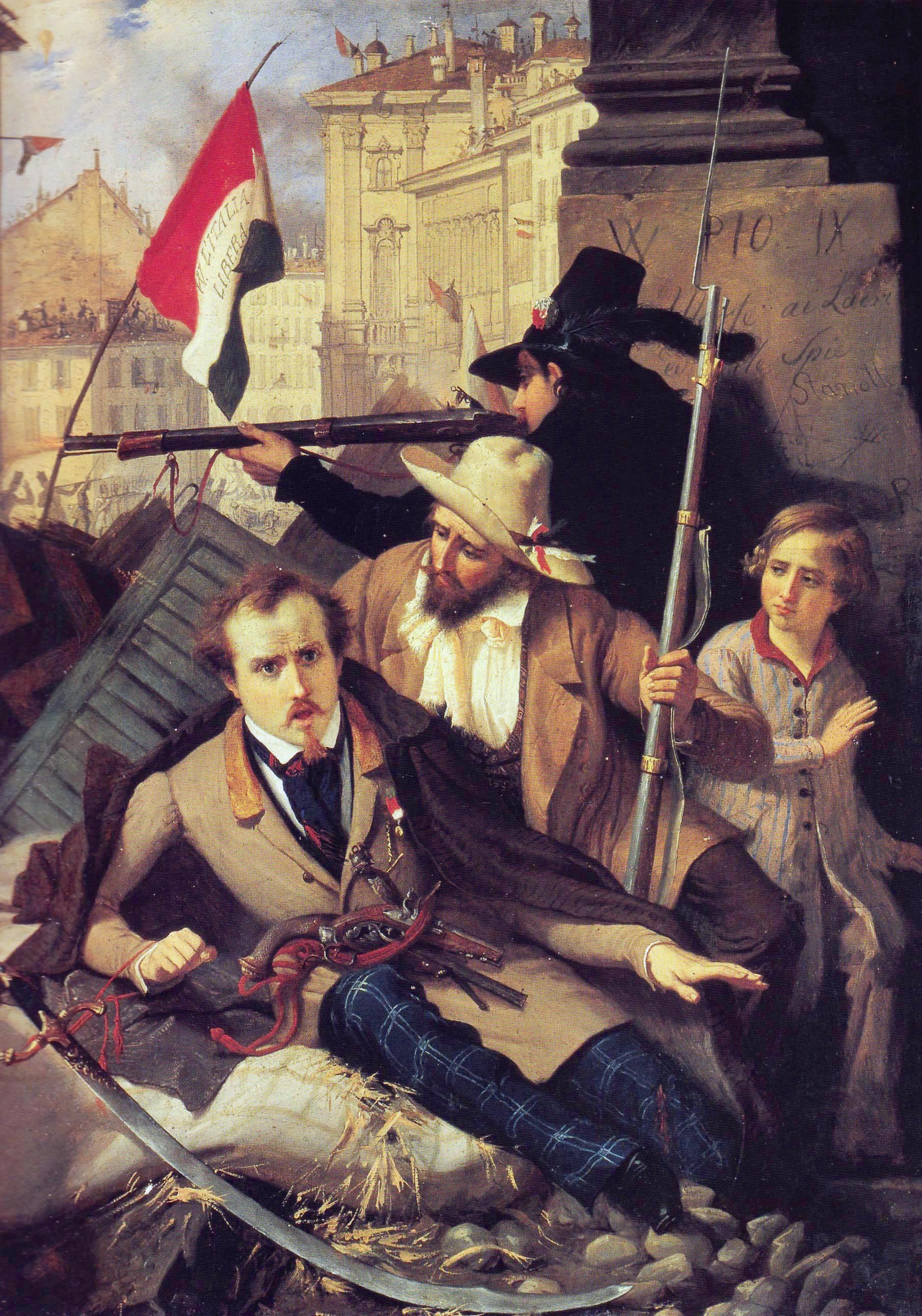
Episode from the Five Days (Fighting at Palazzo Litta), by Baldassare Verazzi

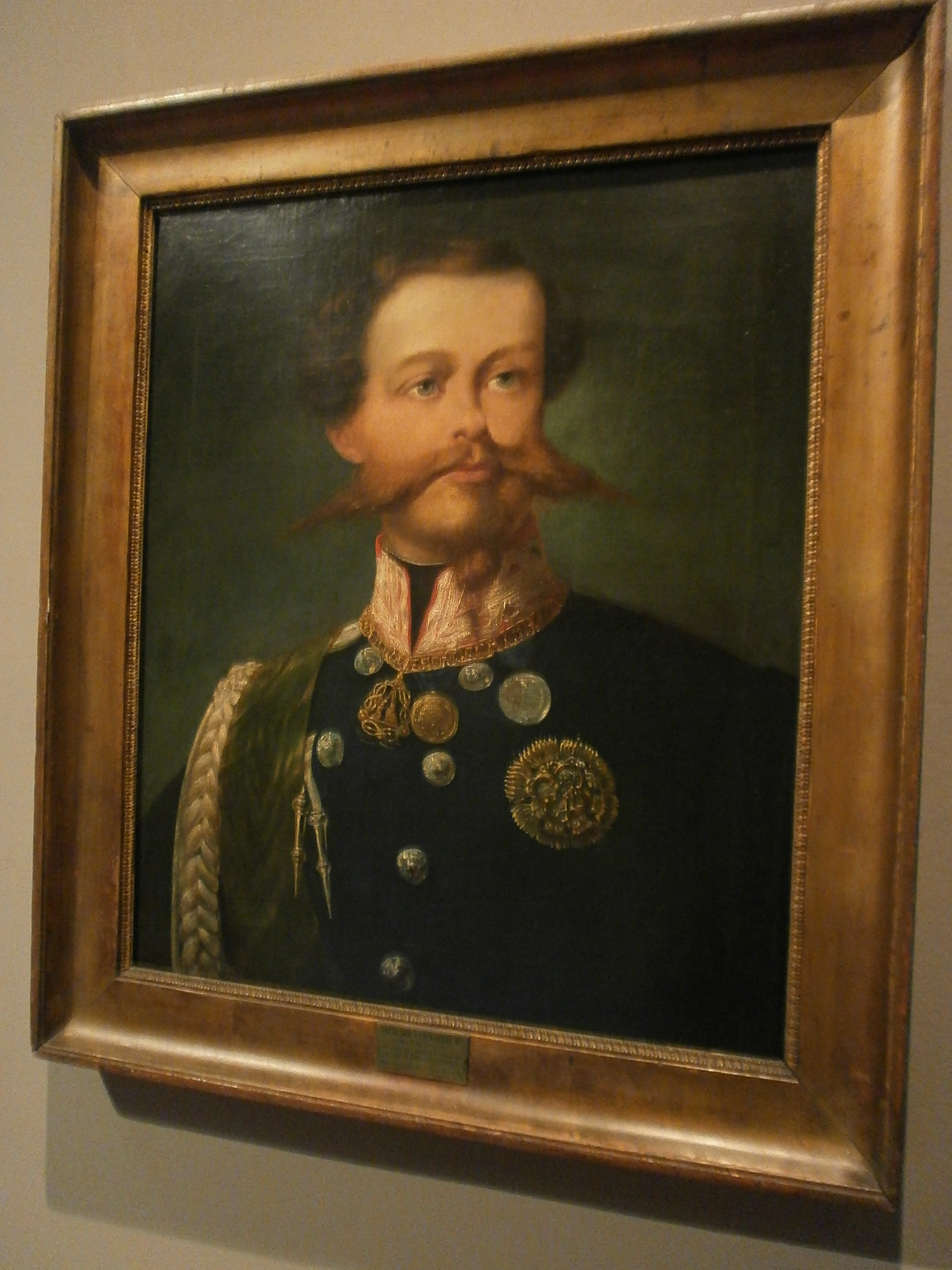
Vittorio Emanuele Duca di Savoia, Gerolamo Induno, 1850.

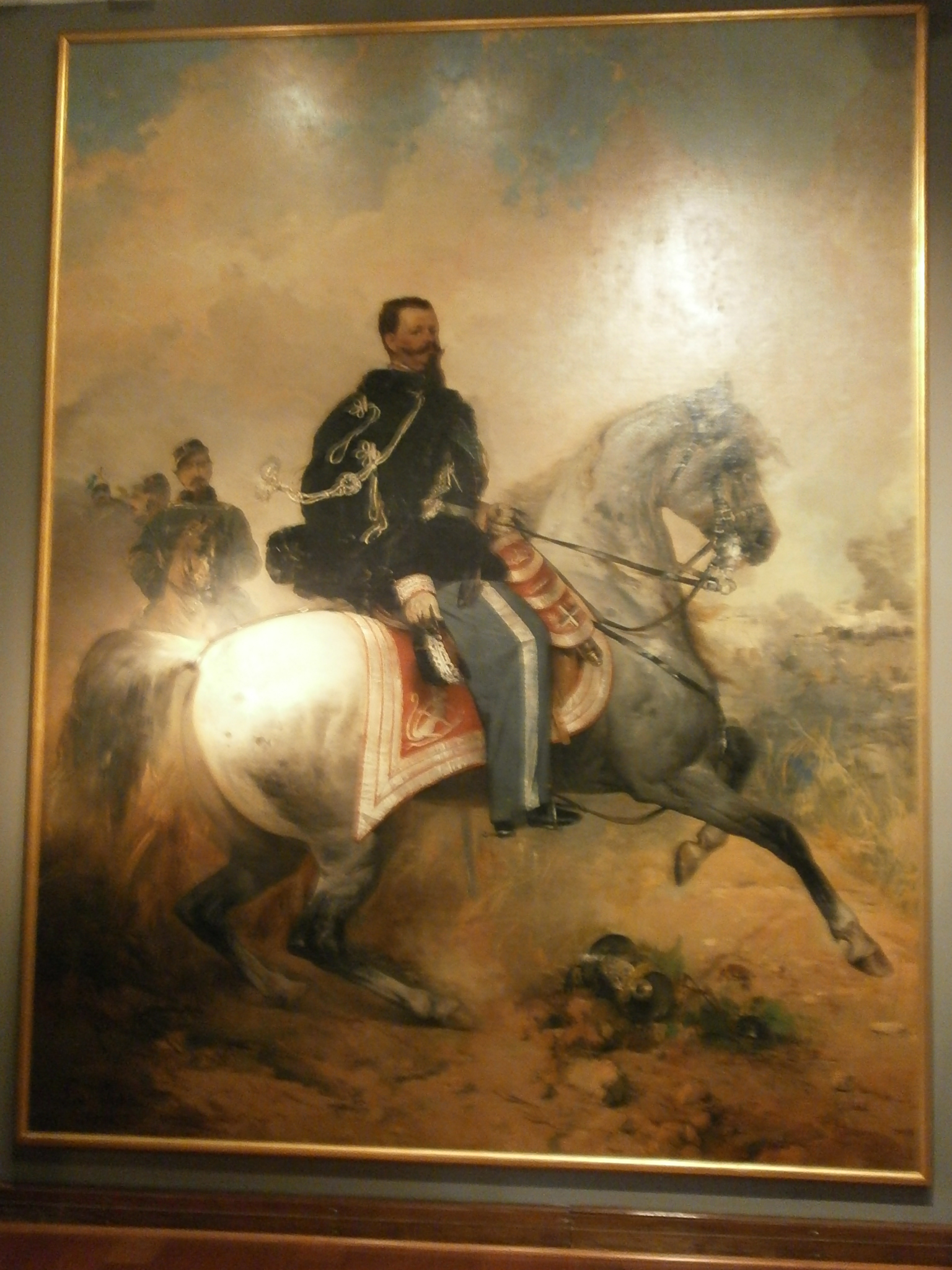
Vittorio Emanuele II on horse, Gerolamo Induno, 1861.

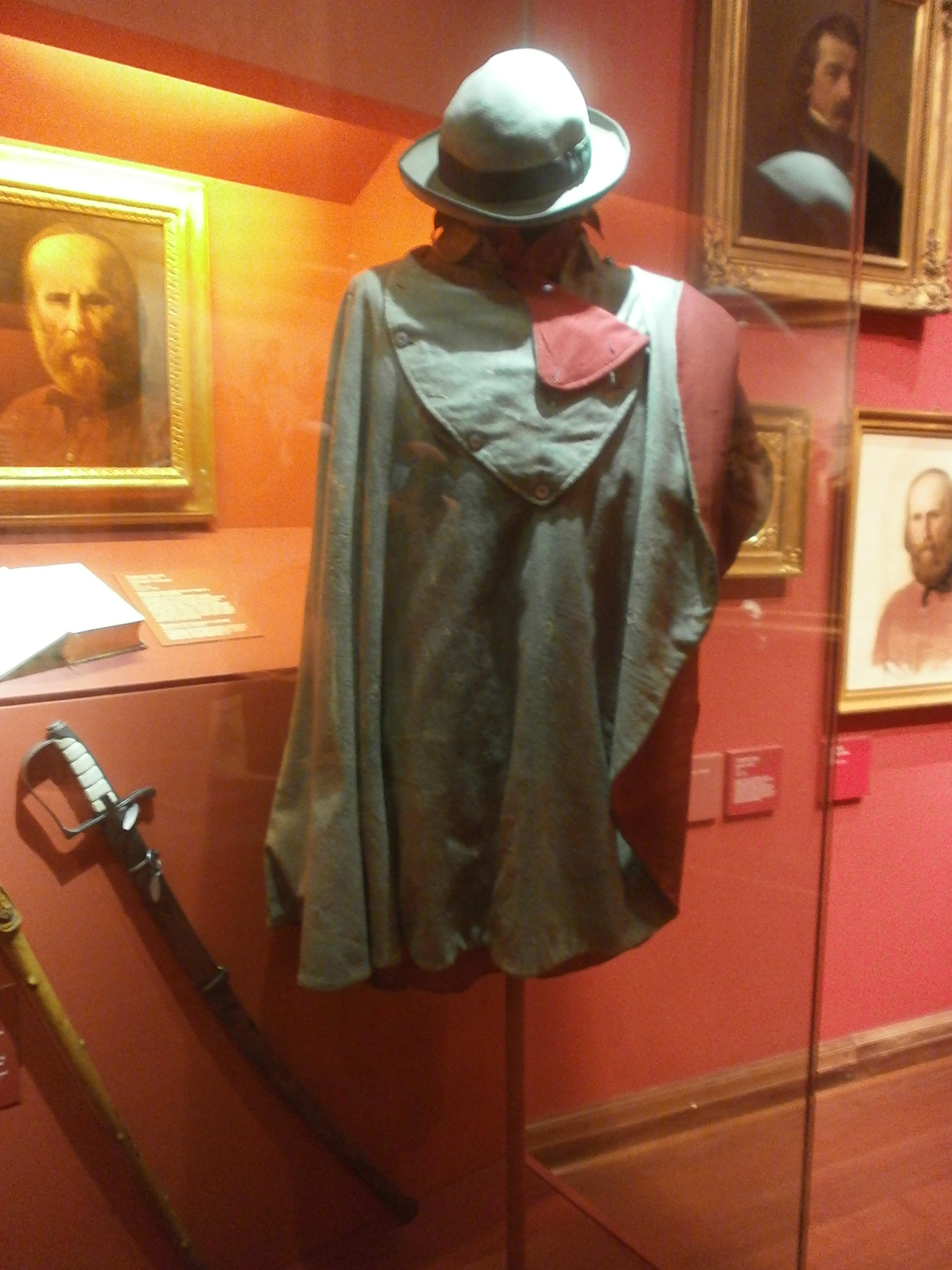
Poncho and red shirt of Giuseppe Garibaldi.

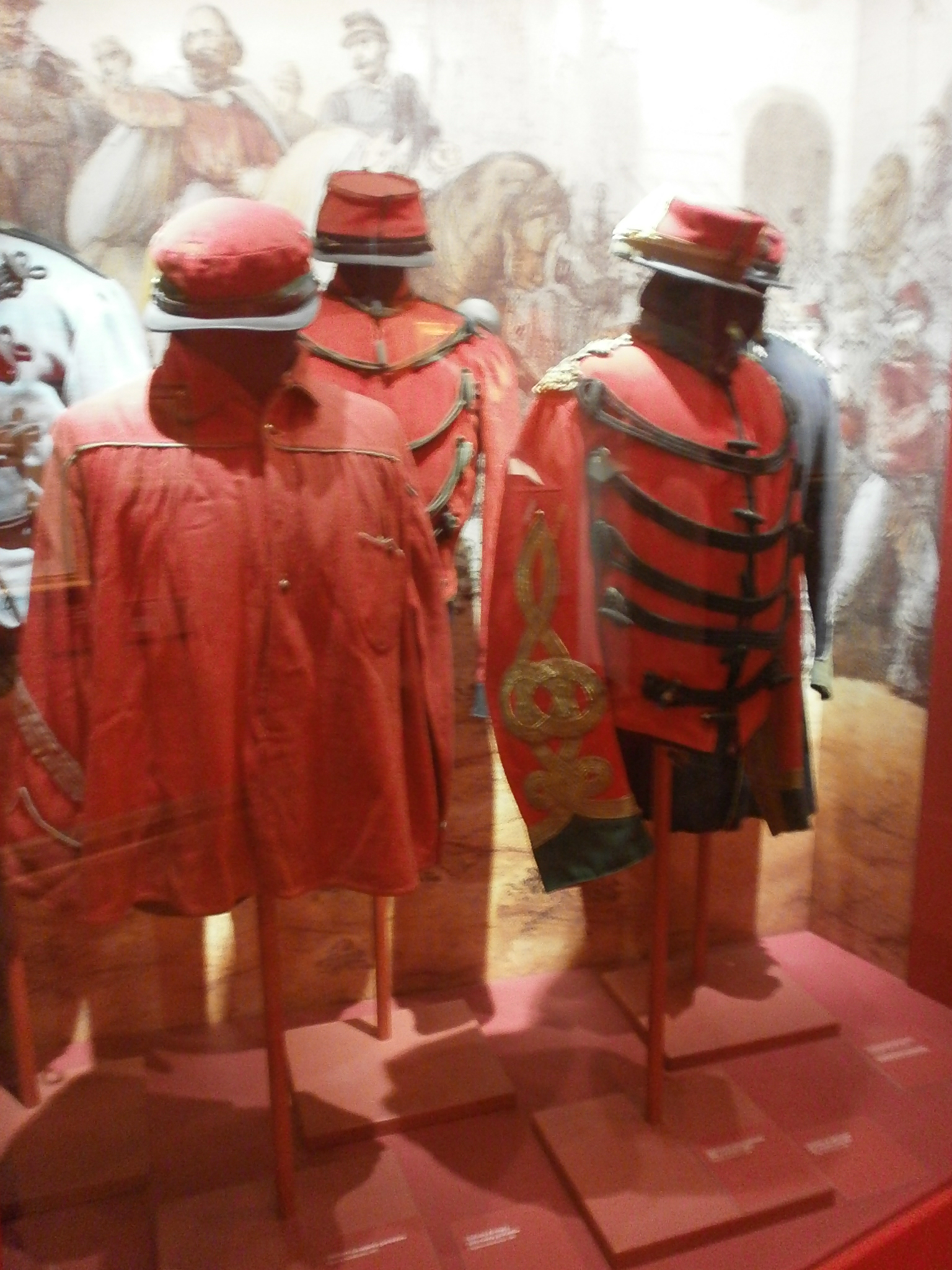
Uniforms of the garibaldines.

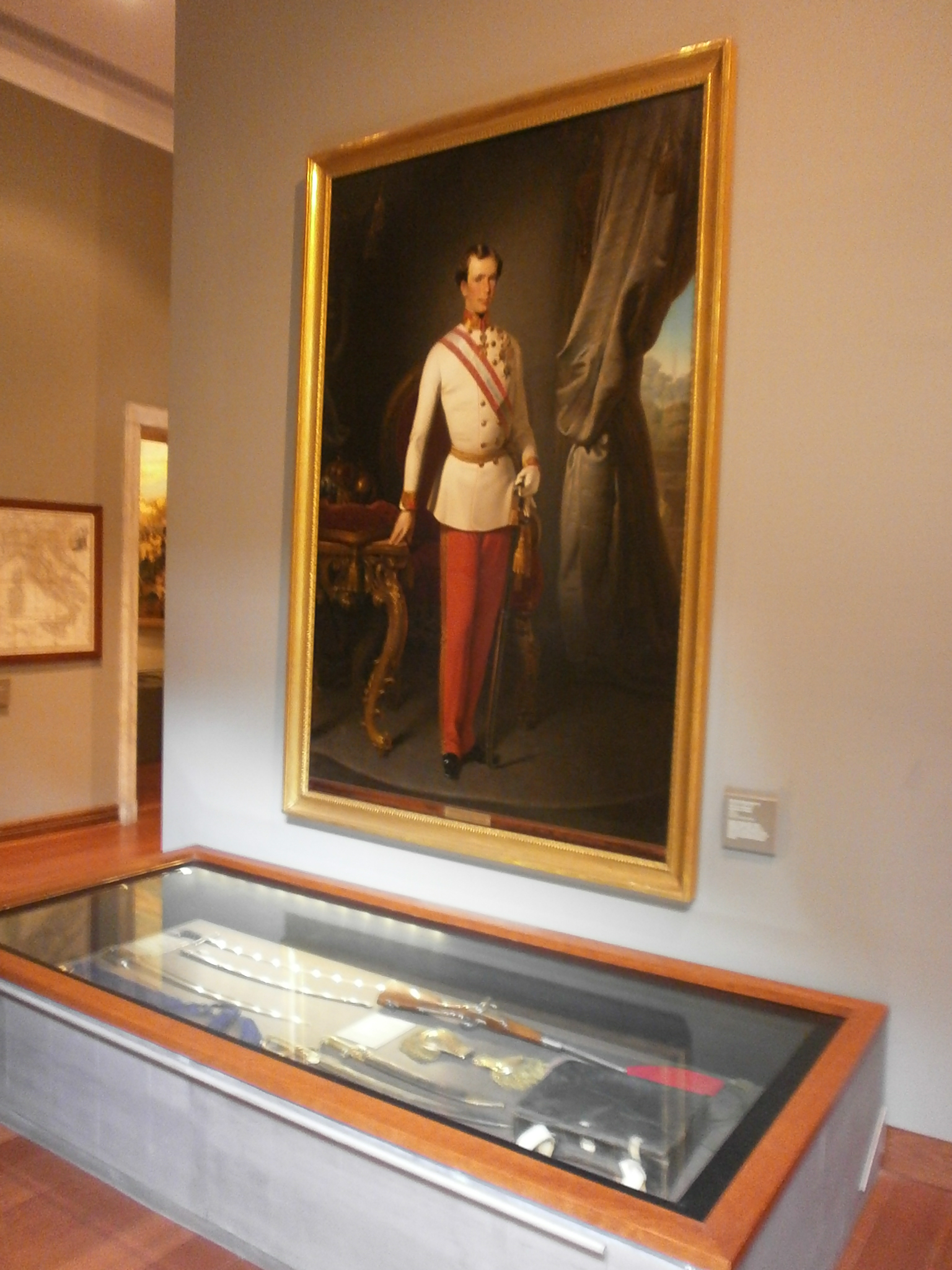
Franz Joseph I of Austria, Francesco Hayez, 1852.

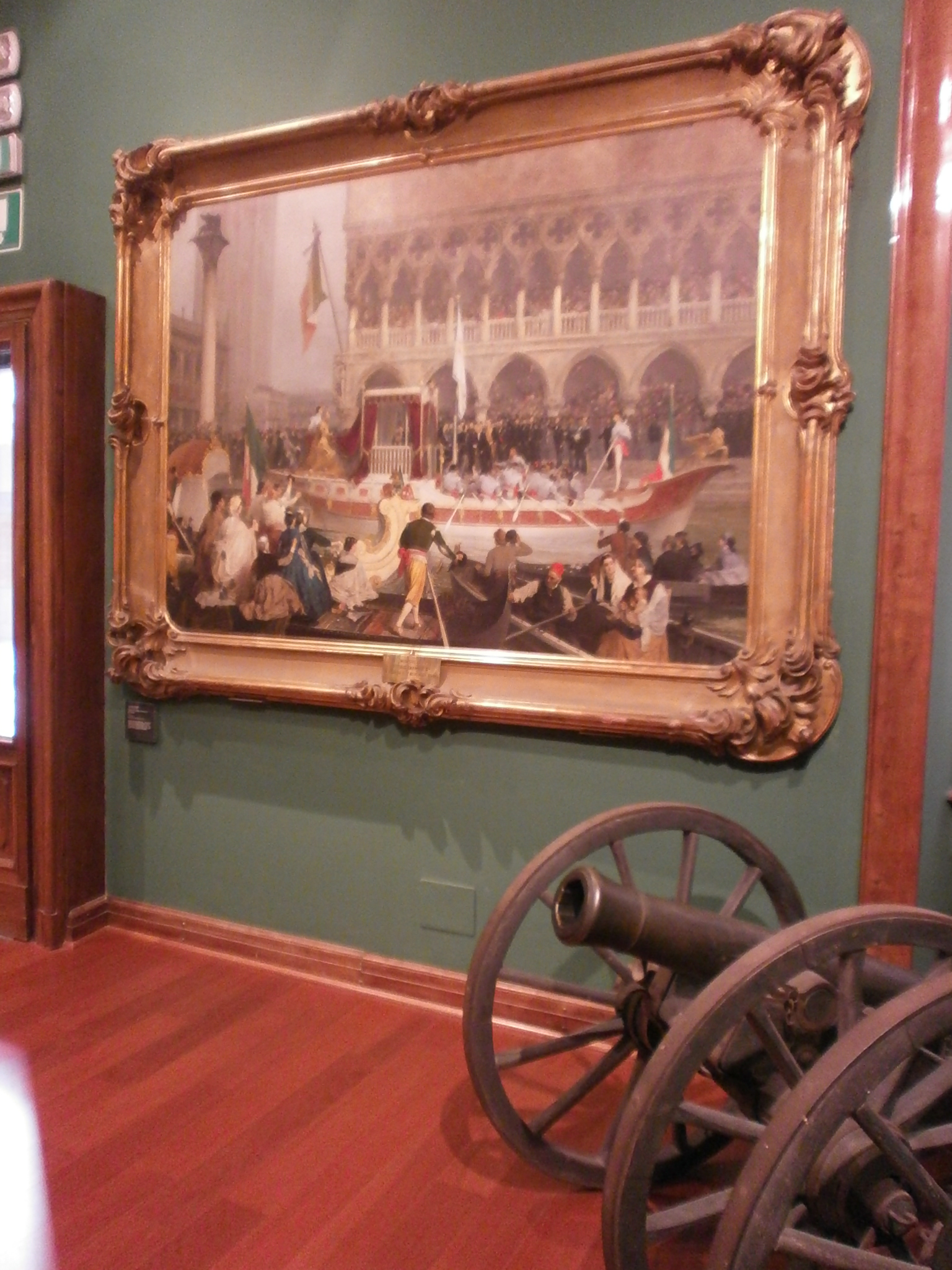
Entry of Vittorio Emanuele II in Venice, Gerolamo Induno, 1866.
