= Pozzale =

City in Italy

Coordinates: 43.6958°N 10.9565°E

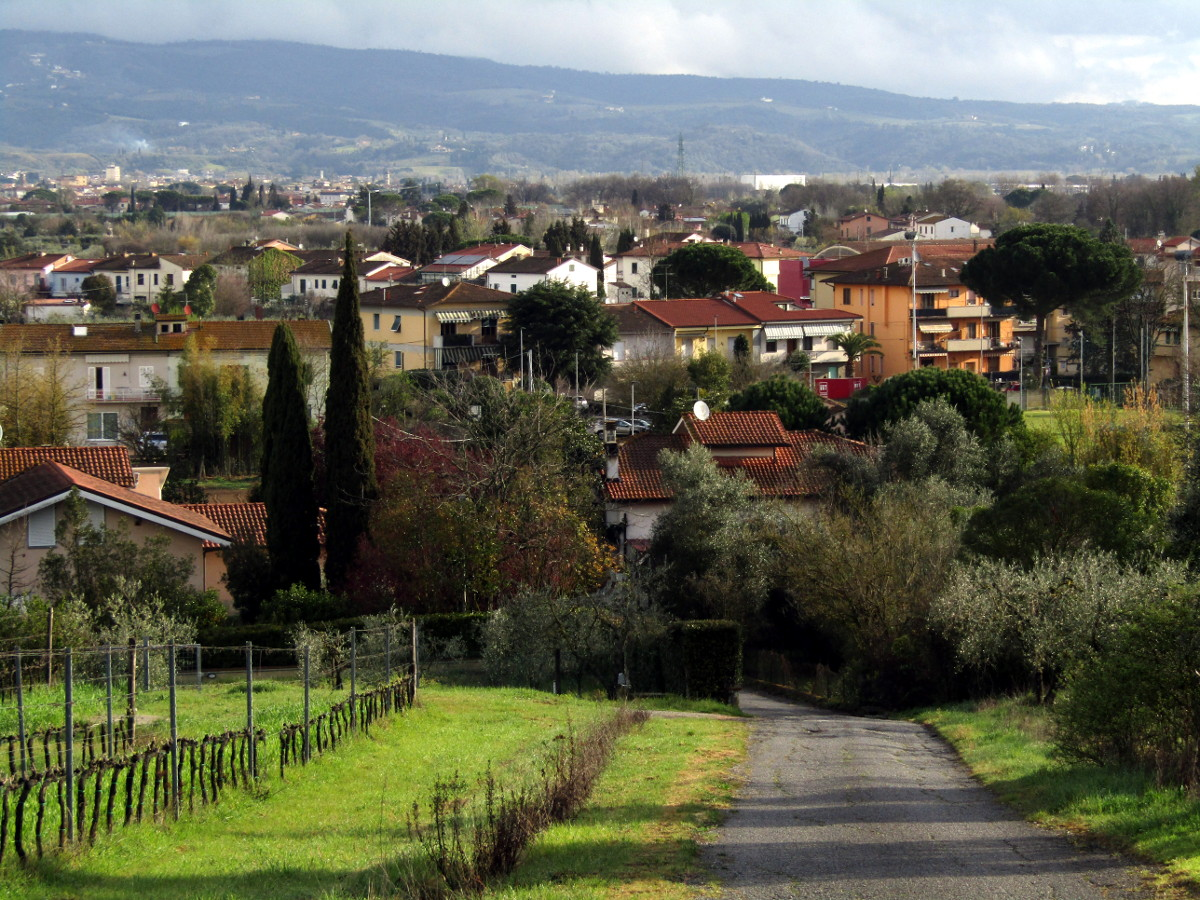
Pozzale

Pozzale is a frazione in Empoli commune, Metropolitan City of Florence.

It was the site of a medium-security women's prison. In 2010, it was announced that it would be converted into a facility exclusively for transgender prisoners, making it the first such facility in the world. However, the project was later cancelled by the Ministry of Justice and as of 2013, the prison had resumed its normal operation as a women's prison. In 2020, the prison was converted to a REMS (Residenza per l'Esecuzione delle Misure di Sicurezza) for mentally ill people who have committed crimes, replacing the old asylum-like hospital-prison placed in Villa Medicea L'Ambrogiana.

It used to be the seat of a literary award called Premio Pozzale (now set in Empoli).
