= Marcuzzi =

Marcuzzi is an Italian surname. Notable people with the surname include:

- Alessia Marcuzzi (born 1972), Italian television personality and actress
- Angelo Marcuzzi (died 1453), Roman Catholic prelate, Bishop of Telese
- Michael Marcuzzi, American visual effects artist
- Santé Marcuzzi (1934–2020), French rower
- Sebastiano Marcuzzi (1725-1790) Italian abbot from Friuli and writer of texts on religion
