= Palazzo Marchetti, Pistoia =

Coordinates: 43.934456°N 10.914132°E

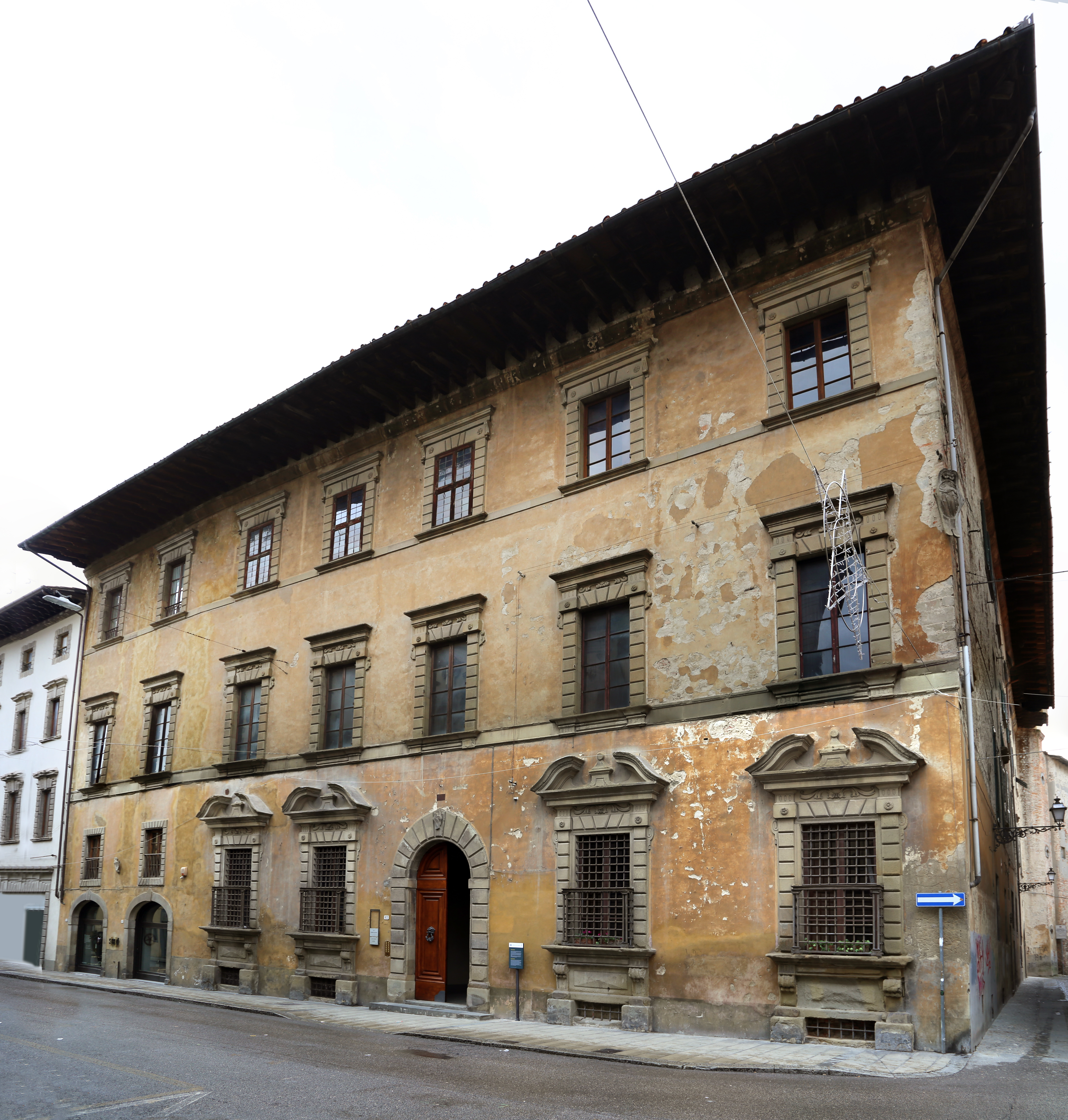
Facade of Palazzo Marchetti

The Palazzo Marchetti is a Baroque-style palace located at Via Curtatone e Montanara in central Pistoia, Tuscany, Italy. The palace, which once served as a civic art gallery, is used in 2019 as a civic archive for various family collections of documents.

== Description ==
The design of the palace is attributed to Giovanni Battista Baldi, under the patronage of the cavaliere Orazio Marchetti, who purchased the property in the 1650s from the Cellesi family, and joined it to adjacent properties. The interiors were frescoed by Giovanni Domenico Ferretti. At one time, the palace held a prized art collection. This was the home where the astronomer Angelo Marchetti was born. A 17th-century bishop of Arezzo, Giovanni Matteo Marchetti, was also from this family.
