= Giuseppe Del Papa =

Italian physician and philosopher (1648–1735)

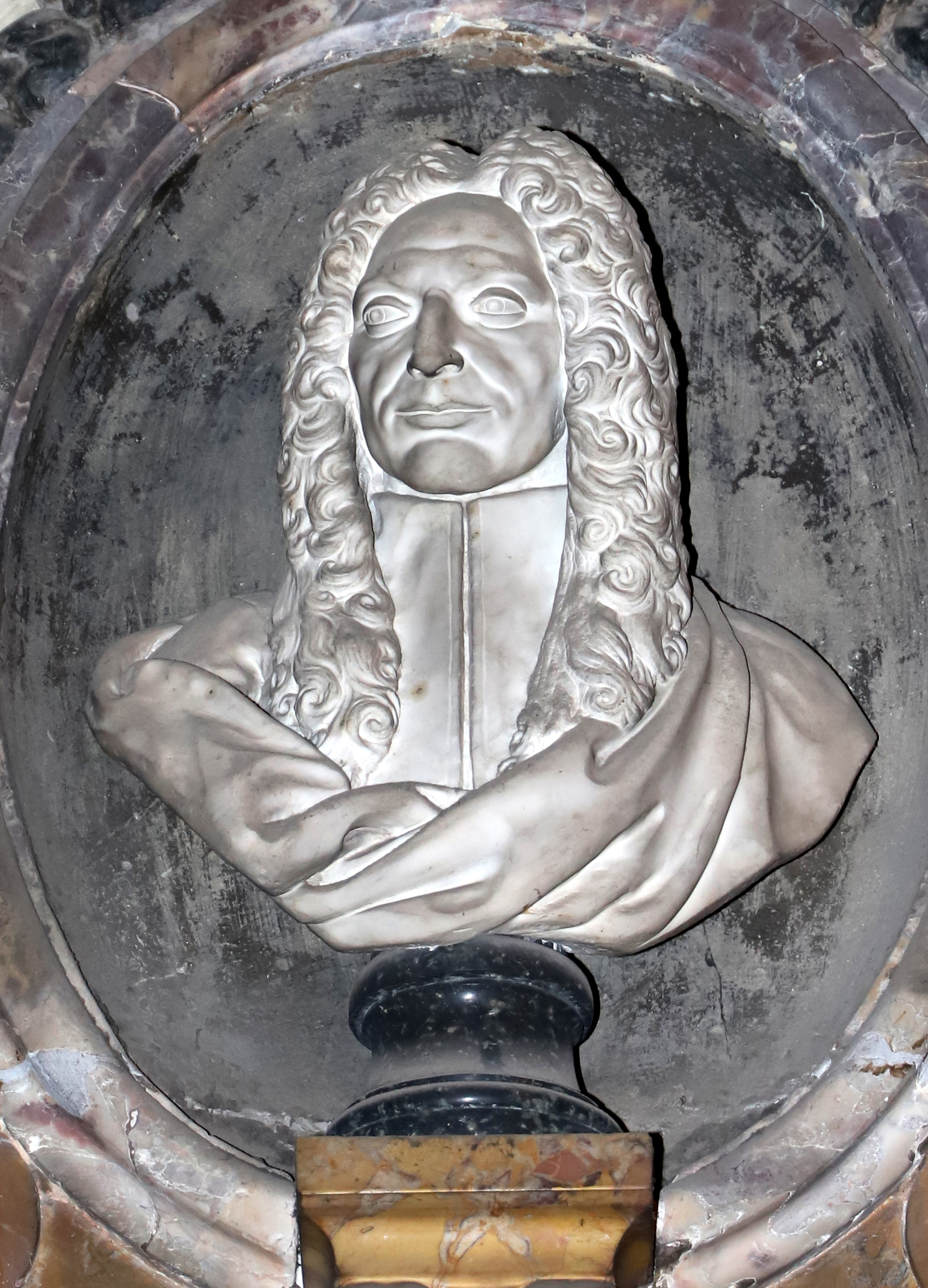
- Born: 1 March 1648; Empoli
- Died: 13 March 1735 (aged 87); Florence
- Occupation: Medical doctor, logician

Giuseppe Del Papa (1 March 1648 – 13 March 1735) was an Italian physician, philosopher, and logician.

== Biography ==
He was the son of Marco Del Papa and Elisabetta Canneri. He studied law at the University of Pisa, later switching to medicine, whose professors followed the Galileo Galilei and Accademia del Cimento inspiration, particularly Alessandro Marchetti (mathematician), Lorenzo Bellini, Donato Rossetti and Francesco Redi.

He graduated about 1670, and in 1671 he obtained the reading of Logic and in 1675 the extraordinary reading of philosophy. He studied the comet of 1680.

== Works ==
- Lettera nella quale si discorre se il fuoco e la luce siano una cosa medesima (in Italian). Florence: Giovanni Antonio Bonardi. 1675.
- Della natura dell'umido e del secco (in Italian). Florence: Vincenzo Vangelisti. 1681.
- Trattati varj fatti in diverse occasioni (in Italian). Florence: Giovanni Gaetano Tartini & Santi Franchi. 1734.
