= Baldassare Verazzi =

Italian painter

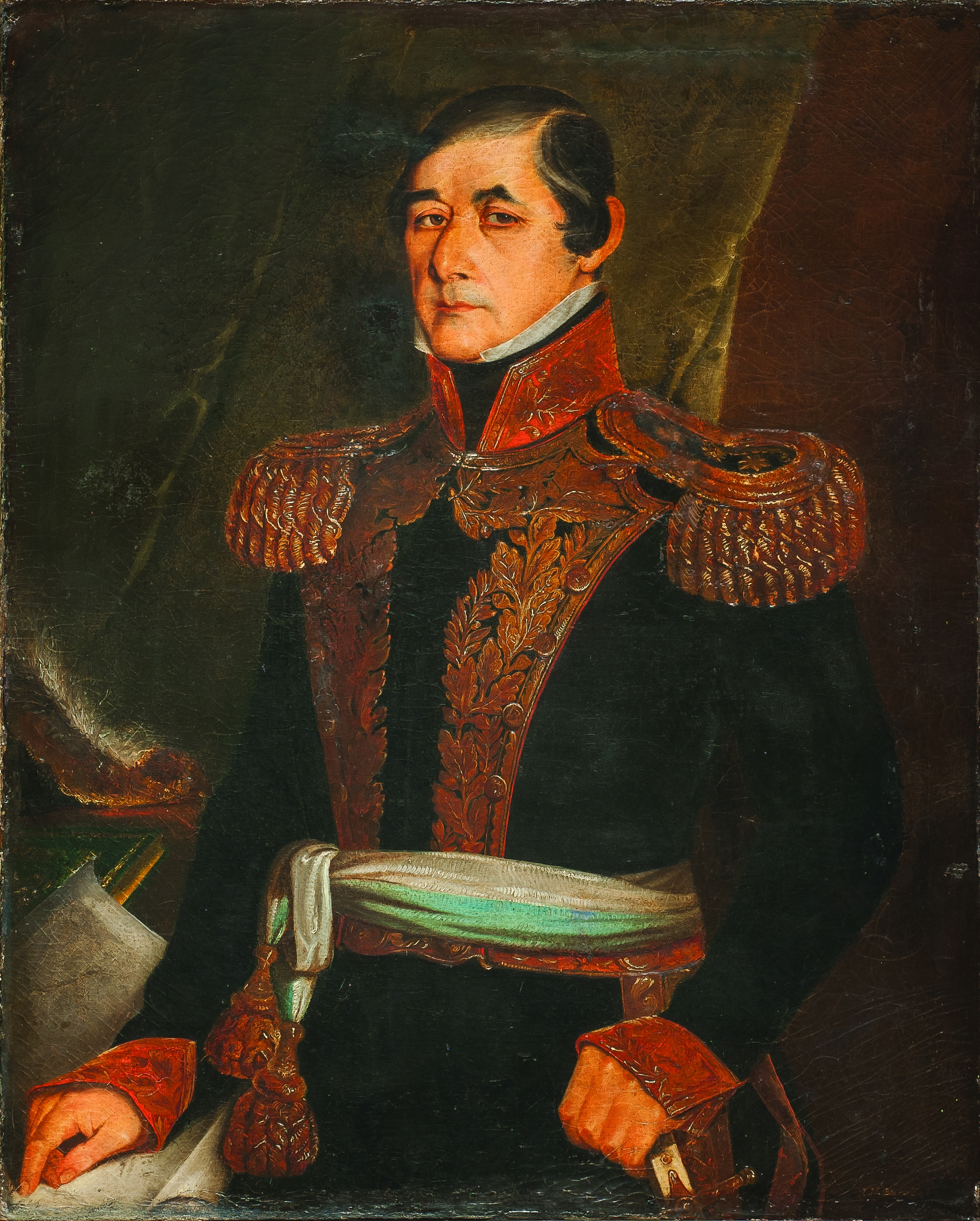
Portrait of Fructuoso Rivera

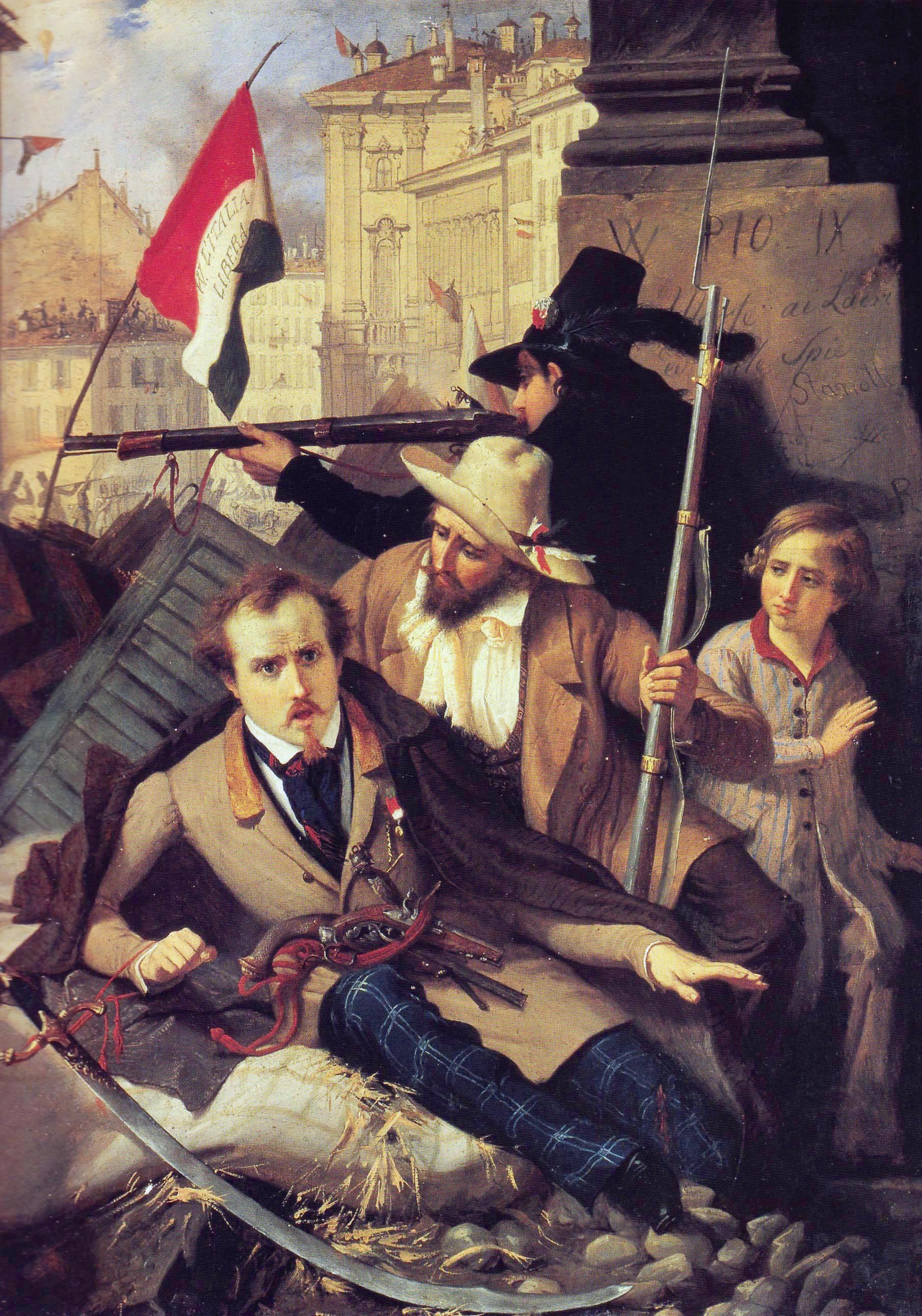
Episode from the Five Days (Fighting at Palazzo Litta)

Baldassare Verazzi (6 January 1819 – 18 January 1886) was an Italian painter.

== Life ==
Verazzi was born in Caprezzo, Verbano-Cusio-Ossola, Piedmont. He studied at the Academy of Brera at Milan from 1833 to 1842, then under the Venetian Romantic painter Francesco Hayez (1791–1882) in 1851, and participated in several exhibitions in Turin and Milan.

He took his inspiration from history (painting a fresco on The life of Leonardo da Vinci) and religion (The Holy Family in Egypt, the 1851 The parable of the Samaritan and the 1854 Raffaello Sanzio da Urbino presented by Bramante to Pope Julius II). His masterpiece (now at the Museum of the Risorgimento in Milan) is considered to be Episodio delle Cinque Giornate (Combattimento a Palazzo Litta) - known in English as Episode from the Five Days (Fighting at Palazzo Litta).

Heavily involved in the Risorgimento, he was hunted down by the Austrian authorities in 1848 and forced to live under severe proscriptions. He left for Argentina in 1856, where he taught (the Argentine painter Cándido López was his student) and painted local personalities, scenes of everyday life and history paintings of political or military events. He also decorated the original Teatro Colón. He returned to Italy and installed himself near Lake Maggiore, and the landscape of that area proved a new source of inspiration for paintings that he then produced with his son Serafino (1875–1945). He died in Lesa, aged 67.

== Bibliography ==
- Tullio Manacorda, Los pintores del Museo Historico. Baltasar Verazzi, in "Revista Historica", tomo X, n. 28, 1922.
- Ezio Brambilla, Baldassare Verazzi, in "Le Vie d`Italia e dell`America Latina", 1929.
- Fabio Copiatti et Valerio Cirio, Baldassare & Serafino Verazzi, Pittori del lago Maggiore Due vite tra Verbano, Milano e America Latina, Alberti Libraio - Magazzeno Storico Verbanese - La Compagnia de' Bindoni, 2006
- Valerio Cirio et Fabio Copiatti, Una visita alla casa del pittore Baldassare Verazzi, a Lesa... (2007), in "Antiquarium Medionovarese", II (2007), Arona 2007, pp. 429-442.
- Fabio Copiatti et Valerio Cirio, L’opera di Baldassare Verazzi, pittore verbanese, nella chiesa di San Martino a Malnate, in ”La Cava 2007" (XIV), Varese, 2007, pp. 7–19.

== Sources ==
- (in Italian) Biography of Baldassare Verazzi on the Magazzeno storico Verbanese site
