= Aaron Markovich of Wilna =

Aaron Markovich of Wilna was an agent (court Jew) of King Władysław IV Vasa of Poland in the 17th century.

The only known document in which his name occurs is a letter, dated January 11, 1638, in the official correspondence between the Russian and Polish courts during the reign of Michael I of Russia, the first Russian ruler of the Romanov dynasty. In it Władysław asks of the Tsar permission for Aaron Markovich, "the king's agent," to visit Moscow for the purpose of purchasing (with the privilege of exemption from custom duties) certain utensils for the royal household; also that he be allowed to take with him, for sale, some "precious goods." This request, together with the fact that Władysław was not very favorably disposed toward the Jews, is evidence of the influential standing of Aaron with the Polish king. The Tsar did not grant the request, stating that "The Jews have never come to Moscow, and the Christians must not communicate with them".
