= Sebastiano Marcuzzi =

Italian abbot and writer

Sebastiano Marcuzzi (20 September 1725 – 19 February 1790) was an Italian abbot and writer, mainly on religious subjects.

== Biography ==
He was born in Treviso to a father who was a local professor of music, and prominent organist. His initial education was with the Somaschi order. He soon learned Latin, Greek, and Hebrew, studying with Padre Carmeli from the University of Padua and the abbot Camillo Oliva. By the 1750s, he began writing treatises on ancient texts. In 1762, he was made a member of the academies of Cividale and of Udine. He was appointed in 1763 to a teaching position in the seminary of Treviso, and a professorship of canon law by 1770. He was made rector of a local parish in 1774. Among his works are:

- Dissertatio in Matthaei XIX, quicumque dimiserit, etc. in qua hic locus ex Hebreorum antiquitatibus illustratur, et catholicae sententiae auctoritas vindicatur (1752)
- Dissertazione sopra i miracoli (1761)
- Riflessione e pratiche per le differenti feste e tempi dell'anno (1762)
- Discorso sopra la passione di Nostro Signore (1765)
- Epistola pastoralis Girolamo Errico Beltramini Miazzi, bishop of Feltre (1778)
