= Marczewski =

Marczewski (feminine Marczewska) is a Polish surname. Notable people with the surname include:

- Edward Marczewski, Polish mathematician
- Frank-Michael Marczewski, German footballer
- Sławomir Marczewski (1950–2024), Polish politician
- Teresa Marczewska, Polish actress
- Wojciech Marczewski, Polish film director
