= Stefano De Marchi =

Italian mathematician and professor

- Born: 17 December 1962 (age 63); Candiana, Padua, Italy
- Education: University of Padua
- Known for: Polynomial and radial basis function approximation
- Awards: Habilitation (2017)
- Scientific career
- Fields: Numerical analysis, Approximation theory
- Workplaces: University of Padua
- Doctoral advisor: Maria Morandi Cecchi, Larry Lee Schumaker
- Website: Personal webpage

Stefano De Marchi (born 17 December 1962 in Candiana, Padua) is an Italian mathematician who works in numerical analysis and is a professor at the University of Padua. He is the founder and managing editor of the open-access journal Dolomites Research Notes on Approximation published by the Padua University Press, coordinator of the Constructive Approximation and Applications Research Group till 2025, coordinator of the Italian Research Network on Approximation from 2017 to 2020, and Responsible for the Unione Matematica Italiana Thematic Group on "Approximation Theory and Applications (A.T.A.)" from 2000 to 2026.

His scientific interests deal mainly with interpolation and approximation of functions and data by polynomials and radial basis functions (RBFs)).

== Education and career ==
Stefano De Marchi studied a Bachelor's degree in Mathematics from 1981-1987, a Master's in Applied Mathematics in 1991 at the University of Padua, and received his doctorate in Computational Mathematics, Consorzio Nord-Orientale, VI ciclo, University of Padua under Maria Morandi Cecchi and Larry Lee Schumaker supervision (dissertation: Approssimazione e Interpolazione su "Simplices": Caratterizzazioni, Metodi ed Estensioni)

He habilitated in 2017 and became a Full Professor of Numerical Analysis at the Department of Mathematics “Tullio Levi-Civita”, University of Padua in 2022. From 2025 he is a faculty member of the Department of Medicine of the same University.

== Research ==
Stefano has made contributions to approximation theory, such as Weakly Admissible Meshes, Barycentric rational interpolation, Stability issues, greedy algorithms in RBF theory, Rational RBF approximation, Medical image reconstruction, and Fake nodes. He is one of the discoverers of the so called Padua points, which are the only set of quasi-optimal interpolation points explicitly known on the square, for polynomial interpolation of total degree. Their name is due to the University of Padua, where they were originally discovered. He is also author of the books: "Kernel-Based Methods", ′′Funzioni Splines Univariate″, ′′Appunti di Calcolo Numerico″, ′′Meshfree Approximation for Multi-Asset European and American Option Problems″ and the Lecture notes: ′′Four lectures on radial basis functions″ and '′Lectures on multivariate polynomial interpolation″.
