= John Markowitz =

American physician

John C. Markowitz (born 1954 in New York City) is an American physician, a Professor of Clinical Psychiatry at the Columbia University College of Physicians & Surgeons and a Research Psychiatrist at the New York State Psychiatric Institute. For several decades he has conducted research on psychotherapies and medications as treatments for mood disorders (major depressive disorder and dysthymic disorder), anxiety disorders, and personality disorders, and more recently posttraumatic stress disorder (PTSD). He is most widely published in the area of interpersonal psychotherapy or IPT, a manualized form of treatment, in which he was trained by the late Gerald L. Klerman, M.D. Dr. Markowitz is a graduate of Columbia University and Columbia University College of Physicians and Surgeons and received his psychiatric residency training at the Payne Whitney Psychiatric Clinic of Cornell University Medical School/New York-Presbyterian Hospital.
