= Adevildo De Marchi =

Italian footballer (1894–1965)

Personal information
- Date of birth: 16 March 1894
- Place of birth: Genoa, Italy
- Date of death: 29 May 1965 (aged 71)
- Place of death: Genoa, Italy
- Position: Forward

Senior career*
Years	Team	Apps	(Gls)
1919–1921	Andrea Doria		
1921–1922	Genoa	1	(0)
1925–1926	Sarzano		

International career
1920	Italy	1	(0)
- * Club domestic league appearances and goals

Adevildo De Marchi (Italian pronunciation: [adeˈvildo de ˈmarki]; 16 March 1894 – 29 May 1965) was an Italian footballer who played as a forward. He competed for Italy in the men's football tournament at the 1920 Summer Olympics.
