= Louis Marchetti =

Italian artist

- Born: 1920; Fondi, Italy
- Died: 1992
- Known for: Paperback book covers
- Children: 1
- Website: loumarchetti.com

Louis J. Marchetti (1920–1992), known as Lou Marchetti, was an Italian free-lance illustrator and fine artist. He was best known for his paperback book covers.

== Biography ==
He was born in Fondi, Italy and immigrated to the United States at an early age. He attended Bryant High School on Long Island, New York and later studied for five years at the Art Students League of New York with two scholarships.

As an editorial illustrator, he created numerous book covers and illustrations, primarily for Dell Books, Pocket Books, Lancer Books, Paperback Library, and Popular Library. His creative work extended into posters for the motion picture industry, promotional illustrations for television (I Spy NBC), magazine illustration True (magazine), Galaxy, and Reader's Digest, as well as a series of religious collector's plates offered by the Danbury Mint.

His fine art appeared in several galleries across the United States, including the Grand Central Art Galleries (New York). Marchetti's fine art often reflected the Lazio provincial Italian countryside near his place of birth.

He was a member of the Society of Illustrators.

== Personal life ==
He had a daughter named Louise Marchetti Zeitlin.
