= Juan De Marchi =

Italian anarchist (1866–1943)

Juan De Marchi (10 June 1866 – 1943) was an Italian-born anarchist. He is best known for his friendship and influential role in the development of Salvador Allende's political identity.

== Biography ==
Giovanni De Marchi, whose surname was also spelt as Demarchi, was born in Turin, the former capital of the Kingdom of Italy. In 1893, when he was twenty-seven, De Marchi moved from Italy to Argentina, where he was involved with the Latin-American anarchist movement that arose around the newspaper Umanità Nova, stoked by figures such as Pietro Gori and Errico Malatesta. Later on, he moved to Chile, where he worked as a shoemaker in Valparaíso, where he would later meet Salvador Allende himself. When De Marchi was about sixty-three years old, Allende was attending high school at the Liceo Eduardo de la Barra in Valparaíso. It was at that time that the adolescent Allende came into contact with De Marchi's political and intellectual ideas. As Allende once said:

When I was a boy, aged about fourteen or fifteen years, after the lessons at the high school of Valparaíso, I usually was going in the workshop of a shoemaker, Juan De Marchi, an Italian anarchist, by whom I was eager to stop exchanging opinions about foreign and national situation. De Marchi was aged 63 at the time, and he willingly agreed to talk to me about events of life; he even lent me his books and, furthermore, he taught me to play chess.

— Salvador Allende at Jaime Massardo

According to other interviewers, De Marchi had an important role in shaping Allende's ideology. The relationship between De Marchi and Allende played a significant role in Roberto Ampuero's Spanish language novel El Último Tango de Salvador Allende (The Last Tango of Salvador Allende). De Marchi died in 1943 during World War II.
