= Mentore Maggini =

Italian astronomer

Mentore Maggini (6 February 1890 – 8 May 1941) was an Italian astronomer.

He was director of the Collurania Observatory and is best known for his maps of Mars and the work on binary stars.

A crater on Mars was named in his honor.
