= DeMarco =

DeMarco or Dimarcco is a name, originally meaning son of Marco.

== As a surname ==
- Ab DeMarco, Canadian ice hockey player
- Ab DeMarco Jr., American ice hockey player and Ab DeMarco's son
- Antonio DeMarco, Mexican boxer
- Bert Demarco, Scottish snooker player
- Bob DeMarco, American football player (active 1961–75)
- Brian DeMarco, American football player (active 1995–99)
- Edward DeMarco acting director of the Federal Housing Finance Agency (FHFA)
- Hugo Demarco, Argentine-French painter
- Laura DeMarco, mathematician and professor at Harvard University
- Mac DeMarco, Canadian musician
- Richard Demarco CBE, Scottish artist
- Tom DeMarco, American software engineer and author
- Tamara Elisabet DeMarco, Argentine boxer
- Tony DeMarco, American boxer
- Tony DeMarco (dancer), American vaudeville dancer
- Vincent DeMarco, American advocate for public health causes

== As a given name ==
- Demarco (musician), stage name of Collin Edwards, Jamaican reggae artist
- DeMarcco Hellams (born 2000), American football player
- DeMarco Johnson (born 1975), American basketball coach and former professional basketball player
- DeMarco Morgan, American journalist
- DeMarco Murray (born 1988), American football coach and former professional football player
- DeMarco Sampson (born 1985), American football coach and former professional football player
- DeMarco Hicks (born 1970), Retired Law Enforcement professional and entrepreneur

== Fictional characters ==
- John R. DeMarco, main character in Don Juan DeMarco, 1995 film starring Johnny Depp
- Galen DeMarco in the Judge Dredd universe
- Reese DeMarco, character in Kay Hooper's Special Crimes Unit novels

== See also ==
- DiMarco, variant form of Italian origin
