= De Marchi (clothing) =

Italian sportswear manufacturer

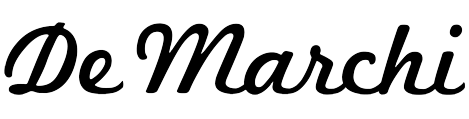
- Trade name: DE MARCHI SPORT Srl
- Industry: Sporting goods
- Founded: 1946; 80 years ago, San Vendemiano
- Founder: Emilio De Marchi
- Headquarters: San Vendemiano, Italy
- Area served: Worldwide
- Products: Cycling clothing

De Marchi is a premium Italian sportswear manufacturer and one of the oldest known cycling clothing brands. Its date of founding goes back to a few months after the end of World War II in 1946. Its founder, Emilio De Marchi (1906–1992) was an athlete and manager for Bottecchia, a major professional cycling team of his time named after the great Italian cyclist Ottavio Bottecchia.

De Marchi became instantly famous in the cycling world for the superior quality of the wool (Merino) used to produce cycling jerseys and cycling shorts. It was also among the first cycling clothing manufacturers to introduce circular knitting construction technique that allowed the creation of more comfortable jerseys, and buckskin leather (obtained from softer chamois leather), to make cycling short’s pads as opposed to sheep, that was more commonly used before.

More recently, in 1991, De Marchi has been the first brand to patent and sell a high-technology cycling pad. Made completely in microfiber fabric, anatomical heat-formed shaped, with air cooling silicone gel filling, "Soft-Gel" laid the basis for a more comfortable cycling ride to both professional and recreational athletes.

In 2000, De Marchi patented an innovative bikepad that acts as an elastic interface between the cyclist's body and the saddle which drastically reduced irritation and quickly became a standard in high quality cycling wear.

De Marchi has been uninterruptedly run by the same family since it was founded.

== See also ==
- Sportswear (activewear)
