= Louis Marchetti House =

Historic house in Wisconsin, United States

- U.S. National Register of Historic Places
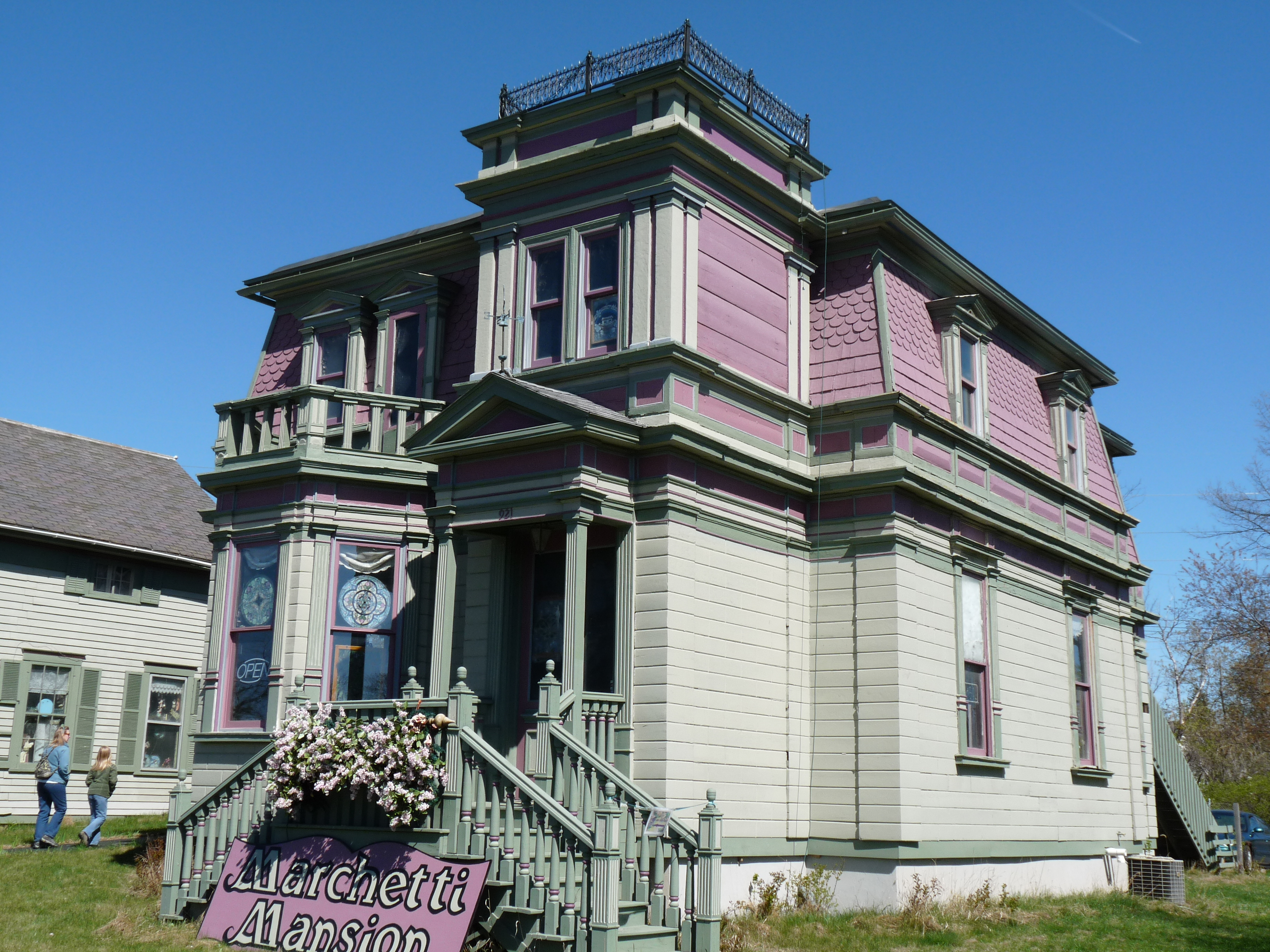
- Location: 921 Grand Ave. Wausau, Wisconsin
- Coordinates: 44.94872°N 89.62124°W
- Built: 1878
- Architect: John Dern
- Architectural style: Second Empire
- NRHP reference No.: 96000240
- Added to NRHP: March 7, 1996

The Louis Marchetti House is located in Wausau, Wisconsin, United States. It was added to the National Register of Historic Places in 1996.

== History ==
The house belonged to Louis Marchetti, a native of Vienna, Austria who moved to Wausau in 1867. Marchetti began working in sawmills and floating lumber down the Wisconsin, but soon mastered English and would become a prominent judge and Mayor of Wausau.
