= DiMarco =

Di Marco or DiMarco is a surname, originally meaning (son) of Marco.

Notable people with the surname include:

- Chris DiMarco, American golfer
- Damon DiMarco, American historian and biographer
- Federico Dimarco, Italian footballer
- Magali Di Marco Messmer, Swiss triathlete
- Melissa DiMarco, Canadian actress
- Nyle DiMarco, American model, actor, and deaf activist

== Fictional characters ==
- Johnny DiMarco, a character in Degrassi: The Next Generation
- Beppe di Marco, a character in EastEnders
- Gianni di Marco, a character in EastEnders
- Joe di Marco, a character in EastEnders
- Nicky di Marco, a character in EastEnders
- Rosa di Marco, a character in EastEnders
- Teresa di Marco, a character in EastEnders

== See also ==
- DeMarco
