= George Marcus =

George Marcus may refer to:

- George E. Marcus, American anthropologist
- George M. Marcus (born 1941), Greek-American real estate broker
- George Marcus, early pseudonym used by Wilt Chamberlain (1936–1999)

== See also ==
- Wilt Chamberlain (Born 1936), George Marcus being a fake name he used when playing for the NBL.
