= Carlo Demarchi =

Italian footballer (1890-1972)

Personal information
- Date of birth: 25 March 1890
- Place of birth: Turin, Italy
- Date of death: 5 October 1972 (aged 82)
- Position: Midfielder

Senior career*
Years	Team	Apps	(Gls)
1909–1922	Torino	57	(0)

International career
1912	Italy	1	(0)
- * Club domestic league appearances and goals

Carlo Demarchi (Italian pronunciation: [ˈkarlo de ˈmarki]; 25 March 1890 – 5 October 1972) was an Italian footballer who played as a midfielder. He competed for Italy in the men's football tournament at the 1912 Summer Olympics.
