= Andrea De Marchi =

Andrea De Marchi may refer to:

- Andrea De Marchi (rugby union, born 1988)
- Andrea De Marchi (rugby union, born 1992)
