= Jacques Marcovitch =

Jacques Marcovitch (born 1947) is a Brazilian Emeritus Professor at the Business Administration, Economy and Accountancy Faculty and Senior Professor of Strategy and International Affairs at the International Relations Institute at the University of São Paulo (USP) in Brazil. He served as Reitor (Rector or Dean) of that University in the 1997–2001 term. His research is concentrated in five areas. Business strategy on innovation, energy, forest and an environment, university governance, business pioneering and economic history of Brazil and international affairs. Marcovitch is also member of the Board of Guita e José Mindlin Brasiliana Library in São Paulo and the Foundation Board in the Graduate Institute of International and Development Studies (IHEID) in Geneva, Switzerland

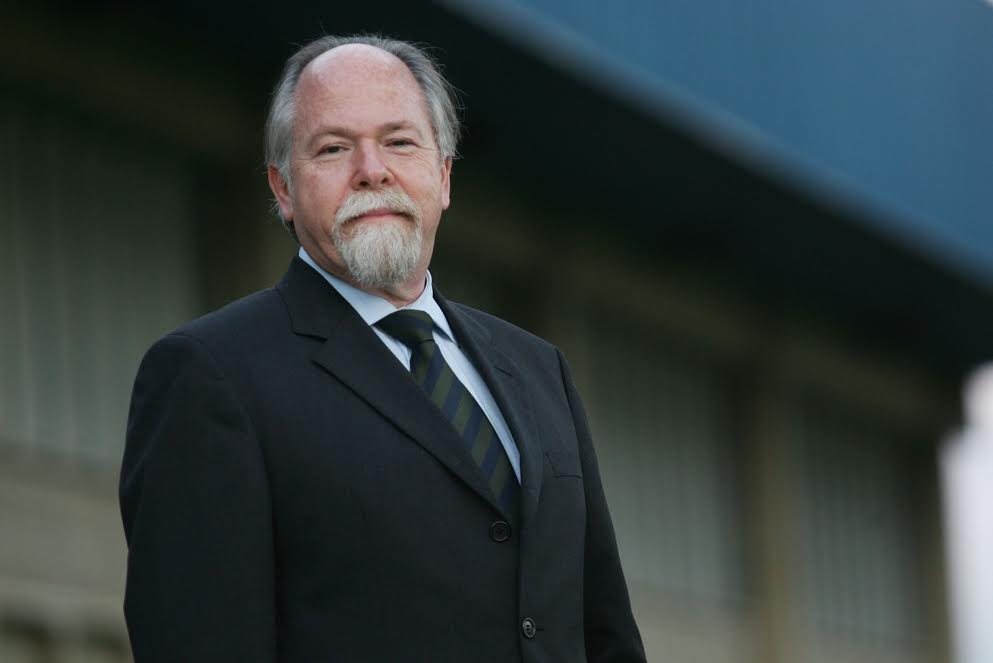
Jacques Marcovitch. Divulgação

== Early life and education ==
Marcovitch received his bachelor's degree in 1968; that same year he held office as the president of the Academic Center Visconde de Cairu. He graduated with a degree in business management at the Owen Graduate School of Management, Vanderbilt University and a PhD on Strategy for Innovation at the University of São Paulo in the 1973.

== Career ==
Marcovitch served as the president for the São Paulo State Energy Companies in 1986–87. He was Rector of the University of São Paulo from 1997 to 2001. He also served as director of the Institute for Advanced Studies from 1988 to 1993 developing projects about reforestation and intersectoral cooperation on carbon emission mitigation programmes. He was a Senior Adviser at the World Economic Forum.

He is author and editor of several books, including Economic Growth and Income Distribution in Brazil: Priorities for Change in 2007; this book was awarded The 2008 Brazil's Jabuti Prize for Best Book in Economics and Business. He also wrote GHG Emissions Reduction and Management in the Amazon in 2011.

== Research Fields ==
He has published over a dozen books and countless articles and essays that have impacted on the academic world and beyond.

His academic research is based on his experiences of management both inside and outside the university. His research interests can be highlighted in five main areas:

=== Strategy and innovation ===
In 1974 he completed his thesis on Organisational Effectiveness, and formed the first Programme of Science and Technology Management (PACTo) with a number of his peers in an agreement established with Vanderbilt University.

He is one of the founders and the first president of ALTEC – the Latin-Iberoamerican Association of Technology Management, a non-governmental not-for-profit that brings together professionals and institutions active in the conceptualization and practices of the management of technological innovation, seeking to encourage regional cooperation.

In 1985 he joined the Science and Technology Policy Commission of the State of São Paulo, and in 1992 he coordinated the International Subprogramme (XVI) of Management of Research and Technological Development of the Iberoamerican Programme of Science and Technology for Development (CYTED-D).

In 2016, to mark the anniversary of 70 years of FEA/USP, he led the working group that conceived the “Rethinking Brazil” cycle, dedicated to the analysis of public and private governance, pensions, inequality and the future of work.

=== Energy, forestry and the environment ===
From 1986 to 1987, he led the Energy Company of São Paulo (CESP/CPFL/Eletropaulo/Comgas) in André Franco Montoro’s administration.

During the UN conference on climate and development in Hamburg in 1988, the climatologist Wilfred Bach challenged the members of the Brazilian delegation to launch a forestry recovery project on a never before seen scale. This challenge resulted in the interinstitutional, multidisciplinary project at USP’s Institute for Advanced Studies: the Floram Project.

Between 1988 and 1993, while director of the institute, fundamental issues of science and culture, were scrutinized by a diversity of areas of knowledge. Integrating academia and Brazilian society, its programs included initiatives related to the economic transition and labor relations, education for citizenship as well as environment and development. Addressing national and global challenges of relevance, public policy proposals essential to the country were published in Revista de Estudos Avançados.

In 1992, he participated in the coordinating commission of USP for the United Nations conference on Development and the Environment, ECO-92.

In 2008 he coordinated the project “The Climate Change Economy” at the National Institute of Science and Technology for Climate Change (CNPq/Fapesp/Capes).

=== University Governance ===
As an example of commitment to improving university administration, his time as rector of the University of São Paulo produced three important reflections as a historical record on themes of university governance;

A Universidade (Im)possível (Futura-Siciliano), internationally edited in Spanish by Cambridge University Press.

"A USP e seus desafios" (EDUSP) in 2001, published in two volumes, organised by Marília Junqueira Caldas, reproduces his texts and others from the University Policy Forum. Another volume was also published that year: “Universidade Viva - Diário de um Reitor”.

Defining features of his leadership are the drafting and adoption of USP Code of Ethics, the creation of the Institute of International Relations and the establishment of a financial reserve to contribute to the resilience of the institution.

In the period 2018/2019, he was coordinator of the research project “Performance Indicators at the São Paulo State Universities” bringing research intensive universities together. The results of the FAPESP-supported work were two volumes of “Repensar a Universidade”; Desempenho Acadêmico e Comparações internacionais and Impactos para a Sociedade”.

In June 2020 he coordinated the III Fórum “The crises of 2020 and the new era emerging”, a space for dialogue and collaboration focused on New Scientific Leadership to articulate proposals for the universities confronting the social, economic and environmental impact of the COVID-19 pandemic.

=== Pioneering Entrepreneurship ===
In 2001, he conceived the "Pioneers and Entrepreneurs: The Saga of Development in Brazil" project. The project brings contextual analyses and the life and professional stories of twenty-four figures and business groups who marked the economic history of Brazil. Between 2003 and 2007 three volumes that compose the collection were published, edited by EDUSP/Saraiva.

An itinerant exhibition was conceived by Maria Cristina Oliveira Bruno based on the contents, and a reflection on the process of translation to a museum was published “Os caminhos e processos da musealização”.

In 2019 he was the curator of the exhibition “Pioneers and Entrepreneurs in São Paulo” at the Palácio dos Campos Eliseos. The exhibition highlighted the trajectories of pioneering entrepreneurs of the 19th and 20th centuries, giving decisive contributions for the growth and modernisation of the Brazilian economy.

=== International Relations ===
Between 1988 and 1993 he coordinated the Group of Analysis of International Affairs at USP made up of Celso Lafer, Gilberto Dupas, Lenina Pomeranz, Geraldo Forbes, Tullo Vigevani. In 1990 he participated in the drafting of guidelines for international cooperation policies at USP (CCInt – International Cooperation Council).

During his tenure as the Rector of the University of São Paulo, between 1997 and 2001, he led the structuring and creation of the Institute of International Relations, where he is currently a Senior Professor.

At the moment of the death of the Brazilian Sérgio Vieira de Mello, in a bombing at the UN headquarters in Baghdad in 2003, Marcovitch organised a series of essays with scholars and specialists. The result of this initiative was the publication of the book “Sérgio Vieira de Mello - Pensamento e Memória” (Edusp/ Saraiva), bringing together some of his articles and most relevant interviews translated into Portuguese and original contributions from intellectuals and diplomats about the thoughts of the man who reached the post of the High Commission on Human Rights at the United Nations.

== Awards ==
Marcovitch was presented with an honorary doctorate at Université Lumiere, Lyon. He was awarded the titles of Chevalier de la Légion d'honneur, France, Officier de l'Ordre des Palmes Académiques, France, and the Medal of Scientific Merit, Brazil.
