= Marchi =

Marchi is an Italian surname. According to one source, Marchi is a Spanish cognate of the English Mark, as derived from St. Mark the Evangelist.

Notable people with this surname include:

- Alessandro Marchi, Italian footballer
- Amedeo Marchi (1889 – ??), Italian gymnast
- Angelo Marchi (born 1950), retired Italian professional football player
- Ettore Marchi, Italian footballer
- Giuseppe Marchi, Italian Jesuit archaeologist
- Guido Marchi (born 1986), Italian professional footballer
- Guilherme Marchi, retired Brazilian professional bull rider
- Jamie Marchi, American actress, voice actress, ADR Director
- John J. Marchi (1921–2009), New York State senator
- John Peter Marchi (Serbo-Croatian: Ivan Petar Marki; 1663-1733), Venetian jurist, member of the Split nobility
- Leonardo Marchi (born 1996), Argentine professional footballer
- Luca Marchi (born 1988), Italian drag queen
- Luiz Felipe Ramos Marchi (born 1997), Brazilian footballer, defender for Italian club S.S. Lazio
- Mario Vellani Marchi (1895–1979), Italian painter and scenic designer
- Mattia Marchi, Italian footballer
- Paolo Marchi, Italian footballer
- Pio Marchi (1845–1942), Italian professional footballer
- Sergio Marchi (footballer), Italian footballer
- Sergio Marchi (politician), Canadian diplomat and former politician
- Tony Marchi, English footballer
- Brian Marchi, (1964-present), Realtor in Fenton, Mi

== See also ==
- MArchI, Moscow Architectural Institute
- De Marchi, similar surname
- Bothriechis marchi, venomenous viper
- Giacomo Marchi, pseudonym of Giorgio Bassani, Italian novelist and international intellectual
- Viaer Marchi, annual festival held in Guernsey on the first Monday of July
