= Alessandro Marchetti (footballer) =

Italian footballer (born 1988)

Personal information
- Date of birth: 13 May 1988 (age 38)
- Place of birth: Livorno, Italy
- Positions: Midfielder; defender

Team information
- Current team: Bra
- Number: 13

Youth career
- Livorno

Senior career*
Years	Team	Apps	(Gls)
2005–2006	Livorno	0	(0)
2006–2007	Casale Calcio	27	(0)
2007–2009	Carrarese Calcio	24	(0)
2009–2010	Legnano	28	(2)
2010	Carrarese Calcio	12	(0)
2011	Lucchese 1905	10	(1)
2012	Alessandria Calcio	16	(1)
2012–2013	Botev Vratsa	11	(1)
2013	Alashkert	4	(0)
2014–2015	Savona	34	(1)
2015–2016	Tuttocuoio	23	(0)
2016	Ponsacco	6	(1)
2017	Sanremese	14	(2)
2017	Forlì	15	(0)
2017–2019	Recanatese	53	(3)
2019–2021	Messina	49	(3)
2021	Giarre	7	(1)
2022–	Bra	4	(0)
- * Club domestic league appearances and goals as of 15 January 2022

Alessandro Marchetti (born 13 May 1988) is an Italian professional footballer who plays as a defender for Serie D club Bra.

== Career ==
Born in Livorno, Marchetti started his career with Livorno. His first and last involvement in the first team was after being named on the bench for Livorno's game against Palermo on 26 April 2006, which finished 3–1 in favour of Livorno. During the next 2006–07 season, he made his senior debut with Casale Calcio in Serie D.

In 2007 Marchetti joined Carrarese Calcio. For two seasons, he earned 24 appearances in the fourth division. In 2009 Marchetti signed for Legnano. On 15 November 2009, he scored his first goal in his career, in a 1–1 draw against Crociati Noceto. At the end of the 2009–10 season, Alessandro returned to Carrarese Calcio.

In January 2011, Marchetti joined Lucchese 1905. On 6 February, he made his Lucchese and third division debut in a 4–2 away win over Cosenza Calcio. Marchetti netted Lucchese's only goal in a 2–1 defeat at Benevento Calcio on 27 March.

In August 2012, Marchetti joined Bulgarian side Botev Vratsa. He made his league debut in a 1–0 away win over Minyor Pernik on 30 September, coming on as a substitute. On 22 May 2013, Marchetti scored his first goal in the Bulgarian A Group against Montana.
