= Alessandro Marchetti (mathematician) =

Italian mathematician (1633–1714)

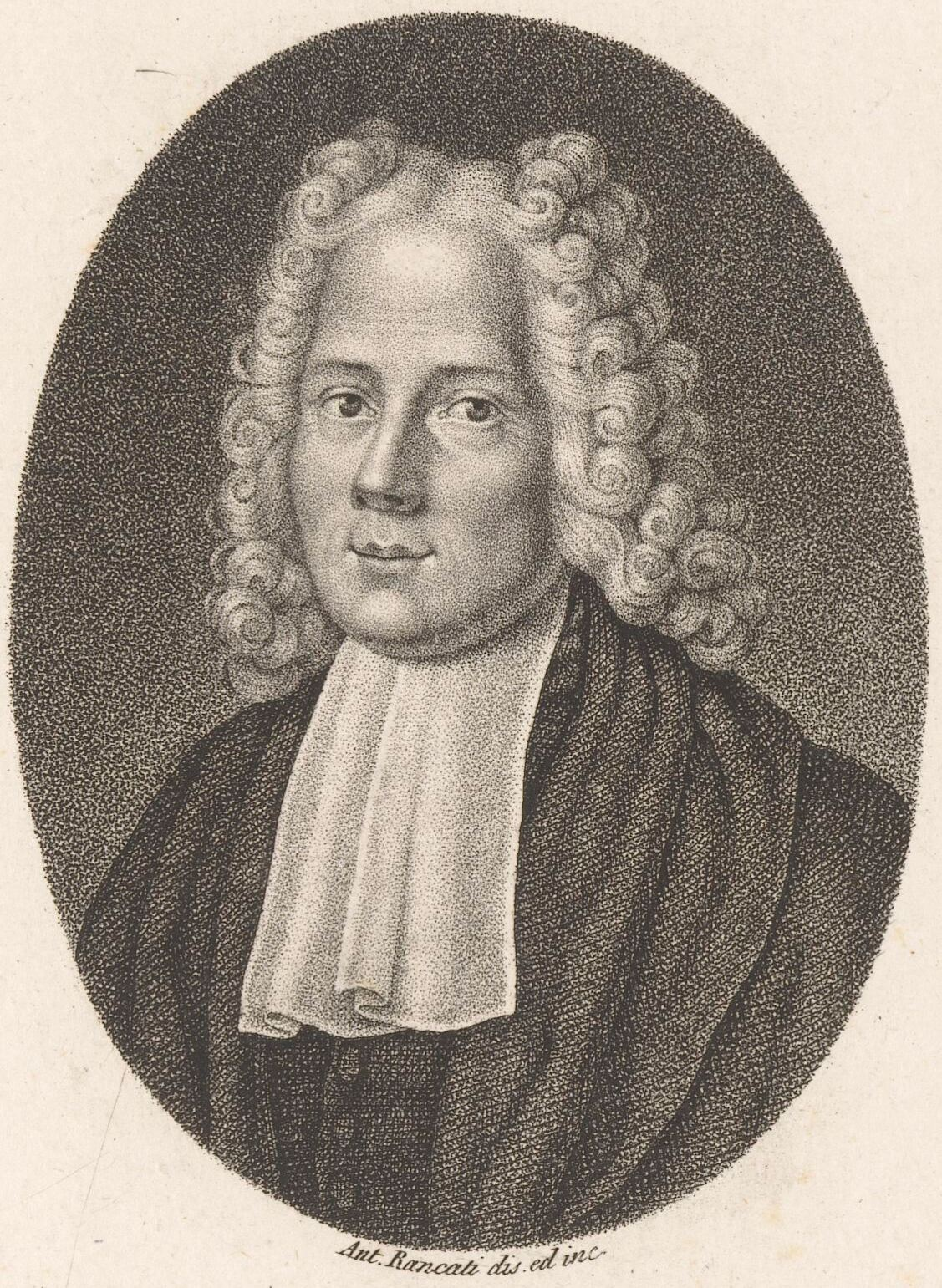
- Born: 17 March 1633; Pontormo, Empoli, Italy
- Died: 6 September 1714 (aged 81); Pontormo, Empoli, Italy
- Education: University of Florence; University of Pisa
- Occupation: Mathematician
- Employer: University of Pisa
- Spouse: Lucrezia de' Cancellieri (m. 1672)
- Children: Angelo Marchetti
- Scientific career
- Fields: Mathematics
- Academic advisors: Giovanni Alfonso Borelli
- Notable students: Giuseppe Del Papa

Signature
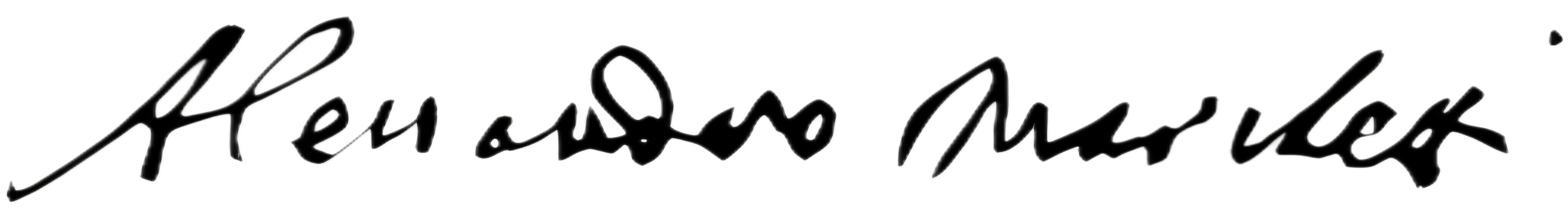

Alessandro Marchetti (17 March 1633 – 6 September 1714) was an Italian mathematician, noted for criticizing some conclusions of Guido Grandi, a student of Giovanni Alfonso Borelli who was influenced by Galileo and Aristotle. In 1668 Marchetti completed the first known Italian vernacular translation of Lucretius' Epicurean epic poem De rerum natura. He was denied permission to publish his translation, entitled Della natura delle cose, but it circulated widely in manuscript form before its first printing in 1717.

== Biography ==
=== Early life and education ===
Alessandro Marchetti was born in Pontormo, near Empoli, on 17 March 1633, the son of Angelo Marchetti and Luisa Buonaventuri. The third of five children, he lost both his parents as a teenager and was taken to Florence by his older brother, Antonio. Marchetti studied law at the University of Florence. In the Tuscan capital he met Prince Leopoldo de' Medici, who was impressed by his intelligence and helped him enrol at the University of Pisa, where he attended Giovanni Alfonso Borelli's public lectures on mathematics. Borelli introduced Marchetti to Galileo's experimental method and to several leading scientists, including Lorenzo Magalotti and Marcello Malpighi.

Marchetti graduated with a degree in Philosophy in 1659. The following year, he was appointed as a lecturer of natural philosophy, a position he held until 1677. His lectures focused on Pre-Socratic philosophy, Galilean science and Cartesianism. An opponent of Aristotelianism, Marchetti leaned toward the atomic theory of Democritus, and was influenced by the ideas of the French philosopher Pierre Gassendi, who sought to reconcile mechanistic atomism with the Christian faith. Between 1664 and 1668, Marchetti completed the first Italian translation of Lucretius's Epicurean poem De Rerum Natura. Recognised for its philosophical and scientific content as well as its poetic value, the poem is considered one of the finest examples of Italian late-Baroque poetry, and was praised by Nobel Prize laureate Giosuè Carducci. Opposed by conservative Catholic circles, the work was only published posthumously in 1717 in London by Paolo Rolli. Following Marchetti's death, the translation was placed on the Index Librorum Prohibitorum.

=== Scientific work ===
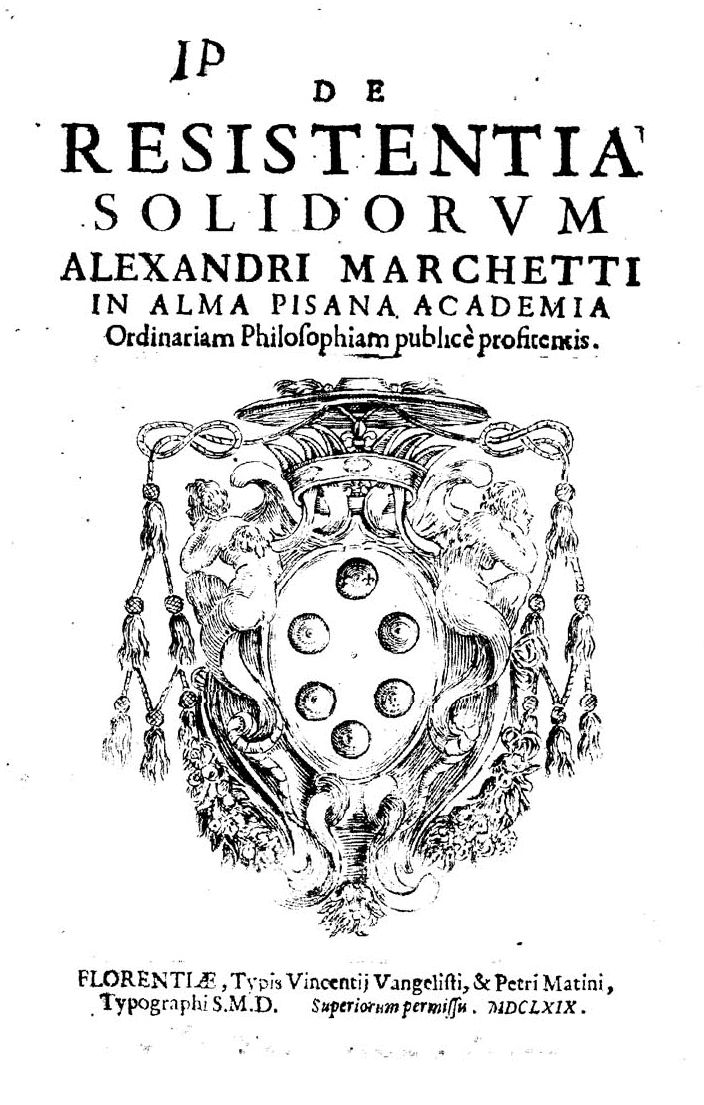
De resistentia solidorum, 1669

It was probably the disappointment resulting from the difficulties encountered in publishing the poem that led Marchetti to abandon his public commitment to atomism and turn to purely scientific research. In 1669, he published two scientific treatises: Exercitationes mechanicae and De resistentia solidorum, the latter of which is considered his masterpiece. Part of the broader debate that began following the publication of Galileo's Two New Sciences (Leiden, 1638), the essay discusses Galileo's law of free fall and attempts to provide the first coherent system for Galilean statics.

In 1672, Marchetti married Lucrezia de' Cancellieri. They had two sons: Angelo, who later became a professor at the University of Pisa, and Francesco. In 1674, he published a new volume entitled Fundamenta universae scientiae de motu uniformiter accelerato, in which he positioned himself as the primary continuator of Galileo's and Torricelli's work in the field of the science of the motion of heavy bodies. In 1677, Marchetti was appointed to the Chair of Mathematics at the University of Pisa, a position he held until his death. During this period, Marchetti's interest in astronomy was revived by his closeness to his former student, Giuseppe Del Papa, who was a philosophy lecturer at the Studio. This interest materialised in the observations of the Great Comet of 1680, which the two made together and later published in their respective works. Del Papa included them in his Trattati vari (Florence, 1734) and Marchetti included them in his Della natura delle comete (Florence, 1684), which also collected data from observations of the comets of 1681 and 1682. In these essays, Marchetti addressed the topic of the nature of comets, adhering to Galileo's view and opposing Ptolemaic-Aristotelian cosmology. In December 1661, he held a disputation on the subject at the University Pisa against Alessandro Marsili, alecturer in natural philosophy. Due to the renewed vigour of the debate on the nature and motion of comets following the appearance of one between late 1664 and early 1665, Marchetti gave two lectures at the Accademia degli Apatisti in Florence in 1665, where he presented his observational data.

As early as 1665, Marchetti conceived the idea of using all the material he had collected to write a book about comets. However, he abandoned the project at that time. He resumed it around twenty years later, using new data collected with Del Papa and Sigismondo Bernotti. In his work, Marchetti provided a detailed comparison of his own data with that collected in Paris by Giovanni Domenico Cassini and in Avignon by Giovanni Carlo Galletti, and he opposed both Ptolemaic astronomy and Cartesian vortex theory.

=== Later life ===
From the second half of the 1690s onwards, Marchetti received honours and recognition. Prince Ignazio Cesare d'Este, Marquis of Montecchio, granted him a coat of arms and a personal diploma of nobility. The Accademia dei Disuniti in Pisa appointed him as their consul. On 30 September 1695, he became a member of the Pontifical Academy of Arcadia under the name Alterio Eleo. On 7 December 1699, he became a member of the Accademia dei Fisiocritici in Siena. Finally, he was accepted into the Accademia dei Risvegliati in Pistoia, the Accademia della Crusca and the Accademia Fiorentina. Between 1710 and 1714, Marchetti was involved in a scientific controversy with the Camaldolese monk Luigi Guido Grandi. Grandi was a lecturer in philosophy at the University of Pisa, as well as a renowned mathematician who was admired by both Leibniz and Newton for his attempts to reconcile Galileo's work with Newtonian physics and calculus. The dispute ended with Marchetti's death on 6 September 1714 in Pontormo, where he was buried in the parish church.

== Works ==
- Lettera nella quale si ricerca donde avvenga che alcune perette di vetro, rompendosi loro il gambo, tutte si stritolino (in Italian). Firenze: Vincenzo Vangelisti. 1667.
- Exercitationes mechanicae (in Latin). Pisa: Giovanni Ferretti. 1669.
- De resistentia solidorum (in Latin). Firenze: Vincenzo Vangelisti. 1669.
- Della natura delle comete (in Italian). Firenze: Carlo Zenobi. 1684.

== Literature ==
- Israel, Jonathan (2002). Radical Enlightenment. Oxford: Oxford University Press. ISBN 978-0-19-925456-9.
- Gordon, Cosmo (1969). A Bibliography of Lucretius. London: Rupert Hart-Davis.
- Badaloni, Nicola (1968). "Intorno alla Filosofia di Alessandro Marchetti". Belfagor. 23 (3): 282–316. JSTOR 26142604.
