= Angelo Marchetti =

Italian mathematician and cosmographer

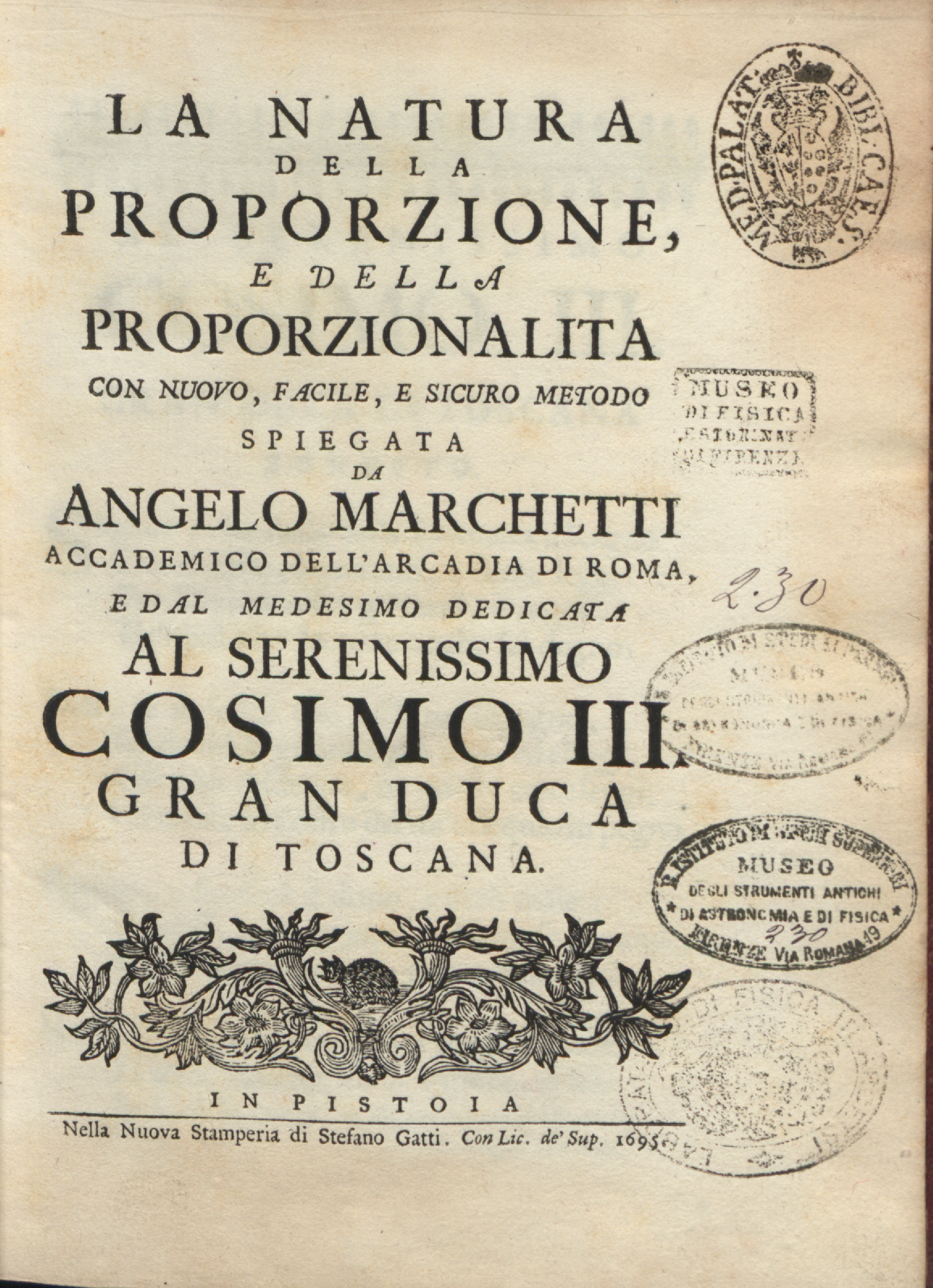
La natura della proporzione, 1695

Angelo Marchetti (1674 – 1753) was an Italian mathematician and cosmographer from Pistoia.

He was Alessandro Marchetti's son and a member of the Academy of Arcadia in Rome.

== Works ==
- Prove delle conclusioni intorno a' momenti de' gravi sopra i piani declivi. Florence: Garbo all'insegna della Stella. 1688.
- La natura della proporzione, e della proporzionalita con nuovo, facile, e sicuro metodo. Pistoia: Stefano Gatti. 1695.
- Breve introduzione alla cosmografia. Pistoia: Atto Bracali. 1738.
- Succinto trattato di navigazione. Pistoia: Atto Bracali. 1738.
