= Markovich =

Markovich is an East Slavic patronymic surname produced from the given name Mark using the Slavic patronymic suffix -ich, and means "son of Mark". It is also an Eastern Ashkenazi Jewish surname. Notable people with the surname include:

- Aaron Markovich of Wilna, court Jew of King Władysław IV Vasa of Poland in the 17th century
- Anastasiya Markovich (born 1979), Ukrainian painter
- Erez Markovich (born 1978), Israeli basketball player
- Mitch Markovich (born 1944), American percussionist and composer
- Yael Markovich, Israeli/American model and beauty pageant titleholder
- Yuliya Markovich (born 1989), Kazakhstani handball player

== See also ==
- Surnames derived from the name Mark
