= Marcus (name) =

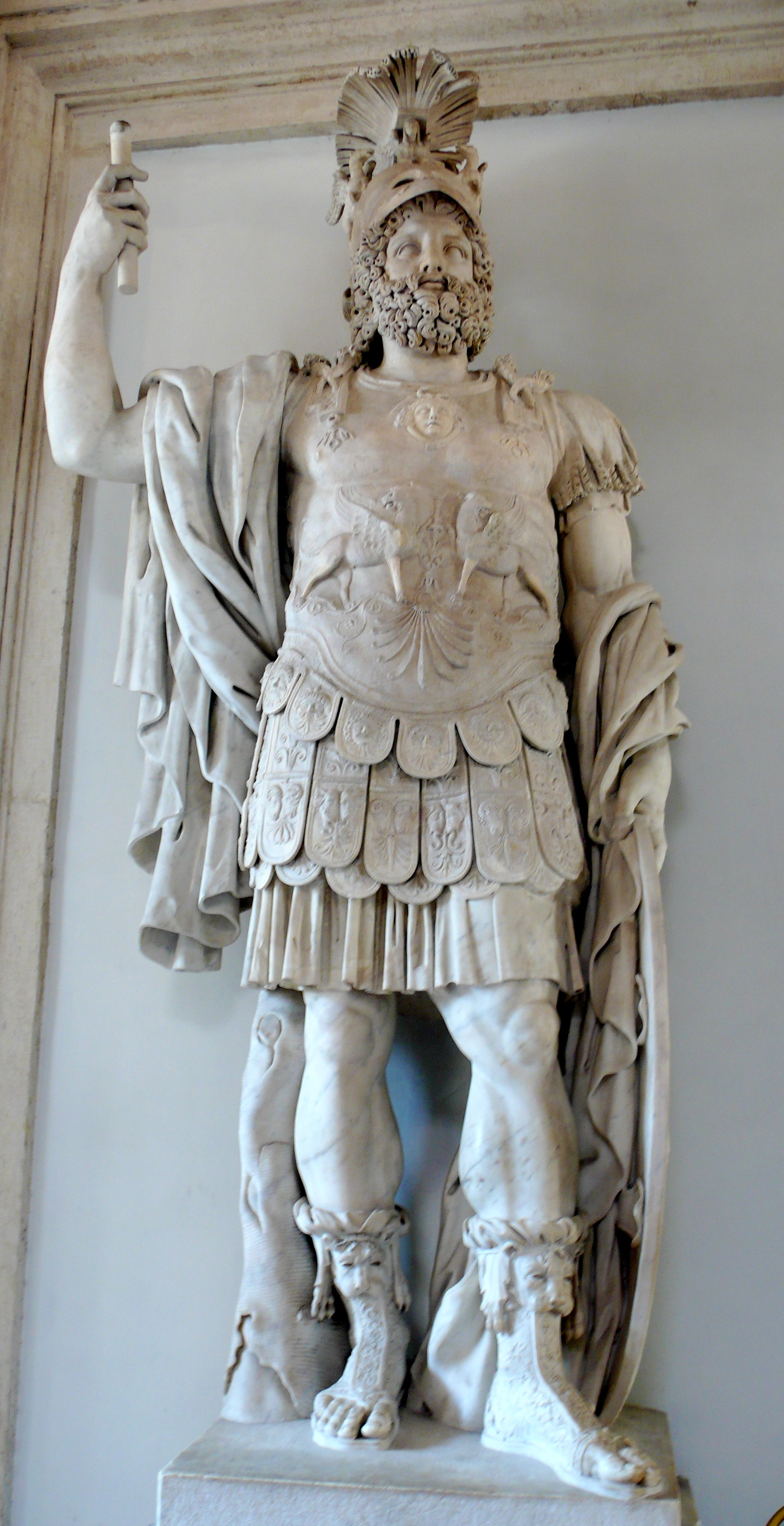
- Statue of Mars
- Pronunciation: English: /ˈmɑːrkəs/ German: [ˈmaʁkʊs] Norwegian: [ˈmɑ̀rkʉs] Swedish: [ˈmǎrːkɵs]
- Gender: Male

Origin
- Meaning: "dedicated to Mars"
- Region of origin: Ancient Rome

Other names
- Related names: Marcos; Markus; Markos; Marcas; Margus; Marcellus; Marquis

Marcus is a masculine given name of Ancient Roman pre-Christian origin derived either from Etruscan Marce of unknown meaning or referring to the god Mars. Mars was identified as the Roman god of war.

The name is popular in Europe, particularly in Sweden, Norway, Italy and Germany, and increasingly, in the Netherlands. It is also popular in English language countries, although less common than the shortened variation 'Mark', associated with the Gospel writer Mark the Evangelist. There are other variants. Marcus had ranked in the top 100 most popular boy names in Australia, Canada, England, Scotland, Sweden, and Wales since the 1990s, as well as the top 200 most popular boy names in the US since the 1960s.

Marcus developed as a patronymic or toponymic surname in Italy, southern France, and Spain around 1000 A.D., attributable to religious monasteries and sanctuaries named Sanctus Marcus (or its many variants). The surname was used as an identifier for the area of origin. The first historical record of the surname was in the year 1390 in Biberach an der Riß, Germany.

People with the name Marcus or its variants include:

== Given name ==
=== Arts and entertainment ===
In art and literature

- Marcus Gheeraerts the Elder, Flemish artist
- Marcus Gheeraerts the Younger, Flemish artist
- Marcus Harvey, British artist
- Marcus Jansen, American painter
- Markus Werner, Swiss writer

In television and film

- Markus Böttcher, German television actor
- Marcus Brigstocke, British comedian
- Marcus Cabais, Filipino actor
- Marcus Chang, Taiwanese actor and singer-songwriter
- Marcus Dillistone, British film director
- Marcus Carl Franklin, American actor
- Marcus Gilbert, British actor
- Marcus Toji, American actor

In music

- Marcus Adoro (born 1971), Philippine musician
- Marcus Cabais (born 2009), Filipino singer, dancer and member of Filipino global pop group Hori7on
- Marcus Collins (born 1988), finalist on The X Factor 2011
- Marcus Ramone Cooper, a former member of the Miami, Florida R&B group Pretty Ricky
- Markus Feehily, lead vocalist of Irish pop vocal band Westlife
- Marcus Gunnarsen, member of Norwegian pop duo Marcus & Martinus
- Markus Grosskopf, bass player for the German power metal band Helloween
- Marcus Hopson, rapper, hook singer, music video director, and hip hop producer
- Markus James, current bassist for the rock group Breaking Benjamin
- Markus Kaarlonen, Finnish musician, songwriter, and producer
- Markus Löffel, disc jockey, musician and producer from Frankfurt am Main, Germany
- Marcus Miller, American bassist and clarinetist
- Marcus Mumford, singer, songwriter for Mumford and Sons
- Marcus Paus, Norwegian composer
- Markus Schulz, German trance music DJ and producer who currently resides in Miami, Florida, USA
- Marcus Siepen (born 1968), German guitarist in Blind Guardian
- Markus Stockhausen, German trumpeter and composer
- Markus Stopholese, American rock guitarist
- Marcus Viana (born 1953), Brazilian musician and member of Sagrado Coração da Terra

In fictional characters

- Marcus, a vampire from the Twilight Saga
- Marcus (Ninjago), a character in Ninjago
- Marcus Brody, a fictional character from The Last Crusade
- Marcus Tullius Cicero (Rome character), a historical figure who features as a character in the HBO/BBC2 television series Rome
- Marcus Cole (Babylon 5), fictional character in Babylon 5
- Marcus Corvinus, the protagonist in David Wishart's historical detective novels. Also the name of a primary antagonist in the Underworld films
- Marcus Didius Falco, the protagonist in Lindsey Davis Ancient Rome historical mystery fictions
- Marcus Fenix, the primary protagonist from the Gears of War video game series
- Marcus Johnson, the alias of a Marvel Comics character and son of Nick Fury
- Marcus Welby, M.D., T.V. Doctor from the 1970s

=== Government ===
In Ancient Rome

- Marcus (son of Basiliscus), son and co-emperor of Basiliscus
- Marcus (usurper), emperor from Roman Britain in AD 406
- Marcus Aemilius Lepidus, member of the Second Triumvirate
- Marcus Antonius, commonly known in English as Mark Antony
- Marcus Aurelius, 16th Roman emperor from 161 to 180
- Marcus Junius Brutus, Roman patrician of the late Roman Republic
- Marcus Licinius Crassus, Roman general and politician who suppressed the slave revolt led by Spartacus
- Marcus Opellius Macrinus, Roman emperor from 217 to 218
- Marcus Porcius Cato, better known as Cato the Elder
- Marcus Porcius Cato Uticensis, better known as Cato the Younger
- Marcus Tullius Cicero, Roman statesman, lawyer, political theorist, and philosopher
- Marcus Ulpius Traianus, Roman emperor from 98 to 117
- Marcus Vipsanius Agrippa, Roman statesman and general

In politics

- Marcus Andersson (born 1987), Swedish politician
- Markus Buchart, Manitoba politician
- Markus Feldmann, Swiss politician
- Markus Ferber, German politician
- Marcus Fernando (1864–1936), Ceylonese politician
- Marcus Fridlund (born 1992), Swedish politician
- Markus Ganserer, German politician
- Marcus Garvey, Jamaican/African-American activist
- Markus Kallifatides (born 1972), Swedish politician
- Markus Kranig (born 1988), German politician
- Markus Pieper, German politician
- Marcus Reno, United States career military officer
- Markus Stein (born 1985), German politician
- Markus Striedl (born 1980), German politician
- Markus Vogl (born 1970), Austrian politician
- Marcus Willershausen (born 2000), Swedish politician

Security and intelligence

- Marcus (ASIO informant)

=== Sports ===
- Marcus Allbäck, Swedish footballer and coach
- Marcus Allen (disambiguation), multiple people
- Marcus Aurélio, (born 1973), Brazilian mixed martial artist
- Markus Babbel, German footballer and coach
- Markus Bailey (born 1997), American football player
- Marcus Baugh (born 1994), American football player
- Markus Beyer, German boxer
- Marcus Bingham Jr. (born 2000), American basketball player in the Israeli Basketball Premier League
- Marcus Camby, American basketball player
- Marcus Christopher (born 2002), American BMX rider
- Marcus Cor Von (born 1970), American wrestler, real name Monty Brown
- Marcus Vinicius de Morais, Brazilian footballer
- Marcus Davenport (born 1996), American football player
- Markus Dieckmann, German beach volleyball player
- Marcus Dove (born 1985), American basketball player
- Marcus Edwards (born 1998), English footballer
- Markus Egger, Swiss beach volleyball player
- Marcus Epps (disambiguation), multiple people
- Marcus Ericsson, Swedish Formula 1 driver
- Marcus Feagin (born 1991), American basketball player
- Marcus Foligno, Canadian-American ice hockey player
- Marcus Foster (born 1995), American basketball player for Hapoel Tel Aviv of the Israeli Basketball Premier League
- Marcus Gaither (1961–2020), American-French basketball player
- Markus Graf (born 1959), a Swiss ice hockey player, coach, and executive
- Marcus Green (disambiguation), multiple people
- Marcus Grönholm, Finnish rally driver
- Marcus Haber, Canadian soccer player
- Marcus Hatten, basketball player in Israel Basketball Premier League
- Markus Halsti, Finnish footballer
- Marcus Hardison, American football player
- Marcus Harper II (born 2002), American football player
- Markus Heikkinen (born 1978), Finnish footballer
- Marcus Henry (disambiguation), multiple people
- Marcus Hinton, American football player
- Marcus Horan, Ireland and Munster rugby player
- Markus Howard (born 1999), American basketball player
- Marcus Jensen, American baseball player and coach
- Marcus Johnson, American football offensive lineman
- Marcus Johnson, American football wide receiver
- Markus Keller (triathlete), Swiss triathlon athlete
- Marcus Keyes (born 1973), American gridiron football player
- Marcus Mailei, American gridiron football player
- Marcus Mariota, American gridiron football player
- Marcus Mattioli, Brazilian swimmer
- Markus Mattsson, Finnish ice hockey player
- Marcus Maye, American gridiron football player
- Marcus Mbow (born 2003), American football player
- Markus Merk, German football referee
- Marcus Mueller (born 2005), American luger
- Markus Näslund, Swedish ice hockey player
- Markus Neumayr, German footballer
- Markus Niemelä, Finnish racing driver
- Marcus Nilson, Swedish ice hockey player
- Marcus Norris (born 1974), American basketball player
- Markus Oscarsson, Swedish flatwater canoeist
- Markus Paatelainen, Finnish footballer
- Markus Paul (1966–2020), American football coach and player
- Markus Penz, Austrian male skeleton racer
- Marcus Peters (born 1993), American football player
- Markus Pröll, German footballer
- Marcus Rashford, English footballer
- Marcus Ratcliffe (born 2005), American football player
- Marcus Relphorde (born 1988), American basketball player in the Israeli National League
- Markus Rogan, Austrian swimmer
- Marcus Rose, English rugby player
- Marcus Rosemy-Jacksaint (born 2002), American college football player
- Markus Rosenberg, Swedish footballer
- Markus Rühl, German bodybuilder
- Marcus Sandell, Finnish alpine skier
- Marcus Santos-Silva (born 1997), American basketball and football player
- Marcus Semien (born 1990), American baseball player
- Marcus Simms (born 1997), American football player
- Marcus Skeet (born 2008), English runner who became the youngest person to run the length of the Great Britain in 2025
- Marcus Smart (born 1994), American basketball player
- Marcus Stoinis, Australian cricketer
- Marcus Stroman, American baseball player
- Marcus Thames, American baseball player and coach
- Marcus Thigpen, American gridiron football player
- Marcus Thuram, French footballer
- Marcus Trescothick, English cricketer
- Marcus Urban, German footballer
- Marcus Velado-Tsegaye, Canadian soccer player
- Markus Wasmeier, German alpine skier
- Marcus Wehr (born 2000), American football player
- Markus Weise, German field hockey player and coach
- Markus Weissenberger, Austrian footballer
- Marcus Wilson (disambiguation), multiple people
- Markus Winkelhock, German auto racing driver
- Marcus Williams (basketball, born 1985), American basketball player
- Marcus Williams (safety), American football player
- Marcus Yarns (born 2001), American football player

=== Other ===
- Marcus (informant), alias of a Palestinian refugee who worked for Australia's intelligence agency.
- Marcus (Manichean), missionary in Spain
- Marcus (Marcosian), founder of the Marcosians
- Marcus Gavius Apicius, Roman gourmet
- Marcus Benedict, alternative name of Mordecai Benet, chief rabbi of Moravia
- Markus Breitschmid, Swiss Architectural theoretician and author
- Markus J. Buehler, American materials scientist
- Marcus Butler, English YouTube vlogger
- Marcus du Sautoy, English mathematician
- Marcus Einfeld (born 1938), Australian former Superior Court Judge
- Marcus Goldman (1821–1904), German–American investment banker and Businessman
- Markus Hess, computer prodigy and hacker
- Markus Kuhn (computer scientist), German computer scientist
- Marcus Loew, American business magnate, founder of the Metro-Goldwyn-Mayer film studio
- Markus Meechan, Scottish YouTuber
- Markus Mosse, German physician
- Markus Persson, Swedish indie game developer
- Marcus Samuelsson, celebrity chef, restaurateur, and television personality
- Marcus Sarjeant, UK man who fired blanks at the Queen
- Marcus Schenkenberg, Swedish male supermodel
- Markus Selin (born 1978), Swedish politician
- Marcus Stuttard, British chief executive
- Marcus B. Toney (c. 1840–1929), American Confederate veteran, Klansman, Masonic leader and memoirist
- Markus Nissa Weiss, Hungarian advocate of reform
- Markus Wolf, former East German spymaster

== See also ==
- Marcus (surname)
- Marcus (praenomen)
- Marques (disambiguation)
- Mark (given name)
- Marcus Vinicius (disambiguation)
- DeMarcus, given name
- Jamarcus, given name
