= Margus (name) =

Male given name

- Gender: Male
- Language: Estonian
- Name day: 25 April

Origin
- Region of origin: Estonia

Margus is an Estonian masculine given name, a variant of Marcus.

People named Margus include:

- Margus Allikmaa (born 1961), theatre director, cultural figure and politician
- Margus Hanson (born 1958), politician
- Margus Hernits (born 1972), figure skater
- Margus Hunt (born 1987), shot putter, discus and hammer thrower
- Margus Kolga (born 1966), diplomat
- Margus Konnula (aka Contra; born 1974), poet and translator
- Margus Kuul (born 1979), military commander
- Margus Laidre (born 1959), historian and diplomat
- Margus Leivo (1954–2019), politician
- Margus Lepa (born 1953), radio journalist, comedian and actor
- Margus Lepik (born 1969), politician
- Margus Luik (born 1980), racewalker
- Margus Metstak (born 1961), basketball player
- Margus Oopkaup (1959–2025), actor
- Margus Pirksaar (born 1974), runner
- Margus Põldsepp (born 1969), musician (Lõõtsavägilased)
- Margus Prangel (born 1974), actor
- Margus Saar (born 1966), television journalist and producer
- Margus Tabor (born 1962), actor
- Margus Tammekivi (born 1956), lawyer, politician and sports figure
- Margus Tsahkna (born 1977), politician
