= William Belo =

Servant of Anne of Denmark (1579–1635)

- Born: 1579
- Died: 1635 (aged 55–56)
- Other names: Below, Belou
- Occupations: German-speaking servant of Anne of Denmark in Scotland and England

William Belo or Below or Belou (1579–1635) was a German-speaking servant of Anne of Denmark in Scotland and England.

== Background ==
Belo was a member of the aristocratic Mecklenburg Below family. He may have been a relation of the councilor and diplomat Henrik Below. As a ten-year-old he joined the household of Anne of Denmark in 1589. He was probably a page boy.

== At the Scottish court ==
Belo was given expensive clothes to wear as a child and teenager at the Scottish court, and may have been of small stature. The accounts of Thomas Foulis mention that the "littil Duchman" at court was given a New Year's Day gift of a diamond ring in 1596 worth 50 French crowns.

There was another servant from Mecklenburg in Anne's household, Jacob, who was a lackey attending the queen's horse. Hennink Mildenitz was another young male servant, who returned to the Danish court in 1602 after serving the queen since 1589. Mildenitz may have been the "Brunswick" lackey mentioned in the queen's clothing accounts.

In July 1592 Belo was dressed in green and orange, colours worn by Marie Stewart, Margaret Vinstarr, and the queen herself. The account of Robert Jousie records other garments in violet, red, purple, yellow, black, brown, and columbine.

== In England ==
Belo came to England with the court at the Union of the Crowns and in November 1604 was granted an income £100 yearly. These pensions were not always paid. In 1605, he was described as "William Bellon a Dutch gent and her majesty's servant".

After the queen's death in 1619, Belo lost his income. He joined the service of Anne of Denmark's brother, Ulrik, Duke of Holstein, and was employed by the Duke in England. In 1622 Christian IV of Denmark wrote to Prince Charles asking for his help to get Belo's pension of £150 paid, mentioning Belo's 30 years of service to his mother. Christian IV wrote again in 1624 to King James announcing the death of Anne of Denmark's brother, Ulrik, Duke of Holstein and requesting he pay Belo his pension.

Belo petitioned for payment and claimed that he had been poorly rewarded for his 37 years service and paid less than Tom Durie, who was "a natural fool", or Archie Armstrong, "a counterfeit". He said the King of Denmark put him with Anna of Denmark when he was ten years old. In a later petition he explains that King James gave him a reward that was owed to Ulrik, Duke of Holstein and he had to go to Denmark to see Christian IV to pursue it, to collect this debt, and then he served the king of Denmark for a while, meanwhile when Mecklenburg was invaded he lost his property there.

According to his petition of 1626, he had a wife and daughter, who he had left in a country house within the reach of Wallenstein's army.

== In fiction ==
Edward Peyton, a 17th-century satirical writer, mentions "Mr Beely", as a Danish favourite of Anne of Denmark in his Catastrophe of the House of Stuart. Peyton claimed to have had a familiarity with him, working to collect money for him from a grant of confiscated goods. Beely told Peyton in secret that he was the real father of King Charles I.
