= Margum =

Margum may refer to the following ancient Roman places and jurisdictions in the Balkans:

- Margum Dubravica, a fortress and garrison in Roman province Moesia Superior, now at Orašje hamlet in Dubravica, Serbia, at the mouth of the Great Morava on the Danube
- Contra Margum, Roman fortress on the opposite bank of the Danube near Kovin

== See also ==
- Margus (disambiguation)
- List of Catholic dioceses in Bosnia and Herzegovina
- List of Catholic titular sees
