= Margus =

Margus may refer to:

- Margus (name), Estonian given name
- Margus (city), a former Roman city at the locality of modern Požarevac, Serbia
- Margus River, the Roman name of Great Morava; see Battle of the Margus
