= Denis Alt =

German politician (born 1980)

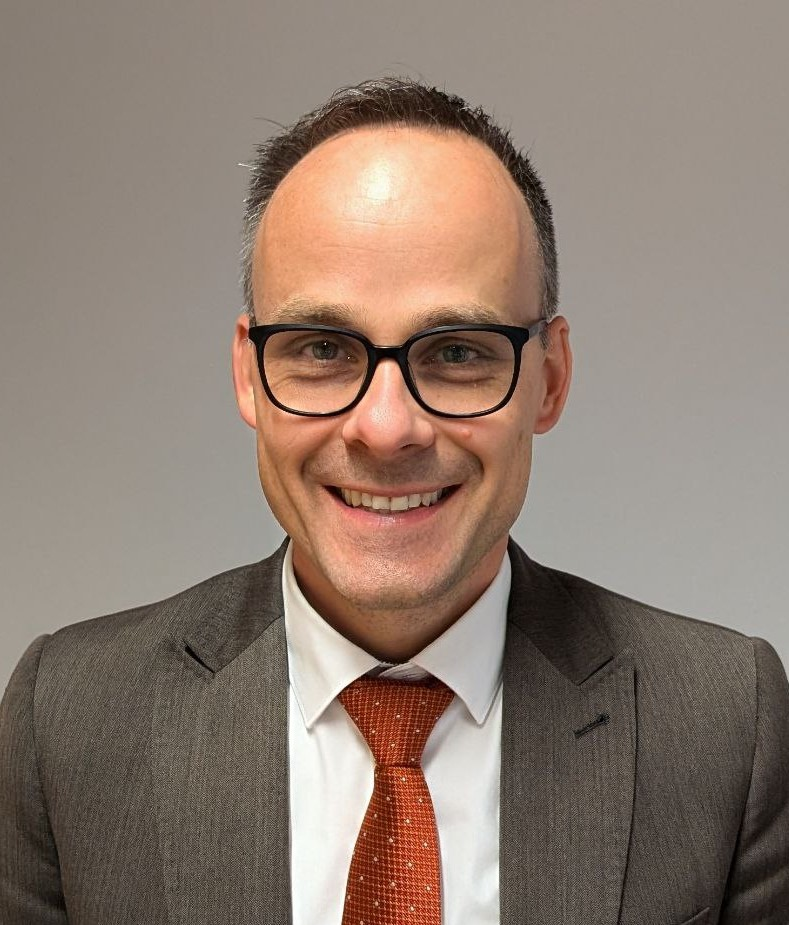
- Alt in 2024

Member of the Landtag of Rhineland-Palatinate
- In office 1 July 2014 – 1 March 2019
- Preceded by: Peter Wilhelm Dröscher
- Succeeded by: Markus Stein
- Constituency: Kirn/Bad Sobernheim

Personal details
- Born: 21 October 1980 (age 46)
- Party: Social Democratic Party (since 1998)

Denis Alt (born 21 October 1980) is a German politician serving as state secretary of construction, housing, municipalities and culture of Rhineland-Palatinate since 2026. From 2024 to 2026, he served as state secretary of labour, social affairs, transformation and digitalization. From 2021 to 2024, he served as state secretary of science and health. From 2019 to 2021, he served as state secretary of science, continuing education and culture. From 2014 to 2019, he was a member of the Landtag of Rhineland-Palatinate.
