= Untsakad =

Estonian folk music group

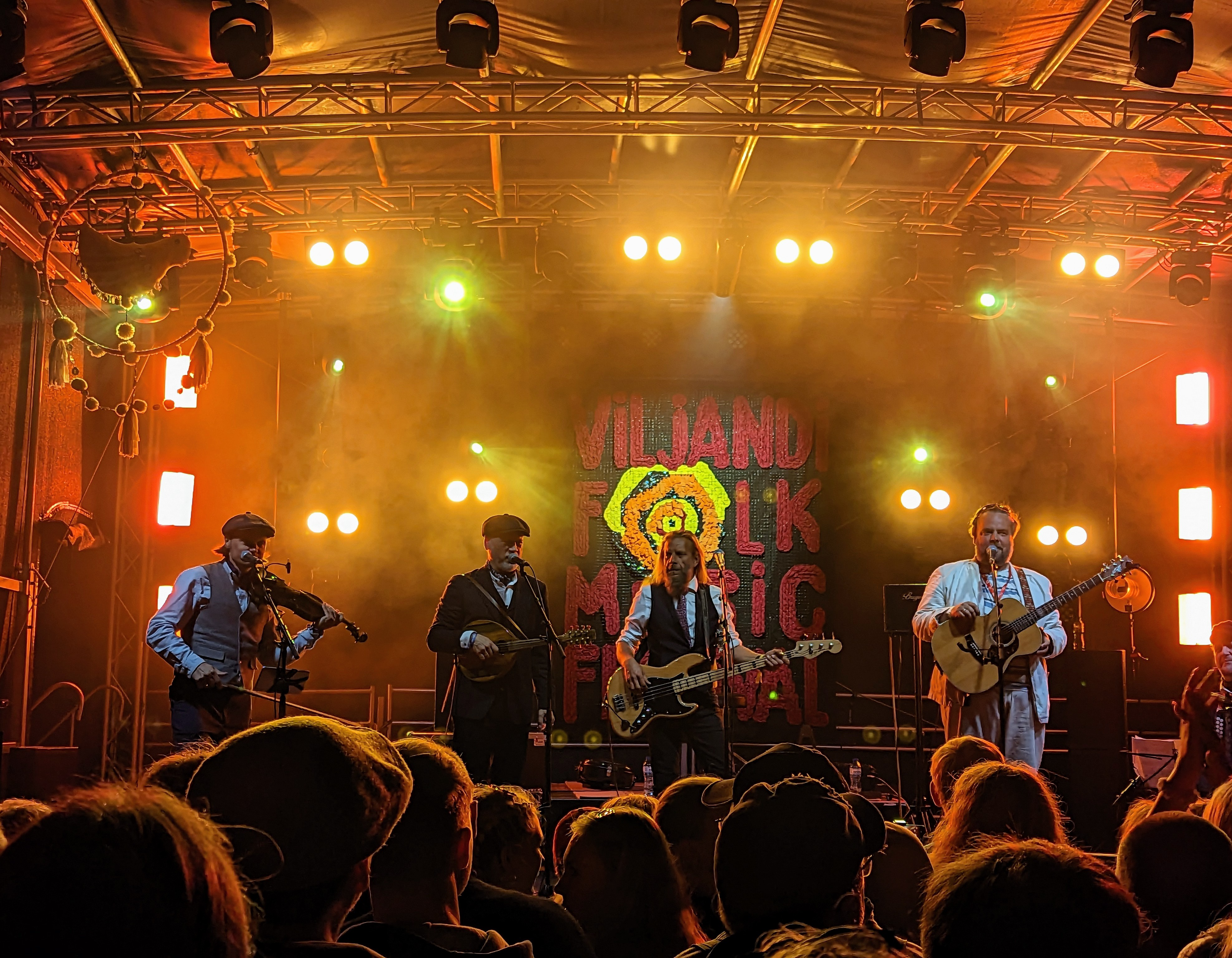
- Untsakad performing at the Viljandi Folk Music Festival

Background information
- Origin: Viljandi, Estonia
- Genres: Folk music
- Years active: 1992-present
- Website: untsakad.ee

Untsakad is an Estonian folk music ensemble formed in 1992 in Viljandi, Estonia.

In 1992, the music ensemble was formed under the name Rahvastepall, but was changed to Untsakad in 1993. The ensembles' mission was for the collection and preservation of Estonian folk music.

Most of the ensemble's discography consists of Estonian songs originating from World War I, the Estonian War of Independence, Interwar period, World War II, the Forest Brothers, Soviet Occupation, sailors, and in general Estonian folk songs.

== Members ==
- Jaanus Jantson - acoustic guitar, vocals
- Ilmar Kald - violin
- Jaanus Põlder - mandolin, vocals
- Margus Põldsepp - melodeon
- Marek Rätsep - bass guitar, vocals
- Tauno Uibo - sound director

== Discography ==
=== Albums ===
As of 2026, Untsakad has published 12 albums.

- Karmi elu sunnil (1994)
- Nuur ma olli, ull ma olli... (1995)
- Päälinna laiv Von Krahlis (1996)
- Nižni Novgorod (1997)
- Metsa läksid sa (1998)
- Tütarlaps merimeeste kõrtsist (2000)
- Untsakad 10 (2002)
- Palju Õnne Sünnipäevaks (2004)
- Metsa läksid sa 2 (2006)
- Meie küla pidu (2011)
- Nõiduvad huuled (2025)
- Metsa läksid sa 3 (2026)
