= Tom Durie =

Scottish fool or entertainer to Anne of Denmark

Tom Durie, Duri, Dury or Derry (fl. 1600–1634) was a Scottish fool or entertainer to Anne of Denmark.

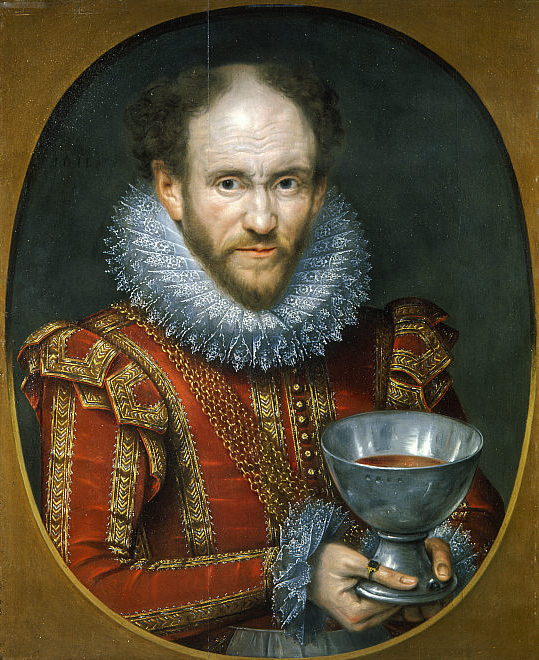
Tom Durie, Anne of Denmark's fool, 1614, oil on panel, National Galleries of Scotland

== Career ==
Tom Durie appears on record at the Scottish court in May 1603, when he was bought clothes to accompany Anne of Denmark on her journey to England after the Union of the Crowns. They included green cloth "to be ane coit to Thomas Durie hir Majesteis fule".

In 1604, his maintenance was paid to John Gibb. Durie seems to be mentioned in a letter of the queen's secretary William Fowler written on 3 October 1604, "Thom. Ducie [sic] is in missing, and no newes of his wandring". His absence from court and return, if it was he, was not mentioned again.

In August 1607, King James was amused by a letter from Sir Robert Cecil about the promotion of a courtier to a position in the household of Anne of Denmark. King James asked the Earl of Dunbar to reply, and he wrote that Cecil was "so good a fool" and need only fear the jealousy of "Thom. Durey".

The queen had his portrait painted in 1614 by Marcus Gheeraerts the Younger, and again by Paul van Somer, recorded in an inventory as the picture of "Tome Derey at Length". Gheeraerts's painting is displayed at the National Gallery of Scotland. At Denmark House in London his portrait was displayed in an antechamber or passage between the queen's withdrawing room and the gallery and was recorded in an inventory as the picture of "Thomas Derry" in 1619.

The space at Somerset House was painted in the reign of Charles I and the accounts record the "colouring of Tom Derry's gallery". An inventory of paintings at Somerset House made in 1649 attributes a painting in the gallery of "Tom Derry" to Paul van Somer.

Anne of Denmark also displayed his portrait in the north gallery at Oatlands. The Oatlands portrait was sent for reframing and was recorded as missing. In the 1630s the Gheeraerts painting was in the Queen's Gallery at Greenwich, with portraits of Anne's Danish relatives.

The meaning of the large silver cup shown in the picture is unknown. Allison Steenson has drawn attention to a short note written by Anne of Denmark' secretary, William Fowler, "for Tho Duryes portrait". This includes the Latin line "Odi memorem comptorem", I hate a drinking companion with a good memory".

Durie was given mourning clothes on the death of Prince Henry in 1612. Another fool at court, Archibald Armstrong, wore a crimson velvet coat with gold lace at the wedding of Princess Elizabeth and Frederick V of the Palatinate in 1613. The costume may have been like that in the portrait of Tom Durie.

Weekly expenses for "Thomas Derry her majesty's jester" and "John Mawe, his man" in 1612 were 7 shillings. A list of the horses of royal servants made in 1618 includes horses for Archie, Thom. Derry, and John Mawre, his keeper. In June 1619, a horse described as a "grey nag" was bought for Tom Durie, costing £12. He was now the king's fool.

Tom Durie was still alive in 1620 when an account mentions a payment of 9s-6d weekly for his food and lodging. Some receipts for his and Archy Armstrong's costumes are kept with the papers of Lionel Cranfield at Kent History and Library Centre. The final payment to John Maure for Tom Dury's maintenance and lodging was made in June 1634.

In 1623 a Roman Catholic, Thomas Rant, recorded a story about Anne of Denmark and a fool, probably meaning Tom Durie, at Dunfermline Palace in 1600, which he had heard from a Mr Gray. The queen was pregnant (with Prince Charles) and asked to hear the Mass at night. Her fool observed the ceremony and described it to James VI as a midnight feast. The king was jealous about this but was satisfied when he heard it was the Mass. The point of the story for Thomas Rant was to show King James' indifference to his wife's religion, who was frequently claimed to be sympathetic to Roman Catholicism.

== Attitudes to Tom Durie in court correspondence ==
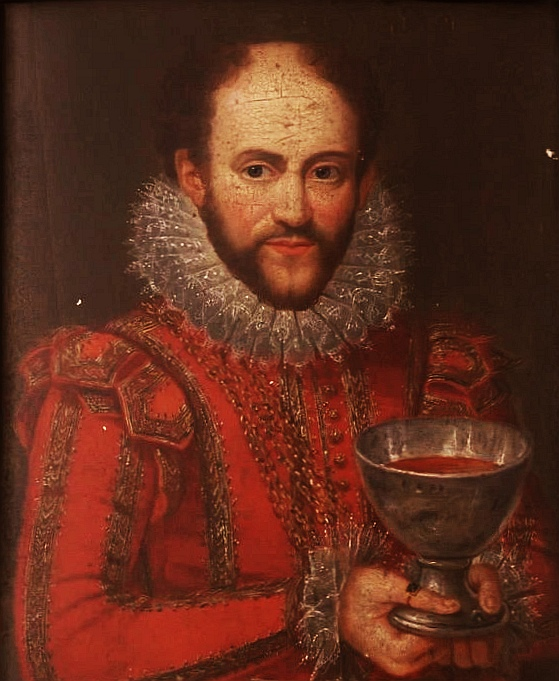
Portrait of Tom Durie known as "David Murray, 1st Viscount of Stormont as the King's cup-bearer" at Scone Palace

King James used to call Robert Cecil, 1st Earl of Salisbury "my little beagle" or "young Tom Durie". The Earl of Worcester reported to Robert Cecil that King James was pleased and merry at his letters concerning Perkin Warbeck and Tom Durie.

Robert Cecil once wrote a letter of apology to Adam Newton for a breach of manners, saying that "had I done so because I knew it not to be my duty, then am I worse than Tom Dyrry", suggesting that Durie did not adhere to court etiquette. He compared himself to Tom Durie in another humorous letter to Newton, writing that if a supplicant failed to gain a place in Prince Henry's household, the man should be sent to "Tom Dyrry or to me". Robert Cecil was short in height and courtiers made jokes about his stature.

In 1607 there was competition for an office in the Queen's household, which caused some amusement at court, and the Scottish courtier George Home, 1st Earl of Dunbar reported to Robert Cecil a joke of the King's, that "Thom. Durey" might be jealous that a noble and his son were striving for his place.

After the death of Anne of Denmark, one of her longserving Danish or German courtiers, William Belo, complained that he had been poorly rewarded for his service and paid less than Tom Durie, who was "a natural fool", or Archie Armstrong, "a counterfeit". Belo had been given expensive clothes to wear as a young man or teenager at the Scottish court, and may have been of small stature. The subsidy accounts mention that a "littil Duchman" at the Scottish court was given a diamond ring.
