= Markus Stein =

German politician (born 1985)

- Stein in 2025

Member of the Landtag of Rhineland-Palatinate
- Incumbent
- Assumed office 1 March 2019
- Preceded by: Denis Alt
- Constituency: Kirn/Bad Sobernheim

Personal details
- Born: 8 June 1985 (age 41)
- Party: Social Democratic Party (since 2002)

Markus Stein (born 8 June 1985) is a German politician serving as a member of the Landtag of Rhineland-Palatinate since 2019. He has served as chairman of the Social Democratic Party in Rüdesheim since 2019.
