= Lõõtsavägilased =

Estonian musical group

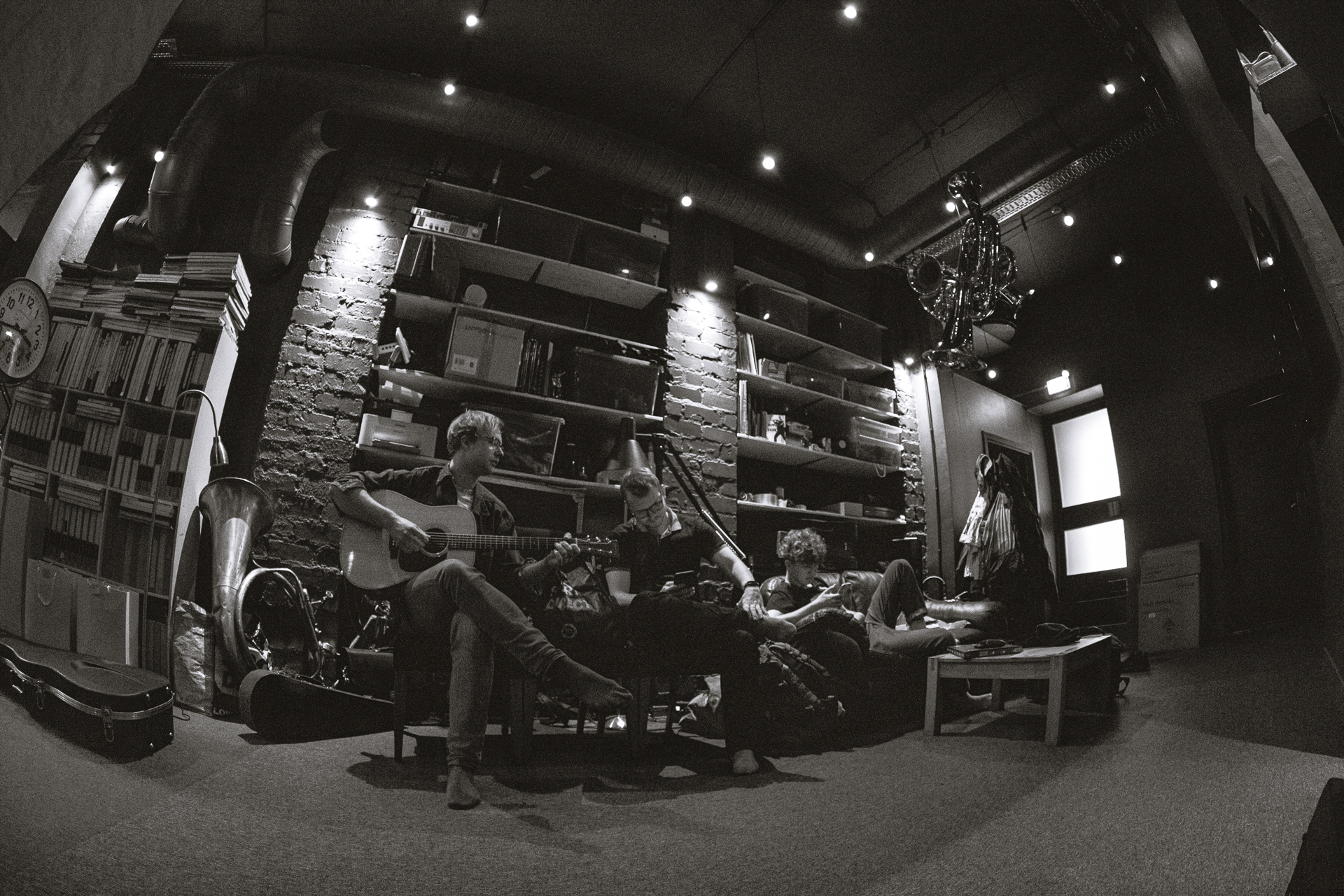
- Lõõtsavägilased (2023)

Background information
- Origin: Karksi-Nuia, Estonia
- Genres: Roots Music/Folk Music
- Instrument(s): Estonian accordion, Mandolin, Bass guitar, Acoustic guitar, Garmon
- Members: Andres Eelmaa; Ott-Mait Põldsepp; Rasmus Kadaja; Margus Põldsepp; Tobias Tae; Georg-Rasmus Mäe
- Website: lootsavagilased.ee

Lõõtsavägilased (English: Accordion Heroes) is an Estonian folk music ensemble founded in 2014.

The members of Lõõtsavägilased mainly play folk and traditional music. They have performed at all major folk festivals across Estonia and collaborated with Untsakad, Zetode, Jaan Pehk, Hardi Volmer and Metsatöll.

== History ==
The beginning of Lõõtsavägilased is sometimes considered December 2013 at the Karksi-Nuia Music School, when Margus Põldsepp created an ensemble containing his students, Andres Eelmaa, Rasmus Kadaja, and Tobias Tae, who went to study the melodeon as an additional instrument with Põldsepp.

During the beginning of the ensemble, only instrumental stories were learned, but then more and more emphasis was placed on singing.

During the first few years of the ensemble's existence, only four accordions could be seen on stage, but in 2017, soloist Andres Eelmaa exchanged his main instrument for a bass guitar to add more sound to the ensemble. In January 2019, Ott-Mait Põldsepp joined the ensemble, playing guitar and mandolin.

From 2014 – 2019, the ensemble performed more than 600 concert performances.

== Discography ==
=== Albums ===
- "Meie noor ja tormiline veri" (2015)
- "Edimise numre miis" (2016)
- "#Kolmaz" (2018)
- "Pidu kodun" (2019)
- "Lõõtsavägilased" (2022)

=== Singles ===
- "Edimise numre miis" (2016)
- "Vanapoisi reilender" (2017)
- "Kui laubä õhta jõudis" (2018)
- "Ära sinä võtku pikka naist" (2019)
- "Sabalugu" (2020)
- "Kippar Kliiverpoom" (2022)
- "Trellid Ees" (2023)

== Members ==
- Andres Eelmaa - bass guitar, vocals
- Ott-Mait Põldsepp - acoustic guitar, mandolin, vocals
- Rasmus Kadaja - Estonian accordion, garmon, vocals
- Margus Põldsepp - Estonian accordion, garmon, vocals
- Tobias Tae - Estonian accordion, garmon, vocals
- Georg-Rasmus Mäe - sound engineer
