= Marcus Gheeraerts the Younger =

Flemish painter (c.1561/62–1636)

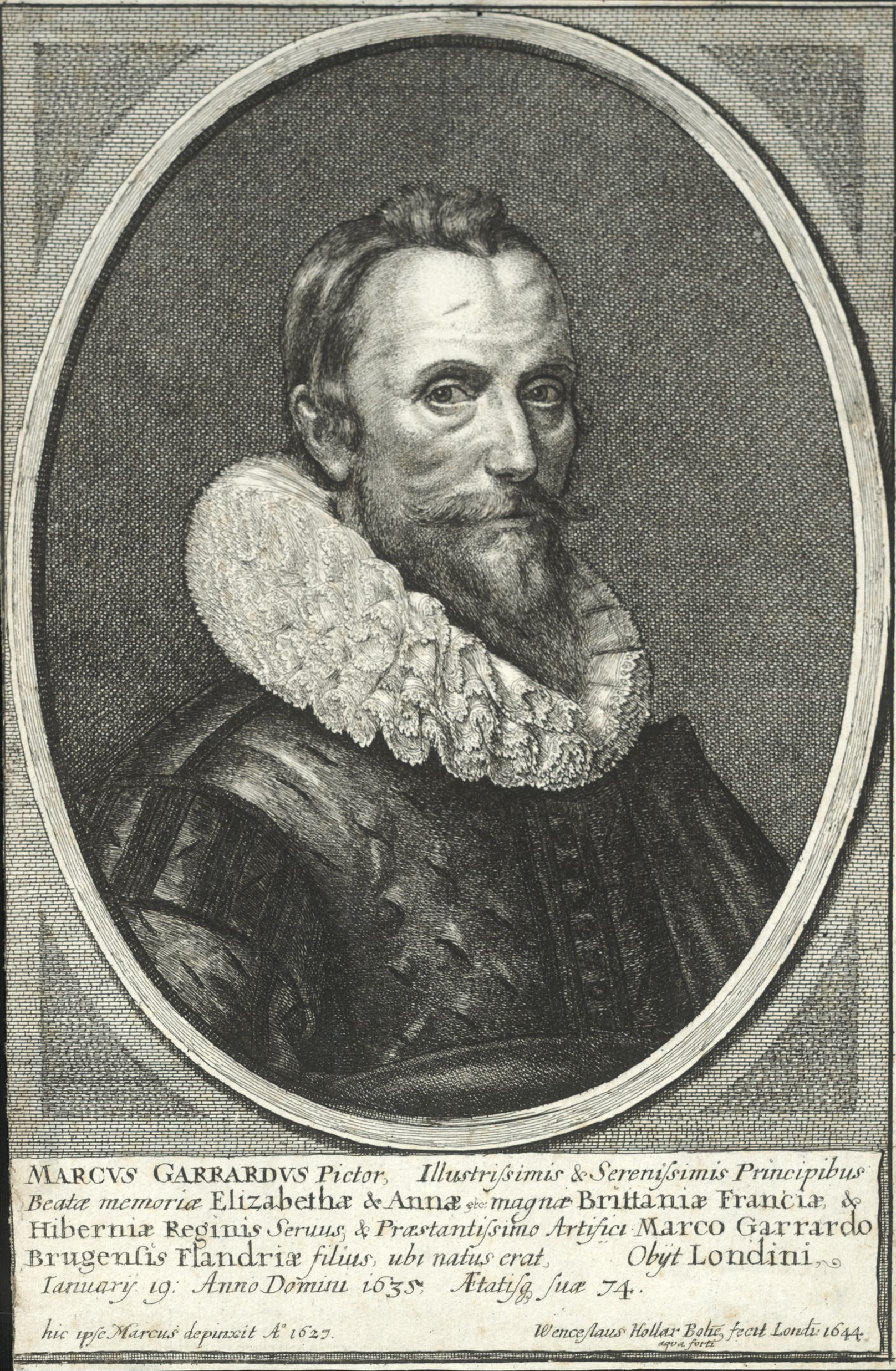
Engraving by Wenceslas Hollar, 1644, of a self-portrait of Marcus Gheeraerts the Younger, 1627 (now lost).

Marcus Gheeraerts (also written as Gerards or Geerards; c. 1561/62 – 19 January 1636) was a Flemish artist working at the Tudor court, described as "the most important artist of quality to work in England in large-scale between Eworth and van Dyck". He was brought to England as a child by his father Marcus Gheeraerts the Elder, also a painter. He became a fashionable portraitist in the last decade of the reign of Elizabeth I under the patronage of her champion and pageant-master Sir Henry Lee. He introduced a new aesthetic in English court painting that captured the essence of a sitter through close observation. He became a favorite portraitist of James I's queen Anne of Denmark, but fell out of fashion in the late 1610s.

== Family ==
Marcus Gheeraerts the Younger (sometimes known as Mark Garrard) was born in Bruges, the son of the artist Marcus Gheeraerts the Elder and his wife Johanna. Hardly anything is known of the paintings of the elder Gheeraerts, although his work as a printmaker was renowned in Europe.

Like other Protestant artists from the Habsburg Netherlands, Gheeraerts the Elder fled to England with his son to escape persecution in his home country during the governership of the Duke of Alba. His wife was a Catholic and remained behind and is believed to have died a few years later. Father and son are recorded living with a Dutch servant in the London parish of St Mary Abchurch in 1568. On 9 September 1571, the elder Gheeraerts remarried. His new wife was Susanna de Critz, a member of an exiled family from Antwerp.

It is not known by whom young Marcus was trained, although it is likely to have been his father. He was possibly also a pupil of Lucas de Heere. Records suggest that Marcus was active as a painter by 1586. In 1590, he married Magdalena, the sister of his stepmother Susanna and of the painter John de Critz. The couple had six children, only two of whom seem to have survived—a son, Marcus III (c. 1602 – c. 1654), also a painter, and a son Henry (1604 – August 1650). His half-sister Sara married the painter Isaac Oliver in 1602.

== Career ==
=== A new aesthetic ===
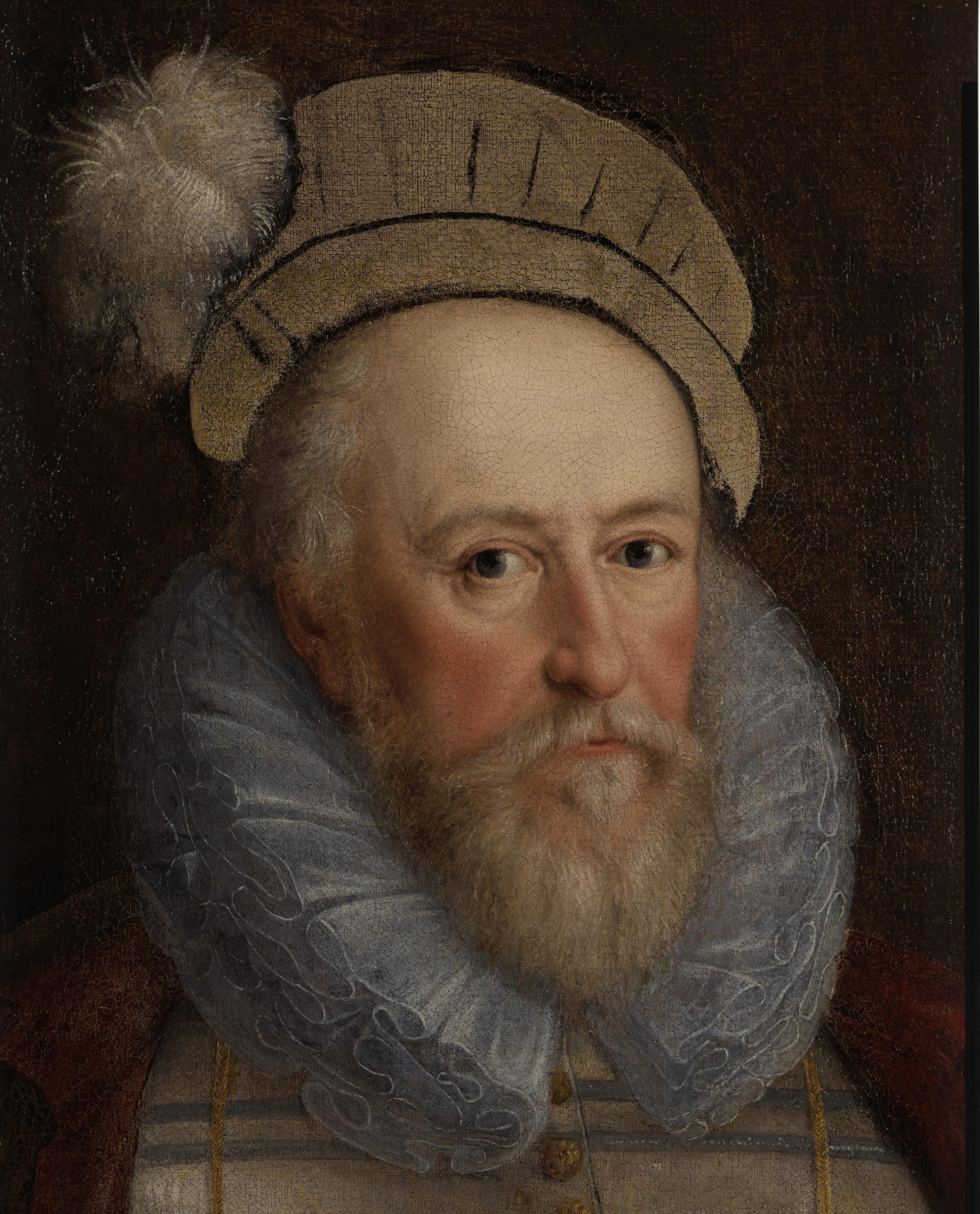
Unfinished portrait sketch of Sir Henry Lee, likely to have been from life; oil on canvas, c. 1600

The earliest signed works by Gheeraerts the Younger date from c. 1592, but Roy Strong identified a set of portraits of William Cecil, 1st Baron Burghley dated to around 1586 as likely based on an original by Gheeraerts. Although raised in England, Gheeraerts' work reflects a continental aesthetic very different from the flat modeling of features and pure, brilliant colours associated with Elizabethan artists such as Nicolas Hilliard. "The implications suggest that Oliver and Gheeraerts singly or together visited Antwerp in the late eighties and were influenced by the portrait style of Frans Pourbus."

From around 1590, Gheeraerts led a "revolution" in English portraiture. For the first time in English art sitters were rendered in three dimensions, achieving a lifelike impression through tonality and shadow. New too were capturing the character of individual sitters through close observation and the use of sombre colour and greyed flesh tones. Gheeraerts was one of the first English artists to paint on canvas rather than wood panel, allowing much larger pictures to be produced. He also introduced the full-length figure set out-out-of-doors in a naturalistic landscape for full-scale portraiture, a feature seen in portrait miniatures of the same era.

The need for assistants to complete the backgrounds and details of the new large canvas paintings, and the numbers of surviving copies and variants of Gheeraerts' works, suggest a studio or workshop staffed with assistants and apprentices. There are similarities of features between Gheeraert's portraits of Robert Devereux, 2nd Earl of Essex and miniatures of Essex by Gheeraerts' brother-in-law Isaac Oliver, and later between their portraits of Anne of Denmark, but it is unknown whether the two artists collaborated or shared patterns for portraits.

=== Elizabethan success ===
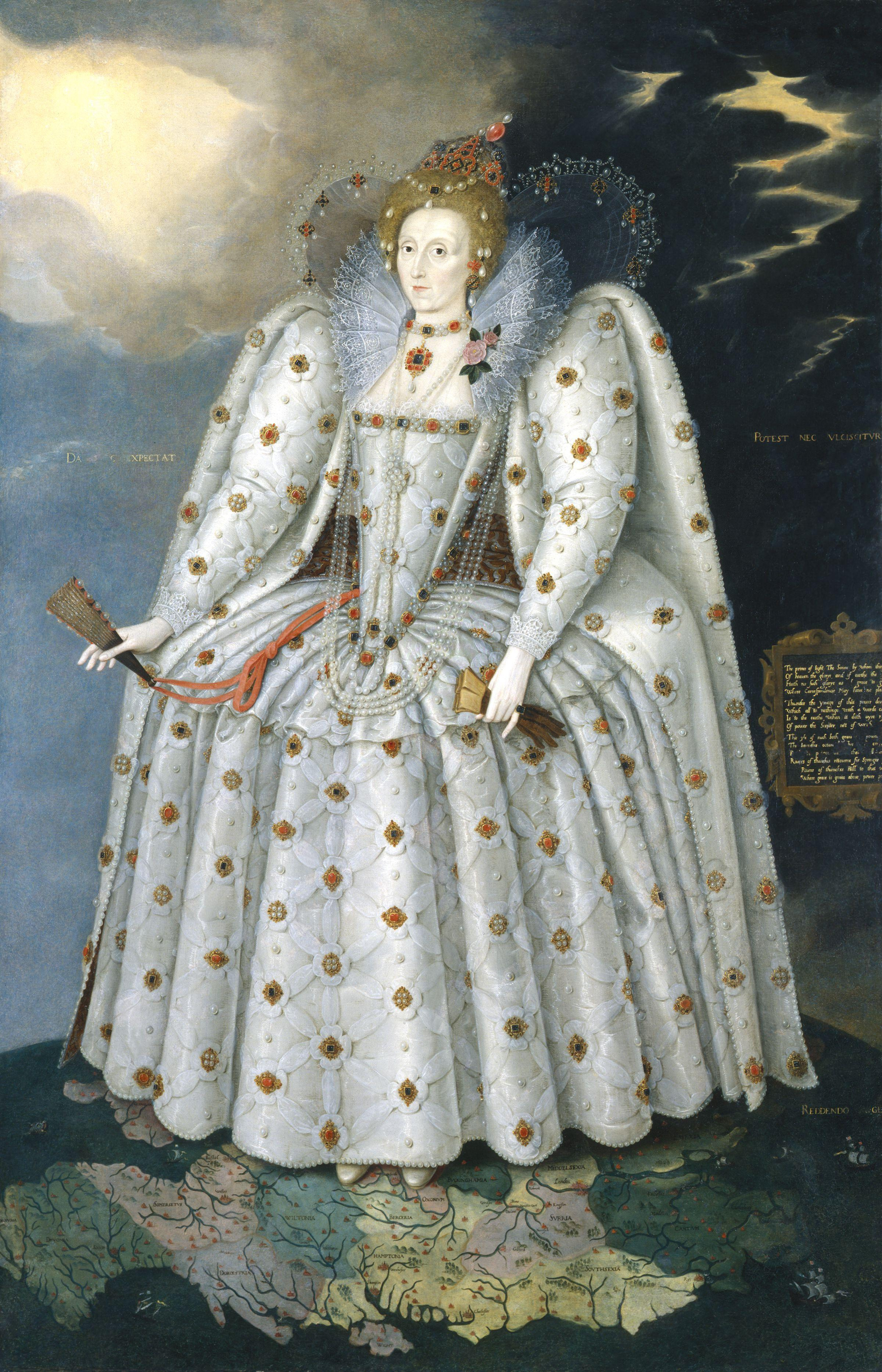
Queen Elizabeth I, the Ditchley Portrait, c. 1592. Oil on canvas, National Portrait Gallery, London

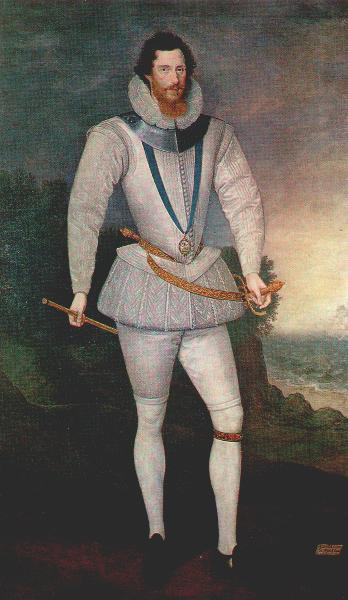
Robert Devereux, Earl of Essex, 1596

Sir Henry Lee of Ditchley, who retired as Queen's Champion in the autumn of 1590, was the architect of much of the chivalric pageantry at the court of Elizabeth I. Lee became Gheeraerts' patron around 1590, and Gheeraerts quickly became fashionable in court circles, creating emblematic portraits associated with the elaborate costumed iconography of Lee's Accession Day tilts. The Queen likely sat to him for the Ditchley Portrait of her in 1592, which depicted her standing close to "Lee's Oxfordshire estate at Ditchley", and her favourite Robert Devereux, 2nd Earl of Essex employed Gheeraerts from 1596. The royal accounts for 1596–98 also include payments for decorative work by "Marcus Gerarde". Another Gheeraerts portrait of Elizabeth is in the collection of Trinity College, Cambridge.

The Ditchley Portrait seems to have always been at Lee's home in Oxfordshire, and was likely painted for (or commemorates) her two-day visit to Ditchley in 1592. In this image, the Queen stands on a map of England, her feet on Oxfordshire. The painting has been trimmed and the background poorly repainted, so that the inscription and sonnet are incomplete. Storms rage behind her while the sun shines before her, and she wears a jewel in the form of a celestial or armillary sphere close to her left ear. The new portrait aesthetic did not please the aging queen, and in the many versions of this painting made with the allegorical items removed, likely in Gheeraerts' workshop, Elizabeth's features are "softened" from the stark realism of her face in the original. One of these was sent as a diplomatic gift to Ferdinando I de' Medici, Grand Duke of Tuscany and is now in the Palazzo Pitti.

Around 1594, Gheeraerts painted a portrait of Lee's cousin Captain Thomas Lee standing in a landscape wearing Irish dress. The iconography of the portrait alludes to Captain Lee's service in Ireland. Gheeraerts also painted several portraits of Sir Henry Lee himself, including a full-length portrait in his robes of the Order of the Garter (1602).

Essex (whose mother Lettice Knollys, Countess of Leicester was related to Sir Henry Lee) seems to have used Gheeraerts exclusively for large-scale portraits from the mid-1590s. The first of these is the 1596 full-length portrait of Essex at Woburn Abbey, where he stands in a landscape with the burning Spanish city of Cádiz in the background. Many half-length and three-quarter-length portraits of Essex with plain backgrounds appear to be studio variants of sittings to Gheeraerts. Like Lee, Essex was an important participant in the Accession Day tilts.

Sir Roy Strong wrote of the Ditchley and Woburn Abbey portraits:

Gheeraerts' success lay in his ability to subdue the bourgeois robustness of Flemish painting and fuse it with the melancholic, aristocratic, courtly fantasy of late Elizabethan England ... Elizabeth and Essex remain Gheeraerts' supreme works deserving to rank, along with some of Hilliard's portrait miniatures, as great masterpieces of early English painting.

Gheeraerts' popularity does not seem to have been tainted by the patronage of participants in the Essex Rebellion (both Essex and Thomas Lee were executed for treason in 1601).

=== Jacobean years ===
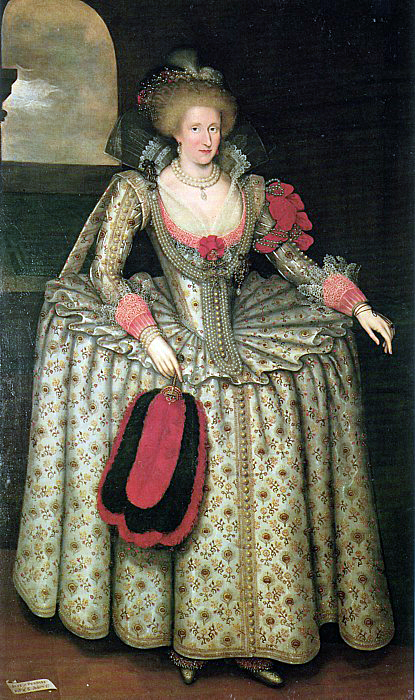
Anne of Denmark, 1611–1614, oil on canvas, Woburn Abbey

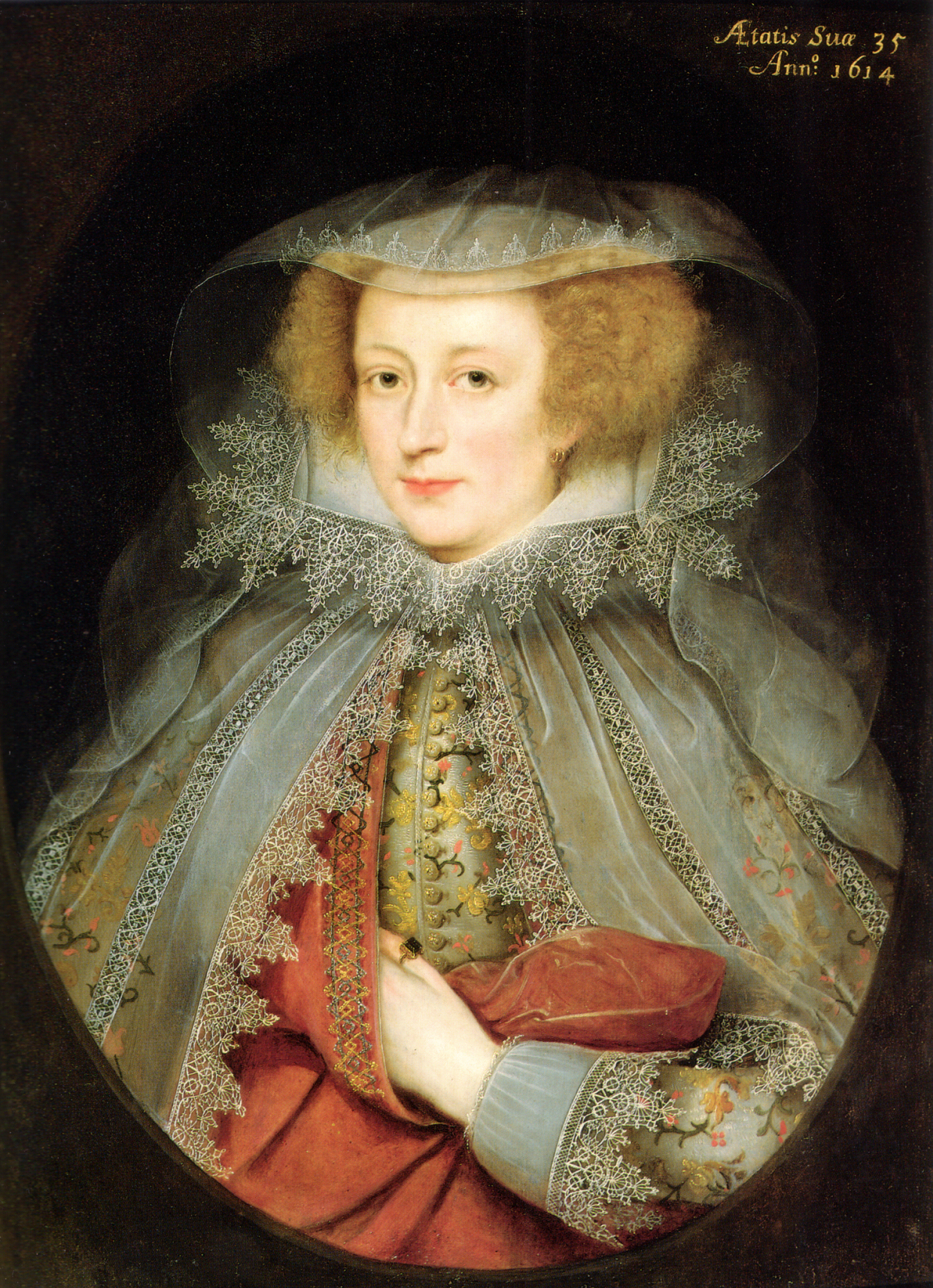
Catherine Killigrew, Lady Jermyn, 1614.

Gheeraerts remained at the forefront of fashion in the years immediately following Elizabeth's death in 1603. James I's queen, Anne of Denmark, employed Gheerearts for large scale paintings and his brother-in-law Isaac Oliver for miniatures. In 1611 Gheeraerts was paid for portraits of the King, Queen, and Princess Elizabeth. A portrait of Anne, likely wearing mourning for her son Henry Frederick, Prince of Wales in the winter of 1612-13 is also attributed to Gheeraerts.

His 1611 portrait of Frances Howard, Countess of Hertford in rich attire framed by a draped silk curtain, with a fringed pelmet across the top of the canvas, is the first known instance of a portrait setting that would be used by Hilliard's former apprentice William Larkin in a series of full-length portraits between 1613 and 1618. Overall, Gheeraerts' portraiture in the Jacobean era is characterized by the "quietness, pensiveness, and gentle charm of mood" seen in his portraits of Catherine Killigrew, Lady Jermyn (1614) and Mary Throckmorton, Lady Scudamore (1615).

Isaac Oliver died in 1617, and around the same time Gheeraerts' position at court began to decline as the result of competition from a new generation of immigrants. Anne of Denmark died in 1619, and although Gheeraerts was part of her funeral procession as "Queen's Painter", the Netherlander Paul van Somer had likely displaced him as her chief portraitist some time before. For the last twenty years of his life Gheeraerts was employed chiefly by the country gentry and by academic sitters.

Gheeraerts was a member of the Court of the Painter-Stainers' Company in the 1620s and had an apprentice, Ferdinando Clifton, who was a freeman of the Company in 1627. Gheeraerts died on 19 January 1636.

== Gallery ==
=== Elizabethan ===
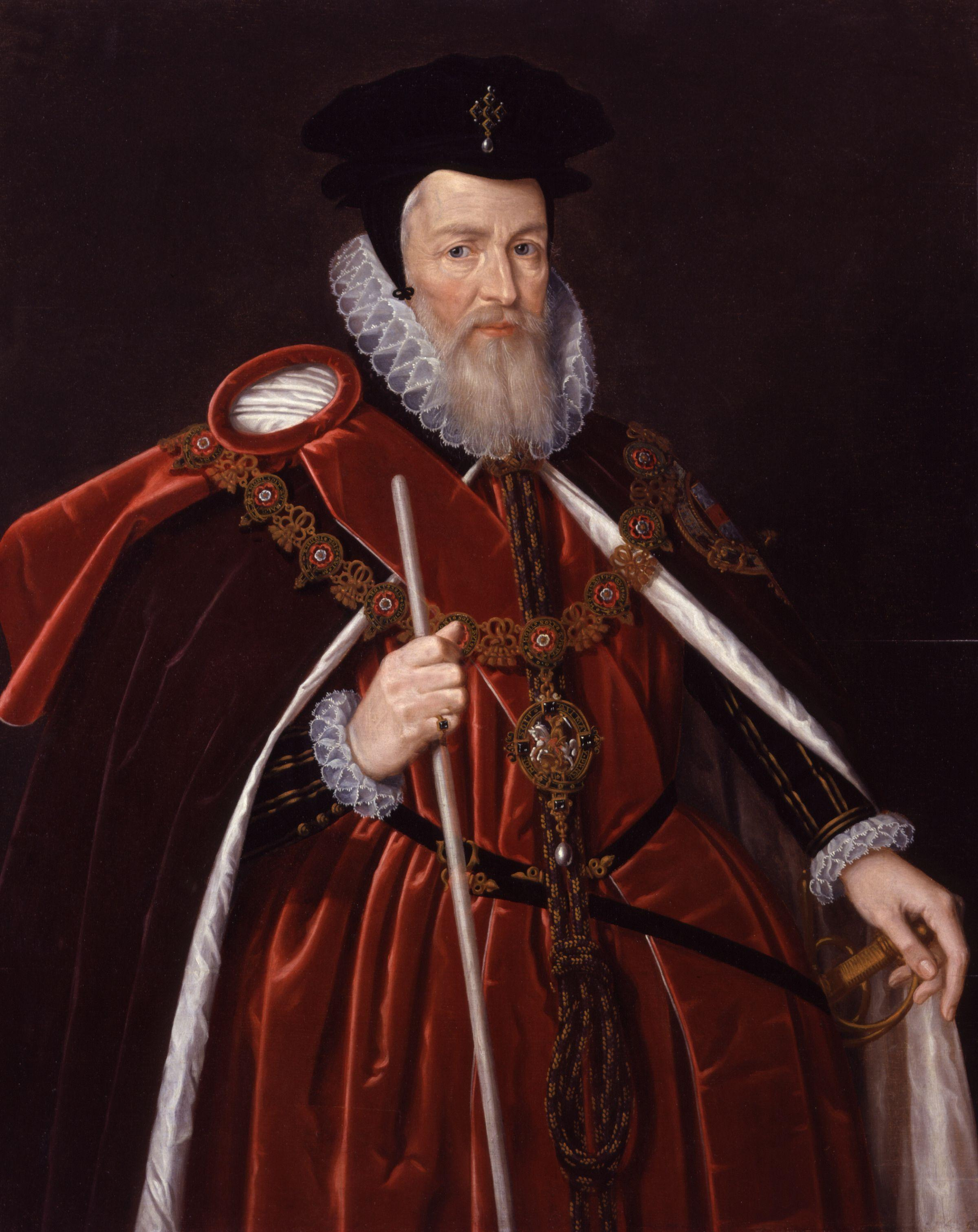
Portrait of William Cecil, 1st Baron Burghley, after 1585, oil on panel, attributed to Gheeraerts, National Portrait Gallery, London

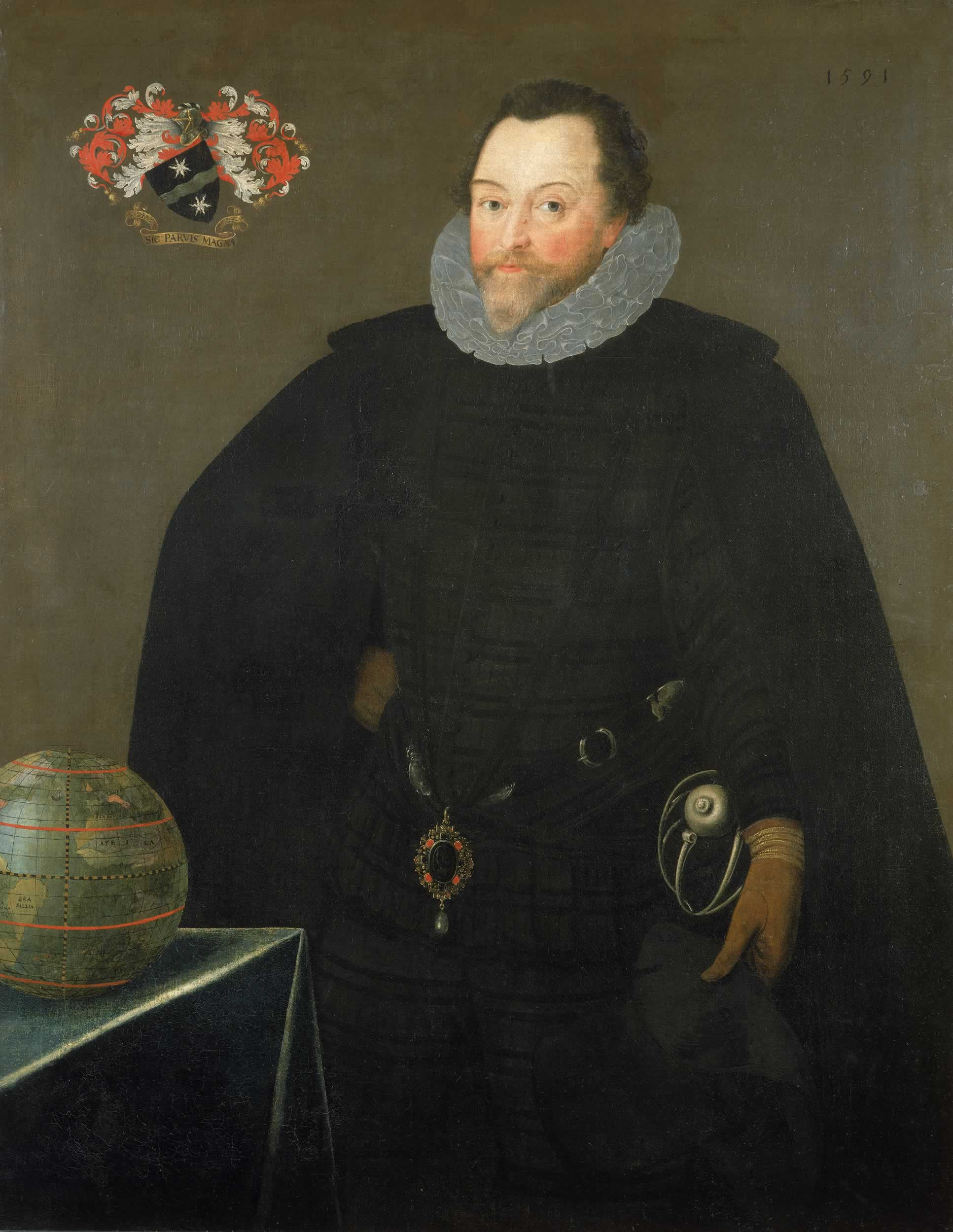
Sir Francis Drake, 1591.

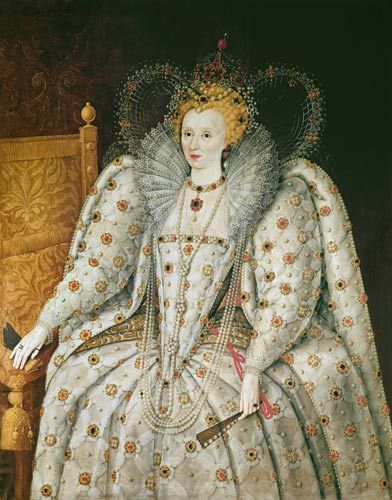
"Softened" portrait of Elizabeth I, Gheeraerts studio, Palazzo Pitti, Florence

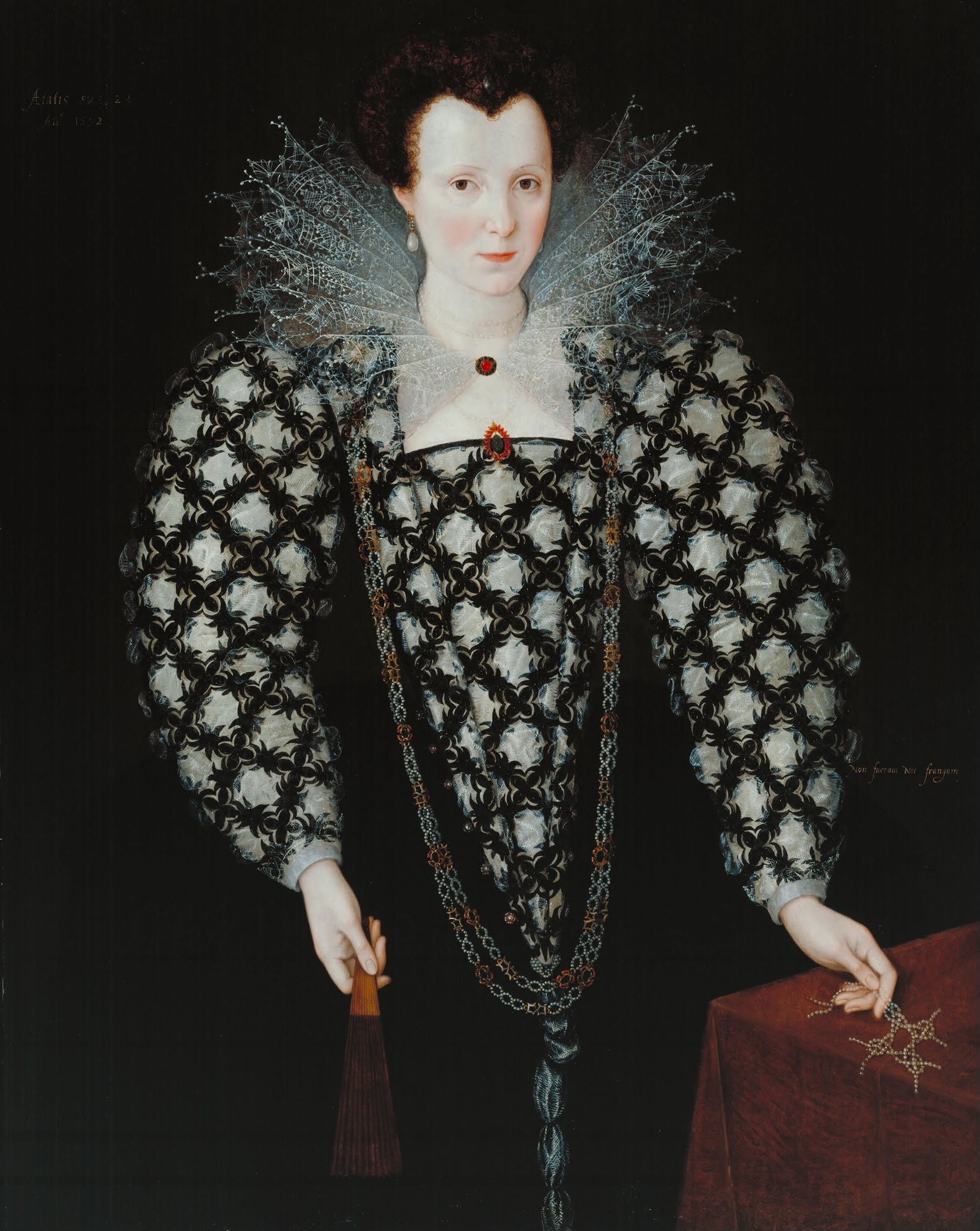
Called Mary Rogers, Lady Harington, 1592, oil on panel.

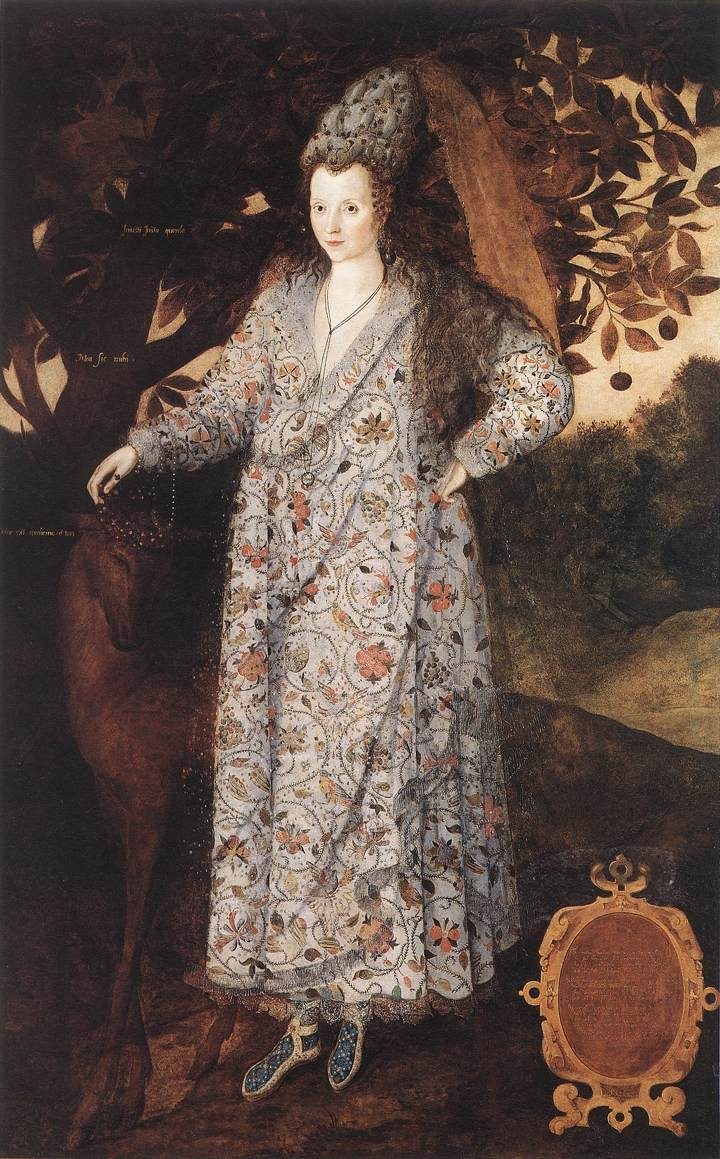
Portrait of an Unknown Woman 1590-1600. Oil on canvas, Royal Collection, Hampton Court long thought to have been a pregnant Queen Elizabeth I owing to the frame having a plaquard saying Queen Elizabeth it is now believed to have been a swapped frame.

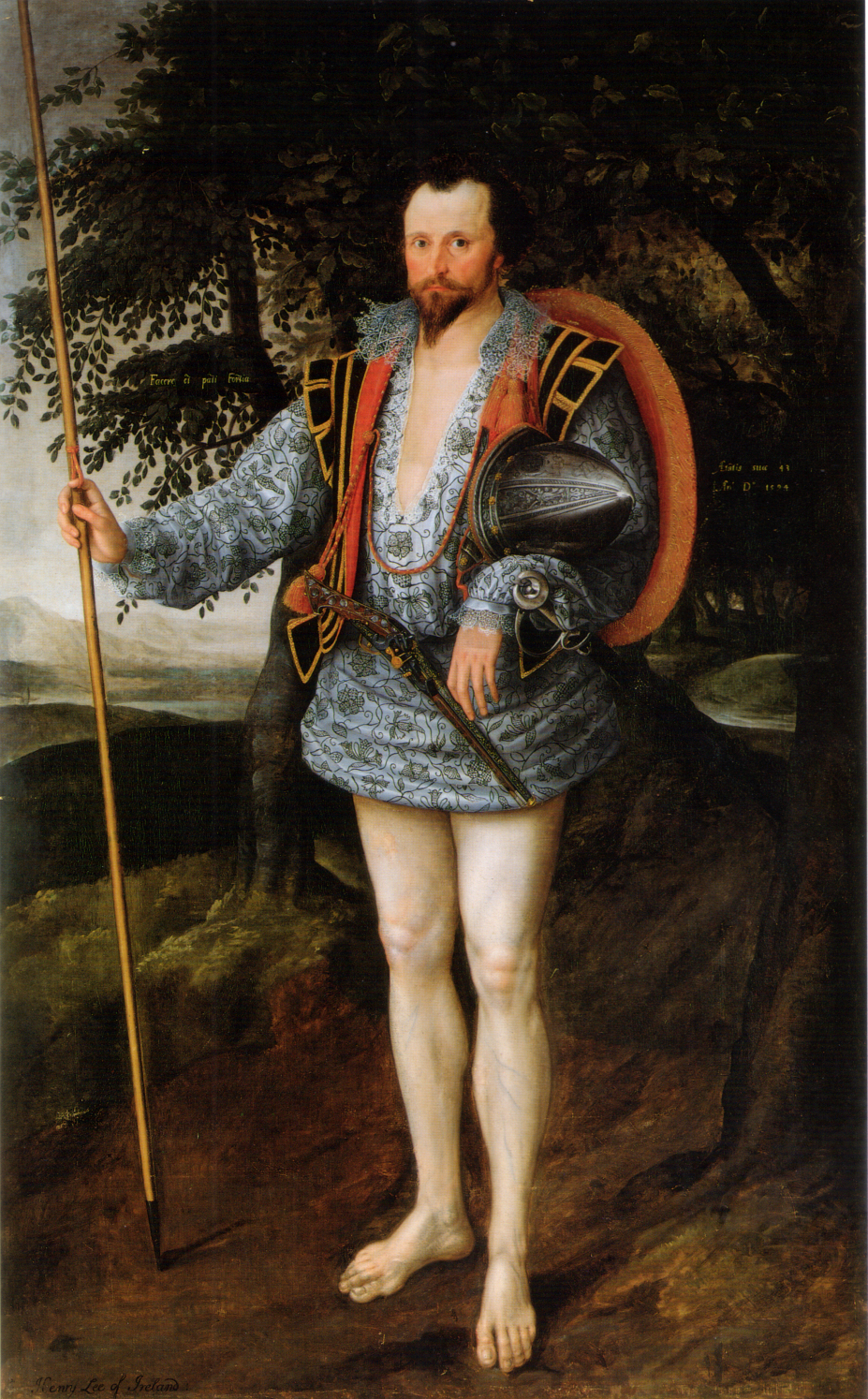
Captain Thomas Lee, oil on canvas, 1594

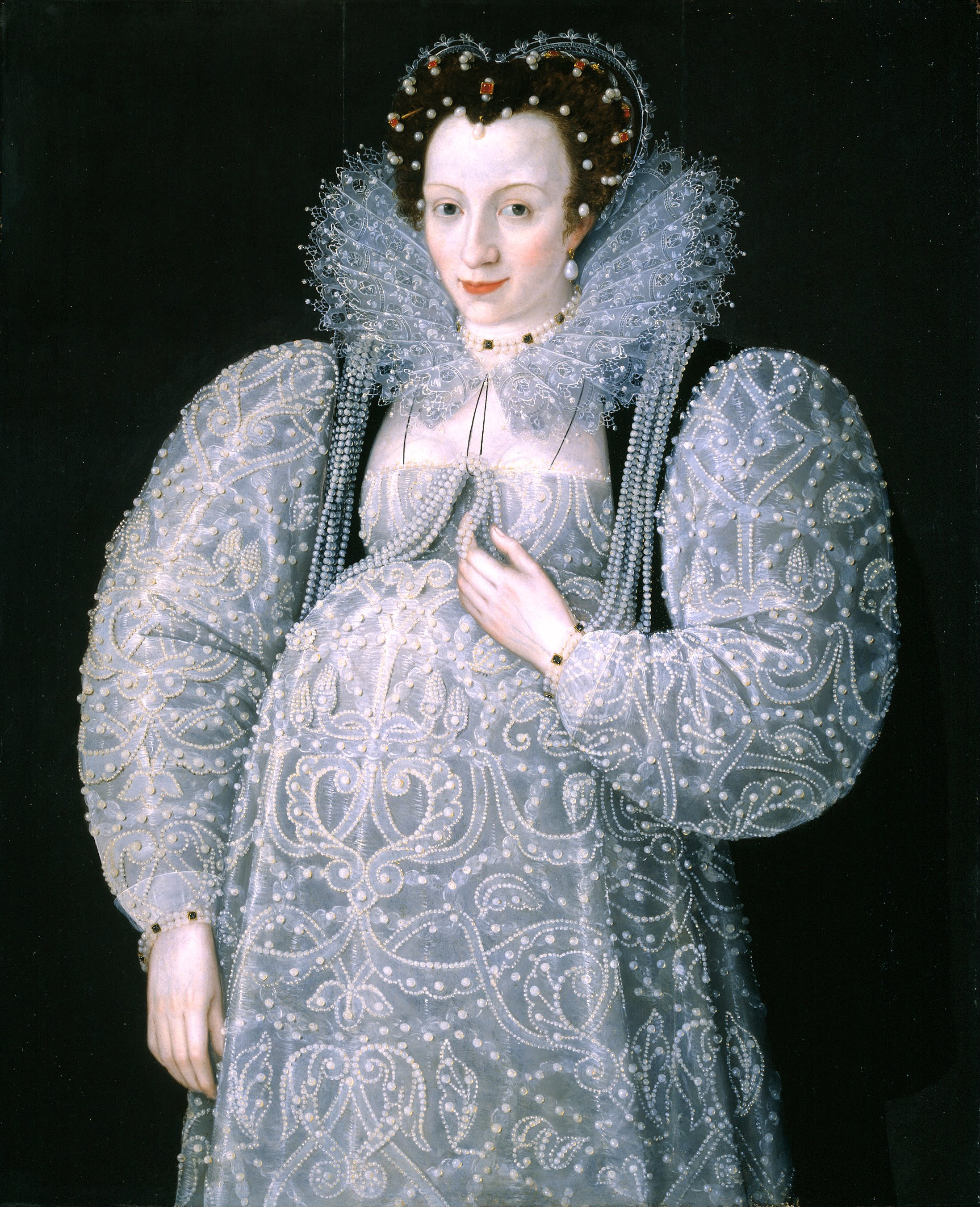
Portrait of an Unknown Lady, c. 1595 (possibly Lettice Knollys, Countess of Leicester)

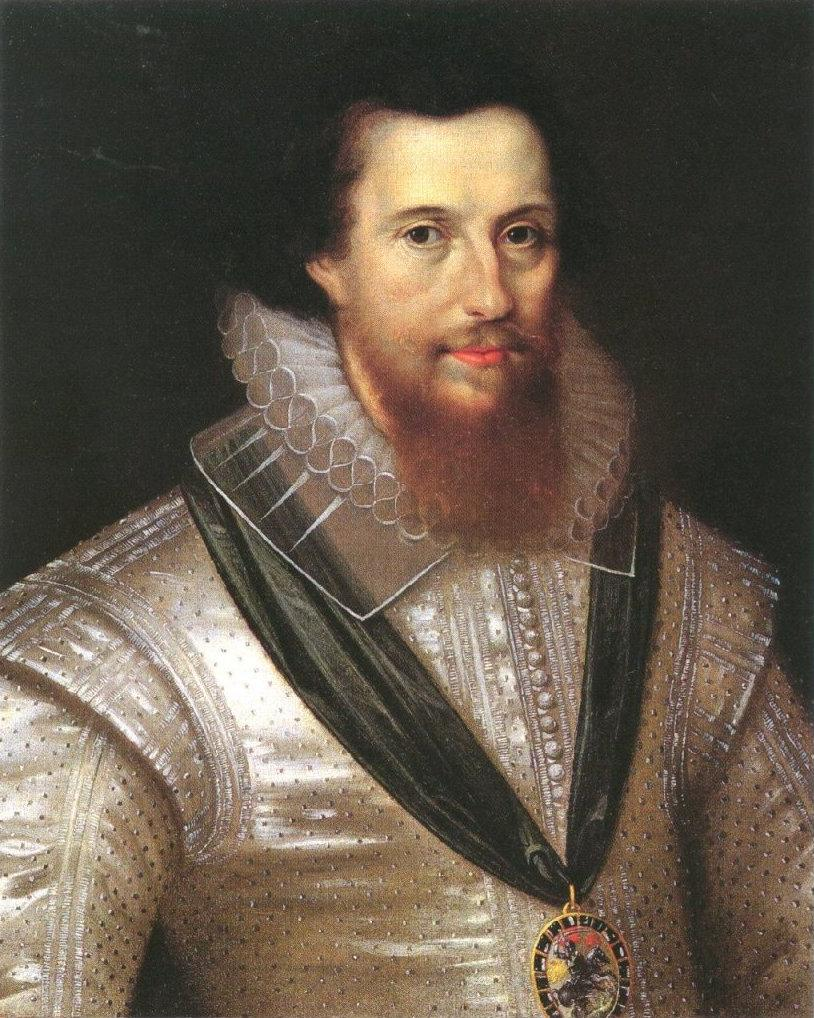
Robert Devereux, Earl of Essex, Gheeraerts studio c. 1596

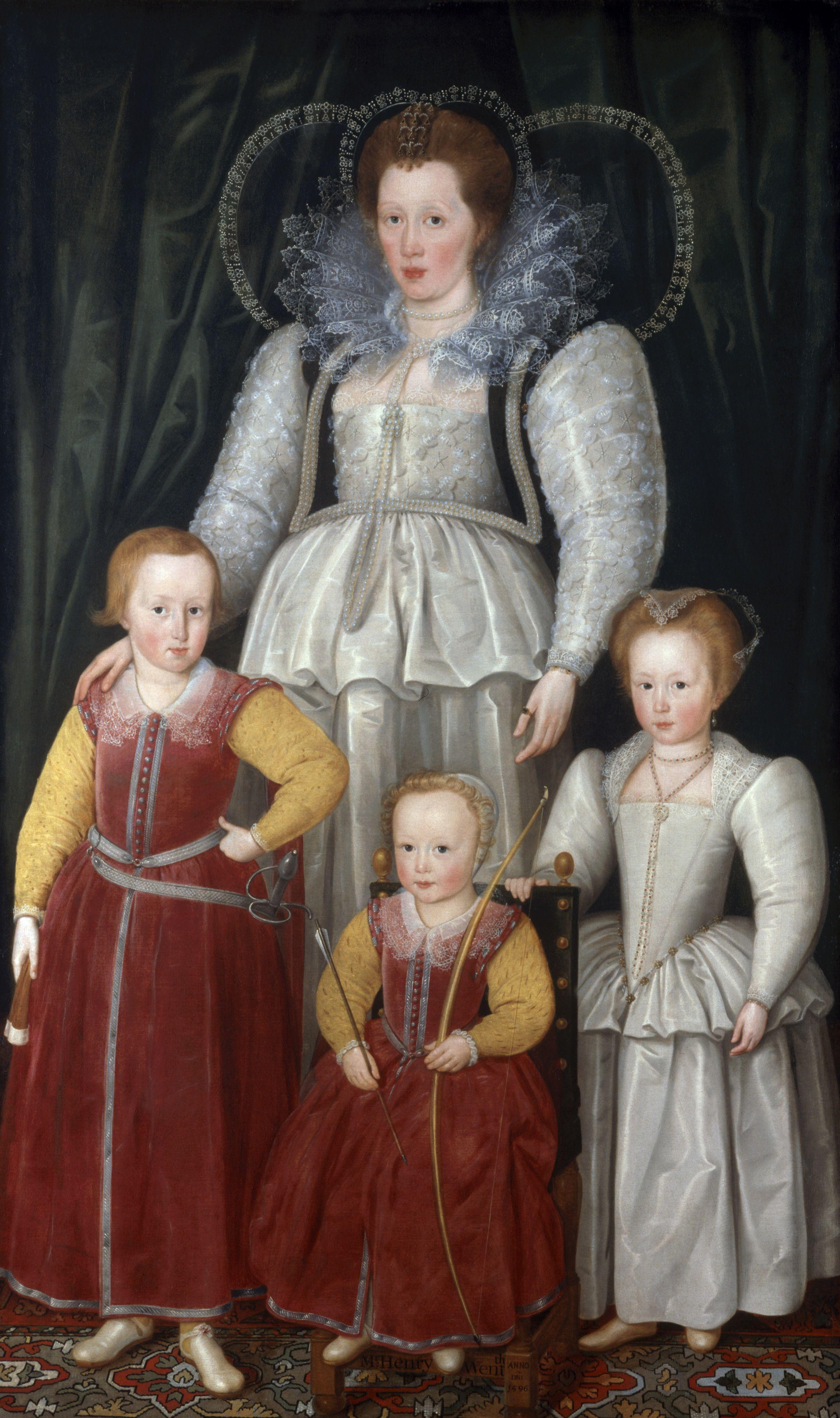
Anne, Lady Pope with her children, 1596, National Portrait Gallery, London

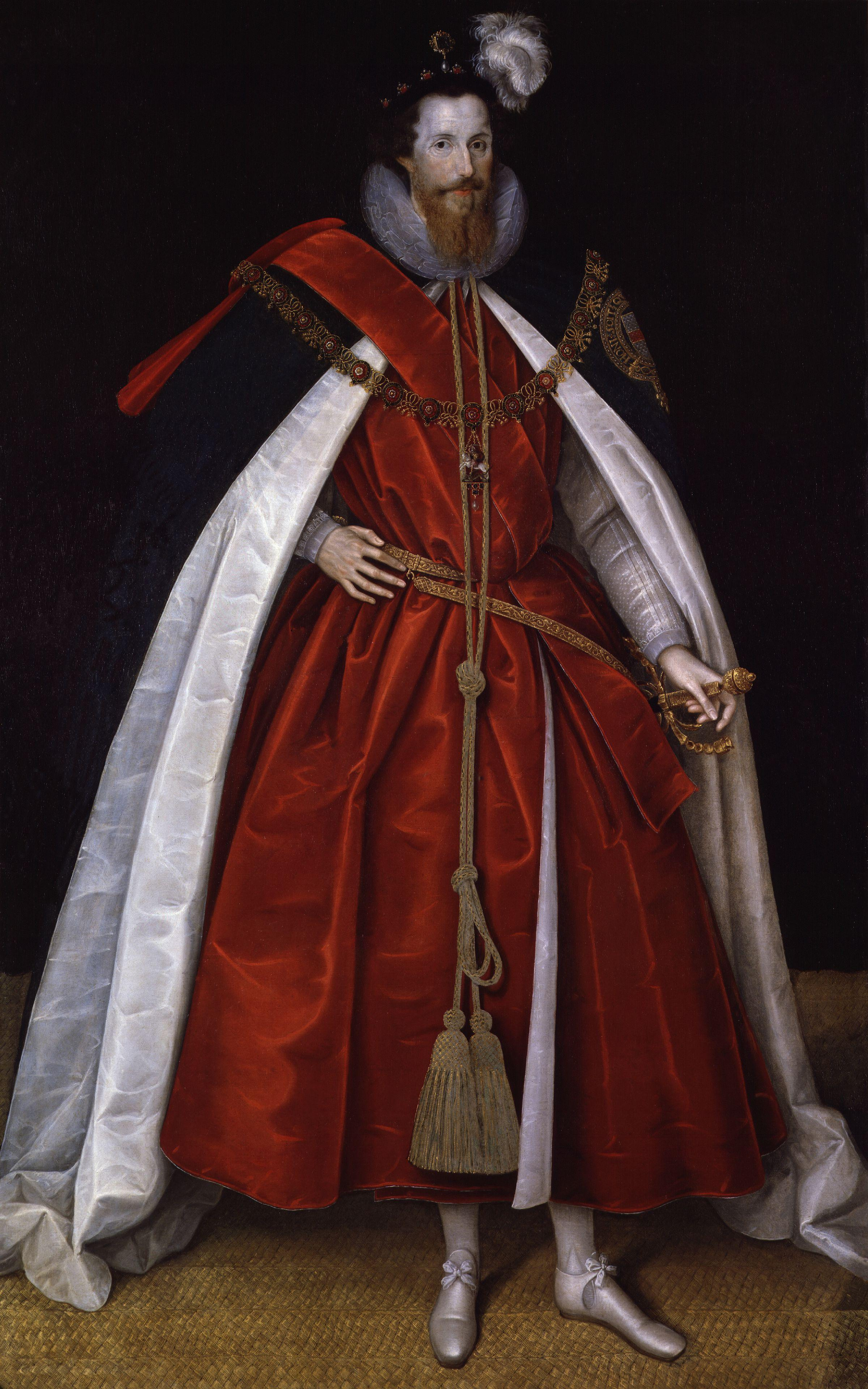
Robert Devereux, 2nd Earl of Essex in Garter robes, c. 1597, National Portrait Gallery, London

=== Jacobean ===
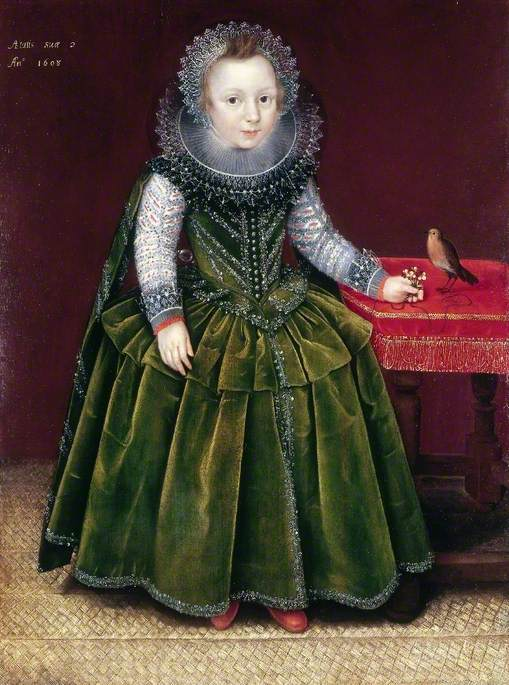
Portrait of a Boy Aged 2, 1608, Compton Verney

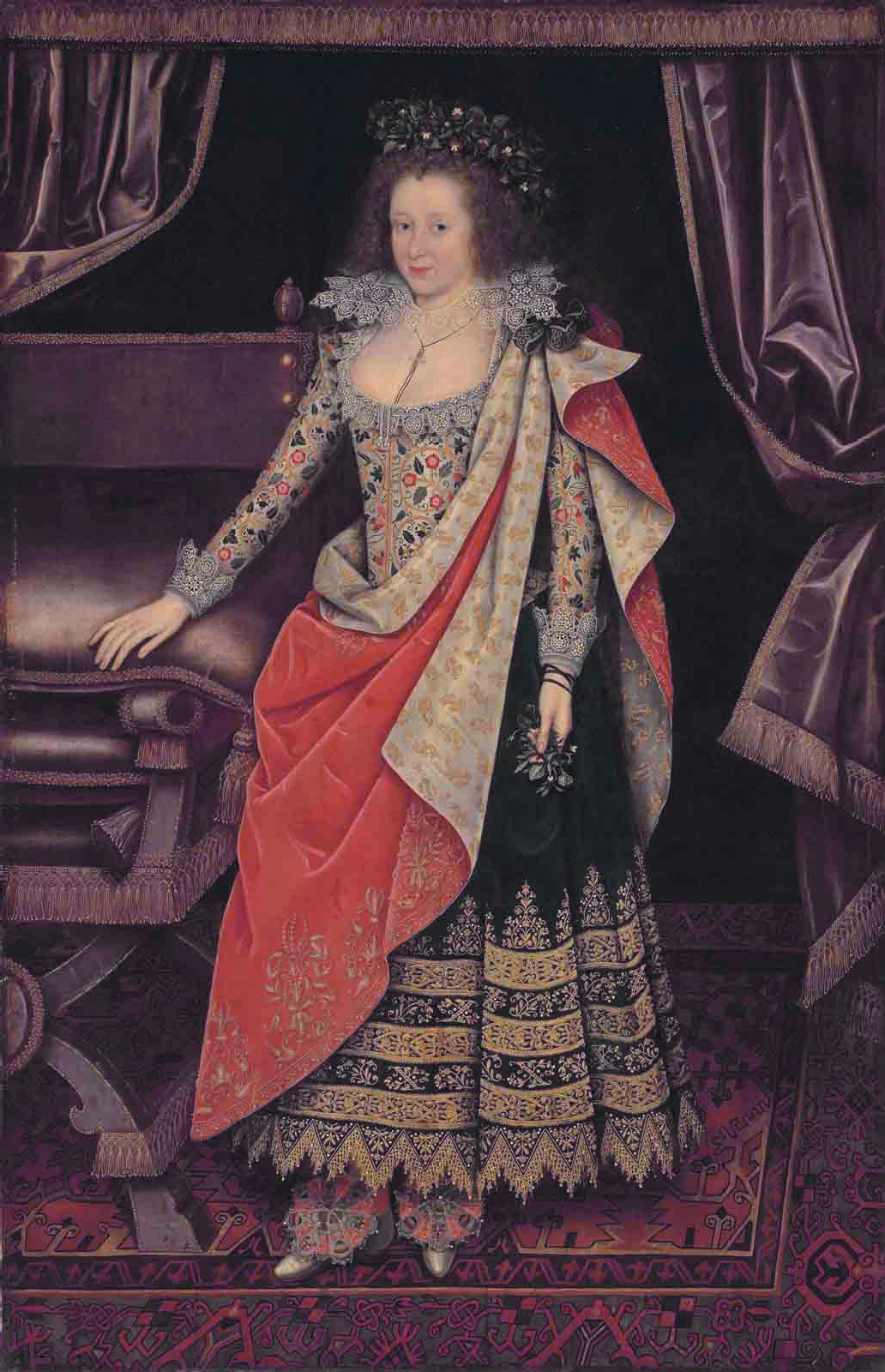
Frances Howard, Countess of Hertford, 1611, oil on canvas

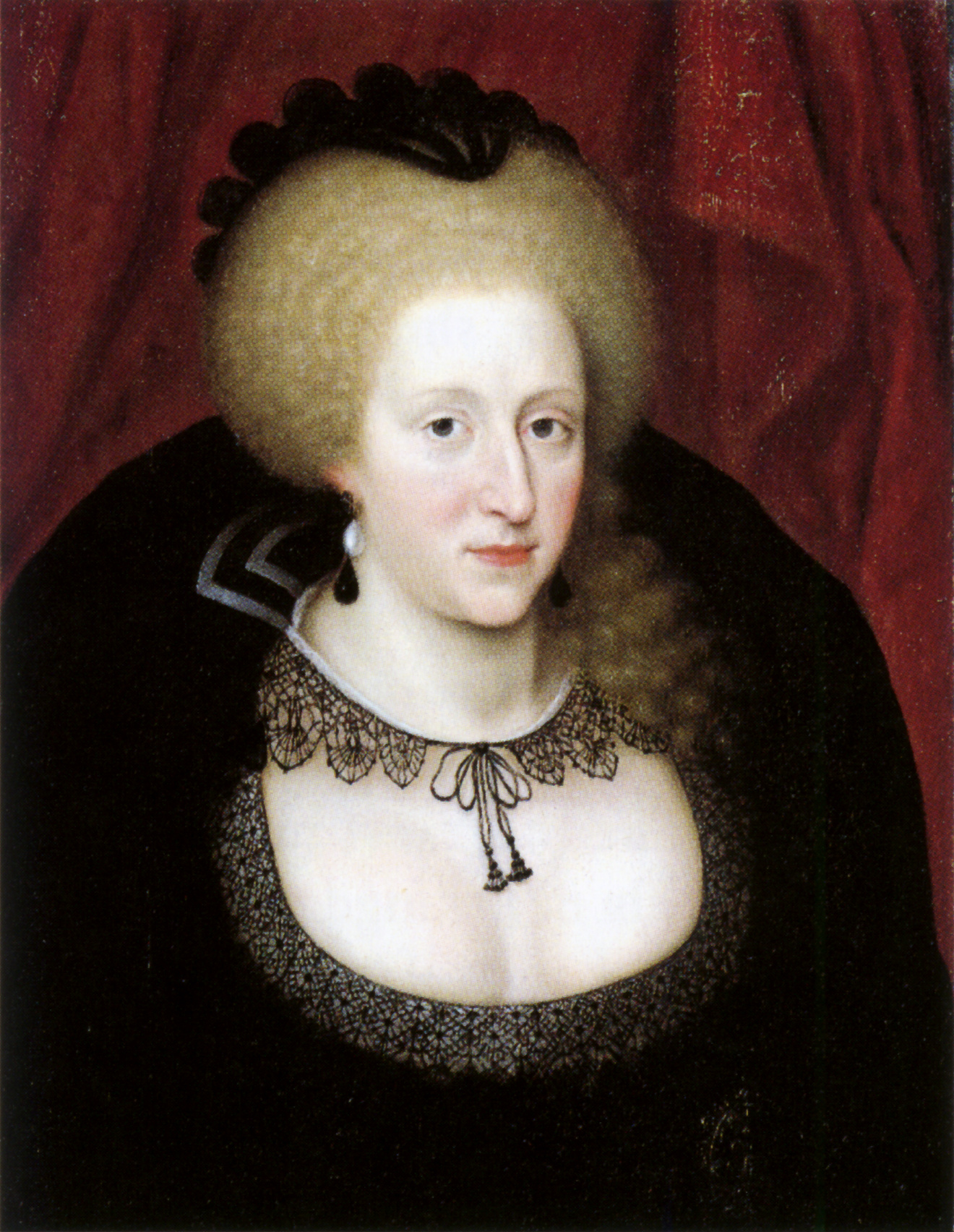
Anne of Denmark in Mourning (possibly for her son Henry Frederick, Prince of Wales), c. 1612

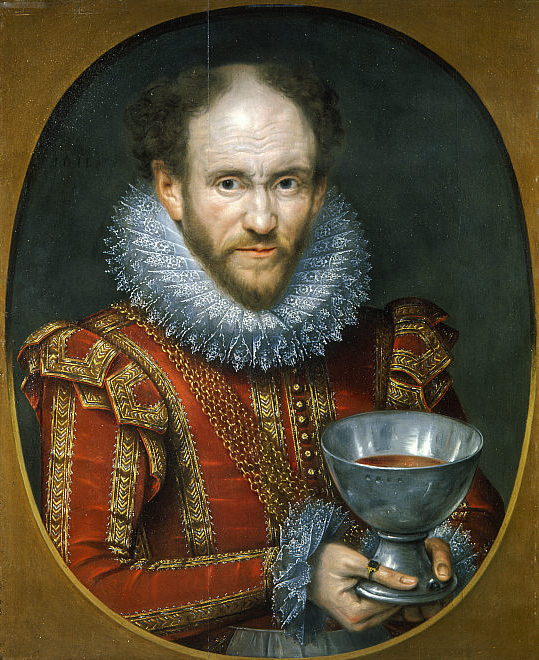
Tom Durie, Anne of Denmark's fool, 1614, oil on panel, National Galleries of Scotland

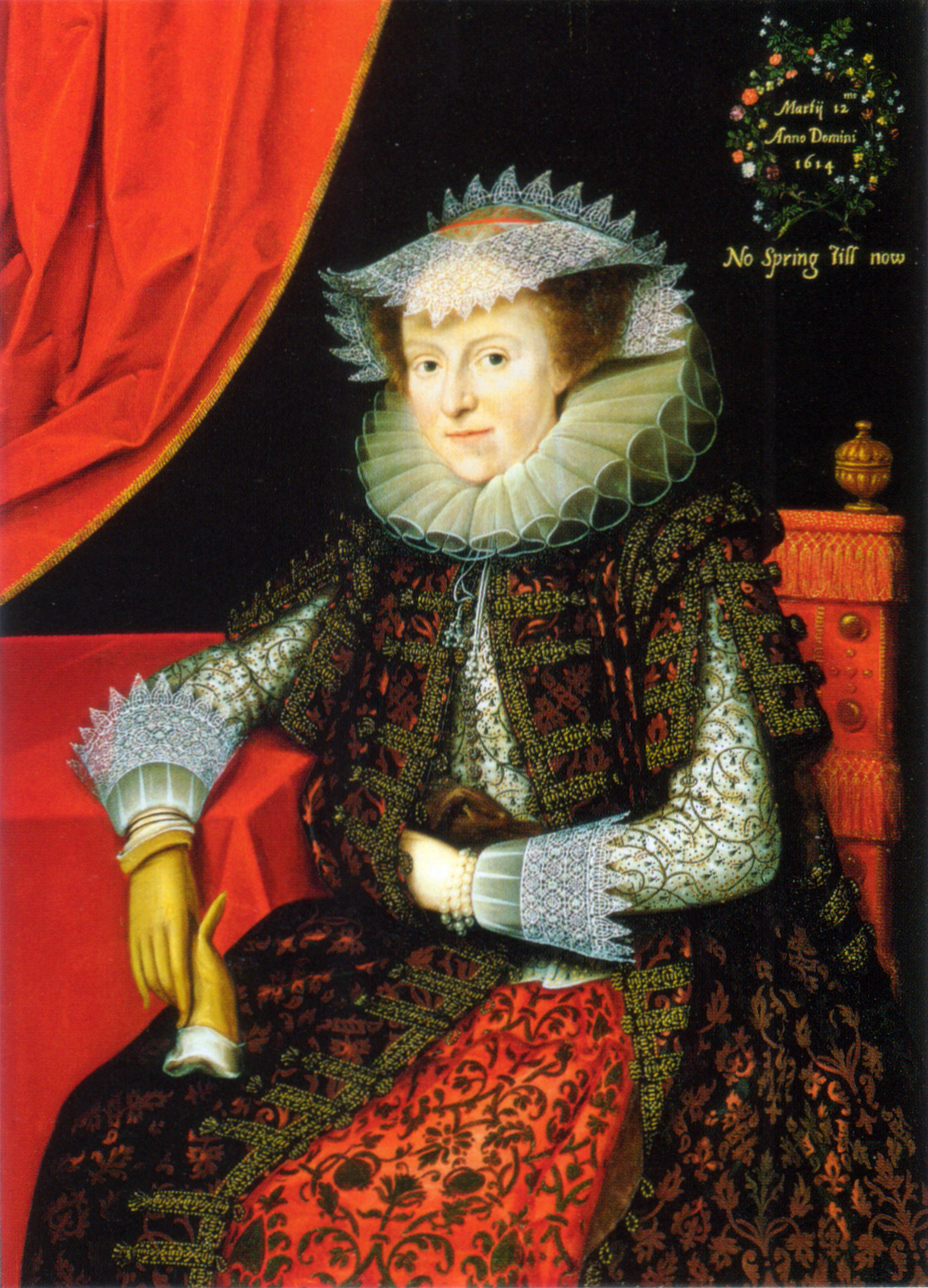
Mary Throckmorton Lady Scudamore, 1615, oil on panel, National Portrait Gallery, London

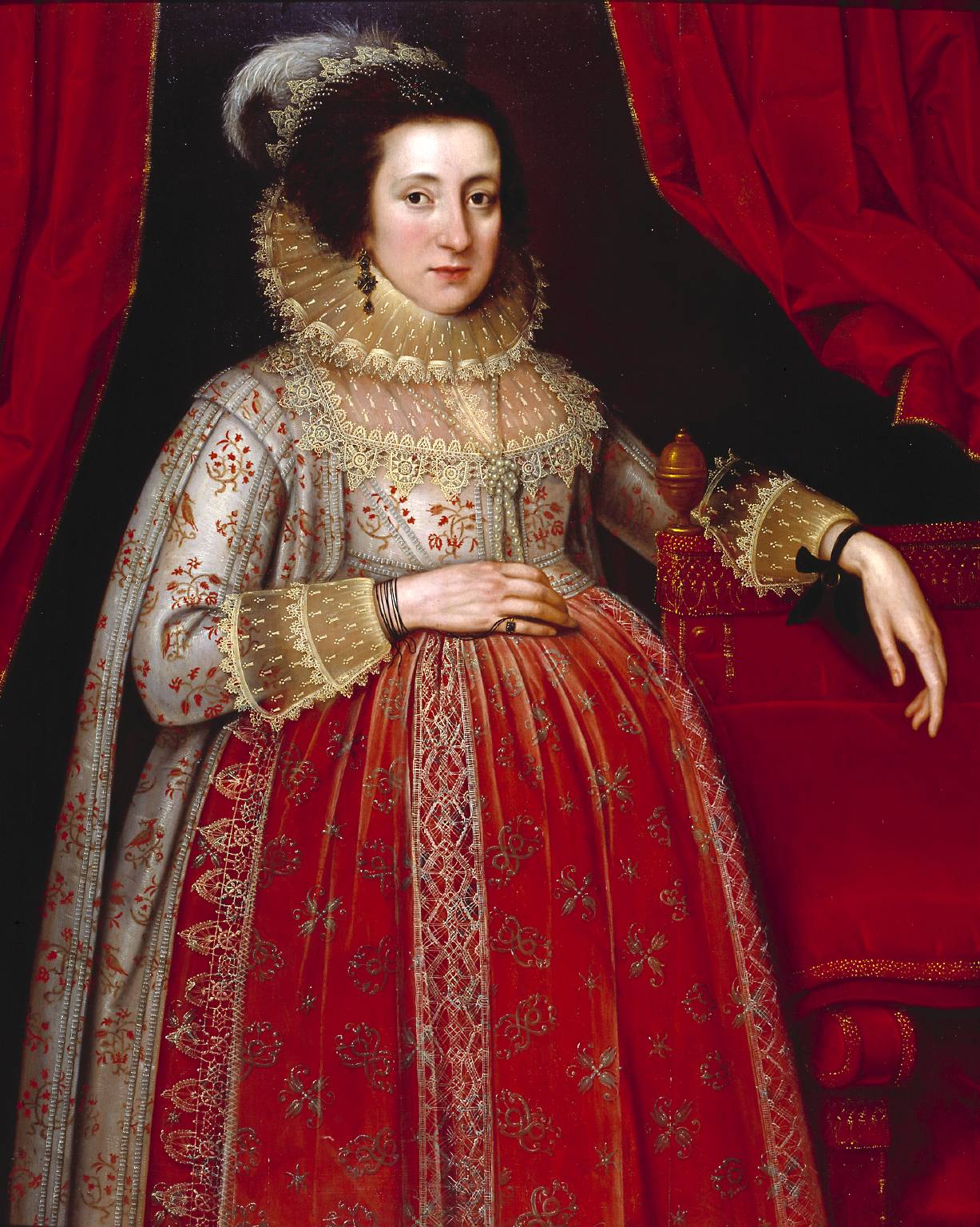
Portrait of a Woman in Red, 1620, oil on canvas, Tate

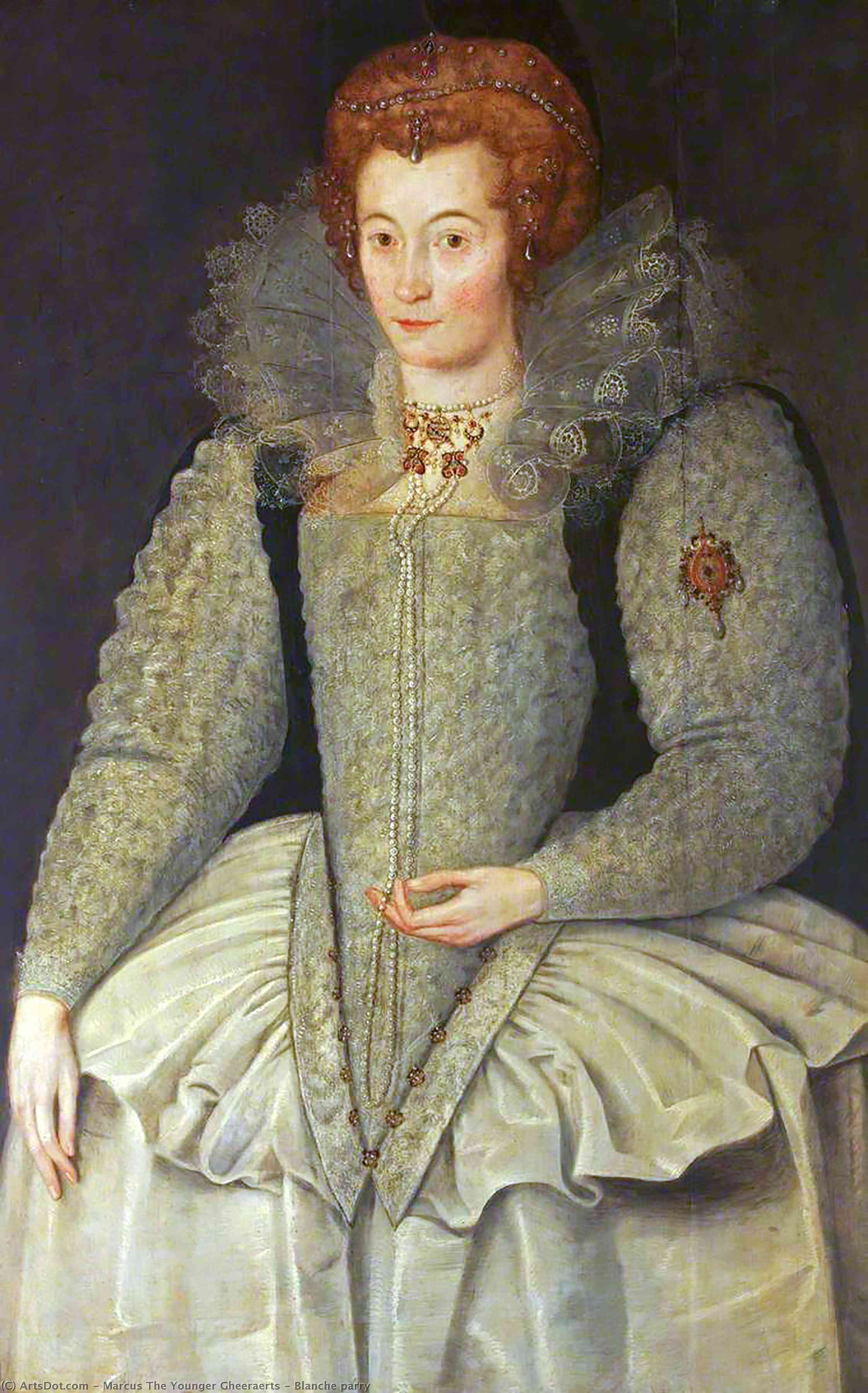
Blanche Parry

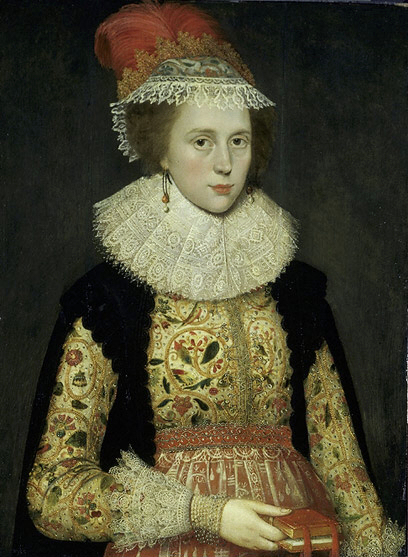
Margaret Laton, c. 1620, Victoria and Albert Museum

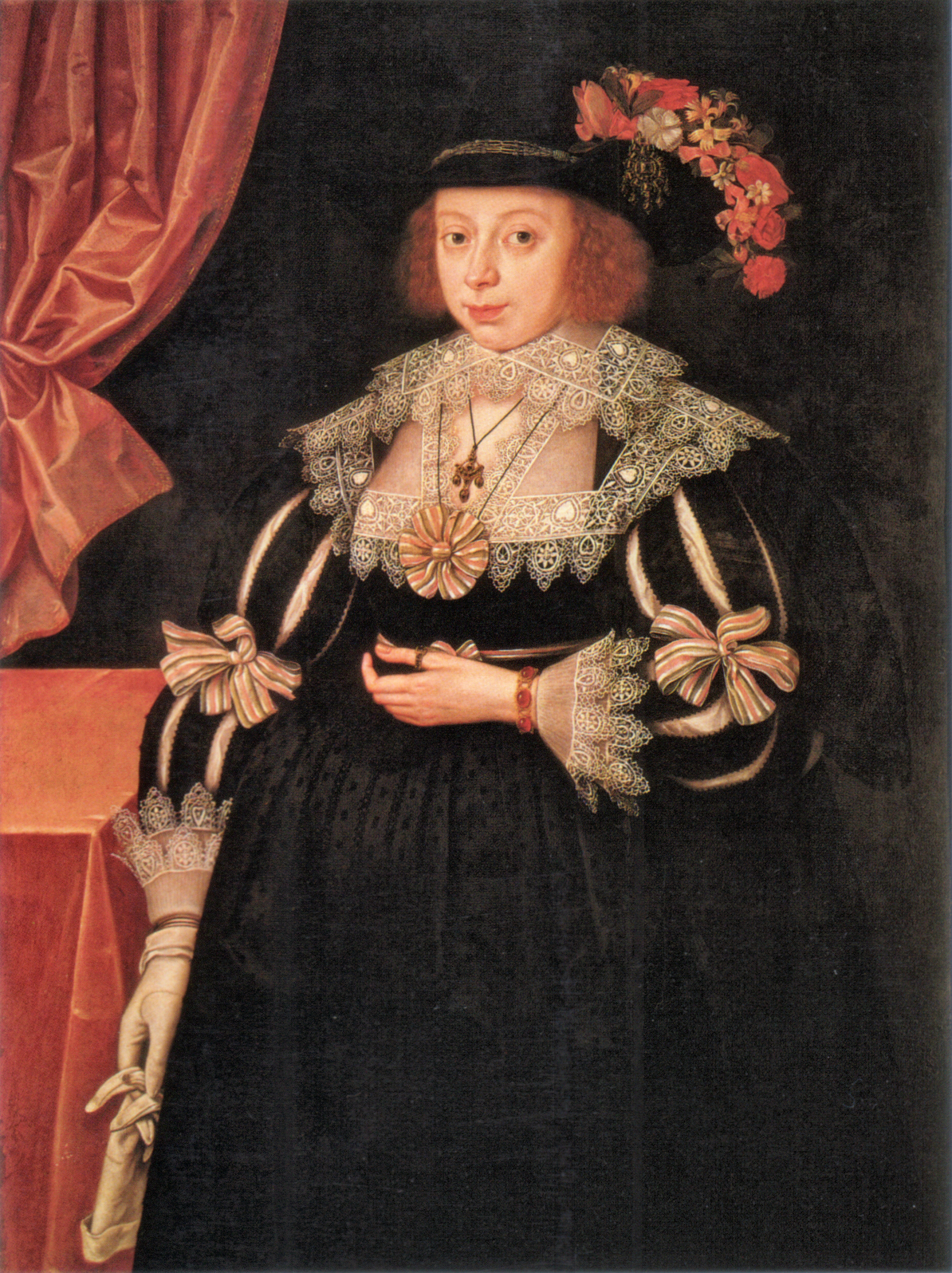
Anne Hale, Mrs Hoskins, 1629, oil on panel

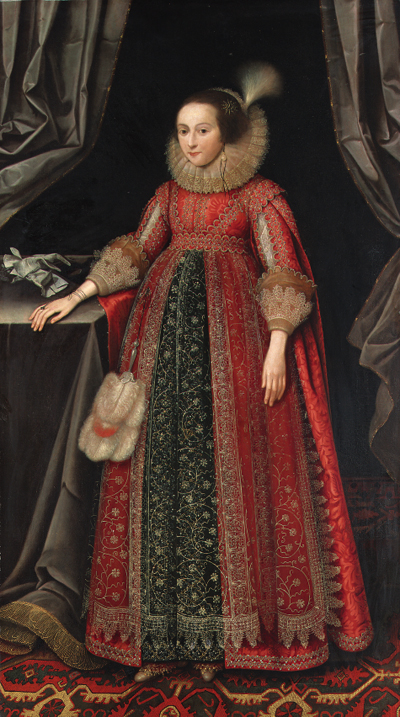
Susanna Temple sister of James Temple, 1621, oil on canvas, sold 2000

== See also ==
- Artists of the Tudor court
- Portraiture of Elizabeth I of England
