= DeMarcus =

- Gender: Male

Origin
- Origin: African-American
- Region of origin: United States

Other names
- Variant forms: Demarcus, DaMarcus, Damarcus

DeMarcus or Demarcus is a masculine given name.

Notable people with the name include:

- Demarcus Ayers (born 1994), American football player
- Demarcus Christmas (born 1995), American football player
- DeMarcus Corley (born 1974), American boxer
- DeMarcus Cousins (born 1990), American basketball player
- DeMarcus Covington (born 1989), American football coach
- DeMarcus Curry (born 1975), American football player
- Demarcus Dobbs (born 1987), American football player
- Demarcus Evans (born 1996), American baseball player
- DeMarcus Faggins (born 1979), American football player
- DaMarcus Fields (born 1998), American football player
- DeMarcus Granger (born 1986), American football player
- DeMarcus Lawrence (born 1992), American football player
- DeMarcus Love (born 1988), American football player
- DaMarcus Mitchell (born 1998), American football player
- DeMarcus Nelson (born 1985), American basketball player
- Demarcus Robinson (born 1994), American football player
- DeMarcus Van Dyke (born 1989), American football player
- DeMarcus Walker (born 1994), American football player
- DeMarcus Ware (born 1982), American football player

== See also ==
- Jamarcus, a page for people with the given name "Jamarcus"
