= Archibald Armstrong =

Court jester to James VI and I (died 1672)

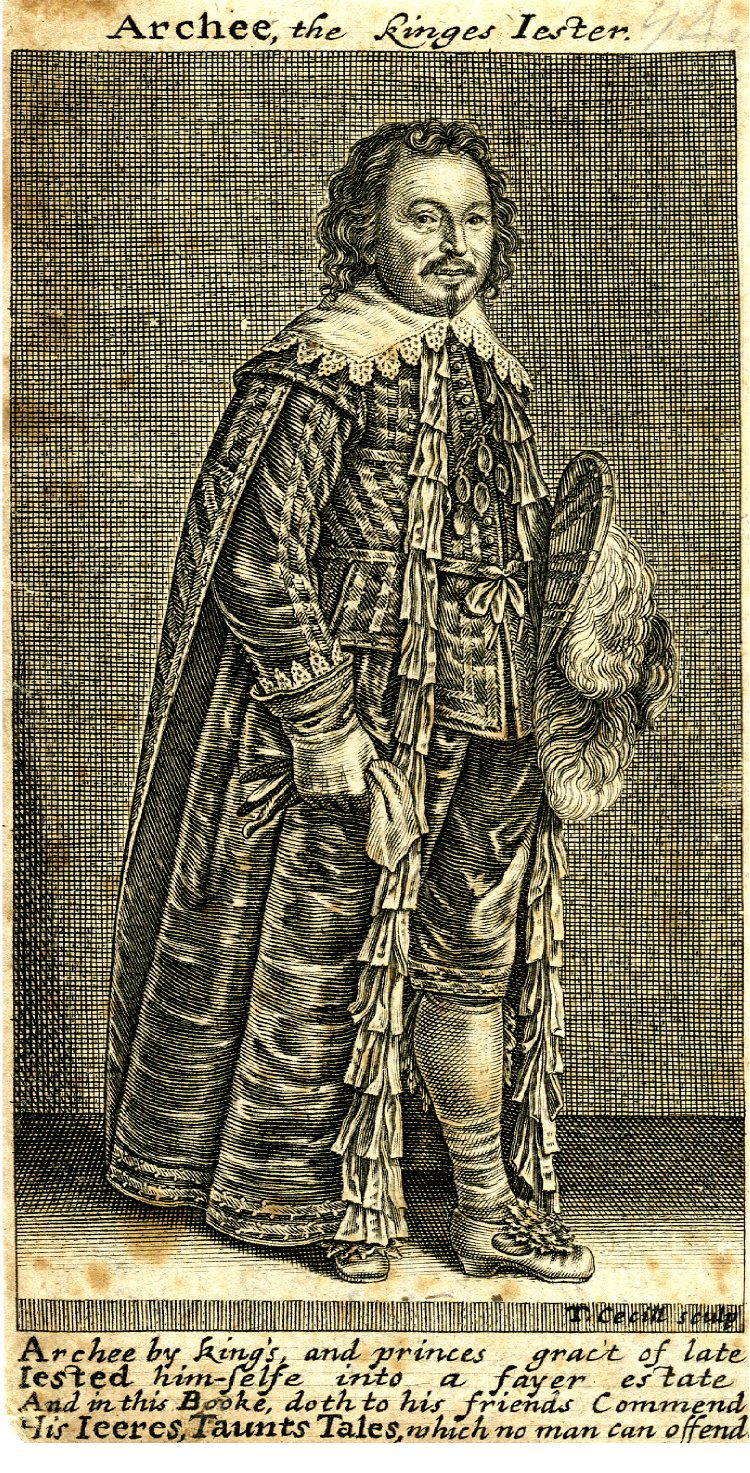
- Archibald Armstrong, engraving by Thomas Cecil
- Died: March 1672; Arthuret
- Other name: Archy
- Occupations: Sheep thief, court jester, money lender
- Years active: 1606?–1641?
- Spouses: First spouse's name unknown, Sybilla Bell

Archibald "Archy" Armstrong (died March 1672) was born in Scotland, and according to tradition first distinguished himself as a sheep thief; afterwards he entered the service of James VI and I as a court jester, with whom he became a favourite.

== At court ==
When James VI succeeded to the English throne, Armstrong was appointed court jester. His yearly fee in 1606 was £9-2s-6d. In 1611 he was granted a pension of two shillings a day. In February 1612 he was given clothes laced with silk, made by Lord Cranbourne's tailor. Armstrong had been born in Scotland and on 9 July 1612 was made a denizen of England. His influence was considerable and he was greatly courted and flattered, but his success led to him becoming presumptuous, insolent, and mischievous and was much disliked by the members of the court.

At the Newmarket races in 1612, Armstrong tried to excite jealousy between King James and Prince Henry, by pointing out how more courtiers stayed with Henry once they were parted. Thereafter Henry's friends would always toss Armstrong in a blanket when they saw him.

Armstrong attended the wedding of Princess Elizabeth and Frederick V of the Palatinate in 1613. He wore a crimson velvet coat with gold lace. Another fool at court Tom Durie was painted in a red costume with gold trim.

In May 1617 Armstrong visited Scotland with the king. Accounts of a banquet in Edinburgh call him "Archibald Armstrong his Majesties pleasant". At Aberdeen he and other courtiers including Edward Zouch, George Goring, and John Wolfgang Rumler were made burgesses of the town. That year it was reported that he had obtained a royal pension of £50 yearly for his Scottish kinsman, John of the Syde, (an Armstrong from Mangerton). The courtier and musician James Hudson thought if Armstrong, "that grave gentleman", had such influence then the Earl of Mar could do the same for him.

In August 1618 John Chamberlain wrote that "Archie the Dizzard" had been granted a lucrative monopoly on the making of clay tobacco pipes although this was incorrect. In October 1618, it was reported that "Archy the Fool" had been banished from the court for misbehaviour.

In 1623 he accompanied Prince Charles and Lord Buckingham in their royal marriage negotiations in Spain, where he was much favoured by the Spanish court. Philip IV of Spain gave him a suit and a gold chain, and, according to his own account, was granted a pension. According to James Howell, "cousin Archy" was allowed access to the Infanta with her meninas and ladies of honour. He teased them on the defeat of the Armada, and censured the conduct of the expedition to Buckingham's face. Buckingham declared he would have him hanged, to which the jester replied that "dukes had often been hanged for insolence but never fools for talking." On his return he gained some complimentary allusions from Ben Jonson by his attacks upon the Spanish marriage.

He retained his post on the accession of Charles I, and accumulated a considerable fortune, including the grant by the king of 1000 acres (4 km^{2}) in Ireland. After the death of Buckingham in 1628, whom he declared "the greatest enemy of three kings", the principal object of his dislike and rude jests was William Laud, whom he openly vilified and ridiculed.

He pronounced the following grace at Whitehall in Laud's presence: "Great praise be given to God and little laud to the devil" (Laud stood only five feet tall, and bitterly resented remarks on the subject), and after the news of the rebellion in Scotland in 1637 he greeted Laud on his way to the council chamber at Whitehall with: "Who's fool now? Does not your Grace hear the news from Stirling about the liturgy?" On Laud's complaint to the council, Armstrong was sentenced the same day "to have his coat pulled over his head and be discharged the king's service and banished the king's court."

== Later years ==
He settled in London as a money-lender, and many complaints were made to the privy council and House of Lords of his sharp practices. In 1641 on the occasion of Laud's arrest, he enjoyed a mean revenge by publishing Archy's Dream; sometimes Jester to his Majestie, but exiled the Court by Canterburie's malice. Subsequently, he resided at Arthuret in Cumberland, according to some accounts his birthplace, where he possessed an estate, and where he died in 1672, his burial taking place on 1 April.

He was twice married, his second wife being Sybilla Bell. There is no record of any legal offspring, but the baptism of a "base son" of Archibald Armstrong is entered in the parish register of 17 December 1643. A Banquet of Jests: A change of Cheare, published about 1630, a collection chiefly of dull, stale jokes, is attributed to him, and with still less reason probably A choice Banquet of Witty Jests ... Being an addition to Archee's Jests, taken out of his Closet but never published in his Lifetime (1660).

In 1651, as in the case of several royal servants and artisans, the executor of Archibald Armstrong, Philip Armstrong, was given compensation for unpaid wages by the Commonwealth Committee for the Sale of Late King's Goods.
