= Margus Põldsepp =

Estonian musician

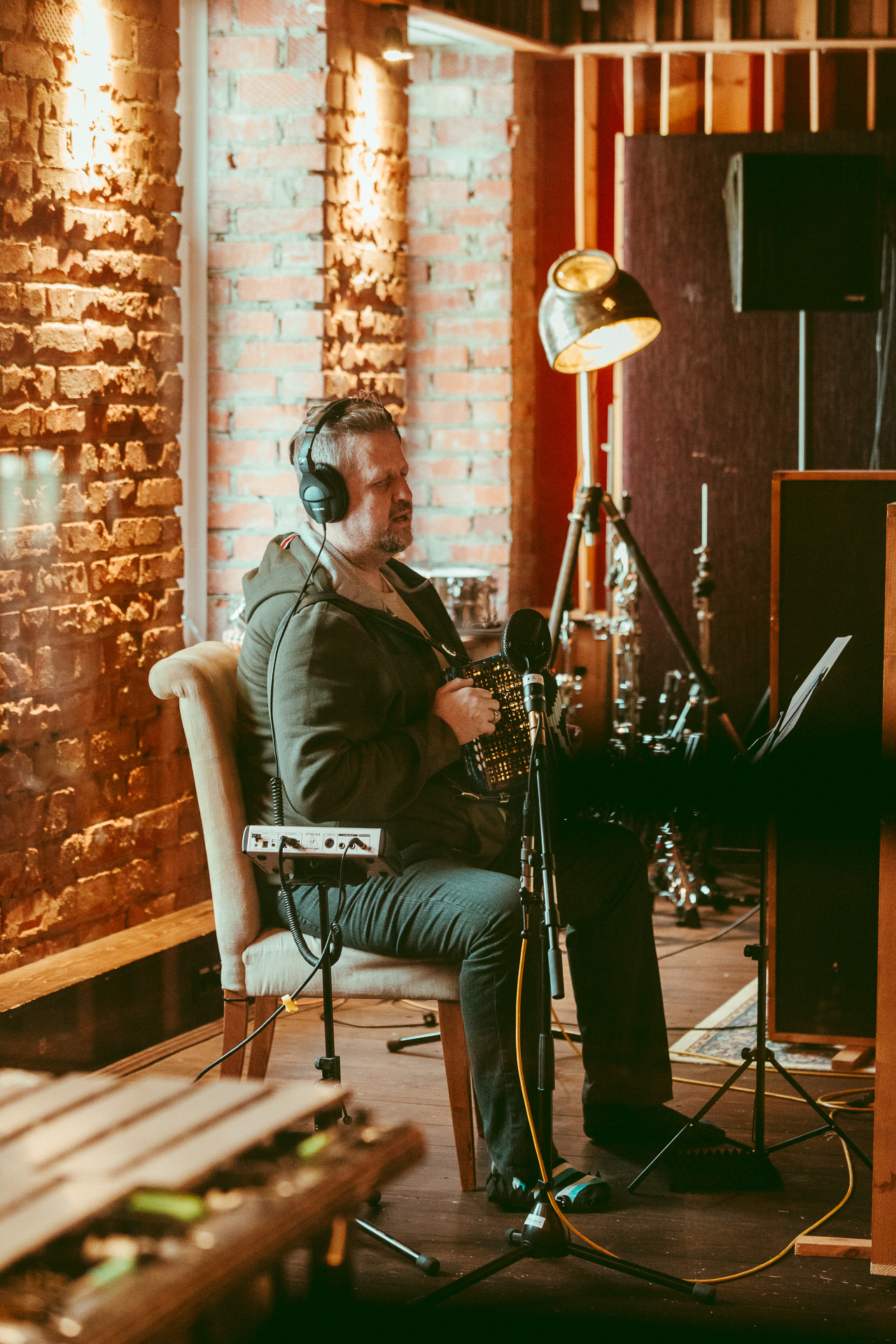
Margus Põldsepp (2023)

Margus Põldsepp (born 3 November 1969) is an Estonian musician who performs in several ensembles, including Untsakad, Lõõtsavägilased and Põldsepp ja Pojad.

Margus Põldsepp was born in Paide. He graduated from Valga Children's Music School in 1985 and Valga Gymnasium and in 1987. He has been collecting folklore since he was a student, using it in his musical work.

From 1995 until 2002, he was the musical director of the Ugala theatre in Viljandi.

He ran for the VIII Riigikogu in 1995 on the list of the Fourth Forces of the Electoral Union formed by the Estonian Greens and the Estonian Royalist Party, but was not elected.

Põldsepp has been the director of the Karksi-Nuia Music School since 2007, supervising folk music ensembles in Karksi-Nuia, the best known of which is Tuulepuu.

He is a collaborator of the Estonian Legion Club.

He has taught accordion at the Viljandi Culture Academy and the Estonian Traditional Music Center.
