= Markus Kranig =

German politician (born 1988)

Member of the Hamburg Parliament
- Incumbent
- Assumed office 26 March 2025
- Constituency: Rahlstedt

Personal details
- Born: 1988 (age 37–38)
- Party: Christian Democratic Union (since 2004)

Markus Kranig (born 1988) is a German politician serving as a member of the Hamburg Parliament since 2025. From 2024 to 2025, he was a borough councillor of Wandsbek.
