= Marcus (Manichean) =

4th century Egyptian Manichean missionary in Spain

Marcus also known as Marcus of Memphis was an influential Manichaean missionary active in Spain in the 4th century AD. Marcus was a native Egyptian from the city of Memphis. He had two well-known students, Agape, a rich and well-established matron of 4th century Hispania, and Elpidius, who later went on to influence some of the ideas of Priscillian.
