= Margus Tammekivi =

Estonian politician (1956–2026)

Margus Tammekivi (23 January 1956 – 2 July 2026) was an Estonian lawyer, politician and sports figure. He was a member of XI Riigikogu.

== Life and career ==
Tammekivi was born in Kõpu on 23 January 1956. After graduating from secondary school in Karksi-Nuia in 1974, he attended Tartu State University, Department of Law, graduating in 1979.

He worked in Pärnu as an investigator, prosecutor and lawyer. He was a chairman of the Pärnu Council from 1989 until 1993, and again from 2002 to 2005. Tammekivi was the deputy mayor of Pärnu from 2000 until 2002 and again from 2005–2007. In 2007, he was an alternate member of the XI Riigikogu, representing the Estonian Centre Party.

Tammekivi died on 2 July 2026, at the age of 70.
