= Marcus Henry =

Marcus Henry can refer to:

- Marcus Henry (offensive lineman) (born 1993), American football center
- Marcus Henry (wide receiver) (born 1986), American former wide receiver
