= Marcus (informant) =

Pseudonym used by a former ASIO informant

Marcus is the pseudonym a former Australian Security Intelligence Organisation (ASIO) informant who claimed that both of the alleged 14 December 2025 Bondi Beach shooting gunmen (Sajid Akram and Naveed Akram) had been supporters of ISIS since 2019.

== Recruitment ==
According to ABC journalist Sean Rubinsztein-Dunlop, Marcus was recruited from his "home country" by ASIO; he already had contacts with the intelligence agencies of the country where he was living. ASIO were looking for an Arabic speaker who could infiltrate a group of ISIS supporters in Sydney. The group he infiltrated was led by a controversial preacher Wissam Haddad (also known as William Haddad and Abu Ousayd). Marcus alleges that Haddad encouraged his youngest followers to carry out violence, but said they should not tell anyone about their plans.

=== 2023 dispute with ASIO ===
In 2023, ASIO withdrew its support for Marcus's permanent residency and Marcus left Australia.

== 2024 Wakeley church stabbing ==
After the 2024 Wakeley church stabbing, Marcus contacted ABC journalist Sean Rubinsztein‑Dunlop.

=== April 2025 Four Corners documentary ===
In April 2025 Marcus appeared on Four Corners, "breaking his cover to expose the activities of a notorious preacher at the centre of Australia's resurgent pro-Islamic State (IS) network". In an April 2023 interview with the ABC, Marcus claimed that if his warnings had been followed, the 2024 Wakeley church stabbing could have been prevented.

== 2025 Bondi Beach shooting ==
After the 14 December 2025 Bondi Beach shooting, Marcus claimed that the attack could have been prevented.

=== 2026 dispute with ASIO ===
Marcus has claimed that he warned ASIO that the alleged Bondi Beach gunmen were radicalised before the attack. ASIO disputed the allegations against both ASIO and the Akrams, saying that Marcus had mixed up Naveed with a different person, and therefore the associated claims are untrue. Marcus denied that he could have misidentified Naveed: "I strongly deny ASIO's allegation that I ever misidentified Naveed Akram, someone I met on a regular face-to-face basis over many years."

== Personal life ==
ABC News described Marcus as being from a "country in the Middle East". In an interview with Four Corners Marcus described himself as a Muslim and a Palestinian refugee.

== See also ==
- Australia–Palestine relations
- Curveball (informant) – Iraqi defector
- Immigration to Australia
- Terrorism in Australia § July 2019 in Western Sydney
