= Jamarcus =

JaMarcus (or Ja'Marcus, J'Marcus) is a given name. Notable people with the given name include:

- Ja'Marcus Bradley (born 1996), American football player
- Ja'Marcus Ingram (born 1997), American football player
- Jamarcus Nelson (born 1992), American football player
- JaMarcus Russell (born 1985), American football player
- JaMarcus Shephard (born 1983), American football coach
- J'Marcus Webb (born 1988), American football player

== See also ==
- DeMarcus, given name
