= Markus Nissa Weiss =

Hungarian advocate and author

Markus Nissa Weiss was a Hungarian advocate and author of the Reform Judaism movement that started in the late 18th century, with the advent of Jewish emancipation and acculturation in Central Europe. The easing of traditional patterns and norms from the population around them, led to debates in the European Jewish community regarding how the community itself might embrace the possibilities for change under these new circumstances.

In 1792, Weiss had a small business at Pest, and in 1794 he leased an estate near Munkács, where his oppressions gave rise to complaints among the Galician Jews. In 1802 he published a pamphlet entitled "Der Jude wie Er Ist," in which he pleaded with the Jews to accept the ideas of Reform. This work caused him to be highly criticized by the Hungarian Jews; and in order to defend his person and ideas he issued (Vienna, 1803) another pamphlet, which was entitled "Der Bedrängte Markus Nissa Weiss an die Menschen." Finding, however, that he could not overcome the antagonistic attitude of his coreligionists, he embraced Christianity.

After his conversion, Weiss published his "In Neuerfundenen Tabellen Gegründete Praktische Vortheile der Rechnungskunst," Buda, 1805; "Der Missverstandene Text und dessen Wahrer Sinn," ib. 1806. He has further published "Unparteiische Betrachtungen über das Grosse Jüdische Sanhedrin zu Paris" (ib. 1807).
