= Márquez =

Márquez or Marquez is a surname of Spanish origin, meaning "son of Marcos or Marcus". Its Portuguese equivalent is Marques.

It should not be confused with the surname Marqués, also of Spanish origin.

== People ==
- Adrian Garcia Marquez (born 1973), American sportscaster
- Alfredo Chavez Marquez (1922–2014), American judge
- Alejandro Márquez (born 1991), Chilean footballer
- Álex Márquez (born 1996), Spanish motorcycle racer
- Alexis Márquez Rivas, Venezuelan swimmer (born 1989)
- Alfonso Márquez (born 1972), Mexican Major League Baseball umpire
- Alfonso Marquez (basketball) (1938–2020), Filipino basketball player
- Alfonso Márquez de la Plata (1933–2014), Chilean politician
- Ana Marquez-Greene, victim of the Sandy Hook Elementary School shooting
- Andrés Leonardo Márquez (born 1984), Uruguayan footballer
- Ángel Márquez (born 2000), Mexican footballer
- Anna Dominique Marquez-Lim Coseteng (born 1952), Filipina politician
- Antonio García Márquez (born 1989), Spanish footballer
- Antonio Márquez Ramírez (1936–2013), Mexican football referee
- Arturo Márquez (born 1950), Mexican composer
- Baltasar Márquez (born 1967), Spanish rower
- Bartolome Blanco Marquez (1914–1936), Spanish martyr
- Bartolomé de Jesús Masó Márquez (1830–1907), Cuban politician
- Bernardo Márquez García, Puerto Rican mayor
- Berta Arocena de Martínez Márquez (1899–1956), Cuban activist
- Bradley Marquez (born 1992), American football player
- Brailyn Márquez (born 1999), Dominican Major League Baseball pitcher
- Carlos Labbé Márquez (1876–1941), Chilean bishop
- Carlos Márquez Sterling (1898–1991), Cuban politician
- Carolina Márquez (born 1975), Colombian-Italian musician
- Celina Márquez (born 1999), Salvadoran swimmer
- Cristóbal Márquez (born 1984), Spanish footballer
- Daniel Márquez (born 1987), Mexican footballer
- Daniel Razo Marquez (born 1950), Mexican footballer
- Darina Márquez (born 1980), Mexican musician
- David Márquez (born 1977), Spanish racewalker
- David Marquez (comics), American comic book artist
- David W. Márquez, former attorney general of Alaska
- Dayron Márquez (born 1983), Colombian javelin thrower
- Domingo Márquez, Argentine actor
- Edith Márquez (born 1973), Mexican singer
- Eduardo Márquez Talledo (1902–1975), Peruvian composer
- Elías Cárdenas Márquez (born 1936), Mexican politician
- Emilio González Márquez (born 1960), Mexican politician
- Emilio Márquez, American drummer
- Emilio Z. Marquez (born 1941), Filipino bishop
- Empoy Marquez (born 1981), Filipino actor
- Enrique Macaya Márquez (born 1934), Argentine sports journalist
- Enrique Márquez Climent (born 1989), Spanish footballer
- Enrique Márquez Jaramillo (born 1950), Mexican poet
- Enrique Marquez Jr., accomplice in the 2015 San Bernardino mass shooting
- Esperanza Márquez (born 1973), Spanish rower
- Esteban Márquez de Velasco (1652–1696), Spanish painter
- Evaristo Márquez (1939–2013), Colombian actor
- Evaristo Márquez Contreras (1929–1996), Spanish sculptor
- Favio Márquez (born 1974), Argentine footballer
- Felipe González Márquez (born 1942), Spanish prime minister
- Félix Márquez (born 1947), Venezuelan boxer
- Fernando Andrés Márquez (born 1987), Argentine footballer
- Fernando Márquez de la Plata (1740–1818), Chilean president
- Fernando Márquez Joya, Spanish painter
- Fernando Yunes Márquez (born 1982), Mexican politician
- Floria Márquez (1950–2025), Venezuelan singer
- Francia Márquez (born 1981), Vice President of Colombia
- Francisco Márquez, Mexican military cadet
- Francisco Márquez Tinoco (born 1960), Mexican politician
- Francisco Menéndez Márquez, Spanish Florida colonial governor
- Frank Chamizo Marquez (born 1992), Cuban-Italian wrestler
- Gabriel García Márquez (1927–2014), Colombian Nobel prize-winning author
- Gabriel Márquez (born 1956), Mexican footballer
- Generoso Márquez (born 1952), Cuban basketball player
- Germán Márquez (born 1995), Venezuelan Major League Baseball pitcher
- Gonzalo Márquez (1940–1984), Venezuelan Major League Baseball first baseman
- Gorka Márquez (born 1990), Spanish dancer
- Graciela Márquez (born 1978), Venezuelan volleyball player
- Graciela Márquez Colín, Mexican economist
- Guillermo Márquez Lizalde (born 1961), Mexican politician
- Herbys Márquez (born 1980), Venezuelan weightlifter
- Hernán Márquez (born 1988), Mexican boxer
- Horacio Sánchez Marquez (born 1953), Mexican footballer
- Hudson Marquez, American artist
- Isidro Márquez (born 1965), Mexican Major League Baseball player
- Iván Márquez (born 1955), Colombian guerrilla leader and FARC member
- Iván Márquez Álvarez (born 1994), Spanish footballer
- Iván Márquez (volleyball) (born 1981), Venezuelan volleyball player
- Javi Márquez (born 1986), Spanish footballer
- Jean Márquez (born 1985), Guatemalan footballer
- Jeff Marquez (born 1984), American Major League Baseball pitcher
- Jesús Márquez Rodríguez (born 1966), Puerto Rican mayor
- Joey Marquez (born 1957), Filipino actor and politician
- John Márquez, California politician
- John Marquez (actor) (born 1970), British actor
- Jorge Eduardo Márquez (born 1989), Mexican footballer
- Jorge L. Márquez Pérez (born 1960), Puerto Rican mayor
- Jorge Márquez Gómez (born 1988), Venezuelan footballer
- José Alexis Márquez Restrepo, Venezuelan footballer (born 1981)
- José Antonio Franco Márquez (born 1998), Spanish footballer
- José Ignacio de Márquez (1793–1880), Colombian politician
- José Jesús Márquez (born 1973), Spanish taekwondo athlete
- Jose Midas Marquez (born 1966), Filipino attorney
- José Victoriano Huerta Márquez (1850–1916), Mexican president
- Joseph Marquez (born 1991), professional Super Smash Bros player
- Josue Marquez (1946–2018) Spanish boxer
- Juan Márquez, (1565–1621) Spanish writer
- Juan Albano Pereira Márquez (1728–1790), Portuguese merchant
- Juan Carlos Márquez (c. 1971–2019), Spanish-Venezuelan businessman
- Juan Carlos Muñoz Márquez (born 1950), Mexican politician
- Juan Manuel Márquez (born 1973), Mexican professional boxer
- Juan Márquez Cabrera, Spanish colonial governor
- Juan Menéndez Márquez, Spanish Florida colonial governor
- Juan Pérez Márquez (born 1974), Spanish handball player
- Julian Marquez (born 1990), American UFC fighter
- Karel Marquez (born 1986), Filipina actress
- Kathrin Barboza Marquez, Bolivian biologist
- Kenny Marquez, member of the American band Renegade
- Laureano Márquez (born 1963), Spanish-Venezuelan humorist
- Lea Márquez Peterson (born 1970), American politician
- Leonardo Márquez (1820–1913), Mexican general
- Linda Esperanza Marquez, California community activist and namesake of Linda Esperanza Marquez High School
- Liz María Márquez, Venezuelan politician
- Lucas Márquez (footballer, born 1988), Argentine footballer
- Lucas Márquez (footballer, born 1990), Argentine footballer
- Luis Márquez (1925–1988), Puerto Rican Major League Baseball player
- Luis Alberto Márquez (born 1995), Mexican footballer
- Luz Márquez (born 1935), Spanish actress
- Manuel Márquez Roca (born 1968), Spanish footballer
- Manuel Márquez Sterling (1872–1934), Cuban politician
- Manuela Antonia Márquez García-Saavedra (1844-1890), Peruvian writer, poet, composer pianist
- Marc Márquez (born 1993), Spanish motorcycle racer
- Marcos Márquez (born 1977), Spanish footballer
- Maria Alejandra Marquez, wife of musician Tico Torres
- María de los Ángeles Cano Márquez (1887–1969), Colombian activist
- Maria Stella Márquez (born 1937), Colombian beauty queen
- Mariano Marquez (born 1968), Puerto Rican boxer
- Marisa Marquez (born 1978), American legislator
- Martin Marquez (born 1964), British actor
- Mauricio Márquez (born 2001), Venezuelan footballer
- Melanie Marquez (born 1964), Filipina beauty queen, Miss International 1979
- Melissa Márquez (born 1996), Mexican rower
- Miguel Ángel J. Márquez Ruiz (born 1942), Mexican veterinarian
- Miguel Marquez, American news correspondent
- Miguel Márquez Márquez (born 1968), Mexican politician
- Monica Márquez (born 1969), American judge
- Nelly Márquez Zapata (born 1964), Mexican politician
- Nicomedes Márquez Joaquín (1917–2004), Filipino writer
- Ofelia Márquez Huitzil, Mexican artist
- Pablo Márquez, Argentine guitarist
- Pablo Marquez (born 1973), Ecuadorean wrestler
- Paloma Márquez (born 1986), Mexican actress
- Paula Contreras Márquez (1911–2008), Spanish writer
- Paz Márquez-Benítez, Filipina writer
- Pedro Menéndez Márquez, Spanish conquistador
- Pedro Pablo Pérez Márquez (born 1977), Cuban cyclist
- Pío García-Escudero Márquez (born 1952), Spanish architect
- Pompeyo Márquez (1922–2017), Venezuelan politician
- Rafael Márquez (born 1979), Mexican footballer
- Rafael Márquez (boxer) (born 1975), Mexican professional boxer
- Rafael Márquez Esqueda (1947–2002), Mexican footballer
- Rafael Márquez Lugo (born 1981), Mexican footballer
- Rafael Ángel Rondón Márquez, Venezuelan writer
- Ramona Marquez (born 2001), English child actress
- Ranulfo Márquez Hernández (born 1951), Mexican politician
- Raúl Márquez (born 1971), American boxer
- Ramón Zaydín y Márquez Sterling (c. 1895–1968), Cuban politician
- Raymond Márquez a.k.a. Spanish Raymond Márquez or Spanish Raymond (born 1930), American gangster who ran the Harlem numbers racket
- Rene Marquez (1919–1979), Puerto Rican writer
- Rey Marquez (c. 1932–2018), Filipino sports executive
- Ricardo Márquez (born 1997), Colombian footballer
- Richie Marquez (born 1992), American soccer player
- Roberta Marquez, Brazilian ballet dancer
- Roberto Márquez (field hockey), Argentine field hockey player
- Roberto Márquez (painter), Mexican painter
- Rocío Márquez (born 1985), Spanish flamenco singer
- Rosemary Márquez (born 1968), American judge
- Salvador Márquez (born 1950), Mexican footballer
- Salvador Márquez Lozornio (born 1956), Mexican politician
- Sandra Marquez, American actor
- Sheila Márquez (born 1985), Spanish fashion model
- Soraya Marquez, American street artist Indie184
- Teejay Marquez (born 1993), Filipino actor
- Teresita Marquez (born 1992), Filipina model and actress, Reina Hispanoamericana 2017
- Tintín Márquez (born 1962), Spanish footballer
- Tomás Menéndez Márquez, Spanish Florida colonial official
- Valeria Márquez (gymnast) (born 2004), Spanish rhythmic gymnastics
- Vanessa Marquez (1968–2018), American actress
- Vanessa Rubio Márquez (born 1972), Mexican politician
- Vernon Oswald Marquez, Trinidadian businessman
- Victoria Méndez Márquez (born 1961), Mexican politician
- Victorino Márquez Bustillos (1858–1941), Venezuelan former president
- Walter Márquez (1936–2012), Uruguayan basketball player
- William Márquez Uzcátegui, member of the Venezuelan boy band Los Chamos
- Yénier Márquez (born 1979), Cuban footballer
- Zia Marquez (born 1992), Filipina actress

== Fictional characters ==
- Chuny Marquez, character from the television show ER
- Diego Marquez, main character of Go, Diego, Go! and the cousin of Dora the Explorer
- Dora Marquez, the main protagonist of the television series Dora the Explorer
- Eva Marquez, main character of New Amsterdam (2008 TV series)
- Gabrielle (Marquez) Solis, main character of Desperate Housewives
- Juanita Marquez, character in the novel Snow Crash
- Lea Marquez, character from the soap opera All My Children
- Lorena Marquez, Aquagirl in Aquaman by DC Comics
- Mandy Marquez, character from the BBC soap opera Doctors
- Mimi Marquez, central character in Rent (musical)
- Samantha (Sam) Marquez, main character of Las Vegas (TV series)

== See also ==
- Menéndez Márquez (disambiguation), family of Spanish Florida colonial officials
