= Evaristo =

Evaristo is both a given name and a surname. Notable people with the name include:

== Given name ==
- Evaristo Avalos (born 1933), Mexican equestrian
- Evaristo Barrera (1911–1982), Argentine football striker
- Evaristo Baschenis (1617–1677), Italian Baroque painter
- Evaristo Beccalossi (born 1956), Italian footballer
- Evaristo Breccia (1876-1967), Italian egyptologist
- Evaristo Carazo (1821–1889), President of Nicaragua
- Evaristo Carriego (1883–1912), Argentine poet
- Evaristo Carvalho (born 1942), President and former prime minister of São Tomé and Príncipe
- Evaristo Conrado Engelberg (1853–1932), Brazilian mechanical engineer and inventor
- Evaristo Coronado (born 1960), Costa Rican soccer striker
- Evaristo Costa (born 1976), Brazilian journalist
- Evaristo da Veiga (1799–1837), Brazilian poet, journalist, politician and bookseller
- Evaristo de Chirico (1841–1905), Italian-Greek engineer
- Evaristo de Churruca y Brunet (1841–1917), Spanish engineer
- Evaristo de Macedo (born 1933), former Brazilian footballer
- Evaristo de Moraes Filho, Brazilian lawyer
- Evaristo Endanco (born 1896), Italian racing cyclist
- Evaristo Felice Dall'Abaco (1675–1742), Italian composer and violinist
- Evaristo Fernández Blanco (1902–1993), Spanish composer
- Evaristo Frisoni (born 1907), Italian professional football player
- Evaristo Garbani-Nerini (1867–1944), Swiss politician
- Evaristo Gherardi (1663–1700), Italian actor and playwright
- Evaristo Iglesias (1925–2005), Cuban sprinter
- Evaristo Isasi (born 1955), former Paraguayan football striker
- Evaristo Lucidi (1866–1929), Italian Catholic Cardinal
- Evaristo Manú (born 1982), Portuguese football player
- Evaristo Marc Chengula (1941–2018), Tanzanian Roman Catholic bishop
- Evaristo Márquez (1939–2013), Colombian actor and herdsman
- Evaristo Márquez Contreras (1929–1996), Spanish sculptor
- Evaristo Martelo Paumán (1850–1928), Spanish aristocrat, writer and politician
- Evaristo Mazzón (born 1960), Uruguayan boxer
- Evaristo Merino (1868–1930), Chilean Mayor of Pichilemu
- Evaristo Muñoz (1684–1737), Spanish Baroque painter
- Evaristo Nugkuag (born 1950), Peruvian activist
- Evaristo Oliva (born 1945), former Guatemalan cyclist
- Evaristo Ortega Zárate (disappeared 2010), Mexican journalist
- Evaristo Ortíz (born 1960), Dominican Republic sprinter
- Evaristo Pérez de Castro (1778–1849), Spanish politician and diplomat
- Evaristo Piza (born 1972), Brazilian football manager
- Evaristo Porras Ardila, Colombian drug lord
- Evaristo Prendes (born 1934), Argentine fencer
- Evaristo Ribera Chevremont (1890–1976), Puerto Rican poet
- Evaristo Rocha, 7th President of Nicaragua
- Evaristo "Tito" Rubio (1902–1938), Cuban American mobster
- Evaristo San Cristóval (1848–1900), Peruvian painter, illustrator, and engraver
- Evaristo Sourdis Juliao (1905–1970), Colombian lawyer and diplomat
- Evaristo Viñuales Larroy (1913–1939), Aragonese teacher and anarchist

== Surname ==
- Alberto Evaristo Ginastera (1916–1983), Argentinian composer
- Bernardine Evaristo (born 1959), British author
- Carlos Evaristo, Portuguese Canadian historian, archaeologist and author
- Conceição Evaristo (born 1946), Brazilian writer
- Diego Cristiano Evaristo (born 1992), known as Diego Pituca, Brazilian footballer
- Félix Evaristo Mejía (1866–1945), Dominican writer, diplomat, and educator
- Jesús Evaristo Casariego Fernández-Noriega (1912–1990), Spanish writer and publisher
- José Evaristo Corrales Macías, Mexican politician
- José Evaristo Uriburu (1831–1914), President of Argentina
- Juan Evaristo (1902–1978), Argentine footballer
- Macaé Evaristo (born 1965), Brazilian teacher, social worker and politician
- Mario Evaristo (1908–1993), Argentine footballer
- Mario Evaristo Leguizamón Martínez (born 1982), Uruguayan football player
- Paulo Evaristo Arns (1921–2016), Cardinal Archbishop Emeritus of São Paulo
- Ramón Evaristo (1909–1990), Spanish bandleader and violinist
- Shaun Evaristo, Filipino-American professional dancer and choreographer

== See also ==
- Pope Evaristus
- Évariste (disambiguation)
- Everest (disambiguation)
- Praia do Evaristo
