= Marques (surname) =

Portuguese-language surname

- Current region: Portugal, Brazil
- Etymology: Portuguese patronymic meaning: Son of Marcos
- Origin: Portugal

Marques is a Portuguese language surname. Origin: Germanic patronymic, meaning son of Marcus (Marcos).

== People ==
=== Portugal ===
- Ademar Marques (born 1959), professional footballer
- Almerindo Marques (1939–2021), businessman and politician
- André Marques (born 1984), film director and screenwriter
- André Marques (born 1987), professional footballer
- António Henrique de Oliveira Marques (1933–2007), historian
- António Marques Mendes (1934–2015), lawyer and politician
- Armando Marques (born 1937), sports shooter
- Armando Marques Guedes (born 1952), social scientist, anthropologist and diplomat
- Carlos Marques (born 1983), professional footballer
- Fernanda Marques (born 1966), long-distance runner
- Filipe Marques (born 1998), paratriathlete
- Francisco da Silva Marques (1905–1968), footballer
- Frederico Marques (born 1986), professional tennis coach
- Jaime Silvério Marques (1915–1986), military officer, Governor of Macau between 1959 and 1962
- Joana Marques Vidal (born 1955), lawyer
- João Marques (born 2002), professional footballer
- João Marques de Oliveira (1853–1927), painter
- José António Marques (1822–1884), physician, founder of the Portuguese Red Cross
- José Marques (born 1967), wrestler
- José Marques da Silva (1869–1947), architect
- Lourenço Marques, trader and explorer in the 16th century
- Luís Marques Mendes (born 1957), politician
- Manuel Marques (1917–1987), footballer
- Maria Manuel Leitão Marques (born 1952), politician
- Margarida Marques (born 1954), politician
- Martim Marques (born 2004), professional footballer
- Miguel Marques (born 1963), professional footballer
- Nuno Marques (born 1970), tennis player
- Rui Marques (born 1972 or 1973), Formula One race director
- Sérgio Marques (born 1957), politician
- Susana Moreira Marques (born 1976), journalist and author
- Pedro Marques (born 1976), politician
- Pedro Marques (born 18 March 1988), professional footballer
- Pedro Marques (born 31 March 1988), professional footballer
- Pedro Marques (born April 1988), professional footballer
- Vanessa Marques (born 1996), footballer

=== Brazil ===
- Anderson Marques (born 1983), footballer
- Anderson Luís de Azevedo Rodrigues Marques (born 1987), footballer
- André Marques (born 1975), jazz pianist
- André Marques (born 1979), actor and television presenter
- Armando Marques (1930 – 2014), football referee
- Ary Marques (born 1955), football player and manager
- Binho Marques (born 1962), politician
- Cláudio Marques (born 1950), footballer
- Dênis Marques (born 1981), football striker
- Edson Marques (born 1982), futsal player
- Fernando Codá Marques (born 1979), mathematician
- Gabriel Marques (born 1988), footballer
- Guilherme Marques (born 1969), beach volleyball player
- Iorlando Pereira Marques Filho (born 1985), footballer
- José Roberto Marques (1945–2016), footballer
- Lucas Marques (born 1988), footballer
- Maria Marques (born 1976), water polo player
- Priscila Marques (born 1978), judo athlete
- Renan Marques (born 1983), football player
- Ricardo Marques (born 1979), professional football referee
- Rodrigo Peters Marques (born 1985) footballer
- Tarso Marques (born 1976), racing driver
- Vinícius Gageiro Marques (1989–2006), known as Yoñlu, singer-songwriter
- Wlamir Marques (1937–2025), basketball player and coach
- Yane Marques (born 1984), modern pentathlon athlete

=== Other countries ===
- Antoine Vermorel-Marques (born 1993), French politician
- David Marques (1932–2010), English rugby player
- Hugo Marques (born 1986), Angolan footballer
- Rui Marques (born 1977), retired Angolan footballer

== See also ==
- Marques (disambiguation)
- Márquez
