= Jorge Márquez =

Jorge Márquez may refer to:

- Jorge L. Márquez Pérez (born 1960), Puerto Rican politician
- Jorge Márquez (footballer, born 1988), Venezuelan football midfielder
- Jorge Márquez (footballer, born 1990), Mexican football forward
