= Évariste =

Évariste may refer to:

- Alexandre-Évariste Fragonard (1780–1850), French painter and sculptor
- Courcelles-Saint-Évariste, municipality in Canada
- Évariste Boshab (born 1956), Congolese politician
- Évariste Carpentier (1845–1922), Belgian painter
- Evariste Djimasdé, Chadian footballer
- Évariste Galois (1811–1832), French mathematician
- Évariste Régis Huc (1813–1860), French missionary traveller
- Évariste Jonchère (1892–1956), French sculptor
- Évariste Kimba (1926–1966), Congolese journalist and politician
- Pierre-Évariste Leblanc, KCMG (1853–1918), Quebec Conservative Party leader
- Évariste Vital Luminais (1822–1896), French painter
- Évariste Ndayishimiye (born 1968), Burundian politician
- Évariste de Parny (1753–1814), French writer
- Évariste Prat (1904–1970), French cross-country skier
- Évariste, 2015 novel by François-Henri Désérable
- Évariste Warlomont (1820–1891), Belgian ophthalmologist and physician

== See also ==
- Pope Evaristus
- Evaristo
- Everest (disambiguation)
- Praia do Evaristo
