= Lucas Marques =

Lucas Marques may refer to:

- Lucas Marques (footballer, born 1988), Brazilian football right-back
- Lucas Marques (footballer, born 1995), Brazilian football defensive midfielder

== See also ==
- Lucas Márquez (disambiguation)
