= Miguel Ángel J. Márquez Ruiz =

Mexican veterinarian (1942–2026)

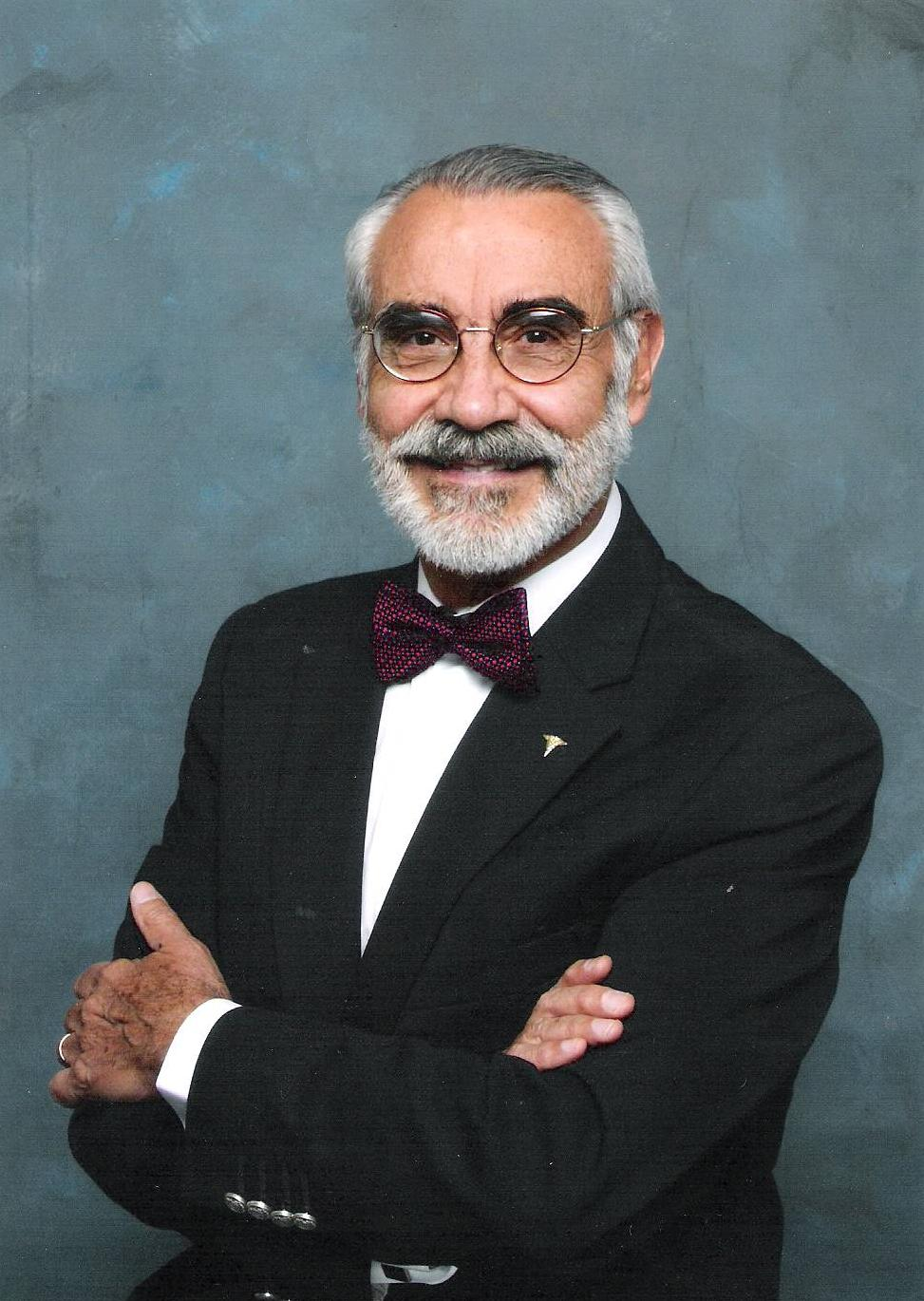
- Márquez Ruiz in 2012
- Born: Miguel Ángel Jacinto Márquez Ruiz; September 11, 1942; Mexico City, Mexico
- Died: May 4, 2026 (aged 83); Guadalajara, Mexico
- Education: National Autonomous University of Mexico
- Spouse: Maria Teresa Tapia
- Children: Miguel Ángel and Diego Andrés
- Scientific career
- Fields: Pathology, virology

Miguel Ángel Jacinto Márquez Ruiz (Note: In this Mexican name, the surname is Márquez and the second or maternal family name is Ruiz.) (September 11, 1942 – May 4, 2026) was a Mexican veterinarian with over 50 years of professional practice, who received international recognition for his contributions to veterinary medicine. He taught at the Faculty of Veterinary Medicine of the National Autonomous University of Mexico (UNAM) and carried out intensive work through the years in the areas of clinical pathology, virology, immunology and avian epidemiology. Márquez died on May 4, 2026, at the age of 83.

== Education ==
- Graduated from the Veterinary Medicine School. National Autonomous University of Mexico. Mexico City. 1960–1964
- Specialization Degree in Poultry Viral Diseases at the University of Liverpool, England in 1968
- Master of Veterinary Sciences at l' École de Medicine Vétérinaire d'Alfort. Paris, France. 1972–1974
- Diplomate in Business Administration. Panamerican Institute for High Business Direction. Mexico. 1992
- Diplomate of the American College of Poultry Veterinarians. Baltimore, Maryland. 1998
- PhD in History and its Sources. Faculty of Philosophy and Letters, University of Leon, Spain. CUM LAUDE. 2006

== Memberships ==
- Member of the American Association of Avian Pathologists (AAAP) in 1969
- Founding Member in 1970 and twice Chairman of the Mexican Association of Poultry Veterinarians/ANECA in 1975 & 1981
- Founder and President of the Mexican Society for the History of Veterinary Medicine. Mexico. 1987–2001
- Member of the Mexican Society for the History and Philosophy of the Medicine in 1993
- Academic Numerary Member of the Mexican Academy of Veterinary Medicine (AVM) in 1997
- Member of the Societé Française d'Histoire de la Medecine et des Sciences Veterinaires. Paris, 2005
- Correspondent Academic Member of Academy of Veterinary Sciences of Catalonia. Barcelona, 2008
- Correspondent Academic Member of Royal Academy of Veterinary Sciences of Spain. Madrid, 2009

== Awards and recognition ==
- National Award "Goat of Picasso" given by the Mexican Association of Caprine Practitioners. Mexico, 1992
- National Award "ANECA" given by the Mexican Association of Poultry Specialists. Cancun, 1996
- Appointed "Veterinarian of the Year" by the Veterinary Medicine College of Jalisco. Guadalajara, 2006
- Medal to the "Academical Merit". Faculty of Veterinary Medicine. UNAM. Mexico, 2008
- Medal to the "University Merit". National University of Mexico. UNAM. Mexico, 2009
- Member of the "Hall of Fame of the Latin American Poultry Industry". Buenos Aires, Argentina, 2011
- "Centaur Cheiron Award", given by the World Association for the History of Veterinary Medicine. University of Utrecht. The Netherlands, 2012

== Publications ==
More than 400 publications in avian medicine and in the history of medicine, science and technology.

== Books ==
- Albeytería and Albéytares in the New Spain during the XVI Century (Farriery and Farriers in the New Spain during the XVI Century) published by the University of Leon, Spain in 1996
- Epizootics, Zoonoses and Epidemics. The interchange of pathogens between the Old and New World published by the University of Leon, Spain in 2006
- History of the National Association of Poultry Producers of Mexico. Veracruz, 2008
- History of the Mexican Association of Veterinarians Specialized on Swine. Mazatlan, 2013
- Newcastle Disease. Argentina, 2013

== Lectures ==
More than 500 lectures given in more than 40 countries.
