= Lucas Márquez =

Lucas Márquez may refer to:

- Lucas Márquez (footballer, born 1988), Argentine defender
- Lucas Márquez (footballer, born 1990), Argentine defender
