= Carlos Evaristo =

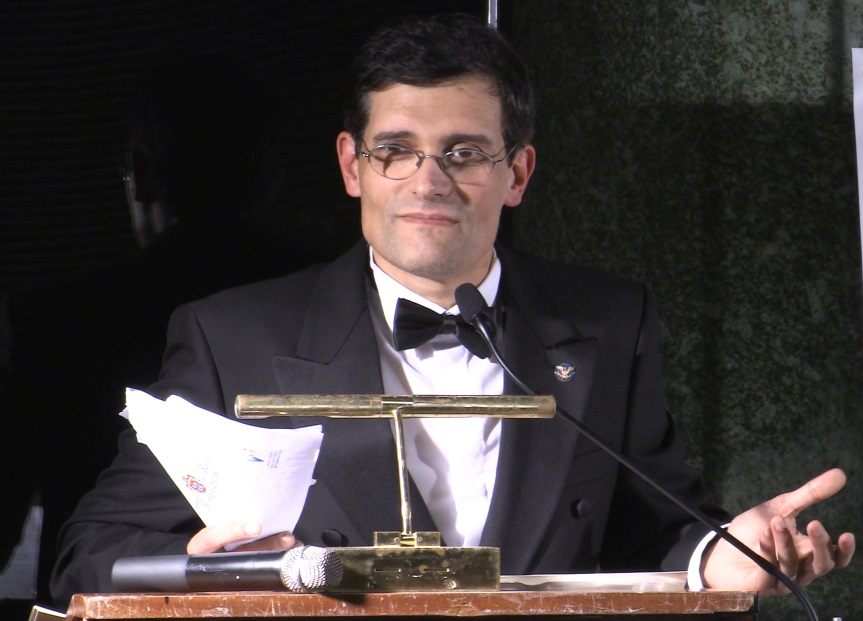
Carlos Evaristo

Carlos Evaristo is a Portuguese Canadian historian, archaeologist and author. He is also a television personality, historic and religious commentator for RTP and an executive producer for special projects at Estúdios Valentim de Carvalho. On October 25, 2019, Evaristo was appointed by the Brazilian government to serve as the Honorary Consul of Brazil in Fátima, Portugal.

== Media ==
Evaristo presented a weekly popular spot on the morning show A Praça da Alegria on RTP 1 concerning historical and religious subjects.

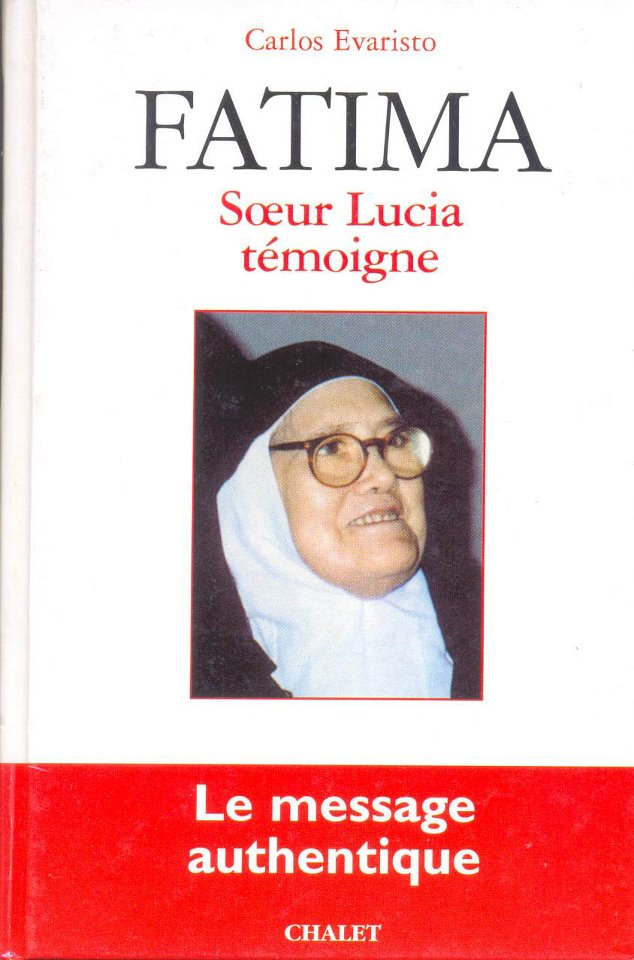

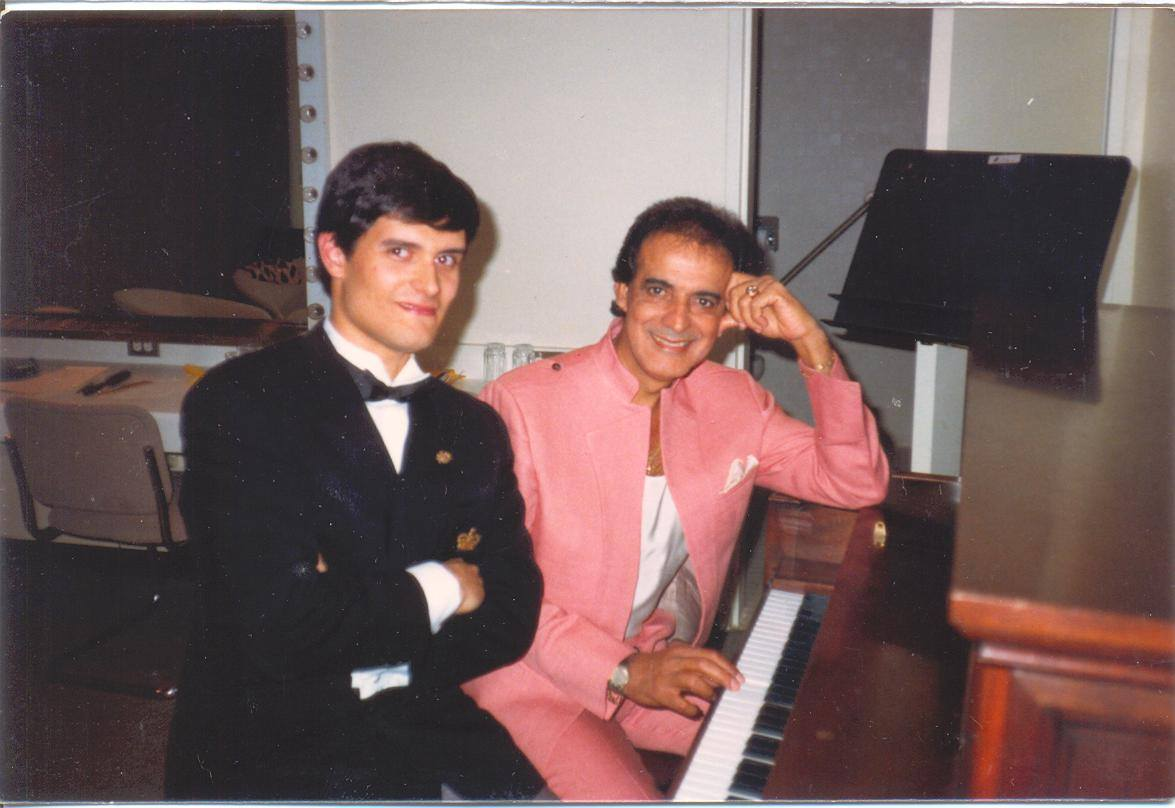
Musical Performer Carlos Evaristo rehearsing backstage at the piano with Brazilian Singer Nilton Cesar before performing for the opening of the 50th Anniversary Concert of Amalia Rodrigues, Royal Thompson Hall, Toronto, Ontario, Canada 1990.

== Culture ==
Evaristo is the president of the Oureana Foundation and the founder of the Portuguese chapter of the Real Instituto de Arqueologia Sacra.

== Religion ==
An October 11, 1993, interview was broadcast for the purpose of public clarification following malicious attacks on Evaristo by Message of Fátima conspiracy theorists.

Evaristo is a member of the Blue army and the archivist of the Domus Pacis in Fatima. He is also National Coordinator for the Alliance of the Holy Family Foundation International and a director of the Portuguese Shroud Research Centre and founder of FIDES: Federação-Internacional-de-Estudos-Sindonologicos. Under the Patronage of the Portuguese and Italian Royal Houses, Evaristo chairs the FIDES King Umberto II Award for Shroud Research and Devotion.

In 1988, he co-founded Saint Anne's Oratory Apostolate for Holy Relics with his wife. It is headquartered at the Regalis Lipsanotheca in Ourém Castle that houses one of the world's largest relic collections started by the Evaristo family.

== Arms ==
Coat of arms of Carlos Evaristo
Notes Granted by the Lord Lyon in 2024. Motto Spem Renovat Sanguine Suo
