= Origins of the Hermit Friars of the Order of Saint Augustine and Their True Establishment Before the Great Lateran Council =

1618 book by Juan Márquez

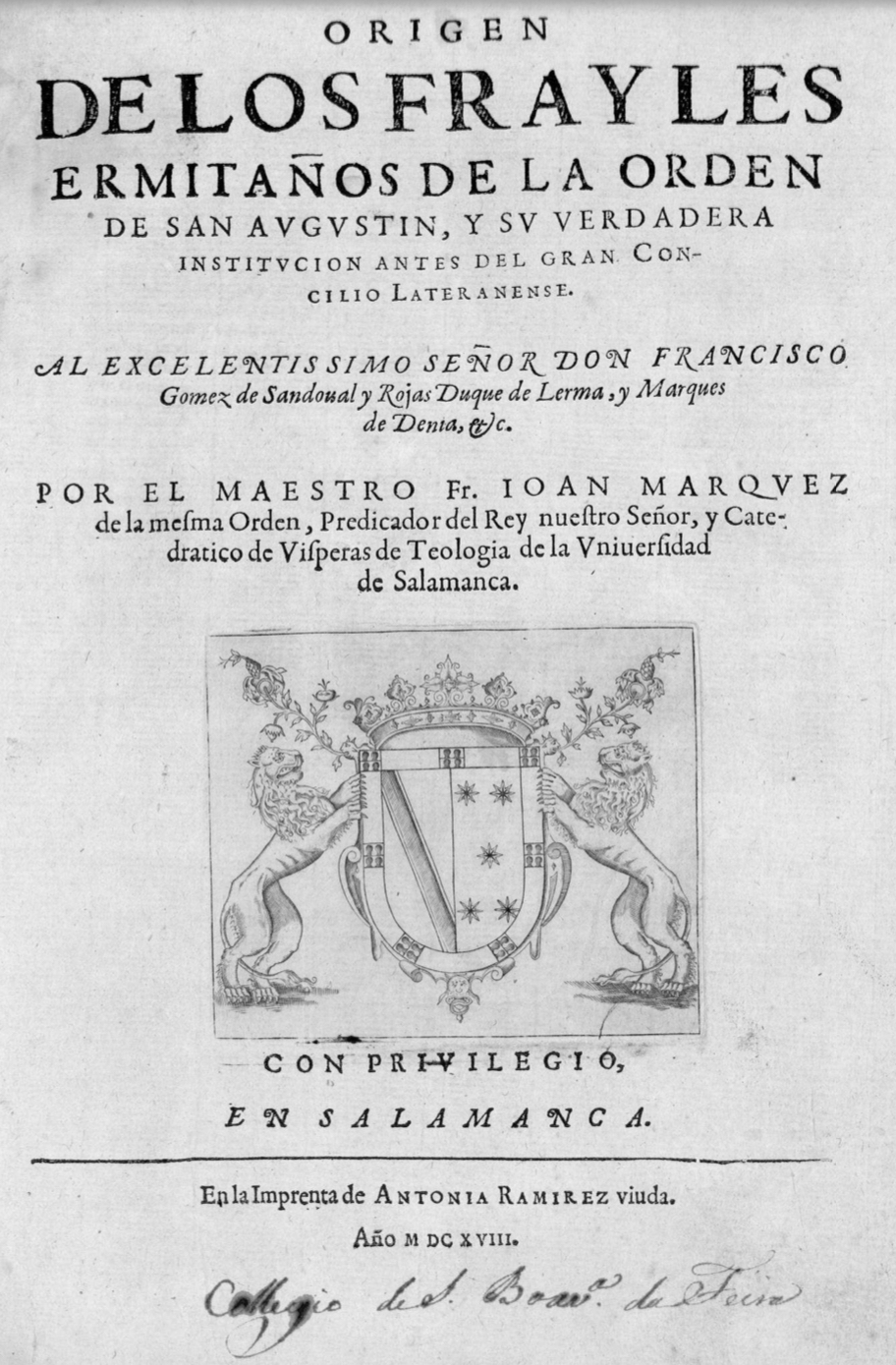
Title page of “Origen de los Frayles”

Origen de los frayles ermitaños de la Orden de San Augustin y su verdadera institucion antes del gran Concilio Lateranense (”Origins of the Hermit Friars of the Order of Saint Augustine and Their True Establishment Before the Great Lateran Council”) is a 1618 work by the Augustinian scholar Juan Márquez, Royal preacher and Chair of Theology at the University of Salamanca. It contributed to a long-running debate within the Augustinian order as to whether the friars (hermits) or the canons were the older-established foundation. Márquez argued that the hermits were the more ancient establishment.

== Context ==
The Rule of Saint Augustine is the oldest monastic rule in the western Church and for an order to claim Augustine as its founder brought considerable status and prestige. The canons lived a monastic life that dated for the most part to the reforms of Pope Gregory VII while the friars had gradually been brought under the rule much later, under Popes Gregory IX, Innocent IV and Alexander IV. Nevertheless the friars claimed that Saint Augustine had lived as a hermit before he began the monastic life, and thus that they had priority over the canons. Pope Sixtus IV was asked to adjudicate these rival claims, but instead he issued a bull, Qui apostolis praecepit that threatened excommunication for anyone who pursued this dispute.

After a period of quiet the contention resumed in Spain in the late sixteenth century when Hieronymus Roman of Salamanca University published his Chronica de la Orden de los Ermitanos del Glorioso Padre Sancto Augustin in 1569, restating the claim of primacy for the friars. This prompted Fr. Antonio Daça of Valladolid to respond in 1611 with Quarta Parte de la Chronica General de Nuestro Padre San Francisco y su Apostolica Orden, claiming that Augustine had not founded the order of friars, and had probably never been one himself. Márquez wrote the Origen specifically as a refutation of Daça.

== Arguments ==
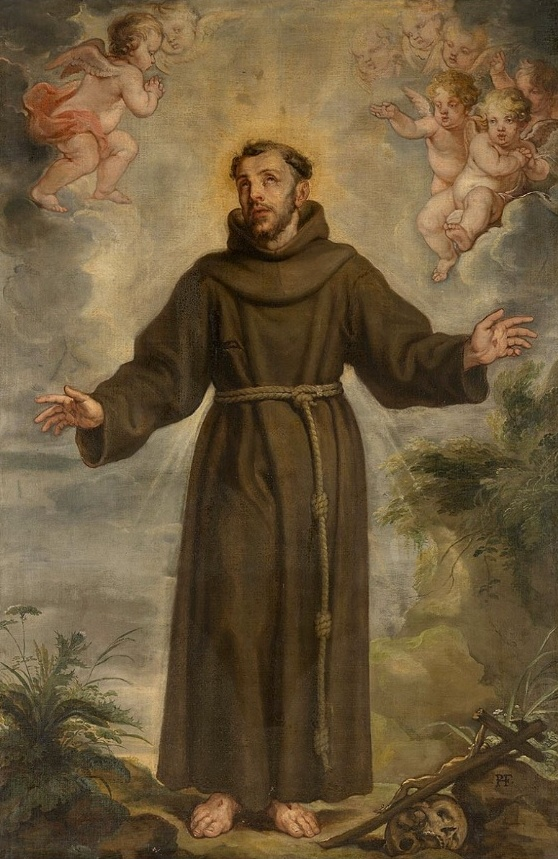
Saint Francis of Assisi

The most controversial claim in Origen, which provoked the Franciscan Order, was that Saint Francis of Assisi had probably been an Augustinian friar. Márquez also claimed that the first Augustinian had been a Spanish hermit called Leporius, bishop of Utica and that La Sisla monastery in Toledo had originally been an Augustinian hermitage. He also argued that whenever St Augustine used the term ‘frater’ in his writings he thereby automatically declared himself to belong to an order of friars rather than to the clergy.

The bitter and prolonged dispute between friars and canons drew on a wide range of sources, some of doubtful reliability and others simple forgeries. Márquez set aside a number of sources used by other writers, but sought to find ingenious new ways of demonstrating that the arguments they had supported were still true. Among the commonly used sources he did not rely on were the Sermones ad Fratres in Eremo which he accepted were not the work of St. Augustine, Epistola Beati Valerii de conversions et Baptismate beati Augustini, The Chronicle of Blessed Antony, Archbishop of Florence, Epistola ad Macedonium of Sigisbertus, the sermon De beato Augustino of Pope Clement VI.

Márquez relied on Sermon 355 of St. Possidius to support a claim that authority had never made in his Life of Saint Augustine, namely that Augustine had founded the first lay monastery in Thagaste. He then went on to say that "Saint Valerius ordained him as a priest almost by force... and seeing him so fond of monastic life, he gave him an estate, in which he founded another monastery of brothers in the countryside, and not in the city, and lived with them already ordained a priest." When he was consecrated bishop of Hippo "he was unable to continue living the monastery on Saint Valerian’s estate, and he was obliged to go and live in the city, where, not to give up the communal life, he founded another monastery... of Canons Regular". Márquez then inferred from all this that "Saint Augustine was a friar and not a regular canon", since after becoming a bishop he founded the monastery of Canons of the Church of Hippo, and being a prelate he could not be a canon, nor conform to the "laws" of the canons. Márquez also asserted, without proof, that Augustine wore "a friar's habit after becoming a bishop, out of custom and duty" under his bishop's cape. Finally, he claimed that this order founded by Augustine had been referred to by three distinct names over the course of time: the Order of Hermits of St. Augustine, the Order of Hermits, and the Order of St. Augustine.

== Critical response ==
Márquez's contribution did not settle the controversy, which continued through the seventeenth century. An Augustinian canon named Gabriele Pennotto wrote a counter-polemic in response to Márquez's arguments in his Three-part History of the Entire General Order of the Sacred Order of the General Canons (1629). This was based largely on attacking the credibility of the sources Márques had relied on. Over the following decades these sources, used by Márquez and others, came to be seen as unreliable, until eventually Christian Lupus was able to show, based entirely on Augustine's own works, that he had indeed been a hermit before he began monastic life.
