= Juan Márquez =

Spanish ascetic writer

Juan Márquez (1565–1621) was a Spanish ascetic writer. He studied at the University of Toledo and was professor of theology at Salamanca beginning in 1597. He was appointed preacher of King Philip III of Spain. Márquez wrote Origins of the Hermit Friars of the Order of Saint Augustine and Their True Establishment Before the Great Lateran Council, published at Salamanca in Spanish in 1618.
