= Menéndez Márquez =

Menéndez Márquez is a Spanish surname. In English the name is often spelled without the diacritics. It may refer to:

- Francisco Menéndez Márquez (d. 1649), royal treasurer and interim governor of Spanish Florida
- Juan Menéndez Márquez (d. 1627), royal treasurer and interim governor of Spanish Florida
- Pedro Menéndez Márquez (d. 1600), governor of Spanish Florida
- Tomás Menéndez Márquez (1643-1706), royal accountant of Spanish Florida
