= Susana Moreira Marques =

Portuguese journalist and author (born 1976)

- Born: Susana Alexandra Moreira Marques; 20 August 1976 (age 49); Porto, Portugal
- Occupations: Author, journalist

Susana Moreira Marques (born 20 August 1976) is a Portuguese journalist and author.

== Education and early career ==
Marques earned a degree in communication studies from the NOVA University of Lisbon and has worked for the BBC World Service, Público, Jornal de Negócios, Antena 1 and Mensagem de Lisboa. She has won several prizes, such as Portugal's UNESCO Human Rights and Integration Journalism Award.

== Career ==
Published in 2013, Marques' first book, Now and at the Hour of our Death, follows a palliative care team to Trás-os-Montes in northern Portugal. It was translated into English and published by And Other Stories in 2015, Spanish and French, and won Book of the Year in The New York Times. A revised edition was published in 2025 by Companhia das Letras.

Her work has appeared in literary magazines and publications such as Granta, Tin House, and Literary Hub. She has been awarded fellowships from the Gabriel García Marquez Foundation (Colombia), the Jan Michalski Foundation (Switzerland) and Art Omi (USA), among others.

== Personal life ==
She lives in Lisbon with her two daughters.

== Published works ==
- (2013) Agora e na Hora da Nossa Morte. Tinta-da-China, Portugal. ISBN 978-989-671-134-4
- (2015) Now and at the Hour of our Death. And Other Stories, UK. ISBN 9781908276629
- (2023) Lenços Pretos, Chapéus de Palha e Brincos de Ouro. Companhia das Letras, Portugal ISBN 978-989-784-960-2
- (2024) Terceiro Andar Sem Elevador. Companhia das Letras, Portugal. ISBN 978-989-787-616-5
- (2024) O Quarto. APCC, Portugal. ISBN 978-989-8725-32-5
- (2025) Braga. Centro Atlântico, Portugal. ISBN 978-989-615-256-7
- (2025) Agora e na Hora da Nossa Morte. Companhia das Letras, Portugal. ISBN 978-989-583-339-9
- (2026) Um Quadrado de Céu ou como escrever um livro sobre Caxias. Os Livros de Oeiras, Portugal. ISBN 978-989-608-311-3

== Awards ==
- (2012) Journalism Prize Human Rights and Integration (UNESCO)
- (2012) Journalism Against Indifference (AMI)
