= Evaristo Márquez Contreras =

Spanish sculptor

Evaristo Márquez

Evaristo Márquez Contreras (February 3, 1929 – January 24, 1996) was a Spanish sculptor.

== Early life ==
Evaristo Márquez Contreras was born in Juan Gallego, a small village in El Madroño, in Seville, Andalusia, Spain. He was the first son of Evaristo Márquez Fernández and Librada Contreras Alonso.

When he was four, his family moved to Nerva, Spain, in the province of Huelva. He attended primary school there. In secondary school he received a vocational certificate in bookkeeping and earned a certificate of specialization in mining. After graduation, he went to work as a servant for the Local Council while simultaneously enrolled in the university where he earned a Bachelor of Fine Arts.

== Career ==
In the early 70's, Evaristo Márquez made a sculptural portrait of "Daniel Vazquez Diaz" (painter), "José María Morón" (poet), "Jose María Labrador" (painter) and "Maestro Rojas" (musician), all of which he later donated to Nerva City Hall in 1976. They were part of the 2013 exhibit Colectiva de Arte Local (Local Art Collective) in El Museo Vázquez Diaz de Nerva museum.

In 1973 he won First Prize in Sculpture for the Exhibition "End of Course 1972/73", granted by the State Fine Arts Office. In 1974 he moved to Seville to work as a drawing teacher in different secondary schools: Gustavo Adolfo Bécquer, Vicente Aleixander, Joaquin Turina. And in that same year he won First Prize at the Exposición de otoño (Autumn Exhibition) for his work "Minero" (The Miner) sponsored by the Real Academia de Bellas Artes Santa Isabel de Hungría (Royal Academy of Fine Arts - St. Isabel of Hungary).

In the XXIV Exposición de otoño of 1975 he received an Honorable Mention for his portrait Sra. de Iturralde (The Lady from Iturralde) and the highly prestigious National Prize thanks to his sculpture El minero (The Miner). That same year the City Council of Minas de Riotinto commissioned him to develop a new sculptural project on the same subject. Evaristo Márquez created five miniature reproductions of El minero in black bronze that he later gifted to King Juan Carlos I; Governor Rafael Hurtado of Huelva; Regional Minister of Mining Eugenio Morera Altisent; former general delegate of the INP (Welfare Department) Fernando López-Barranco Rodríguez, and current general delegate of the INP Francisco Javier Minondo Sanz. They were presented in a ceremony on March 31, 1976 in the town of Minas de Riotinto.

The following year he was appointed to the board of directors for El Colegio Oficial de Profesores de Dibujo de Andalucía Occidental y Extremadura.

In 1981 he obtained an award at the XXIX Exposición de otoño for his life's work.

In 1987 at the XXXVI Exposición de Otoño, he exhibited a bronze bust of a child entitled Busto de niño and was awarded first prize. Four years later he defended his Doctoral thesis on Carmen Jiménez Serrano's sculptural work to the Faculty of Fine Arts of at the University of Seville. He co-authored the 1994 biography Carmen Jiménez with Enrique Pareja López and Carmen Jiménez.

== Death ==
Evaristo Márquez died in Seville on January 24, 1996.

== Gallery ==
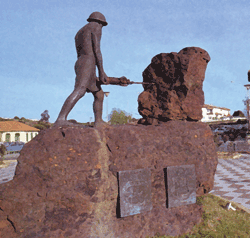
The Riotinto Miner

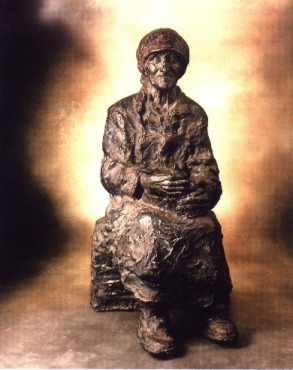
Genara

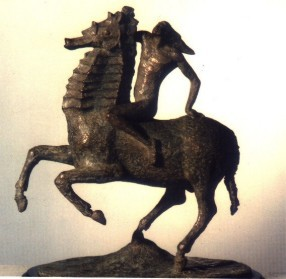
The emigrant

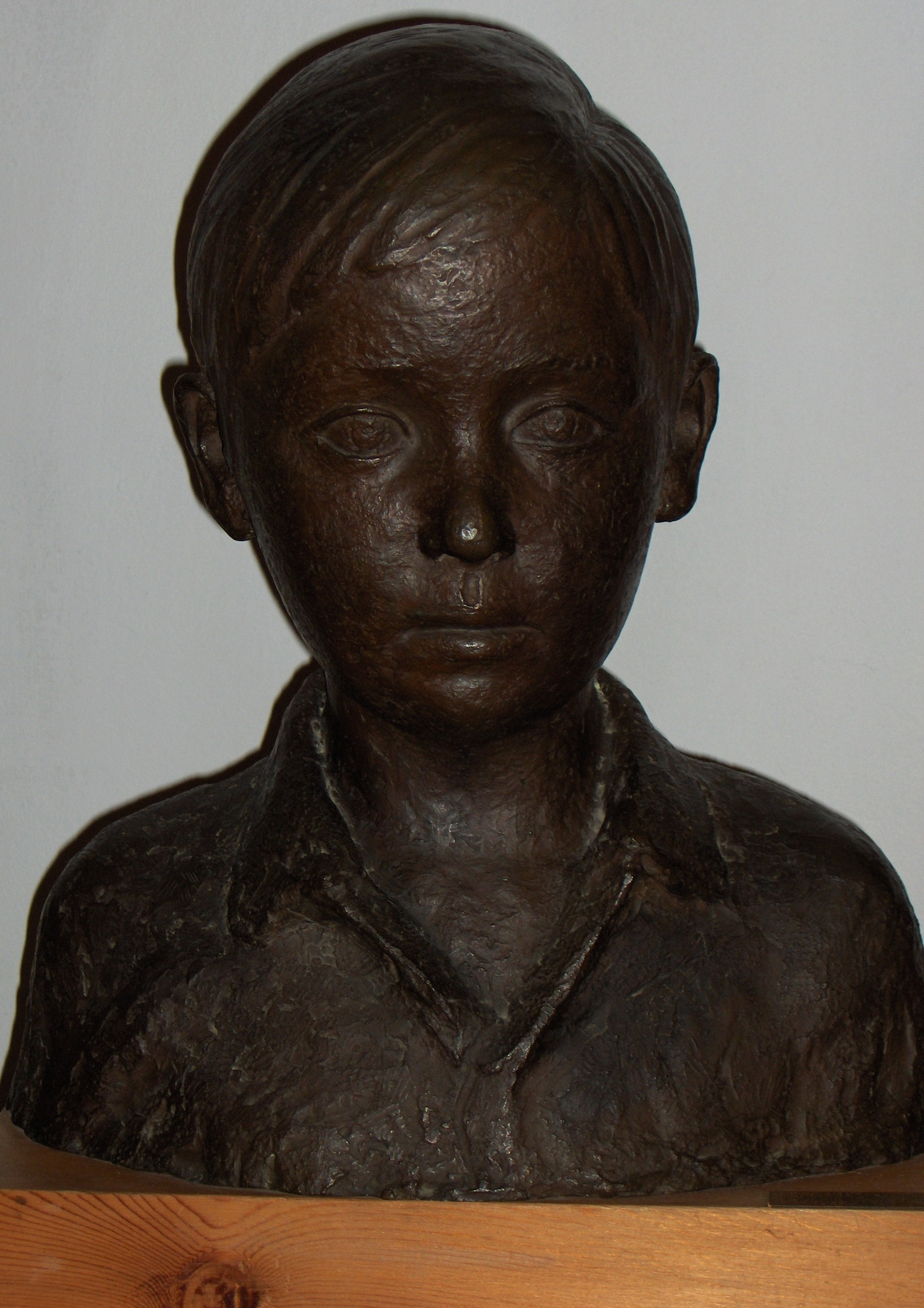
Andrés Martín Márquez

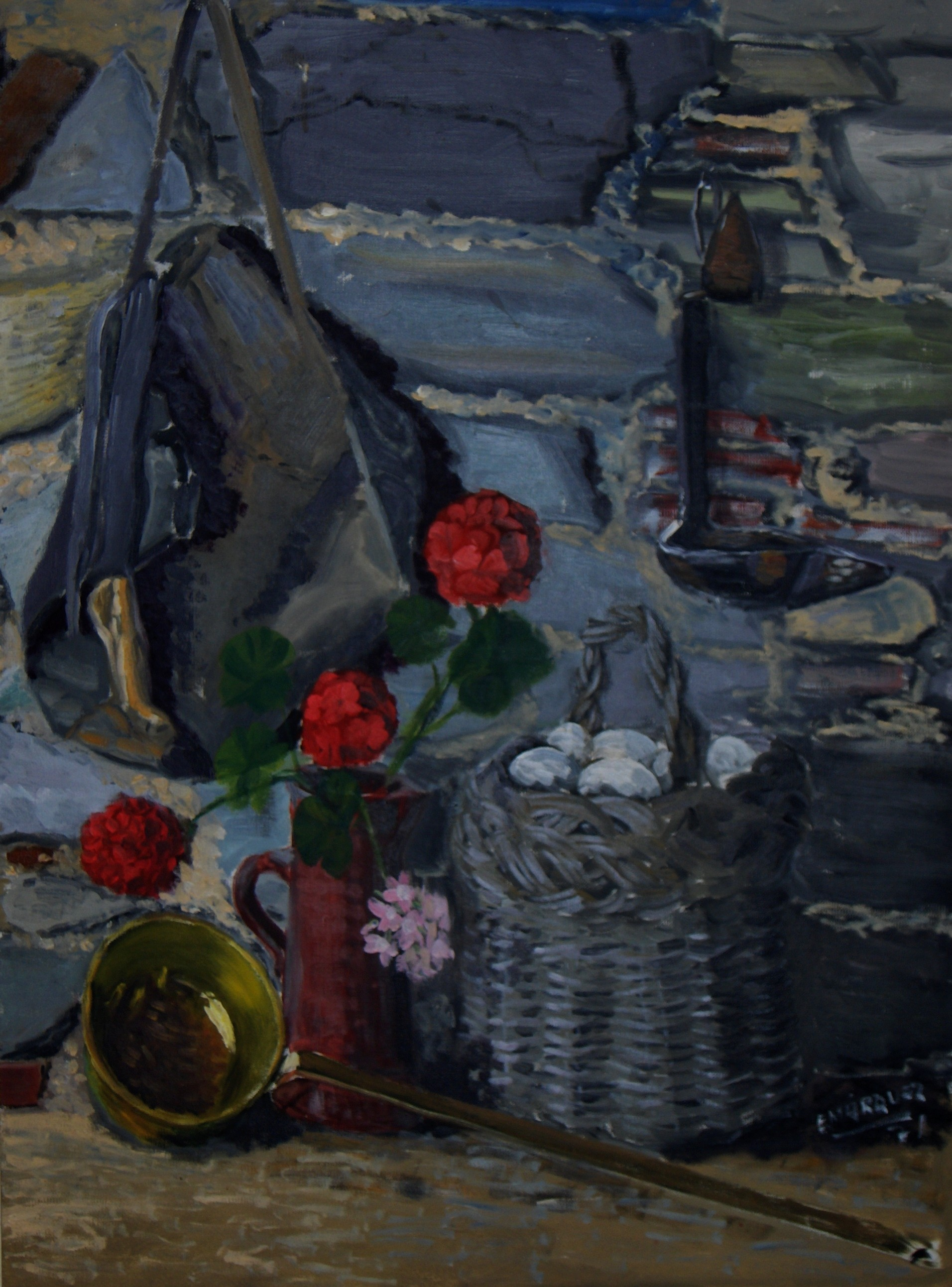
Bodegón 1971

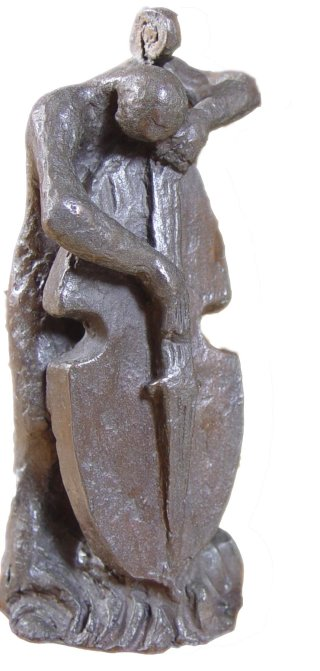
Joaquin Turina Alegory

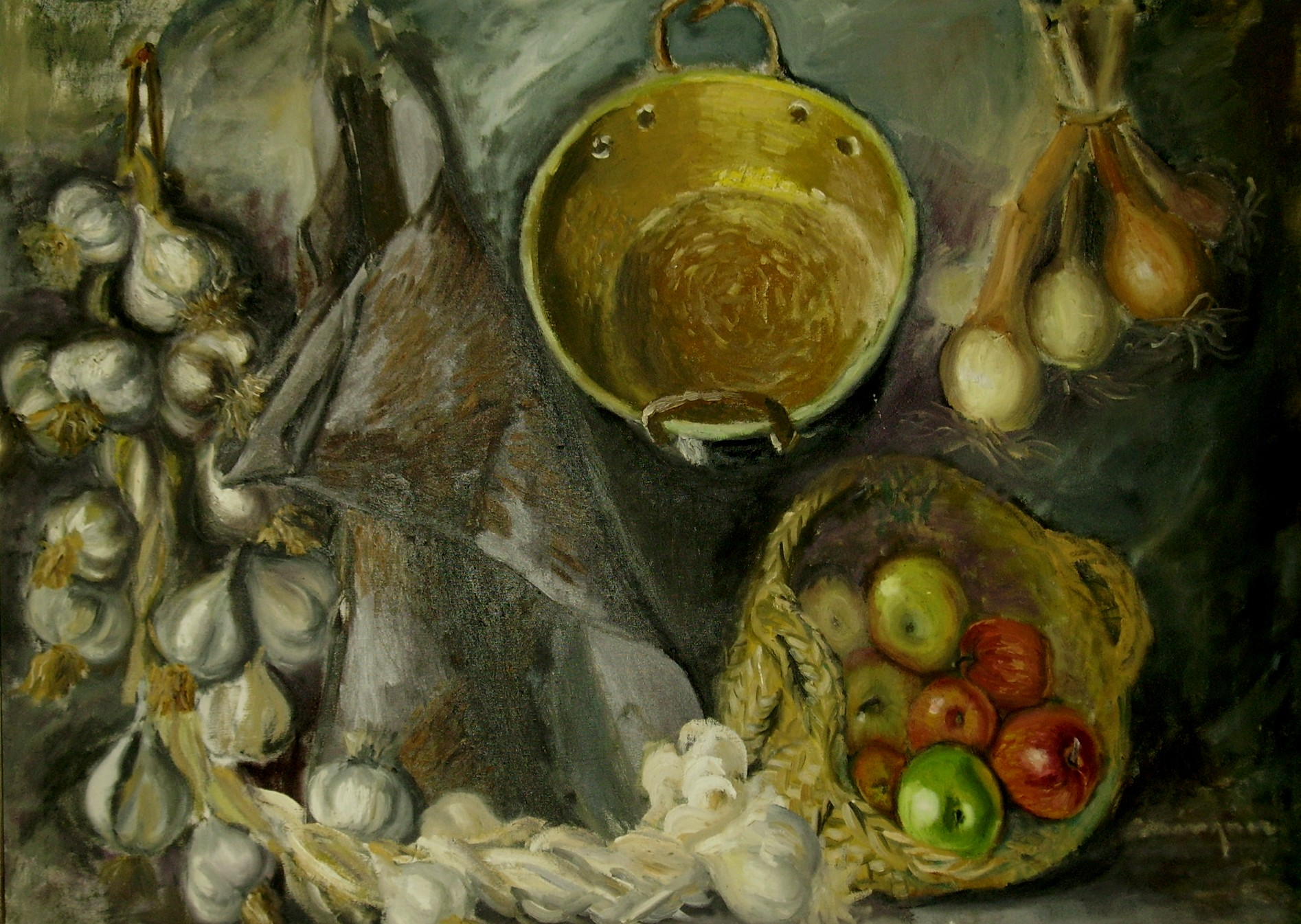
Bodegón

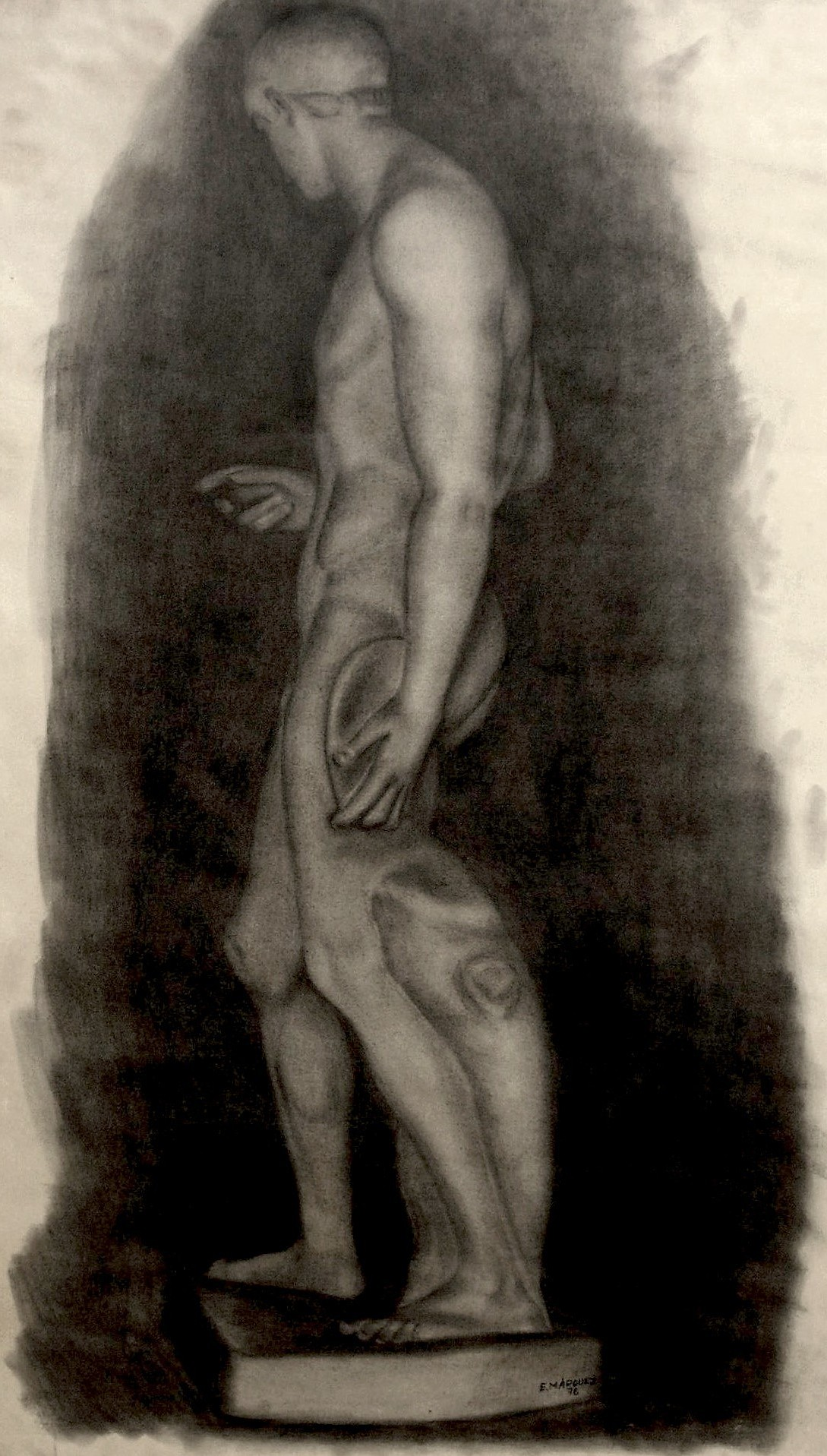
Discóbolo

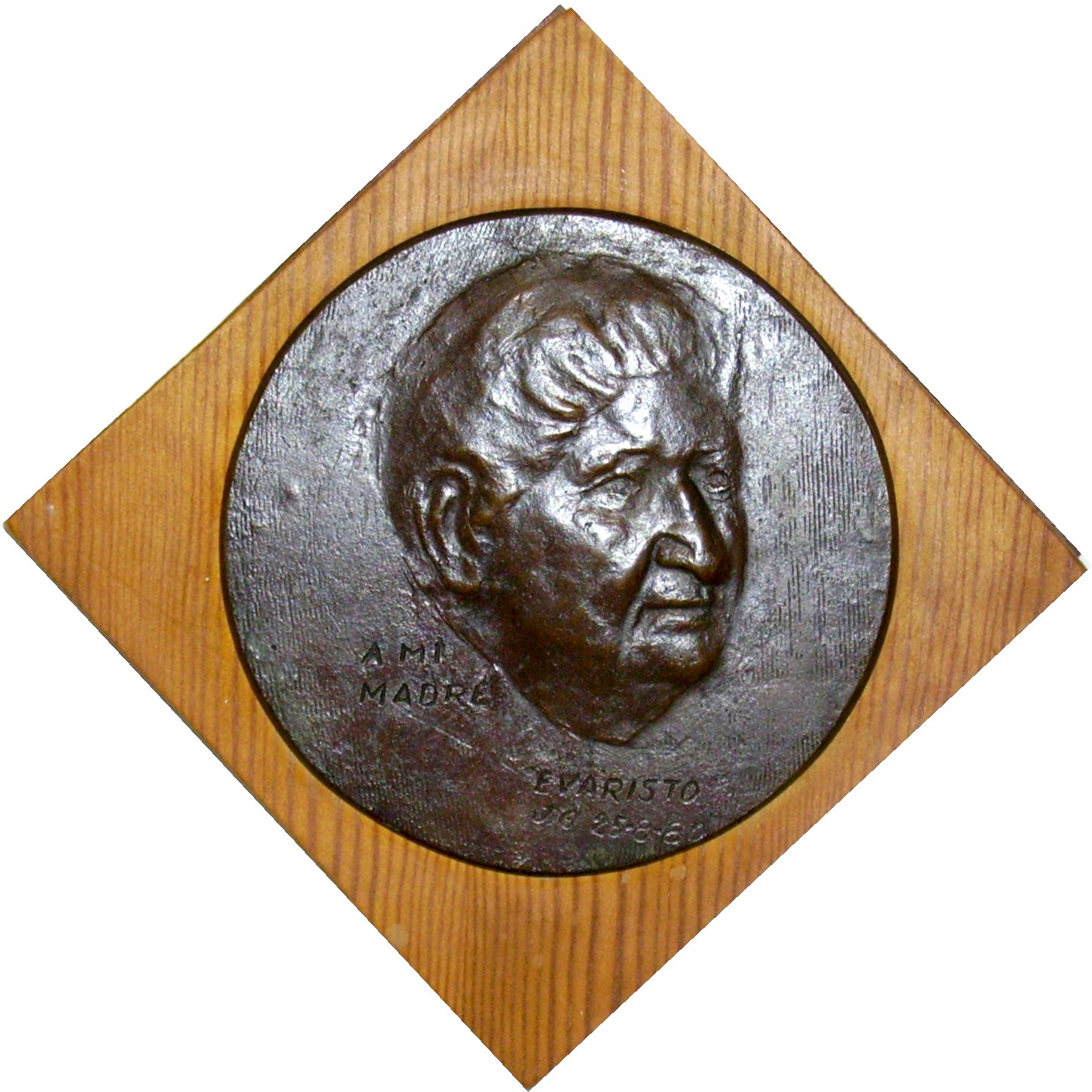
To my Mother

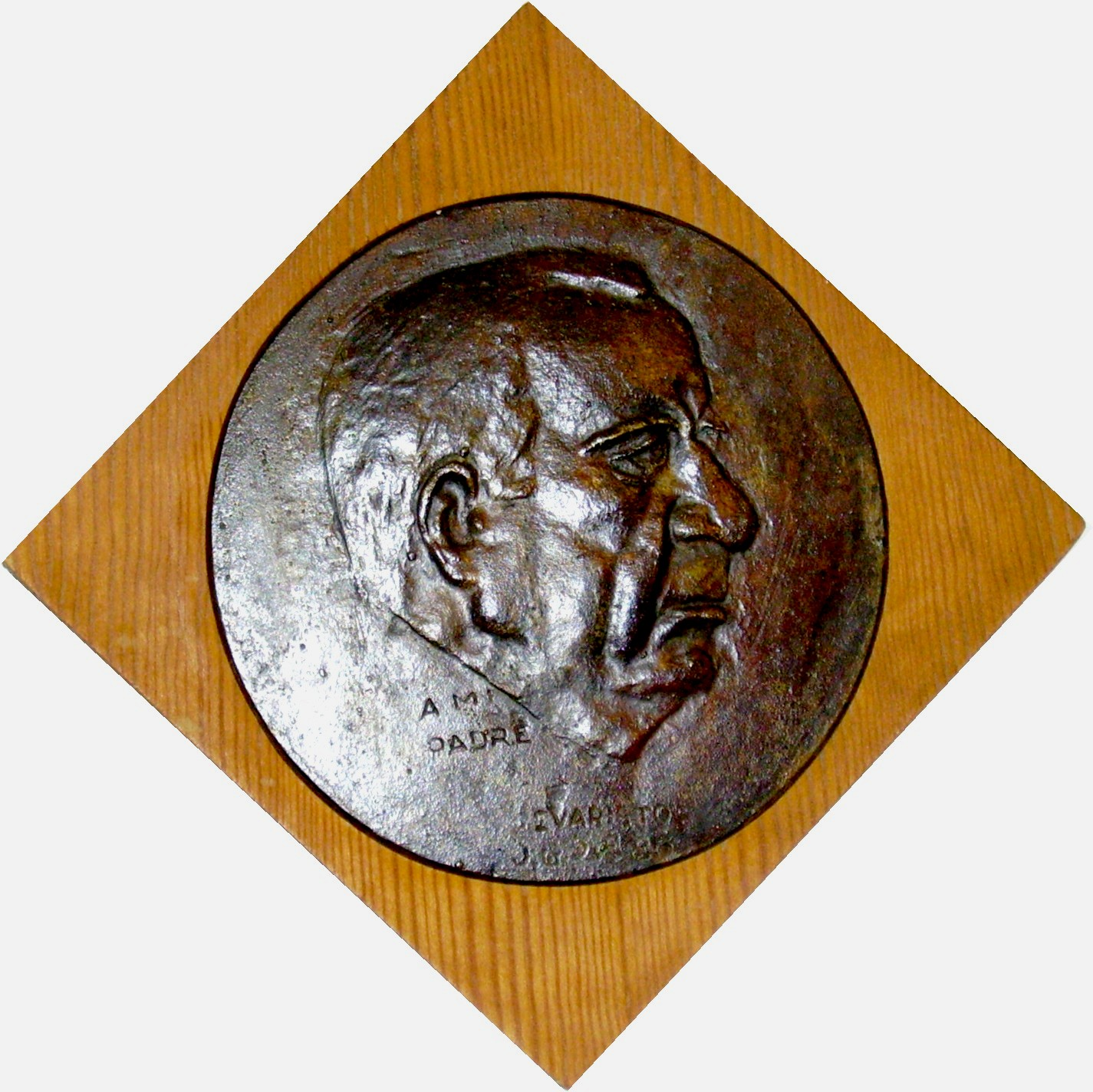
To my Father

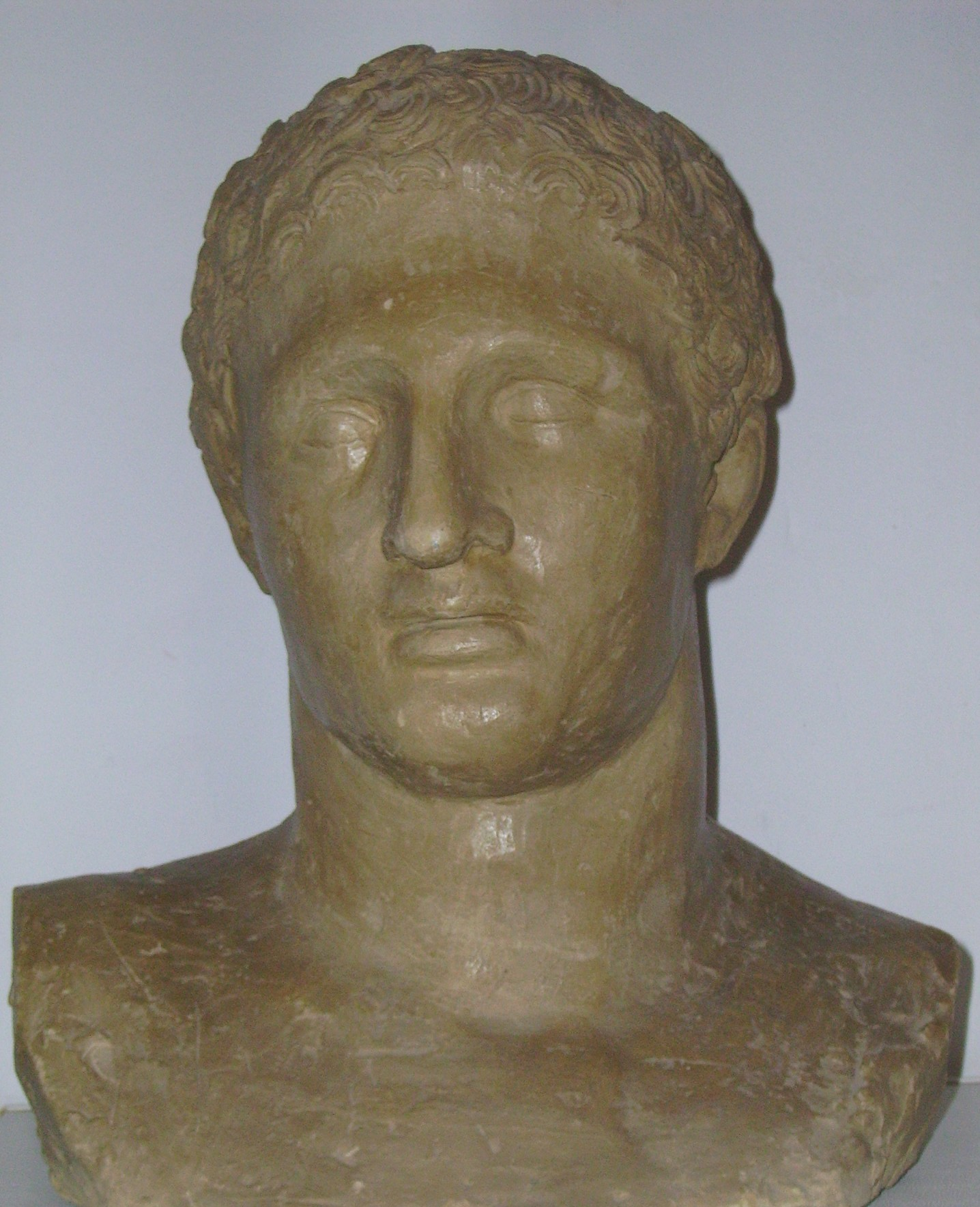
Roman

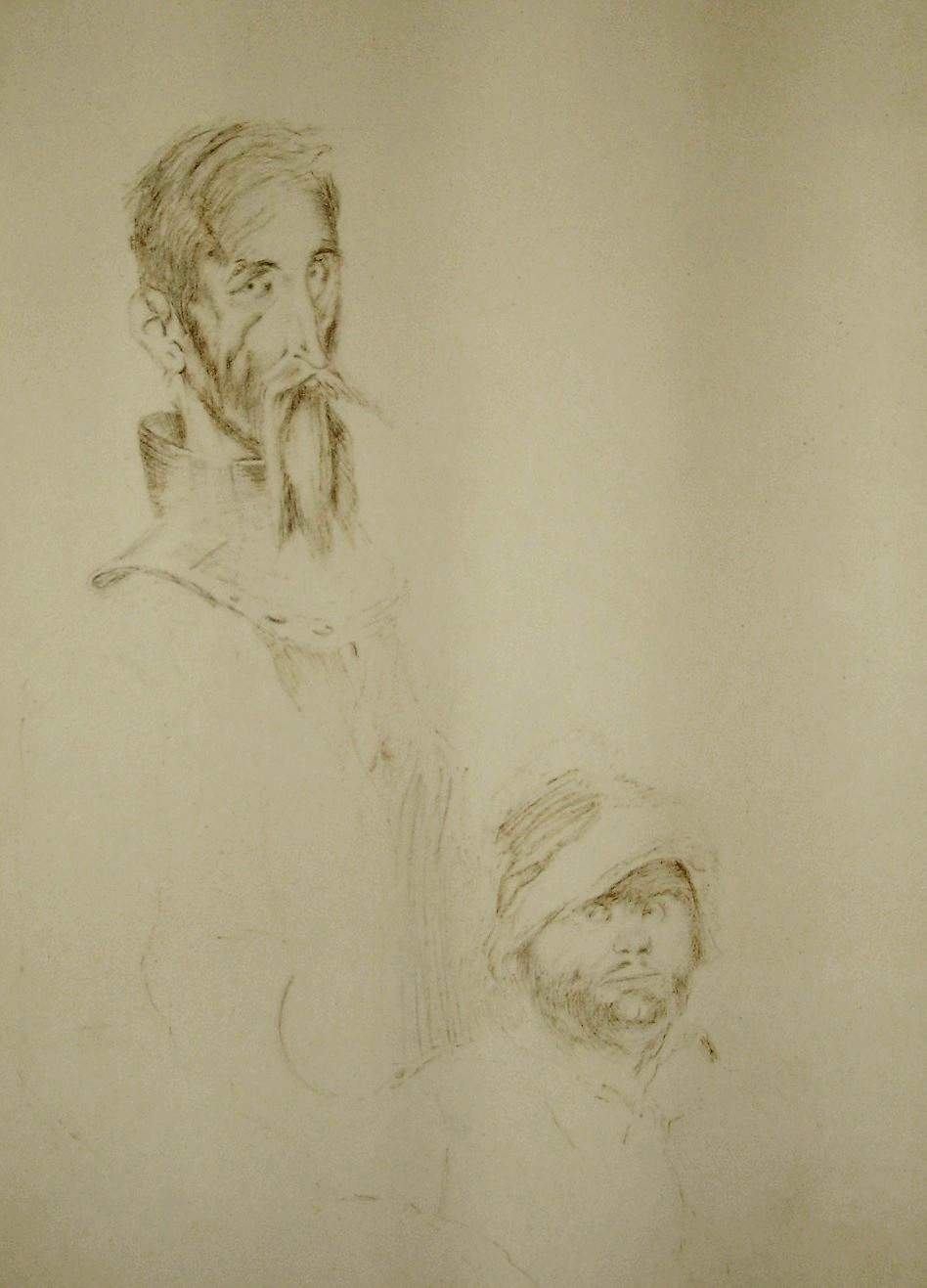
Don Quijote and Sancho Panza
