= Castle of Ourém =

Portuguese castle

Coordinates: 39.642°N 8.592°W

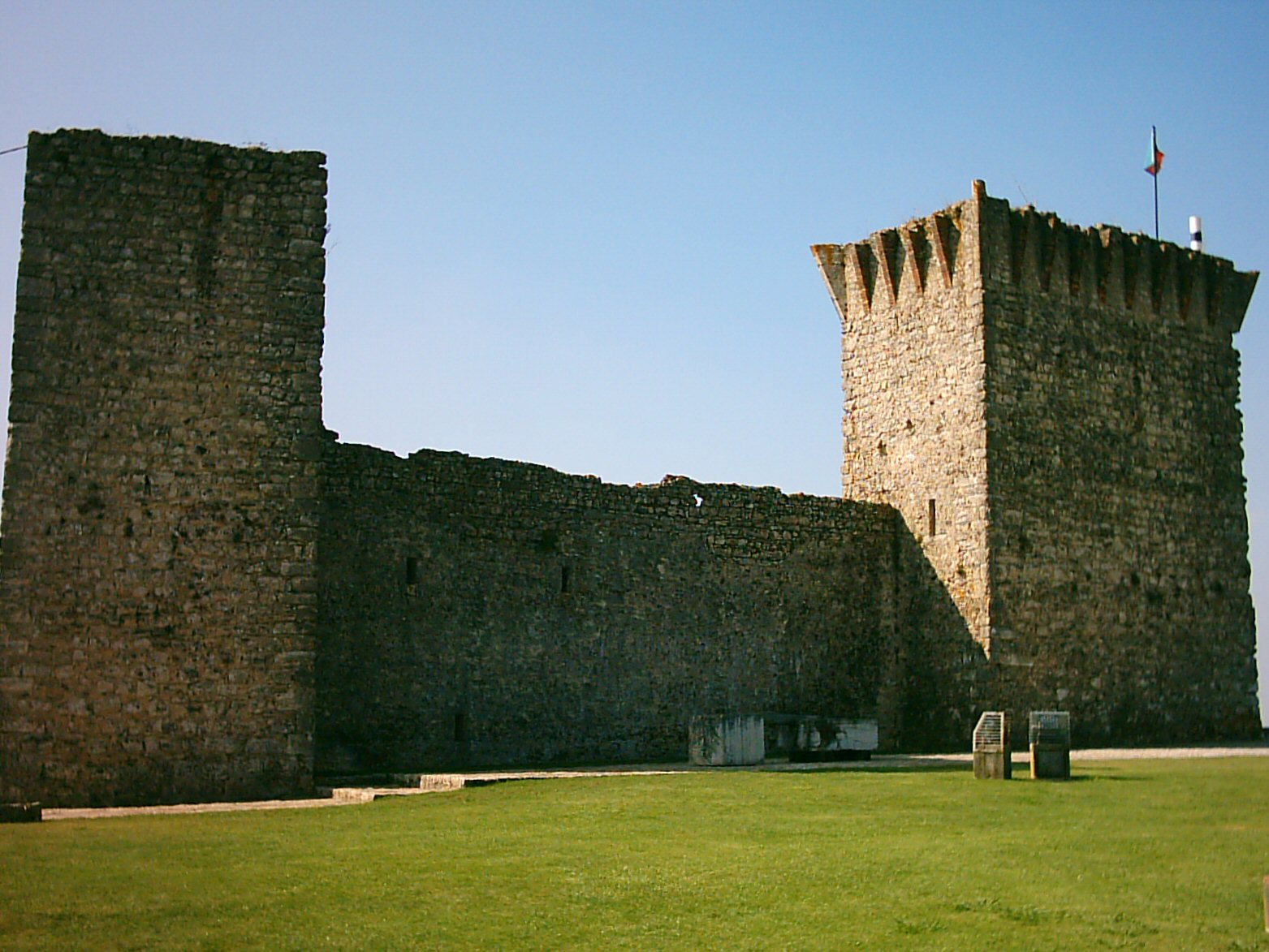
Ourém Castle.

The Ourém Castle is a Portuguese castle in Ourém, Santarém. It has been listed as a National monument since 1910.

The Ourém Castle holds the Regalis Lipsanotheca (Relic Repository). The Apostolate of Holy Relics, a Christian apostolate dedicated to the veneration of holy relics, is based at Ourém Castle.
