= Marcos (given name) =

Marcos is a Spanish and Portuguese masculine given name of Latin origin derived from the name Marcus. Markos is the Greek equivalent, while Marco is the Italian equivalent.

Marcos or Markos may refer to:

== Business ==
- Marcos Galperin, Argentine businessman
- Marcos A. Rodriguez, Cuban-American businessman
- Marcos Prado Troyjo, Brazilian businessman

== Christianity ==
- St. Mark (Μαρκος) the Evangelist, writer of the Gospel of Mark and later first Bishop of Alexandria
- Mark of Lisbon (Marcos da Silva), Portuguese Franciscan friar and historian
- Marcos de Niza, Spanish Franciscan friar
- Marcos de Torres y Rueda, Spanish bishop of Yucatán and viceroy of New Spain
- Markus Barth (1915–1994), Swiss Theologian - son of Karl

== Literature ==
- Marcos Aguinis, Argentine writer
- Marcos Jiménez de la Espada, Spanish zoologist, explorer and writer
- Marcos Rey, Brazilian writer and playwright
- Marcos Sastre, Argentine writer
- Markos Sklivaniotis, Greek writer and a poet
- Marcos Valério, Brazilian publicist

== Military ==
- Markos Botsaris, Greek military leader
- Markos Drakos (general), Greek army general

== Music ==
- Marcos Curiel, American guitarist and a member of P.O.D.
- Marcos Hernandez (singer), American pop singer
- Marcos Mundstock, Argentine classic musician
- Marcos Portugal, Portuguese classical composer
- Marcos Suzano, Brazilian percussionist
- Marcos Valle, Brazilian singer, songwriter and record producer
- Markos Vamvakaris, Greek songwriter and musician
- Marcos Witt, American pastor and musician

== Politics ==
- Marcos Archambault, Canadian politician
- Markos Drakos (EOKA fighter), Cypriot guerrilla fighter
- Marcos Kyprianou, Cypriot lawyer and politician
- Marcos Morínigo, Paraguayan politician and former president
- Markos Natsinas, Greek politician
- Marcos Paz, Argentine politician
- Marcos Pérez Jiménez, Venezuelan politician
- Marcos Peña, Argentine politician
- Marcos Pereira (politician) (born 1972), Brazilian politician
- Markos Vafiadis, leading cadre of the Communist Party of Greece

== Sports ==
- Marcos Acuña, Argentine footballer
- Marcos Aguirre, Argentine footballer
- Marcos Alonso, Spanish footballer
- Marcos Ambrose, Australian racing driver
- Marcos Angeleri, Argentine footballer
- Marcos Armas, Venezuela-born American baseball player
- Marcos Assunção, Brazilian football player
- Marcos Aurellio, Argentine footballer
- Marcos Ayerza, Argentine rugby union player
- Marcos Baghdatis, Cypriot tennis player and 2006 Australian Open finalist
- Marcos Calderón, Peruvian footballer and manager
- Marcos Carvajal, Venezuela-born American baseball player
- Marcos Couch, Argentine mountain climber
- Marcos Croce, Argentine footballer
- Marcos Daniel, Brazilian tennis player
- Marcos Delía, Argentine basketball player
- Marcos Díaz (footballer), Argentine goalkeeper
- Marcos Evangelista de Moraes, Brazilian football player better known as Cafu
- Marcos Giron, American tennis player
- Marcos Kremer, Argentine rugby union player
- Marcos Ledesma, Argentine footballer
- Marcos Llorente, Spanish football player
- Marcos Martinez Ucha, Spanish racing car driver
- Marcos Maidana, Argentine boxer
- Marcos Milinkovic, Argentine volleyball player
- Marcos Moneta, Argentine rugby union player
- Marcos Ondruska, South African tennis player
- Marcos Painter, Irish football player
- Marcos Paquetá, Brazilian football player
- Marcos Peano, Argentine footballer
- Marcos Pinto, Argentine footballer
- Marcos Pizzelli, Brazilian-Armenian footballer
- Marcos Riquelme, Argentine footballer
- Marcos Rojo, Argentine footballer
- Marcos Roberto Silveira Reis, a Brazilian goalkeeper from Palmeiras
- Marcos Senesi, Argentine footballer
- Marcos Senna, Spanish-Brazilian football player
- Marcos-Antonio Serrano, Spanish cyclist

== Television and film ==
- Marcos Ferraez, American actor
- Marcos Mundstock, Argentine actor and musician
- Marcos A. Rodriguez, American Media and Film Executive
- Marcos Siega, American film and music director
- Marcos Zucker, Argentine actor

== Other occupations ==
- Markos Mamalakis, Greek economist
- Marcos Moshinsky, Mexican physicist
- Marcus Musurus, Greek scholar and philosopher
- Marcos Rodríguez Pantoja (born 1946), Spanish feral child
- Marcos Pontes, Brazilian astronaut
- Marcos Restrepo, Ecuatorian painter

== Other uses ==
- Marcos Alonso (disambiguation)

== See also ==
- Marco (given name)
- Marcus (name)
