= Ramón Evaristo =

- Birth name: Ramon Martínez Fernández
- Born: 14 October 1909; Cuenca, Spain
- Died: 10 February 1990 (aged 80); Barcelona, Spain
- Genres: Swing; pasodoble; rhumba
- Occupations: Bandleader; musician; composer
- Instrument: Violin
- Years active: 1932–1982
- Labels: Columbia, Odeón, La Voz de su Amo
- Formerly of: Bonet de San Pedro; Rina Celi; Lleó Borrell

Ramón Martínez Fernández (14 October 1909 – 10 February 1990), better known as Ramón Evaristo, was a Spanish bandleader and violinist based in Barcelona. In the 1940s and 1950s, his orchestra was one of the most popular ballroom music ensembles in Catalonia, playing jazz, pasodobles and Latin American music such as rhumba and tango.

As a composer, Evaristo wrote several popular songs, particularly fox-trots.

== Life and career ==
Born in Cuenca, Spain on 14 October 1909, Evaristo took up the violin at 7 years of age, and did several music courses in Granada before moving to Barcelona at age 11. In 1932 he became a founding member of the amateur jazz ensemble Orquesta Royaltie (later known as Orquesta Creación), based in Vilafranca del Penedès. During the Spanish Civil War, he fought for the Spanish Republican Army, which was defeated in 1939. The new government forced him to relocate to Las Hurdes, Extremadura, but he returned to Barcelona shortly after. He founded his own orchestra in 1940, featuring saxophonist José Llata, clarinetist Adolf Ventas, and singers such as Rina Celi, Enrique del Caro and Bonet de San Pedro. In 1941, trumpeter/violinist José Puertas joined the band after leaving another popular ensemble of the time, Orquesta Plantación. Evaristo's orchestra would compete with that of a fellow violinist, Bernard Hilda, in the Barcelona of the 1940s. Evaristo also played in smaller jazz combos alongside pianist Lleó Borrell.

From the 1960s, Evaristo's popularity waned. He played his last performance in Torelló in 1982 at a tribute concert to Duke Ellington. He died in Barcelona on 10 February 1990.
