= Marqués (surname) =

Marqués is a Spanish-language surname, meaning Marquis.

Marquès is a Catalan-language surname, meaning Marquis.

== People ==
- Aina Moll Marquès (1930–2019), Spanish philologist and politician
- Fernando Marqués (born 1984), Spanish footballer
- Francisco Domingo Marqués (1842–1920), Spanish painter
- Miguel Marqués (1843–1918), Spanish composer and violinist
- Nemesi Marquès i Oste (born 1935), Andorran priest
- René Marqués (1919–1979), Puerto Rican short story writer and playwright

== Places ==
- Viso del Marqués, a municipality in Ciudad Real, Spain
- Cerro La Cruz del Marqués, peak of the Ajusco Mountain Range in Mexico
- El Marqués, a municipality in Mexico
