= Sandra Marquez =

American theatre director and actress

Sandra Marquez is a Jeff-winning actor, director, and educator based in Chicago. She is an ensemble member with Steppenwolf Theatre, Teatro Vista and Remy Bumppo Theatre Company.

== Career ==
Marquez is a longtime ensemble member of Teatro Vista, the Midwest's only Equity Latino theatre company, where she served as the company's Associate Artistic Director from 1998 to 2006. Marquez has worked at respected companies in the Chicago area and beyond, including Goodman Theatre, Steppenwolf Theatre, Victory Gardens, Oregon Shakespeare Festival, Madison Repertory, and off-Broadway at Second Stage Theatre. She won a Jeff Award for her portrayal of Beatrice in Arthur Miller's A View from the Bridge, directed Men on the Verge of Hispanic Breakdown for Pride Films and Plays and My Manana Comes for Teatro Vista, and played Clytemnestra in Aeschylus’ Agamemnon at Court Theatre in a new translation by Nicholas Rudall. She has been a member of the theatre faculty at Northwestern University since 1995.

== Awards ==
Award	Year	Category	Role	Show	Company	Won/Nominated
Equity Jeff Award	2013-2014	Best Supporting Actress	Beatrice	A View From The Bridge	Teatro Vista	Won
