= Carmen Jiménez =

Spanish painter

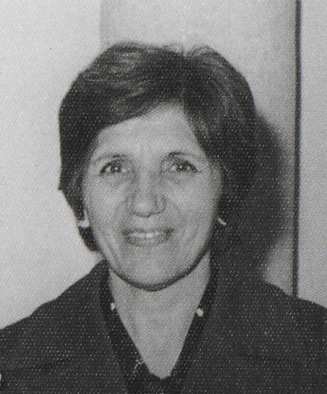
- Born: Carmen Jiménez Serrano; 21 September 1920; La Zubia, Spain
- Died: 19 October 2016 (aged 96); Seville, Spain
- Education: Real Academia de Bellas Artes de San Fernando
- Occupations: Painter, sculptor, professor
- Employers: Real Academia de Bellas Artes de Santa Isabel de Hungría; University of Seville
- Spouse: Antonio Cano Correa
- Awards: National Sculpture Award (1951); Gold Medal at the National Exhibition of Fine Arts (1952, 1958)

Carmen Jiménez Serrano (21 September 1920 – 19 October 2016) was a Spanish painter, sculptor, and professor.

== Biography ==
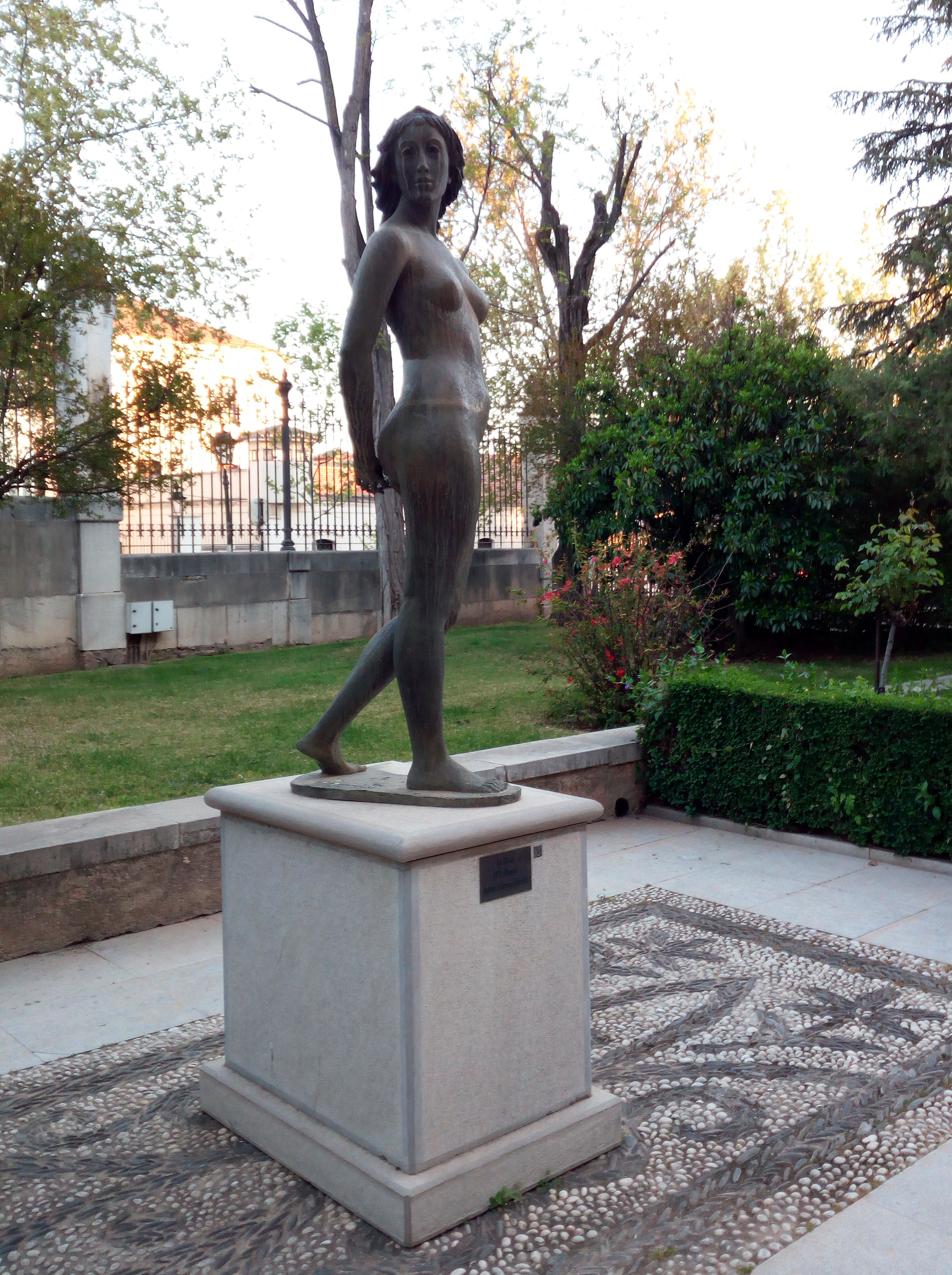
La Danza (1975) at the University of Granada

Carmen Jiménez was born in La Zubia on 21 September 1920. She began her artistic studies at the School of Arts and Crafts in Granada shortly after the Civil War ended in 1939. Although she initially favored embroidery studies, contact with other students at the school such as painter Miguel Pérez Aguilera and sculptor Nicolás Prados López, who would go on to study fine arts in Madrid, inclined her to prepare her application to the Real Academia de Bellas Artes de San Fernando. In the meantime she worked at a sculpture workshop, creating religious images. She joined the Madrid school for the academic year 1940–41, thanks to her income and a scholarship from the city council of La Zubia. There she studied painting and discovered, with Enrique Pérez Comendador, her inclination for sculpture.

In 1944 she married the sculptor Antonio Cano Correa (1909–2009). When he won the position of chair at the Real Academia de Bellas Artes de Santa Isabel de Hungría of Seville, she moved with him to the Andalusian city and began to work as an assistant to the Modeling and Composition chair at the same school. In 1984 she would attain the chair herself – the first woman to do so – and continued in the role when the Fine Arts school was brought under the University of Seville.

She died in Seville on 19 October 2016 at age 96.

== Legacy ==
Experts have praised "her aesthetics and beauty of forms and dimensions, charged with rhythm, proportion, and harmony", "where interest in the human figure predominates". For his part, Juan Manuel Miñarro highlights her quality as an artist and as a teacher, "capable of conveying the craft very well". The painter and sculptor Ricardo Suárez emphasizes her expressiveness with mud, stone carving, and great mastery of volumetry. Professor Emilio Gómez Piñol values the great quality of the whole of her work.

Her work is exhibited at the Museum of Contemporary Art in Madrid, the Museum of Fine Arts of Seville, the Círculo de Bellas Artes, the library of the University of Granada, and the Museum of Fine Arts of Seville.

== Awards and honors ==
- Medal of the Círculo de Bellas Artes (1949)
- National Sculpture Award (1951)
- Gold Medal at the National Exhibition of Fine Arts (1952)
- Gold Medal at the National Exhibition of Fine Arts (1958)
- Medal of Honor of the Real Academia de Bellas Artes de Santa Isabel de Hungría (1981)
- Medal of Honor of the Real Academia de Bellas Artes de Nuestra Señora de las Angustias (2010)
- Corresponding academic of the Real Academia de Bellas Artes de San Fernando and numerary of the Real Academia de Bellas Artes de Santa Isabel de Hungría
