= Evaristo Endanco =

Italian cyclist

Personal information
- Born: 26 August 1896
- Died: Unknown

Cycling career
- Sport: Cycling
- Role: Rider

Evaristo Endanco was an Italian racing cyclist. He rode in the 1922 Tour de France.
