= Marcos Alonso =

Marcos Alonso may refer to any of the following Spanish footballers:

- Marcos Alonso (footballer, born 1933) (1933–2012), also known as "Marquitos", defender
- Marcos Alonso (footballer, born 1959) (1959–2023), his son, former winger and coach
- Marcos Alonso (footballer, born 1990), his grandson, defender/midfielder for RC Celta de Vigo

== See also ==
- Marcos (disambiguation)
- Alonso
