= Praia do Evaristo =

Beach within the Municipality of Albufeira, in the Algarve, Portugal

- Beach
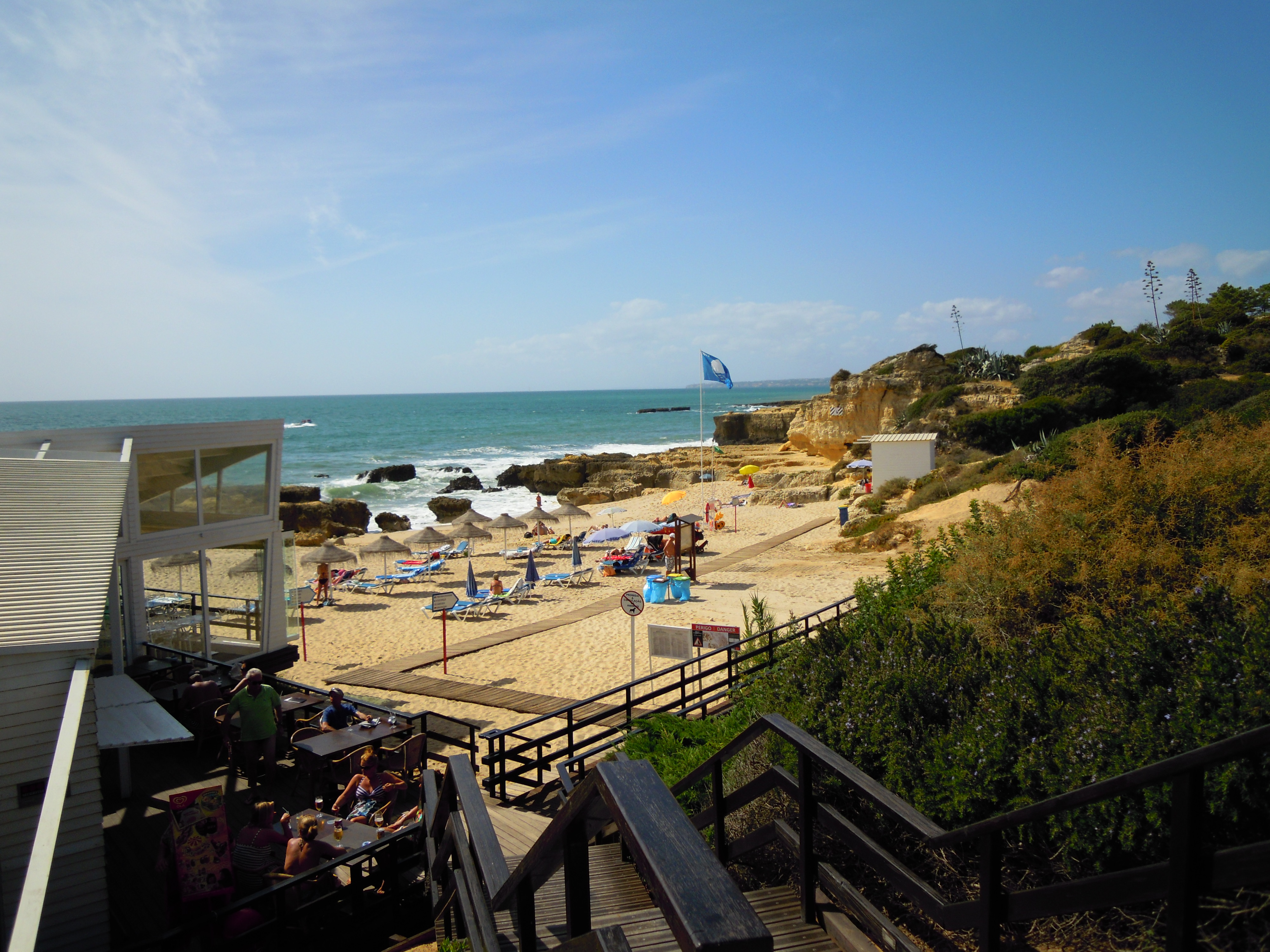
- Praia do Evaristo

- Location within Portugal
- Coordinates: 37°4′27″N 8°18′10″W
- Location: Albufeira, Algarve, Portugal

Praia do Evaristo is a beach within the Municipality of Albufeira, in the Algarve, Portugal. The beach is 3.8 miles (6.1 km) west of the town of Albufeira and is 31.3 miles (50.4 km) west of the regions capital of Faro. In 2012 Praia do Evaristo has been designated a Blue Flag beach.

== Description ==
Praia do Evaristo is a small beach to the west of the resort town of Albufeira. This well-kept beach has blue flag status(2012). The beach has fine golden sand with low indented ochre-coloured cliffs to the rear. On the sand there are a number of rocky little nooks and crannies provided by the various rock formations. To the centre back of the beach there is a seasonal watercourse that runs down to the sea and is completely dry for a majority of the year. The sea is safe and clean and has an average summer seawater temperature of 20-23 °C. The sea water quality classification system on has given this beach a three-star rating. The rocky outcrops that clutter the seashore are an ideal environment for those that enjoy snorkelling where the marine life can be seen in abundance.

=== Car Park ===
To the back of the beach there is a car park of which some places there are allocated parking bays for disabled drivers displaying a European blue badge. Parking can prove very difficult during the busy summer months. From the car park there is a boardwalk down to, and along the beach which provides easy access for wheelchair users.

=== Facilities ===
During the summer season the beach is patrolled by lifeguards. There are Loungers, parasols and Pedalo's which can be hired. The beach has good access for the disabled having boardwalks running east and west along the back of the beach from the central car park. There are showers and toilets available at the eastern end of the beach next to the snack bar. There is also a beach restaurant which specialises in fish.

The restaurant was demolished in February 2024 and now the beach is empty.

== Gallery ==
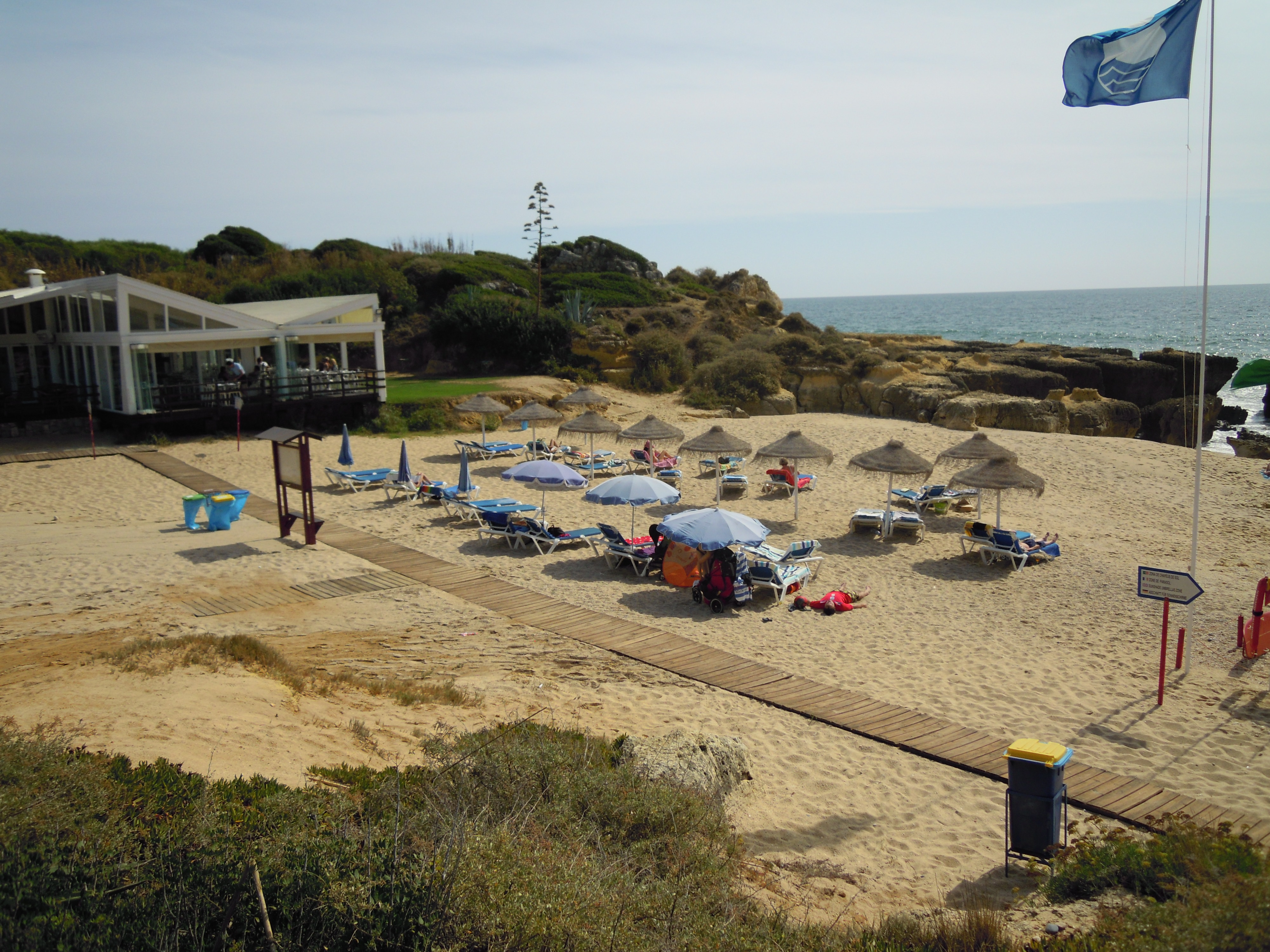
The Evaristo Restaurant at the eastern end of the beach

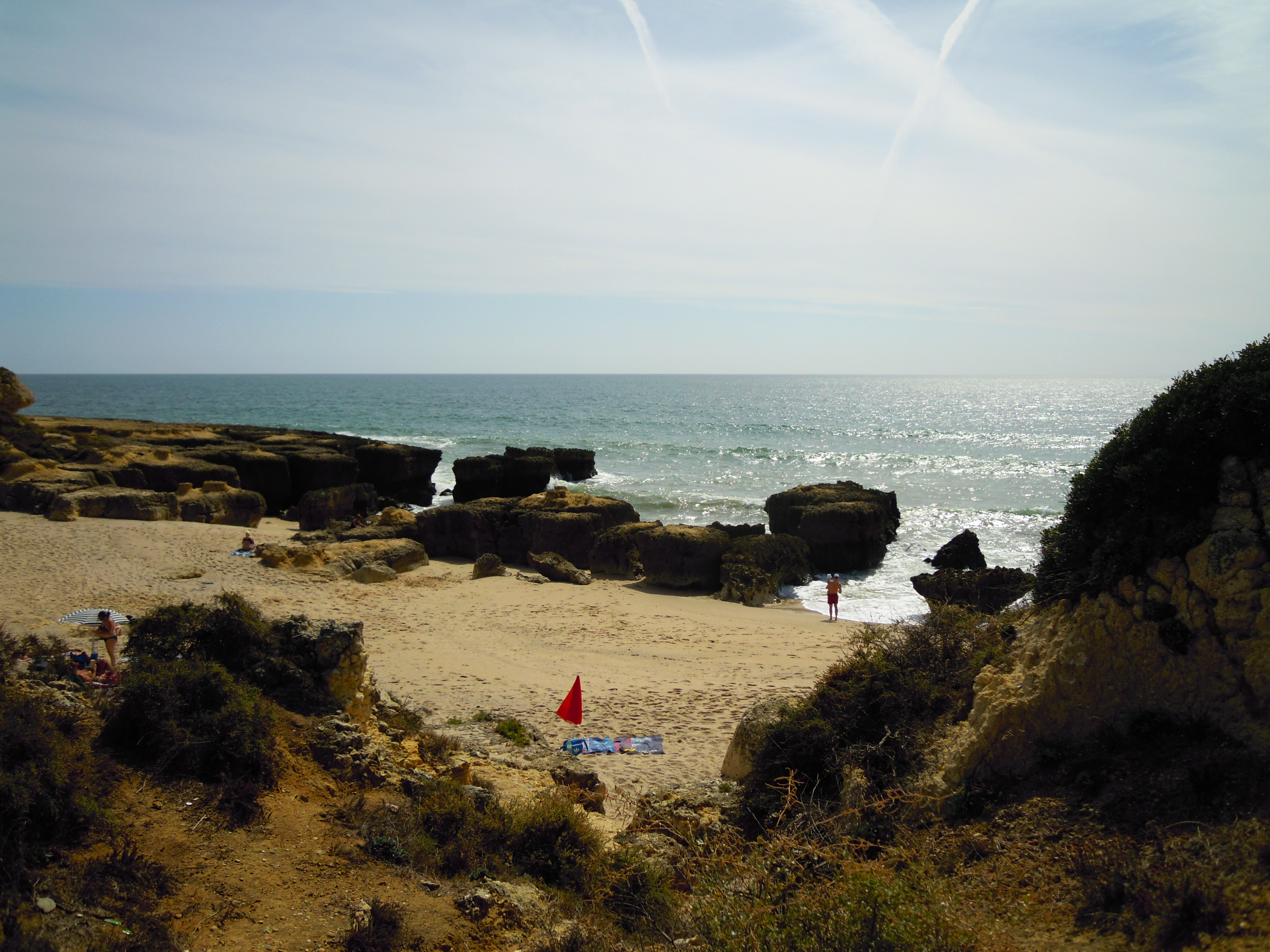
