= Lucas Márquez (footballer, born 1990) =

Argentine footballer

Personal information
- Full name: Lucas Márquez
- Date of birth: 21 July 1990 (age 36)
- Place of birth: Junín, Argentina
- Position: Defender

Youth career
- Deportivo San Agustín
- 9 de Julio
- 2007–2009: Sarmiento

Senior career*
Years	Team	Apps	(Gls)
2009–2012	Sarmiento	14	(0)
2012–2013	Agropecuario	12	(1)
2013–2014	Once Tigres	38	(3)
- * Club domestic league appearances and goals

Lucas Márquez (born 21 July 1990) is an Argentine footballer who plays as a defender. He is currently a free agent.

== Career ==
Márquez's youth career started with Deportivo San Agustín, which preceded a spell with 9 de Julio. He joined Sarmiento in 2007 and made his first-team debut two years later in Primera B Metropolitana. He departed Sarmiento three years after his debut, joining Agropecuario for the 2012–13 Torneo Argentino B season. One goal in twelve appearances followed. In 2013, Márquez joined fellow Torneo Argentino B side Once Tigres. He remained for one season, 2013–14, scoring three goals in thirty-eight games.

== Career statistics ==
As of 26 March 2018.

Club statistics
Club	Season	League			Cup (Note: Includes the Copa Argentina)		League Cup		Continental		Other		Total	
Club	Season	Division	Apps	Goals	Apps	Goals	Apps	Goals	Apps	Goals	Apps	Goals	Apps	Goals
Once Tigres	2013–14	Torneo Argentino B	38	3	0	0	—		—		0	0	38	3
Career total			38	3	0	0	—		—		0	0	38	3

== Honours ==
Sarmiento

- Primera B Metropolitana: 2011–12
