= Jorge Márquez (footballer, born 1990) =

Mexican footballer

Jorge Marquez
Personal information
- Full name: Jorge Eduardo Marquez de Leon
- Date of birth: 3 January 1989 (age 37)
- Place of birth: Torreon, Coahuila, Mexico
- Height: 1.78 m (5 ft 10 in)
- Position: Striker

Senior career*
Years	Team	Apps	(Gls)
2008–2010	Atlético Lagunero	17	(1)
2011	Puebla	0	(0)
2012	Chivas USA Reserves		
2013–2014	Veracruz II		
- * Club domestic league appearances and goals

Jorge Eduardo Márquez (born 3 January 1989) is a Mexican former footballer who played mainly as a striker.

== Club career ==
He started off his football career at Atlético Lagunero who play in the Mexican second division. He was invited by Puebla FC to pre season camp on 3 June 2011 where he earned a spot in the first club's squad.
