= Thomasson (surname) =

Thomasson is a surname. Notable people with the surname include:

- Ben Thomasson, character in Men in Trees, American romantic television dramedy series on ABC
- Benny Thomasson (1909–1984), American fiddler in the Texas style of old-time fiddling
- Franklin Thomasson (1873–1941), English 19th century MP
- Gary Thomasson (born 1951), former outfielder in Major League Baseball
- Hughie Thomasson (1952–2007), American guitarist and singer, founding member of Outlaws
- Joe Thomasson (born 1993), American basketball player in the Israel Basketball Premier League
- John Pennington Thomasson (1841–1904), English cotton spinner and Liberal Party politician
- Marianne Lindsten-Thomasson (1909–1979), Swedish physician, first female district medical officer during the 1940s
- Sarah Thomasson (1925–1996), Swedish alpine skier
- Thomas Thomasson (1808–1876), political economist and a campaigner for the repeal of the Corn Laws
- William Thomasson (1797–1882), U.S. Representative from Kentucky

== See also ==
- Thomasson (disambiguation)
- Thomason (surname)
- MacTavish (surname)
- McTavish, a related given name
- Tavish, a related given name
- Clan MacTavish, An Ancient Scottish Highlands Clan
