= McTavish =

McTavish or MacTavish is a Scottish and Irish surname, it is one Anglicised form of the Gaelic MacThàmhais, i.e. son of Thomas.

Notable people with the surname include:

- Bob McTavish (born 1944), Australian surfboard designer
- Bob McTavish (footballer) (1888–1972), Scottish footballer
- Bruce McTavish (1940–2025), New Zealand boxing referee
- Dale McTavish (born 1972), Canadian professional ice hockey player
- Devon McTavish (born 1984), American professional soccer player
- George Archibald McTavish (1856–1886), farmer and politician
- Gord McTavish (born 1954), Canadian professional ice hockey player
- Gordon McTavish (1925–2019), Canadian curler and judge
- Graham McTavish (born 1961), Scottish actor and voice actor
- Jessie McTavish, Scottish nurse convicted in 1974 of murdering a patient with insulin
- John McTavish (footballer, born 1885) (1885–1944), Scottish footballer
- John McTavish (footballer, born 1932) (1932–2025), Scottish footballer
- John McTavish (politician), Canadian politician
- Mason McTavish (born 2003), Swiss professional ice hockey player
- Megan McTavish (born 1949), American television actress
- Saunders McTavish, pen name of early settler, businessman and politician William Storrie in the colony of South Australia (c. 1832 − 19 June 1900)
- Simon McTavish (1750–1804), Scots-Canadian businessman, fur trader, and philanthropist
- Vladimir McTavish (1955/1956–2026), Scottish comedian
- Waldo McTavish Skillings (1906–1981), politician and insurance agent

== See also ==
- École McTavish Junior High Public School
- McTavish reservoir
- McTavish Street
- Clan MacTavish
- Tavish, a related given name
