= Lachlan MacTavish of Dunardry =

19th Hereditary Chief of Clan MacTavish

- Born: 1740; Scotland
- Died: 16 September 1796 (aged 55–56); Edinburgh, Scotland
- Resting place: Greyfriars Kirkyard, Edinburgh
- Known for: 19th Hereditary Chief of Clan MacTavish; Formally matriculated arms of MacTavish of Dunardry at the Court of the Lord Lyon in April 1793

Lachlan MacTavish of Dunardry (1740 – 16 September 1796) was the 19th Hereditary Chief of Clan MacTavish of Dunardry in Knapdale, Argyll, Scotland. He is notable as the first MacTavish chief to formally matriculate his arms (the arms of MacTavish of Dunardry) at the Court of the Lord Lyon, and as the last chief to reside at the ancient MacTavish seat of Dunardry before its sale in 1785.

== 19th Chief of Clan MacTavish ==
Lachlan MacTavish succeeded his father Dugald MacTavish the 18th Chief as the 19th Chief of Clan MacTavish in 1770. He inherited the ancestral MacTavish seat at Dunardry — Dùn Àrd-Rìgh, meaning Fort of the High King — in Knapdale, Argyll, where the clan was known to reside since approximately 893 AD.

== Matriculation of Arms ==
In 1793, Lachlan approached the Court of the Lord Lyon to formally matriculate the MacTavish arms — the first formal armorial registration in the clan's history. The motivation came from his kinsman Simon McTavish of Montreal, co-founder of the North West Company and at that time one of the wealthiest men in Canada, who wrote to Lachlan inquiring about the MacTavish arms. Lachlan described Simon as "a kinsman of mine who has lately made his appearance in England with an immense Fortune, acquired in the wilds of North America, who has put upon me to take out Arms."

The arms were granted by John Hooke-Campbell, Lord Lyon King of Arms, and recorded in the Public Register of All Arms and Bearings in Scotland, Volume 1, Folio 563, dated 17 April 1793. The blazon was: Quarterly, 1st and 4th a Gyronny of eight Sable and Or; 2nd and 3rd Argent a buck's head cabossed Gules attired Or on a chief engrailed Azure a cross crosslet fitchée between two mullets Or. Crest: a boar's head erased Or langued Gules. Motto: NON OBLITUS.

Arms were simultaneously matriculated for Simon McTavish of Garthbeg as a cadet of the House of Dunardry, enclosed in a bordure indicating junior status. Patrick L. Thompson, Seannachie to the 27th Chief of Clan MacTavish, documents that Lord Lyon Hooke-Campbell's appointment was politically motivated and that the gyronny of Campbell heraldry was included in the arms, likely reflecting that the MacTavishes had become a vassal clan under the feudal system rather than any genealogical connection.

== Financial Difficulties and Sale of Dunardry ==
Lachlan MacTavish's finances collapsed under debts connected to the estate of Duncan Campbell of Kilduskland, who died in 1766. Two Court of Session decisions found MacTavish liable to Kilduskland's niece, Elizabeth MacDonald of Largie, and nephew, Ronald Campbell, for an amount that exceeded four times the annual rent collected from the Dunardry estate. This annual rental sum was noted as £392 in the Edinburgh Evening Courant 1785 sale advertisement.

On 5 November 1785, the Estate of Dunardry was advertised for sale by public auction in the Edinburgh Evening Courant. The estate was purchased initially by Campbell of Barbeck, and subsequently in 1799 by Simon McTavish of Montreal — six years after work had begun on the Crinan Canal, which divided the Dunardry estate. The canal's subsequent construction destroyed the castle ruins — workers used the castle stonework to fill a break in the canal bank. In 2021, during a £4 million renovation of the Crinan Canal, the canal was drained and the submerged remains of the castle became visible for the first time in centuries.

Following the sale, Lachlan MacTavish, his wife Mary, and their three-year-old son Dugald moved to Edinburgh, where Lachlan served as surveyor of the window tax and as an ensign in the Regiment of Royal Edinburgh Volunteers.

The purchase of the Dunardry lands by Simon McTavish did not constitute a transfer of the chiefship, which passes through documented genealogical descent confirmed at the Court of the Lord Lyon and not through property transaction. No deed of resignation or nomination transferring the chiefship from Dunardry to Garthbeg was ever recorded at the Court of the Lord Lyon.

== Death and Burial ==
Lachlan MacTavish died in Edinburgh on Friday, 16 September 1796, and was buried the following day with military honours, attended by members of the Royal Edinburgh Volunteers. His burial is recorded in the Greyfriars Kirkyard register as taking place on 17 September 1796 in the "Middle of Kincaid's Ground," near the 17th-century monument to Dr. Michael Young and Thomas Kincaid of Auchinreoch. No individual grave marker for Lachlan is known to survive.

His testament testamentar (his will) was registered in the Commissary Court of Edinburgh on 17 December 1796.

== Legacy ==
The Dunardry Estate eventually passed back to Lachlan's son, Sheriff Dugald MacTavish of Dunardry, who sold it to Malcolm of Poltalloch in 1823. Sheriff Dugald served as Sheriff Substitute at Campbeltown, Kintyre, and as Writer to the Signet, and resided at Kilchrist Castle near Campbeltown. In a letter dated 18 February 1845, he wrote of the MacTavish chiefly line: "twenty-one generations from father to son without an instance of collateral or female succession." He died in 1855 and is buried at the MacTavish chiefs' burial ground at Kilmartin Churchyard, North Knapdale, Argyll.

Lachlan's grandson William MacTavish became the 21st Chief and rose to prominence in Canada as Governor of Assiniboia and Rupert's Land for the Hudson's Bay Company. The chiefly line was eventually restored when Lord Lyon Sir Malcolm Innes of Edingight formally matriculated Edward Stewart Dugald MacTavish of Dunardry as the 26th Chief on 23 July 1997, ending a dormancy that had begun when William MacTavish died without matriculating the arms in 1870.

Lachlan's son John George McTavish subsequently became a fur trader with the North West Company under Simon McTavish's patronage.

== See also ==
- Clan MacTavish
- Simon McTavish (fur trader)
- John George McTavish
- Sheriff Dugald MacTavish of Dunardry
- Court of the Lord Lyon
- MacTavish Surname

Preceded by Dugald MacTavish, 18th Chief	19th Hereditary Chief of Clan MacTavish; 1770–1796	Succeeded by Sheriff Dugald MacTavish, 20th Chief
