= William Mactavish =

Scottish colonial governor and 21st Chief of Clan MacTavish

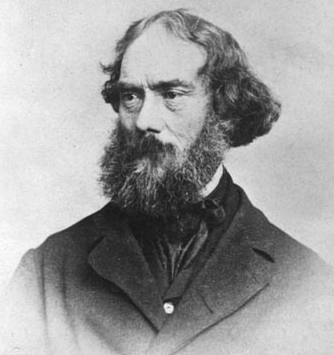
- Mactavish around 1865

Governor of Assiniboia
- In office 9 December 1858 – 15 January 1870
- Preceded by: Francis Godschall Johnson
- Succeeded by: Office abolished

Personal details
- Born: 29 March 1815 Edinburgh, Scotland
- Died: 23 July 1870 (aged 55) Liverpool, England
- Spouse: Mary Sarah MacDermot
- Children: 4
- Known for: 21st Hereditary Chief of Clan MacTavish

William Mactavish (29 March 1815 – 23 July 1870) was a Scottish Hudson's Bay Company clerk, accountant, and chief trader. He was also the 21st Hereditary Chief of Clan MacTavish. Mainly known for his dual-position as Governor of Assiniboia, and Governor of Rupert's Land, he played a major role in the development of Western Canada. Mactavish is frequently criticized for his role in the Red River Rebellion.

== Biography ==
=== Early life ===
Mactavish was born in Edinburgh, Scotland, on 29 March 1815, to Dugald and Letitia Mactavish. His father, Sheriff Dugald MacTavish, the 20th Hereditary Chief of Clan MacTavish, rebuilt Kilchrist Castle, near Campbeltown, in 1834, and it served as the family residence until Dugald's death there in 1855. He had 5 brothers and 3 sisters, and has been described as having a certain energy and large personality that is associated with a large family. According to one of his sisters, Letitia Mactavish Hargrave, William was much of an outdoorsman. In his early years, Mactavish was often found in the outdoors, hunting, trapping, fishing, and exploring nature; he had a major love for fishing and hunting, and a passion for all things outdoors. Letitia also described him as having a good sense of humour, and that he was a "dreamer." Further, she wrote about her brother, that William had a passion for wanting to better the human race, and had a desire to help those who needed it in his eyes. Letitia characterized William as, "the greatest and hardest worker [among the family and siblings] as well as having the best head." He has been regarded as being intelligent, well educated, and having integrity and goodness. One of Mactavish's uncle regarded him as being "well-educated," however he wondered how Scottish education would fare for Mactavish's well-being in the vastly socially different climate of Canada.

=== Personal life ===
In Scotland, Mactavish lived the life of bachelorhood. He had been very convinced of his single life, and was even quoted as saying, "I intend to remain as I am, single." Mactavish lived the life of bachelorhood to such an extent, that he had three supposed children in Scotland, that would be considered 'illegitimate' because they were out of wedlock. Mactavish was intent on his bachelorhood, until he met his wife, Mary Sarah McDermot, often referred to as just Sarah. With Sarah, William had four "country-born" children, two boys, and two twin girls, named James, Mary and Florence, and Andrew.

His marriage to Sarah is often discussed as crucial for many reasons. The first being that it ended his determined life of being single. The second reason is that Sarah was a Métis, or 'Mixed-Blood', Catholic woman, where he was a Protestant, Scottish man. As well, Sarah was at least thirteen years younger than William, as she was born between the years 1828 and 1841. Exact details about Sarah and William's life remain vague, due to the lack of information in Sarah's history. Finally, Mactavish seldom talked about his marriage; in fact, he neglected to discuss the news of his wedding in any prompt manner.

In the later years of his life, he suffered with debilitating advanced Tuberculosis. In May 1870, Mactavish left Canada in hopes of traveling home to Scotland. Unfortunately, William did not make it home, and died in Liverpool, England on 23 July of the same year.

=== Early career ===
Mactavish began his career in Canada in 1833 in the HBC as a clerk at the Norway House trading post, but was shortly transferred to the York Factory trading post. As a clerk, Mactavish did accounting, inventory, and shipping, and worked long hours, often from 4:30 am until 8 pm. He continued his job as a clerk for 11 years, after which he was promoted and performed as an accountant from 1845 until 1846. In 1846 he was appointed as Chief Trader, and in 1847, he was transferred to Chief Trader at the Fort Garry trading post. For two years starting in 1848 he was acting as in charge of the Sault Ste. Marie trading post, and in 1851 he was made in charge of York Factory.

His uncle, John George Mactavish, the younger son of William's grandfather Lachlan MacTavish, the 19th Chief of Clan MacTavish, was a chief trader in the HBC, and was the reason that he was able to get his original job as a clerk. John George had Mactavish transferred to York Factory in order to work under James Hargrave, who was the Chief Trader of York Factory at the time. Hargrave was determined to have William be his successor as chief trader of York Factory, so Hargrave and John George often discussed of Mactavish with Governor George Simpson (HBC administrator), in hopes of persuading him in favour of William. While Hargrave was on leave, Simpson appointed Mactavish as in charge of York Factory, and was later placed as in charge of Sault Ste. Marie the year after. Mactavish had a pessimism for his future in the company and his advancement, because he did not like politics, however John George, Hargrave, and Simpson all had high hopes for him. Mactavish believed that the HBC had dim prospects, because eventually the government would end the monopoly that had been created out of the fur trade, and therefore he saw little gain in the advancing in the company.

=== Politics ===
==== Political career ====
On 9 December 1858, Mactavish was appointed the role of Governor of Assiniboia. When he arrived in Red River, he was reported as having energy, determination, and good mental character. Mactavish believed that the political realm of his title was not a position that he would excel in. Mactavish felt that the position as a "stoker in hell" would have been more appealing than Governor of Assiniboia. Mactvish viewed political life as disgusting, and was "anxious" for the appointment to be over. Mactavish was very open and clear in his dissatisfaction with the job. Due to his Métis wife, and his career in the HBC and the fur trade, Mactavish had Métis sympathies, and in the political climate of the time, siding with the Métis would create conflict. Further, the HBC was an unpopular administration at the time, because the rising popular interest was in the annexing of Red River, and Mactavish just simply did not want to deal with it. Regardless of his hatred for his job, Mactavish performed well, and created a great deal of positivity in the settlement. He made many changes in the settlement, including the implementation of a semi-weekly mail, and developing Fort Garry as a central point of business, which, in turn, increased the importance of the settlement.

In order to adhere to George Simpson's wishes, William was given the title of Governor of Rupert's Land when Simpson died. When he took on this new role, he was not as reluctant as he was when he was moved to Red River. This was because of his Métis sympathies, and his enjoyment and skill for the career in the fur trade, and the fact that it was less of a political role. At that point, then, it meant that Mactavish was the governor of both Assiniboia and Rupert's Land, which created a clash in his ideologies.

During his time as Governor as Assiniboia, he was unsuccessful on two accounts. The first being his inability to build a British military force for Assiniboia; and the second being his inability to turn the small remaining support for the HBC administration, into a larger widespread support system. However, that being said, he was still well-respected, especially in his title of Governor of Rupert's Land.

==== Political ideology ====
Being the governor of both Assiniboia and Rupert's Land created an issue in Mactavish's career, as he believed that the fur trade and the settlement should not fall under the same political sphere, much less one single person. He had a tendency to put the needs of the people of Assiniboia first, rather than thinking about the entirety of a political scheme. Mactavish believed that the Métis had a right to their own land, and, further, he criticized the Canadian government for their lack of consultation in the proposed transfer of Rupert's Land to Canada, and later objected the discussion. Mactavish had such a distaste for politics that he refused to even engage in the political aspect of his job. In regards to his political life, Mactavish was quoted as saying that he does not want his words to be misconstrued, and that he, "declines to say anything whatever on political matters."

==== Red River Rebellion ====
On 16 November 1869, Mactavish released a statement in regards to the eminent Red River Rebellion, notifying the inhabitants of Red River and Assiniboia about what was happening in regards to the events surrounding Red River. Mactavish outlined six important issues, that were, in his opinion, what the Red River Rebellion encompassed:

1. There was a blockade on the road leading into the settlement.
2. There was stolen goods and merchandise from the settlement.
3. There had been a tampering with the mail in the settlement.
4. There was a forced entrance into the settlement.
5. The conflict forced HBC men to flee to American territory.
6. The intention was to stop the transfer of Rupert's Land to the government of Canada.

Mactavish encouraged the population of Red River to protest the rebellion, in hopes of minimizing conflict. As well, Mactavish asked the rebels to leave peacefully, because the conflict could result in "incalculable good or immeasurable evil." This proclamation was the only thing that Mactavish did in regards to the Red River Rebellion, which is where the controversy surrounding him lays, because he did very little, if anything, to exercise his power. Red River was almost solely reliant on the HBC in economic terms, in that Red River was created as a fur trading settlement. This created conflict between his two positions as Governor of Assiniboia and Rupert's Land. Mactavish was afraid to put his Métis sympathies into use, for fear of causing even more trouble. Rather than putting his power as Governor into use, he focused instead on smaller minute details, aud this was the cause for his eventual demise. Being governor of both Assiniboia and Rupert's land, he had a considerable power in both the political sphere and fur trading realm of Canadian society, and this power could have made effective effort to stop the Red River Rebellion. It has been noted that he suspected a political uprising, but chose not to report it to Ottawa. His lack of action and his hatred for politics was a major factor in why the Red River Rebellion continued. Many chief traders, and other high up men in the HBC, mad very public their aversion to how Mactavish handled the political situation that was the Red River Rebellion.

At the height of the Rebellion, Mactavish was taken prisoner by Louis Riel. Mactavish was both physically imprisoned, as well as simply bed ridden from his deteriorating health, as he was battling advanced tuberculosis at the time. While imprisoned, and before he left for Scotland to die at home, Mactavish still acted with his Métis sympathies, and tried his best to continue to govern the land by authorizing loans to the Métis. He believed that rest would return him to his, "old robustness of constitution."

=== 21st Chief of Clan MacTavish ===
William Mactavish was the 21st Hereditary Chief of Clan MacTavish, succeeding his father Sheriff Dugald MacTavish, who is buried at the MacTavish chiefs' burial ground at Kilmartin Churchyard, North Knapdale, Argyll. The MacTavish chiefly line traced an unbroken descent from father to son — documented in a letter written by Sheriff Dugald in 1845 describing "twenty-one generations from father to son without an instance of collateral or female succession."

William did not formally matriculate the MacTavish chiefly arms at the Court of the Lord Lyon; his death in 1870, two days after returning to Britain from Canada, precluded the opportunity, and the chiefship was thereafter considered dormant by the Lord Lyon. The chiefship remained dormant through several subsequent generations until his sister Letitia's published letters led historian Margaret Arnett MacLeod to identify the family's chiefly descent in the early 1950s, ultimately resulting in Lord Lyon Sir Malcolm Innes of Edingight formally matriculating Edward Stewart Dugald MacTavish of Dunardry as the 26th Chief of Clan MacTavish on 23 July 1997.

=== Reception and legacy ===
As a governor, he was viewed by the citizens of Red River as having, "admirable traits," "kind considerations," and "great wishes." Further, his reception is summed in a sense of "general satisfaction - so much so that the Red River [population] would be loathe to exchange him for any other."

While he is often criticized for his lack of action in the eminency of the Red River Rebellion, he is also often met with positive reactions. When he died, the flags in Fort Garry and Winnipeg flew at half mast, in mourning of Mactavish. Further, upon his death, he was vastly grieved, and the New Nation Newspaper wrote that his death will, "spread a gloom of sorrow from one end of this country to the other and to many will bring grief and pain."

== See also ==
- Clan MacTavish
- Lachlan MacTavish of Dunardry
- Sheriff Dugald MacTavish of Dunardry
- John George McTavish
- Simon McTavish
- MacTavish (Surname)

Preceded by Sheriff Dugald MacTavish, 20th Chief	21st Hereditary Chief of Clan MacTavish; 1855–1870	Succeeded by Dr. James William MacTavish, 22nd Chief
