= Tavish =

Tavish is a masculine given name of English, Scottish Gaelic and Aramaic origin. It is the anglicized form of Tàmhas or Tòmas, which is the Scottish Gaelic form of the given name Thomas.

Tavish is a Sanskrit word which means strong, energetic, courageous, forceful.

Tavish, in Hindi, means "Heaven" or "Swarg". Tavish is a name that, in an Indian/Sanskrit context, is commonly understood to mean “strong, energetic, and courageous,” and is sometimes associated with “heaven” or a powerful, vibrant presence.

== People ==
- Tavish Finnegan DeGroot: fictional character from the 2007 video game Team Fortress 2
- Tavish Scott (b. 1966): Scottish politician

== See also ==
- MacTavish (disambiguation), a related surname
- McTavish (disambiguation)
- Clan MacTavish
