= Sheriff Dugald MacTavish of Dunardry =

20th Hereditary Chief of Clan MacTavish

- Born: 1781; Dunardry, Knapdale, Argyll, Scotland
- Died: 20 July 1855 (aged 73–74); Kilchrist Castle, near Campbeltown, Kintyre, Scotland
- Resting place: Kilmartin Churchyard, North Knapdale, Argyll
- Occupations: Sheriff Substitute, Writer to the Signet
- Known for: 20th Hereditary Chief of Clan MacTavish

Sheriff Dugald MacTavish of Dunardry (1781 – 20 July 1855) was the 20th Hereditary Chief of Clan MacTavish, Sheriff Substitute at Campbeltown, Kintyre, and Writer to the Signet. He was the son and successor of Lachlan MacTavish of Dunardry, the 19th Chief, who formally matriculated the MacTavish chiefly arms at the Court of the Lord Lyon in 1793.

== Early life and family ==
Dugald MacTavish was born in 1781 at Dunardry in Knapdale, Argyll — Dùn an Àird Righ, the Fort of the High King — the ancient ancestral seat of the Chiefs of Clan MacTavish, documented in the hands of the MacTavish chiefs since approximately 893 AD. He was the eldest son of Lachlan MacTavish of Dunardry, the 19th Chief, who was forced to sell the Dunardry estate in 1785 due to financial difficulty. Following the sale, the family moved to Edinburgh, where Lachlan was installed as Governor of Taxes for the Crown at St. James' Court, just off the Royal Mile. Lachlan died in 1796 and is entombed at Greyfriars Cemetery, Edinburgh.

Dugald's younger brother was John George McTavish, who joined the North West Company in 1798 under the patronage of Simon McTavish of Montreal.

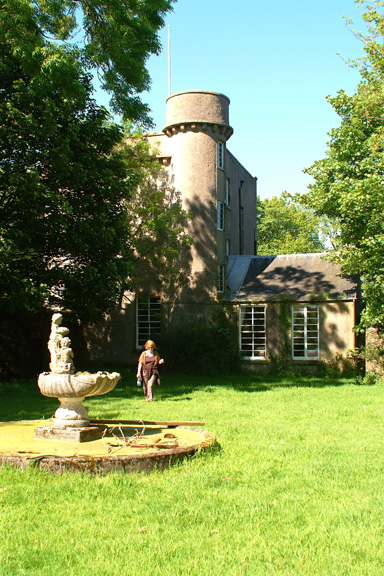
Kilchrist Castle

Dugald's daughter Letitia Hargrave married James Hargrave of the Hudson's Bay Company; her published letters are a significant primary source for 19th-century Canadian fur-trade life. It was while editing these letters for publication in the early 1950s that historian Margaret Arnett MacLeod identified the MacTavish chiefly descent and alerted the Lord Lyon King of Arms — setting in motion the process that ended nearly 200 years of dormancy with the 1997 restoration of the chiefship.

== Career ==
Dugald MacTavish served as Sheriff Substitute at Campbeltown, Kintyre, and as Writer to the Signet. He repurchased the Dunardry estate from Simon McTavish Jr. and subsequently sold it to Malcolm of Poltalloch in 1823. His legal estate papers record him as MacTavish of Dunardry.

He resided at Kilchrist Castle, near Campbeltown, which was rebuilt in 1834.

A 1752 Precept of Clare Constat by the Duke of Argyll names his father "Dugald McTavish" as son and heir of "Archibald McCawis alias McTavish" — the first document in the Dunardry series to use the modern MacTavish spelling, marking the point at which the anglicised form replaced the older Gaelic variants McCawis and McCavis in formal legal instruments.

== The MacTavish of Dunardry Tartan ==
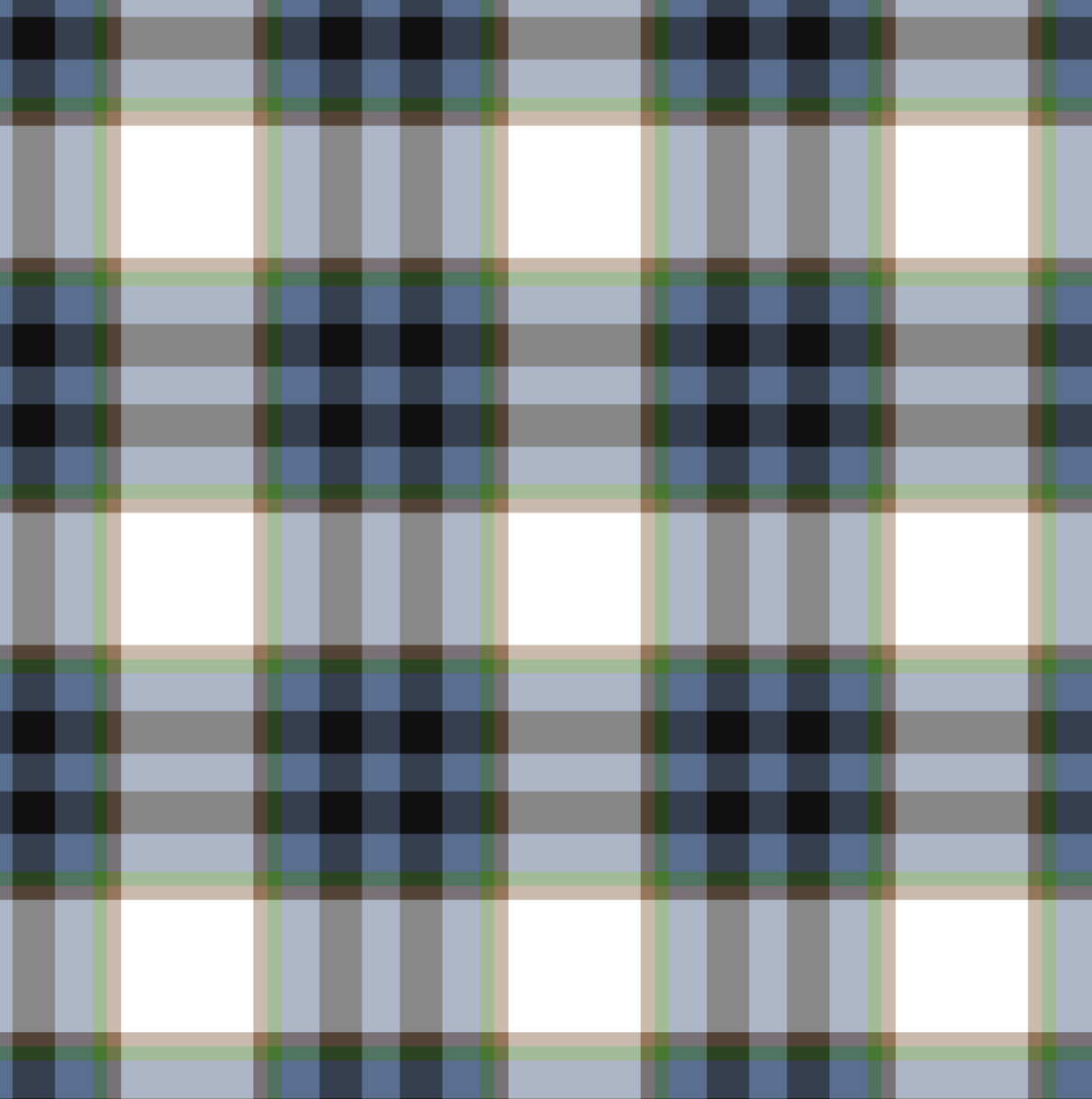
MacTavish of Dunardry Dress Tartan. SRT ref. 10731, registered 2012.

In a letter dated 18 February 1845, preserved in the National Library and Archives of Canada, Ottawa, Sheriff Dugald wrote to his son William — who would become the 21st Chief and Governor of Rupert's Land for the Hudson's Bay Company — describing what he understood to be the authentic Dunardry Tartan: "I am told the clothiers sell a Tartan they call MacTavish but from what I hear it little resembles the set [sic sett] which my grandmother (who was the eldest daughter of the chief of MacLachlan) considered the Dunardry Tartan & which she said should have as much white as there was yellow in the MacLachlan tartan."

This letter formed the basis for the later registration of the MacTavish of Dunardry Dress Tartan with the Scottish Register of Tartans (ref. 10731) in 2012, with the tartan date recorded as 18 February 1845.

== Chiefly line ==
In a letter dated 18 February 1845, Sheriff Dugald wrote of the MacTavish chiefly line: "twenty-one generations from father to son without an instance of collateral or female succession." He was succeeded as 21st Chief by his son William MacTavish, who became Governor of Rupert's Land and Assiniboia for the Hudson's Bay Company.

== Death and burial ==
Sheriff Dugald MacTavish died on 20 July 1855 at Kilchrist Castle, near Campbeltown, Kintyre. He is buried at Kilmartin Churchyard, North Knapdale, Argyll — the ancient burial ground of the Chiefs of Clan MacTavish.

== See also ==
- Clan MacTavish
- Lachlan MacTavish of Dunardry
- William MacTavish
- Kilchrist Castle
- Kilmartin

Preceded by Lachlan MacTavish, 19th Chief	20th Hereditary Chief of Clan MacTavish; 1796–1855	Succeeded by William Mactavish, 21st Chief
