= Simon McTavish (fur trader) =

Scottish-born fur trader

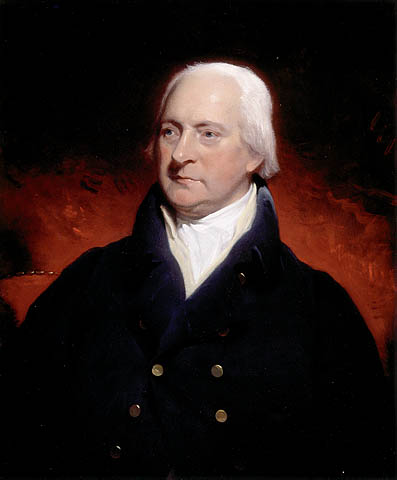
- Born: ca. 1750; Stratherrick, Inverness
- Died: 6 July 1804 (aged 53–54); Montreal, Lower Canada
- Resting place: Golden Square Mile
- Citizenship: British
- Occupation: Chief partner of the North West Company
- Successor: His nephew, William McGillivray
- Spouse: Marie-Marguerite Chaboillez

Simon McTavish (c.1750 – 6 July 1804), of Montreal was a Scottish-born fur trader and the chief founding partner of the North West Company. He was a member of the Beaver Club and was known as the Marquis for his pre-eminent position in the fur trade and his refined style of living.

Both McTavish Street and the McTavish Reservoir in Montreal are named for him. His home and monument in the Golden Square Mile were longstanding landmarks in Montreal.

Renowned for his generosity, when the Chief of the Clan MacTavish had fallen on hard times and was forced to sell their seat, Dunardry, McTavish bought it back for the clan and gave his eldest son employment in Montreal.

== Highlands Background ==
In 1751, Simon McTavish was born at Stratherrick in the Scottish Highlands, the son of John McTavish (1701–1774), tacksman of Garthbeg, who bore the arms of the McTavishes of Garthbeg. His mother, Mary Fraser (1716–1770) of Garthmore, was said to be descended through Simon Fraser of Dunchea and the Frasers of Foyers, from an illegitimate son of the 1st Lord Lovat — a claim of descent that has not been independently verified.

In the Jacobite rising of 1745, John McTavish had fought as an officer with the Jacobite armies at the Battles of Culloden and Falkirk Muir. He was one of the few who were specifically named as to not receive a pardon from George II after the Jacobites were defeated.

In 1757, General Simon Fraser of Lovat appointed John McTavish a Lieutenant in his newly raised 78th Fraser Highlanders. Apparently changing his name to 'Fraser' so as to escape the authorities, Simon's father went with the regiment to Nova Scotia and fought for the British at the Battle of Louisburg, where he was severely wounded and left. Unable to fight at the Battle of Quebec, he was only well enough to be sent home "as an act of charity to him and his family" in 1761.

Simon's two elder brothers were taken into the care of their father's friend, Dugald MacTavish of Dunardry, Chief of the Clan MacTavish, and in 1764, at the age of thirteen, young Simon was sent to New York with his sister and her husband, Hugh Fraser (1730-1814) of Brightmoney, Captain in the 78th Fraser Highlanders.

== North American fur trade ==
Having found an apprenticeship with a Scots merchant at New York, McTavish recognized the opportunities offered by the fur trade. By 1769, he was working for himself and in 1772 he went into partnership with William Edgar (1736-1820) at Detroit. In the Niagara Region, it was said he started trading in deerskins and muskrats, and only later became involved with the more valuable furs.

Over the next few years, McTavish prospered in the trading of furs, and in 1773, with a new partner, James Bannerman, he extended his operations to Grand Portage on Lake Superior. At that important fur trade rendezvous, while other American traders concentrated on the south and west, McTavish understood that he would have access to fur pelts that were found in much greater quantity and were of better quality in the colder climate north west of the Great Lakes.

Although at the time the Hudson's Bay Company controlled the prime north-westerly areas for fur trapping, there was still a relatively lucrative route from Montreal westward via the Ottawa River and out across Georgian Bay and the Great Lakes Region and into Manitoba. Most of the trade at Grand Portage went through Montreal.

In 1775–76, McTavish had the great fortune to winter at Detroit, well stocked with trade goods for the next season, he made an expedition with George McBeath. The American Continental Army occupied Montreal that winter, preventing the Montreal traders from getting their goods to Grand Portage in the summer of 1776. This enabled McTavish, with little competition, to obtain furs which he valued at £15,000 and took to England to sell in a high market.

== Montreal ==
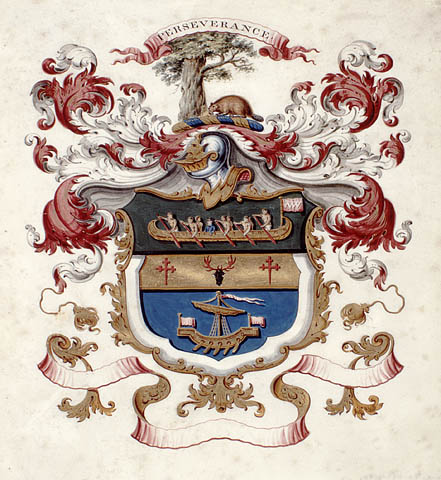
North West Company - Coat of Arms

In the meantime, the Americans had withdrawn from Quebec, and McTavish transferred his operations to Montreal. He continued to trade on his own through the Revolutionary War, supplying goods both at Grand Portage and Detroit, and speculating in rum for the British soldiers at Detroit and Niagara. By the end of the war, he was able to put together a group of business investors and trapper/explorers to create the North West Company. With the Frobisher brothers he owned 37.5% of the company's shares and upon the death of Benjamin Frobisher in 1787 McTavish became the man in charge of the business.

A restructuring of the company a few months later saw the shrewd McTavish gain control of eleven of the company's twenty shares. Most important, he was managing partner of a new Montreal firm, McTavish, Frobisher and Company, which imported the North West Company's goods and forwarded its furs to the London market, taking commissions on all transactions. The vertical integration of the business was extended in 1792, when the firm of McTavish, Fraser and Company was established in London itself, to procure the trade goods at source and sell the furs. From his headquarters in Montreal, over the next sixteen years McTavish built a business empire that stretched from the Labrador coast to the Rocky Mountains and in the process made himself a wealthy man.

As the fur trade expanded across Rupert's Land, the HBC's financial dominance allowed them to take the advantage. The HBC had rejected the Nor’Westers’ request for the right to bring in goods via Hudson Bay, so at a great cost of £45,000 McTavish sent two expeditions to establish footholds for the NWC. These actions did not bring the desired effect and the NWC also failed in receiving a charter from the British government, leaving just one alternative — an attempt to purchase a majority of the shares in the HBC.

During his time in Britain, Simon McTavish had befriended the chief of Clan MacTavish, and on the chief's death, Simon brought one of the sons into the North West Company. In 1799, McTavish did something that gave him great personal satisfaction: the acquisition of the Dunardary estate in North Knapdale, Argyll, which had been the ancestral home for the heads of the McTavish (MacTavish) clan for several hundred years. Although Simon's own family had been closely associated with clan Fraser, it is believed that his ancestors were a branch of the McTavish clan of Dunardary, who had settled in Stratherrick some generations before.

McTavish purchased the seigneury of Terrebonne in 1802, where he built two flour-mills, a bakery, and a sawmill. Other entrepreneurs subsequently began the manufacturing of wooden barrels.

== Dunardry and the Chiefs of Clan MacTavish ==
In 1782, Simon's father's friend and the guardian of Simon's two elder brothers, Dugald MacTavish, former Lieutenant in the 3rd Foot Guards and the 18th Chief of Clan MacTavish, died. In 1785, Dugald's son and heir, Lachlan MacTavish of Dunardry, the 19th Chief, was forced to sell the Dunardry estate, which had for many centuries been the ancestral home of the Chiefs of Clan MacTavish. As mentioned, Lachlan had grown up with Simon's brothers and he and Simon had become good friends over the course of Simon's many trips to Britain. Since the sale of Dunardry, Simon had pledged to his friend that he would assist him in buying back the estate, as soon as he "could with conveniency spare the money". Two years after Simon learnt of the death in 1796 of his "poor old friend Dunardry" (Lachlan), he lived up to his word and paid £6,000 to restore his clan's honour and bring Dunardry back to the rightful Chiefs. Though in name Simon had become 'of Dunardry', there was no personal gain attached to this for Simon and he viewed the purchase as a "hobby-horse".

Arms of Simon McTavish of Garthbeg, matriculated 1793 as a cadet of the House of Dunardry. The bordure Or indicates junior status within the MacTavish chiefly line.

In 1793, when Lachlan MacTavish of Dunardry formally matriculated the MacTavish chiefly arms at the Court of the Lord Lyon, arms were simultaneously granted to Simon McTavish of Garthbeg as a cadet of the House of Dunardry, enclosed in a bordure Or indicating junior status subordinate to the chiefly line. Patrick L. Thompson, Seannachie to the 27th Chief of Clan MacTavish, notes that a bordure of the second is reserved for the first offshoot of the main stem, which Garthbeg does not appear to be, and that the arms were likely matriculated in error regarding the specific bordure assigned.

Unfortunately, Simon's magnanimous gesture by the purchase of Dunardry became something of a burden to Lachlan's son as his own sons showed no interest in the running of the estate. They continued to acknowledge how very grateful they were to Simon, but as the property had ceased to be profitable, they were not eager to take ownership of the estate. As such, Simon's sons, who both died young, had been styled 'of Dunardry', even though they too had no interest in the estate and never lived there.

The purchase of Dunardry by Simon McTavish did not constitute a transfer of the chiefship of Clan MacTavish, which passes through documented genealogical descent confirmed at the Court of the Lord Lyon and not through property transaction. An examination of more than 600 documents held in the Argyll and Bute Archive at Lochgilphead found no deed of resignation, nomination, or rematriculation transferring the chiefship from the Dunardry line to the Garthbeg line. Land transaction documents are Sheriff Court instruments governing property transfer — entirely separate in Scottish law from the Lord Lyon Court's jurisdiction over chiefship succession.

Simon's friend, Lachlan MacTavish, had been succeeded as Chief by his son Dugald MacTavish (1781–1855), of Kilchrist Castle; Sheriff of Campbeltown. During his lifetime, Simon had also taken into the North West Company John George MacTavish, the second son of his friend Lachlan and therefore brother of the 20th Chief Dugald, waiving the customary cost. John George became a member of the Beaver Club and when the NWC later merged with the Hudson's Bay Company, continued to work for them as one of their top traders. He later changed the spelling of his name to 'McTavish' in honour of his benefactor Simon. John George's nephew, William MacTavish, 21st Chief of Clan MacTavish, also entered the fur trade, working for the HBC and becoming Governor of Rupert's Land and Assiniboia. The Chiefs of Clan MacTavish remained in Canada, and the present 27th Chief, Steven Edward Dugald MacTavish of Dunardry, was born at Montreal in 1951.

== Family and Monument ==
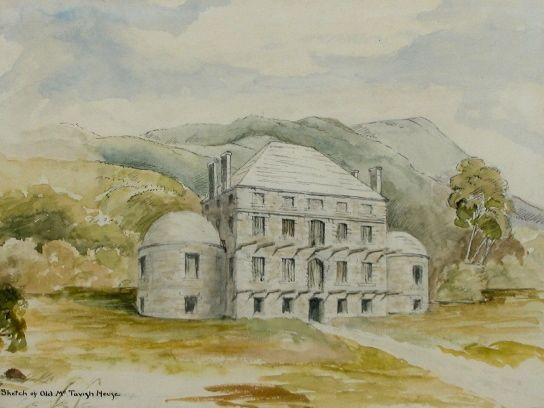
Simon McTavish's Montreal home in what would become the Golden Square Mile

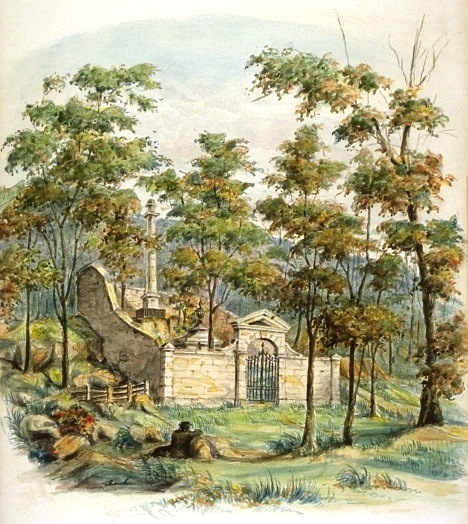
The McTavish mausoleum and monument within the grounds of his house on the slopes of Mount Royal. Torn down in the 1940s.

In October, 1793, Simon McTavish married Marie-Marguerite Chaboillez (b.1775), daughter of Charles Chaboillez, a founding member of the Beaver Club. Directly after the marriage, they moved to London, where McTavish hoped to live permanently, but his new wife became depressed there and they returned to Montreal in the spring of 1795. The McTavishes had six children, four of whom lived to adulthood, but only one married. A monument stands to their four surviving children at Chiswick Parish Church:

- Mary McTavish (1796-1819). In 1817, at Marylebone Church, she married Major Charles Pasley (1781-1821), of Gloucester Place, Portman Square, London; nephew of Admiral Sir Thomas Pasley. His first cousin, Sir John Malcolm, had previously appointed him Chargé d'affaires to Fat′h-Ali Shah Qajar of Persia on the part of the Supreme Court of India. Mary was given away by her guardian and first cousin, Simon McGillivray. She died at Sidmouth, Devon.
- William McTavish (1797-1818). On his father's death he inherited £20,000 and the disposition of 'MacTavish of Dunardry' while the estate was still between his own family and that of the Chiefs MacTavish. He died unmarried at Stroud-on-the-Green, near Kew, the home of his mother and stepfather, Major Plenderleath. William was described as 'of Dunardry' in his death notice.
- Ann McTavish (1800-1819), died unmarried at Bridport, Dorset.
- Simon McTavish (1803-1828). He inherited the rights to Dunardry from his brother but like the MacTavishes was uninterested in any claim. He died unmarried at his mother and step-father's home near Ramsgate, Kent.

Simon McTavish died in Montreal in 1804, leaving an estate of £125,000. In his will he bequeathed funds to a number of friends and relatives as well as the Hôpital Hôtel-Dieu de Montréal and the Grey Nuns' Hôpital général. McTavish Street, bordering the westerly side of McGill University was named in his honor, as was McTavish reservoir, just north of the university.

His McGillivray nephews organised his funeral, settled his will and built a memorial for him within the grounds of his house on the slopes of Mount Royal. They built a twenty-foot column enclosed by a walled mausoleum, that once occupied a prominent place in Montreal's iconography. In 1942, rather than repair the monument that had greatly suffered the effects of time due to a lack of maintenance, it was replaced it with a 5-foot granite block.

By McTavish's will, he instructed that all of his children were to be taken to England for their education, and Mrs McTavish accompanied them in 1806. At London, in 1808, she took for her second husband Major William Smith Plenderleath (1780-1845), the recognized illegitimate son and eventual heir of General Gabriel Christie, by his mistress Rachel Plenderleath.

Simon McTavish was related to many of the most important persons in the Canadian fur trade: William McGillivray, Simon McGillivray and Duncan McGillivray were his nephews; Simon Fraser, John Fraser (his London agent) and Donald McTavish were his cousins; Angus Shaw and John MacDonald of Garth were his nephews-in-law. Through his wife, MacDonald was the brother-in-law of David Thompson. Sir Alexander Mackenzie was the cousin of Roderick Mackenzie of Terrebonne, brother-in-law of McTavish's wife.

== See also ==
- William MacTavish
- Clan MacTavish
- McTavish (Surname)
- MacTavish (Surname)
