= MacTavish =

MacTavish or McTavish is a Scottish surname and Scottish Highland Clan, it is one Anglicised form of the Gaelic MacThàmhais, i.e. son of Thomas.

== People ==
=== Surname MacTavish ===
- Alastair MacTavish Dunnett (1908–1998), Scottish journalist
- Anne Mactavish, Canadian jurist
- Charles MacTavish (1818–1868), American landowner
- Craig MacTavish (born 1958), Canadian ice hockey coach
- Don MacTavish (1940–1969), American race driver
- Dugald MacTavish of Dunardry (c. 1664 – 1685) 14th Hereditary Chief of Clan MacTavish
- Sheriff Dugald MacTavish of Dunardry (1781 – 1855) 20th Hereditary Chief of Clan MacTavish
- John MacTavish (British Consul) (c. 1787–1852), Scots-Canadian fur trade entrepreneur and diplomat
- Lachlan MacTavish of Dunardry (c. 1750 – c. 1820) was the 19th Hereditary Chief of Clan MacTavish of Dunardry in Knapdale, Argyll, Scotland.
- Letitia MacTavish Hargrave (1813–1854), Scottish author
- Scott Mactavish (born 1965), American filmmaker, author, and journalist
- Shona Dunlop MacTavish (1920–2019), New Zealand dancer and teacher
- William Mactavish (1815–1870), 21st Hereditary Chief of Clan MacTavish, Scottish-born representative of the Hudson's Bay Company; governor of Rupert's Land and Assiniboia in Canada

=== Surname McTavish ===
- Simon McTavish (fur trader) (1750–1804), of Montreal was a Scottish-born fur trader and the chief founding partner of the North West Company. His two elder brothers were taken into the care of their father's friend, Dugald MacTavish of Dunardry, Chief of the Clan MacTavish
- Graham McTavish (born 1961), Scottish actor

== Fictional people ==
- Captain John "Soap" MacTavish, one of the main protagonists in Call of Duty 4: Modern Warfare, Call of Duty: Modern Warfare 2, and Call of Duty: Modern Warfare 3, and the alternative version of the same character (Sergeant Johnny "Soap" MacTavish) in the rebooted Call of Duty: Modern Warfare II and Call of Duty: Modern Warfare III games.

== Other ==
- Clan MacTavish, Scottish clan
- SS Ina Mactavish

== See also ==
- Tavish, a related given name
- Thompson (surname), an english language translation of the given name MacTavish
- Thomson (surname), an english language translation of the given name MacTavish
- MacTavish Cup, shinty
