= John George McTavish =

Scottish-born fur trader

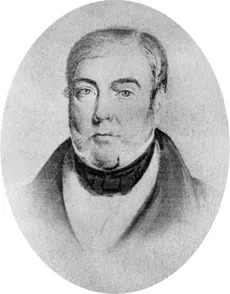
McTavish in 1821

John George McTavish (c. 1778 – 20 July 1847, also spelled MacTavish and Mactavish) was the younger son of the 19th Hereditary Chief of Clan MacTavish and a Scottish-born fur trader who played a significant role in the North West Company's activities in North America during the early 19th century. He entered the North American fur trade in 1798 with the North West Company, wherein he challenged the monopoly of the Hudson's Bay Company. Personal controversies arose from his marriages, notably abandoning his common-law wife Matooskie, an Indigenous Canadian woman, for Catherine Aitken Turner, sparking condemnation and rumours.

In the 1830s, his health declined. He died in 1847, leaving his estate to daughters from both marriages.

== Early life ==
John George McTavish was born Mactavish around 1778 at Dunardry, the ancestral seat of Clan MacTavish in Knapdale, Argyll, Scotland. His father Lachlan MacTavish of Dunardry held the title of 19th Hereditary Chief of Clan MacTavish, Chief of the Name and Arms of MacTavish, and formally matriculated the MacTavish chiefly arms at the Court of the Lord Lyon in 1793 — the first formal MacTavish arms matriculation — partly prompted by Simon McTavish's inquiry about the MacTavish arms.

In 1798, he joined the North West Company (NWC), a North American fur trading business during the late 18th and early 19th centuries. He was enlisted by Simon McTavish, a distant relative and prominent figure in the fur trade, who influenced him to subsequently spell his family name as McTavish rather than the chiefly family spelling of MacTavish. John George's nephew, William MacTavish — son of his brother Sheriff Dugald MacTavish, the 20th Chief — succeeded as the 21st Hereditary Chief of Clan MacTavish and became Governor of Rupert's Land and Assiniboia for the Hudson's Bay Company.

== Fur trade career ==
McTavish worked as a clerk at the NWC's headquarters in Montreal before taking part in an expedition to contest the monopoly of the Hudson's Bay Company (HBC) in 1803. This was done by establishing trading posts on James Bay. He was specifically stationed at Fort St. Andrews on Charlton Island, where he developed friendly relations with the HBC personnel. He often travelled to Hayes Island, near which he married Charlotte, who was the daughter of John Thomas, HBC's chief within Moose Factory. However, the NWC decided to abandon its James Bay enterprise in 1806, forcing McTavish to return to Quebec, leaving his wife in distress.

Subsequently, McTavish was assigned to posts in the British Columbia Interior, including Fort Dunvegan in 1808–1809. He attended meetings of the Beaver Club (a gentlemen's dining club in Montreal) in 1810–1811 and later joined an expedition led by John MacDonald of Garth, crossing the Rocky Mountains to give supplies the explorer David Thompson on the upper Columbia River. Following this, McTavish stayed at Spokane House for the winter, before accompanying Thompson back to Fort William in 1812. He played a crucial role in the NWC triumph over the Pacific Fur Company, negotiating the purchase of the American company's assets in 1813.

During his time at Fort Astoria in Oregon, McTavish faced managerial conflicts and tensions with local Indigenous groups. In 1814, he led an armed retaliation against a group that had attacked his company's canoes at the nearby Cascade Locks. After taking a short time on furlough, he continued his involvement in the fur trade over the following years, participating in expeditions and engaging in the conflict between the NWC and the HBC.

In 1816–1817, he was involved in other legal disputes with the HBC and was sent to England for trial. The charges against him were dismissed, and McTavish was ordered to return to Grand Rapids in Manitoba. After the union of the NWC and HBC in 1821, McTavish became a chief factor and was entrusted with managing York Factory, the main centre for the HBC's Northern Department. He gained the respect and praise of the governor George Simpson for his business acumen and efficient management.

== Marriages ==
Although involved with several Indigenous women from 1800 to 1830, McTavish married Matooskie (also known as Nancy) in 1813 à la façon du pays (a type of common-law marriage between European male fur traders and Indigenous women which was practised in the fur trade society), with whom he had seven daughters. However, in 1830, while on furlough in Scotland, McTavish abandoned Matooskie and married Catherine Aitken Turner, with whom he had two more daughters. Despite criticism, governor Simpson defended McTavish abandoning Matooskie and arranged for Matooskie's marriage to another man. However, the abandonment of Matooskie by McTavish was widely condemned, even by those who did not agree with marriage à la façon du pays. Rumours spread among the white settlers alleging McTavish's abusive behaviour and drinking habits.

After Catherine Turner died in 1841, he entered into a second marriage in 1843 to Elizabeth "Eppie" Cameron, a niece of Angus Cameron, who was a chief factor. They had another pair of daughters.

== Health decline and death ==
In the early 1830s, McTavish's health declined due to excess weight gain, and he was put on furlough again in 1835–1836. He was reassigned to the Lake of Two Mountains post, situated near Montreal. In 1837, he bought a farm at Lac des Chats in Lower Canada. After a career spanning almost half a century in the fur trade, McTavish died in 1847 following a brief illness. In his last will and testament, he divided his estate – valued at approximately £6,000 – among the daughters from his marriages to Turner and Cameron.

== See also ==
- Clan MacTavish
- William MacTavish
