= McTavish reservoir =

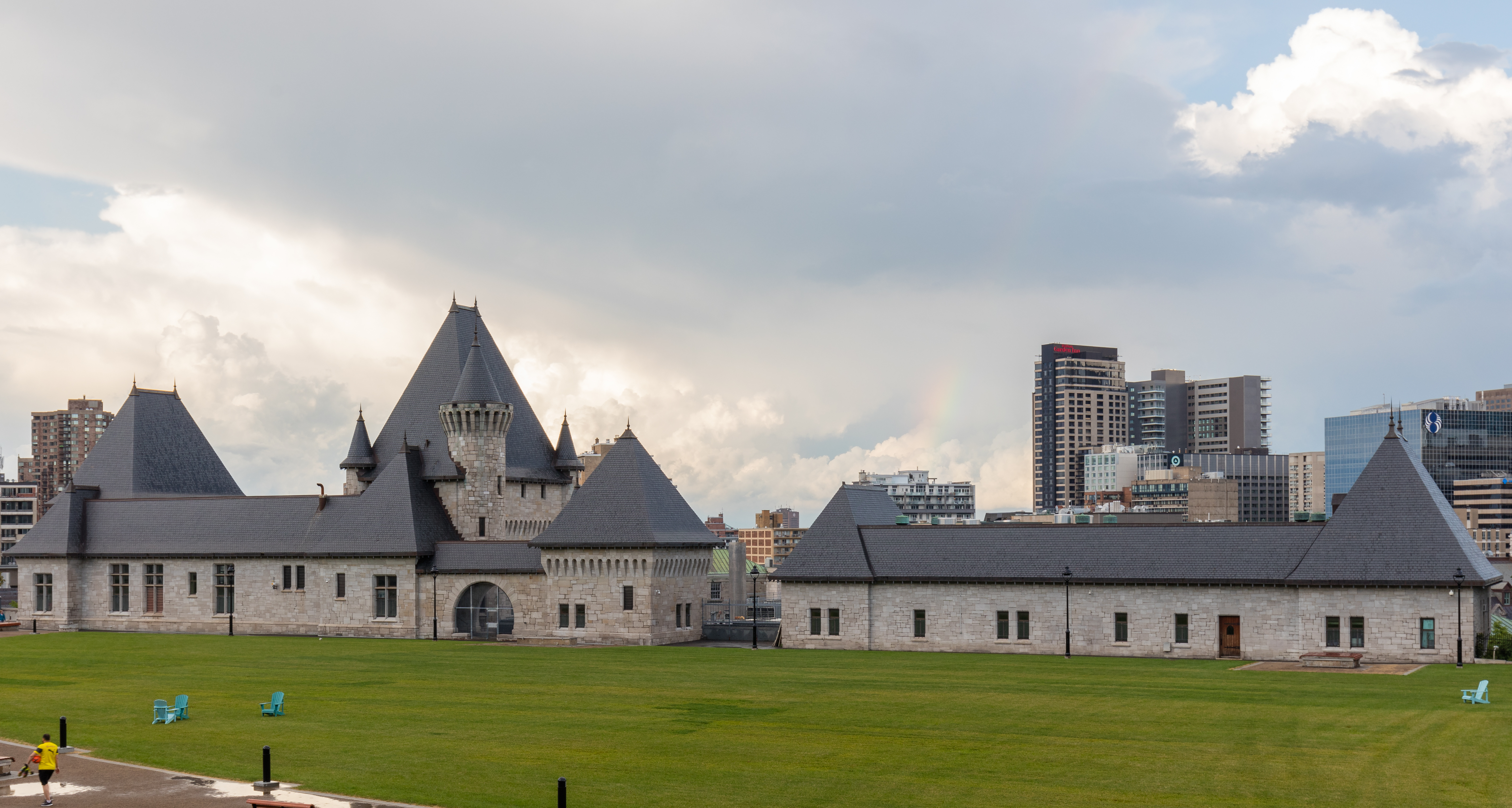
- Interactive map of the McTavish reservoir area

General information
- Type: Reservoir
- Architectural style: Châteauesque (pump-houses)
- Location: 815 Doctor Penfield Avenue, Montreal, Quebec, Canada
- Coordinates: 45.505529°N 73.578777°W
- Completed: 1932
- Owner: City of Montreal

Dimensions
- Other dimensions: Grounds: 37,477 m^{2}

Technical details
- Floor area: 2,541 m^{2}

The McTavish reservoir (French: Réservoir McTavish), named for Simon McTavish, is an underground reservoir and park located beside McGill University's campus on the southern slope of Mount Royal in Montreal, Quebec, Canada. It holds 37 million gallons of water and is supplied by its large Châteauesque style pump-houses situated in the south-eastern corner of the park. Atop the reservoir is Rutherford Park, and it is also the location of the McTavish automated weather reporting station (CWTA, 71612).

== History ==
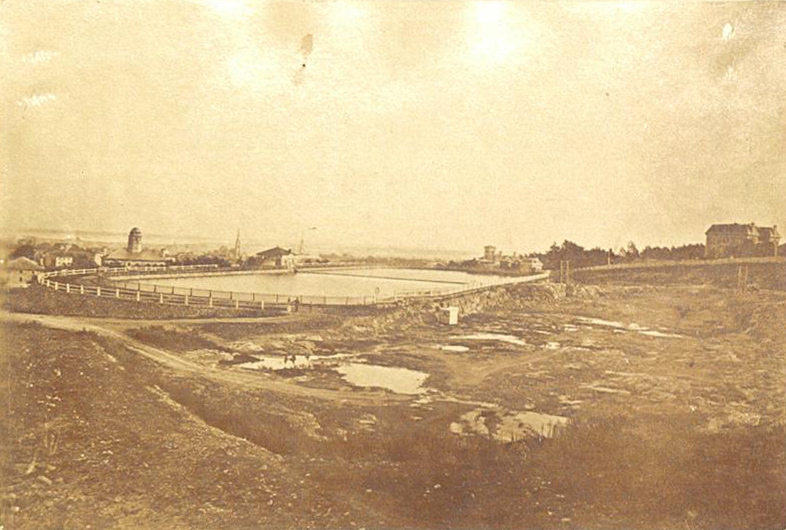
The McTavish reservoir as it appeared in 1873, uncovered. The cupola of the McGill College Building (now called the Arts Building) is visible at left.

The city of Montreal decided to construct the reservoir in 1852, after a devastating fire that destroyed almost half the houses in the city. The fire had broken out while the previous reservoir, located at what is now Saint-Louis Square, was closed for repairs.

The McTavish reservoir was constructed from 1852 to 1856 and uses the natural rock of the site to hold water, with some masonry on the south side. The reservoir was increased in size twice after its initial construction. The open reservoir was eventually covered in 1957, and the terrain on top is used for recreation (Rutherford Park). The cliff created in the construction of the reservoir is used as an ice climbing location.

Nine million dollars was spent in 2008 to 2009 on upgrading the pump-houses and reservoir for infrastructure security and preventing water contamination, but the security features have proven to be ineffective and easily infiltrated. The city of Montreal attempted to close the park in 2009 and restrict access to the public, citing escalating terrorist threats after the September 11 attacks as the rationale for the non-publicly consulted decision. However, the park remains accessible as of March 2021.

The McTavish Reservoir near the McGill University, Montreal, in July 2026

In 2011, a pipe in the reservoir burst, sending a torrent of water down to the adjacent McGill University campus. It was not the first time that the reservoir has caused damage to McGill – during its construction in 1852, blasting propelled large rocks through the roof of the McGill College Building (now the Arts Building), causing staff and students to seek refuge.

In January 2013, a severe flood on the downtown campus of McGill University (affecting several buildings and streets in the downtown area) was caused by water coming from the McTavish reservoir.

== See also ==
- Doctor Penfield Avenue
- McTavish Street
