= McTavish Street =

Street and pedestrian zone in McGill University's downtown campus in Montréal, Canada

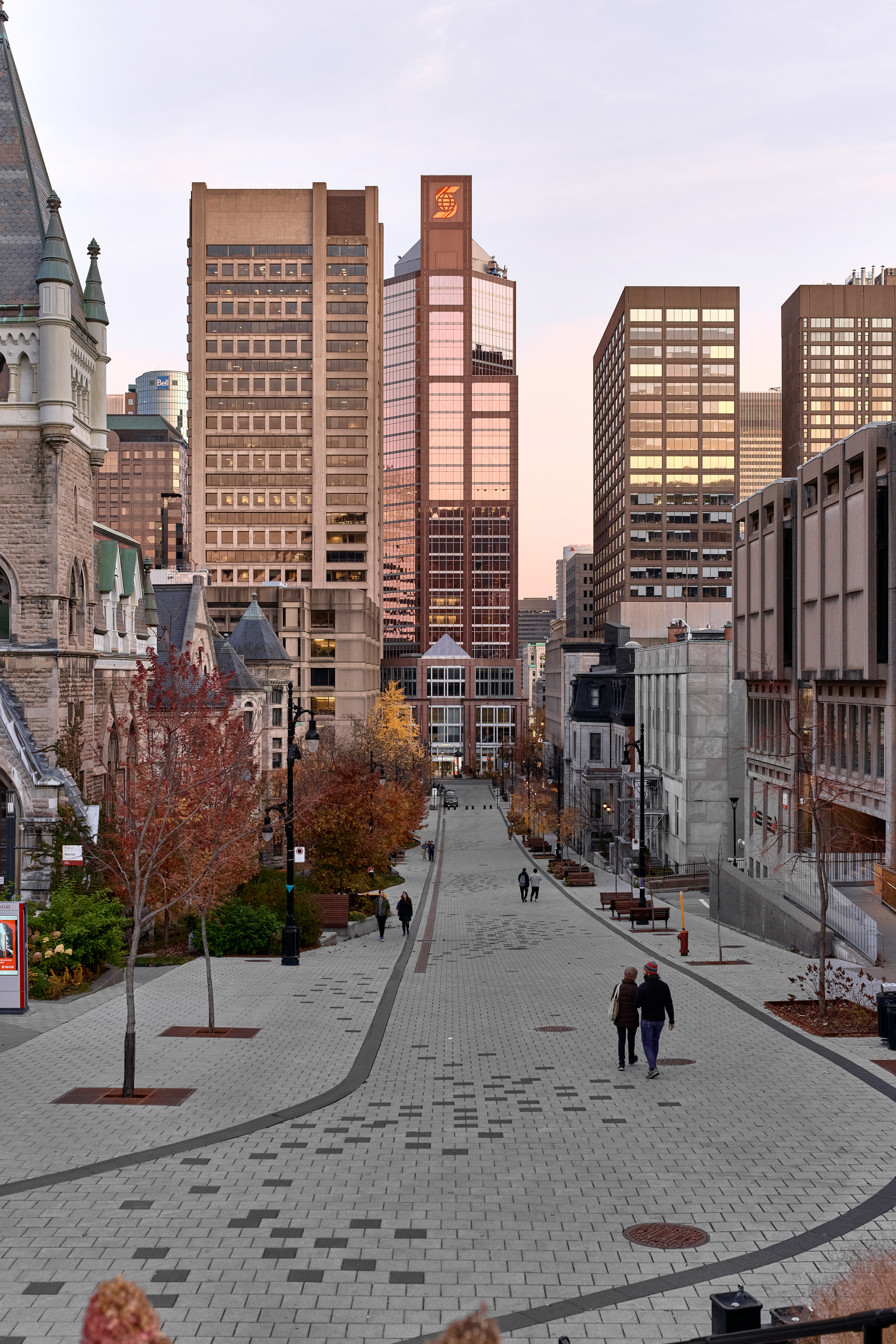
McTavish Street viewed from Doctor Penfield Avenue, October 2022

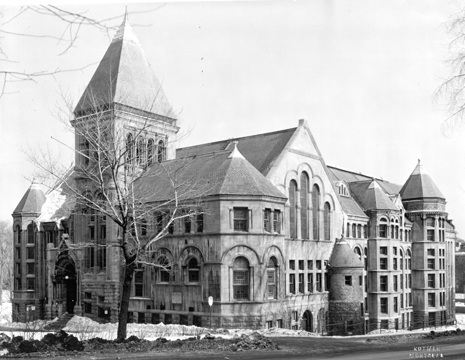
McGill's Redpath Library building as seen from McTavish Street in 1935.

McTavish Street (officially in French: Rue McTavish) is a street in the Golden Square Mile of Montreal, Quebec, Canada. It is named for Simon McTavish, whose estate once covered the land about it. The street runs up the slope of Mount Royal, from Sherbrooke Street at its southern end, to Pine Avenue, where its end is marked by Sir Hugh Allan's former home, Ravenscrag.

Adjoining to the main campus of McGill University, as of 28 May 2010 the lower half of the street is a car-free zone. Plans call for the greening of the street with additional shrubs and trees. The pedestrianization of McTavish is part of a citywide plan as well as the university's "Greening the Lower Campus" initiative.

Above Doctor Penfield Avenue, the street borders the western edge of the McTavish reservoir.

== See also ==
- Mackay Street
