= Clan MacTavish =

Clan MacTavish, an Ancient Highland Scottish clan

- MacTamhais, MacTavish, McTavish, Mactavish, McThavish, Thave, MacTavis, M‘Tavish, Thomas, Thomson, Thompson
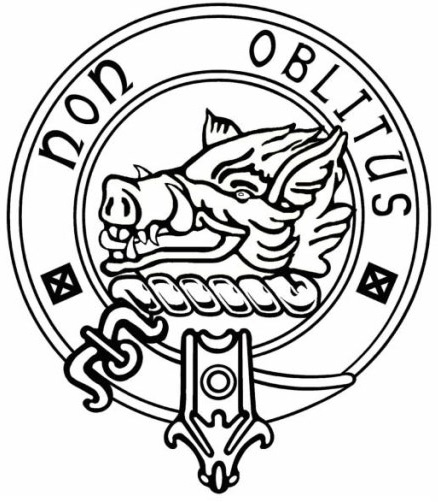
- Crest: boar’s head erased or langued gules within a plain circlet bearing the motto "NON OBLITUS"
- Motto: NON OBLITUS ("Not Forgotten").
- War cry: CRUACH MOR

Profile
- Region: Highland
- District: Argyll
- Plant badge: The Jacobite Rose (White Rose)
- Pipe music: "MacTavish Is Here"

Chief
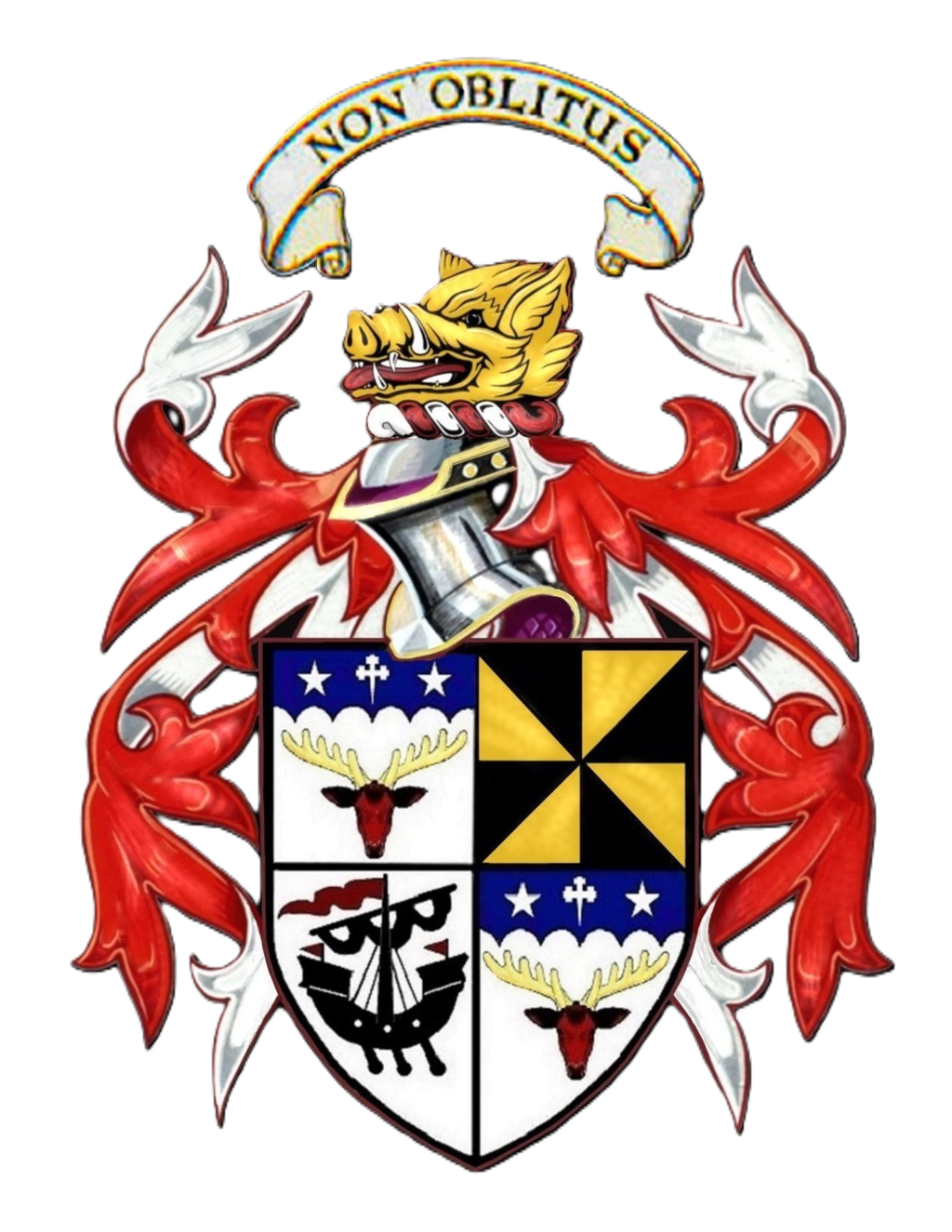
- Steven Edward Dugald MacTavish of Dunardry
- Chief of the Name and Arms and Chief of the Clan MacTavish, the 27th Hereditary Chief from an unbroken line (Mac Tamhais Mor)
- Historic seat: Castle of Dunardry
Septs of Clan MacTavish
Cash, Holmes, Kash, Kaish, MacAishe, MacCamish, MacCash, MacCavish, MacComb**, MacCombie**, MacComich, MacComish**, MaComie, Macomie**, MacCosh, MacIltavish, MacIlTavish, MacLaws, MacLawes, MacElhose, MacLehose, MacTais, MacTaus, MacTauais, MacTavish, McTavish, Mactavish, Mactavis, M’Tavish, MacTawes, MacTawis, MacTawys, MacTawes, MacTeague, Stephens, Stephenson, Stevens, Stevenson, Stinson, Tavish, Tawes, Tawse, Tawesson, Tawis, Teague, Thomas**, Thomason, Thomasson, Thompson, Thomson**, Tod, Todd, Tomey and all variant spellings.
Extended list of Clan MacTavish related family names gathered from historical records:
Cavis, Cevis, Cavish, Kavis, Kavish, Kaviss, Hawes, Haws, Hawson, Haweson, Hawesson, Hawsone, Holmes, MacAves, MacAvis, MacAvish, MacAwis, MacAwishe, MacAws, MacCaueis, MacCauish, MacCause, MacCavis, MacCavish, MacCavss, MacCaweis, MacCawis, MacCawes, MacCaws, MacCevis, MacClavish, MacGavish, MacGilchois, MacGilhosche, MacGillhois, MacHomais, MacHolmes, (less often McHomes), MacIlhaos, MacIlhois, MacIlhoise, MacIlhose, MacIlhouse, MacIllhois, MacIllhos, MacIllhose, MacKawes, MacKilhoise, MacKillhose, MacKlavish, MacKlehois, Makavhis, Makawis, Makcaus, Makcawis, Makcaws, Makcawys, Makgilhois, MacCevis, MacLawes, MacLaws, MacLehose, MacTaevis, MacTamhais, MacTause, MacTaveis, MacTavish, MacTawisch, MacTawys, MacTeague, MacTegue, MacThamais, MacThamhais, MacThavish, MacThomhais, McTavish, Makgilhoise, Micklehose, Mucklehose, Taes, Tais, Taise, Taish, Taiss, Tam**, Tameson, Tamesone, Tamson, Tamsone, Taus, Tauis, Tauise, Tauison, Tavis, Tavish, Taweson, Tawesson, Tawis, Tawes, Taws, Tawse, Tawseon, Tawseson, Tawson, Taweist, Tawst, Tawus, Thomason, Thomasson, Thomassone, Thomassoun, Thomessone, Thompson, Thomson**, Thomsone, Thomsoun, Thomsoune, Thomsson, Tomson, Tomsone.
NOTE: ** signifies that these names could be of Clan MacThomas.

Clan MacTavish (Scottish Gaelic: Na MacTàmhais) is an Ancient Highland Scottish clan and one of the original clans of Scotland, with Irish origins. The MacTavish lands were in Argyll in the Western Highlands, with their ancestral seat at Dunardry in Knapdale recorded since approximately 893 AD. Their current Chief is Steven Edward Dugald MacTavish of Dunardry, the 27th Hereditary Chief from an unbroken line, who is a member of the Standing Council of Scottish Chiefs.

== History ==
=== Origins ===
Notwithstanding several and varied origin traditions, the MacTavishes may have come from Ireland to Scotland during the years of the Scoto-Irish settlement era. This era is associated with the kingdom of Dál Riata, which spanned the western seaboard of Scotland and the north-east of Ireland. Very Old Irish forms (O.F. Gaeilge) of MacTavish are given by Father Patrick Woulfe in his widely accepted work on Irish Surnames. Woulfe gives several old forms (O.F.) of the name, showing nominative, genitive, and accusative forms, eight in all, along with their modified and modern equivalents.

Substantiating this is the 15th or 16th-century document writ known as the Ceart Uí Néill, taken from much older Irish documents, which refers to past times rather than the contemporary. There is a reference to the MacTavish holding lands in Ros Buill, the old kingdom of Ross Guill, now encompassing part of County Donegal. The translation of the Ceart is found in Studia Celtica. John O'Hart also gives two forms of the modern MacTavish, as well as an old form in Irish Pedigrees, The Origin and Stem of the Irish Nation.

==== Ancient Irish Pictish (Cruithni/Cruithne) origin ====
Another source for an Irish MacTavish origin is the Topographical Poems of O'Dubhagain, c. 1372, which illustrates what the origin of the MacTavishes appears to be. Under the subheading of "The Part of the Tir Chonaill", that is Conal Gulban's Land — often cited as what is now County Donegal, Ireland — is this entry on page 43: "To MacGillatsamhais the stout Belong Ros-Guill and Ros-Iroguil". The Ceart Uí Néill associates Ros-Guill and Ros-Irguill with a line of rulers known as the "Boar Kings." In the Fragmentary Annals of Ireland, entry 178 identifies Nuada Uirc (Old Irish: Orc, or "Boar") as one of these kings, listing him among those killed at the Battle of Allen in 722 as "Nuada Uirc, ri Guill & Irguill". Uirc or Orc, the kings of Ross Guill and Irgull are held synonymous with a boar, and the crest badge of the MacTavishes is a boar's head. The location noted for both the Boar Kings and the ancient Irish race of MacTavish being the same.

==== MacTavish family name and the Campbell claim ====
===== Competing Campbell derived origin theories =====
One tradition, recorded in the 17th-century Campbell genealogy Ane Accompt of the Genealogie of the Campbells, holds that Clan MacTavish descends from Tàmhas (Taus/Tavis Coir), son of Colin Mael Maith and a daughter of Suibhne Ruadh of Castle Sween (Sween the Red of Castle Sween). Nothing certain is known of Taus Coir other than that he is listed in several traditional genealogies. Patrick L. Thompson, Seannachie to the 27th Chief of Clan MacTavish and author of History of Clan MacTavish, identifies the clan's actual founder as Tamhais Mhór — Tavis the Great — born around 1145, and suggests Taus Coir may in fact be a later figure, possibly a son of Tamhais Mhór, rather than the founder himself. The 17th century genealogy Ane Accompt of the Genealogie of the Campbells traces Colin Mael Maith back to the mythological King Arthur. The Accompt identifies the legitimate son as "Gillespic" (Gilleasbaig) or "Archibald", ancestor of Clan Campbell; and two illegitimate sons as Tàmhas Ceàrr ("Taius Coir") and Iomhar ("Iver"), ancestors of the MacTavishes and Clan MacIver.

According to Alastair Campbell of Airds, a more probable candidate for the ancestor of the clan is the historical Sir Thomas Cambel. In 1292 Thomas' name is recorded on a list of landowners in the sheriffdom of Kintyre. In 1296 he signed the Ragman Roll as "Thomas Cambel among king's tenants in Perthshire". In 1308 he signed his name on a letter to the King of France. He was possibly dead by 1324, when his probable son, Duncan, was granted lands in Argyll for services rendered. In 1355, Duncan is listed under the name "Duncanus MacThamais", among "the Barons of Argyll".

The Craignish Manuscript, compiled by Alexander Campbell around 1706 from genealogies drawn up by the MacEwen seannachies of the Campbell chiefs between 1650 and 1660, gives Tavish Corr's parentage as different from Thomas Cambel. The Manuscript History cites Cailien Maol Maith as the father of Tavis, around 1100. Tweed mentions that Tavis' father, Cailien (Colin) Maol Maith, died at the siege of Dunstaffnage in 1110 — a claim Thompson treats with caution, noting that Argyll and the Isles were under Norse rather than Scottish royal authority at that time.

===== Independent evidence against Campbell descent =====
The 12th century Glenmasan manuscript, held in the National Library of Scotland (Adv.MS.72.2.3), bears the inscription of Eoin M'Tavis — John MacTavish — dated to 1238 AD, establishing the MacTavish name as an independent patronymic in Scotland more than thirty years before Thomas Cambel's first recorded appearance in 1270, and more than fifty years before any proposed Campbell ancestral connection can be dated to 1292.

Alastair Campbell of Airds says: "It seems probable that later compilers of the official genealogy, Ane Accompt, did not know of Sir Thomas 'Cambel' and were anxious to insert the MacTavishes into the account somehow." He has also referred to the clan as Tavish Campbells, insinuating the MacTavishes are Campbell descendants.

Historiographer William Skene, writing in 1837, noted: "The policy of the Argyll family led them to employ every means for the acquisition of property and the extension of the clan. One of the arts which they used for the latter purpose was to compel those clans which had become dependent upon them to adopt the name of Campbell, and this, when successful, was generally followed at an after period by the assertion that the clan was descended from the house of Argyll. In general, the clans thus adopted into the race of Campbell, are sufficiently marked out by their being promoted only to the honor of being an illegitimate branch, but the tradition of the country invariably distinguishes between the real Campbells and those who were compelled to adopt their name."

=== 561–637 AD: The Síl Ninnidh and the Battle of Mag Rath ===
The ancestors of the MacTavish chiefs are identified in early Irish historical sources with the Síl Ninnidh, a branch of the Cenél Conaill who held territory in Donegal during the early Christian period. Patrick L. Thompson, documents in the History of Clan MacTavish that the race of King Ninnidh — the Sil Ninnidh — are portrayed in the sources of the Battle of Mag Rath of 637 AD as "fierce routers of the enemy", noted among the battalions of the army of Cenél Conall. The Battle of Mag Rath, fought near present-day Moira in County Down, is recorded in the Annals of Ulster, the Annals of the Four Masters, and the Chronicon Scotorum, and was one of the largest battles in early Irish history.

The Rawlinson B502 manuscript preserves the genealogy of the Cenél nDuach — tracing the line from Conall Gulban through Ninnid to the Boar King Corcc (Cuircc), whose Pictish double-c designation marks him as a distinct dynastic leader. Thompson documents a kinship connection between the Cenél nDuach Boar Kings and the Abbots of Iona: Uricc Doi, King of Guill and Irguill, was killed in 658 AD "during the tenure of his cousin, Cuinime, 7th Abbot of Iona." Adomnán, the 9th Abbot of Iona and biographer of Saint Columba, is independently confirmed as one of the sources recording the Battle of Mag Rath.

=== 9th century: Establishment at Dunardry, 893 AD ===
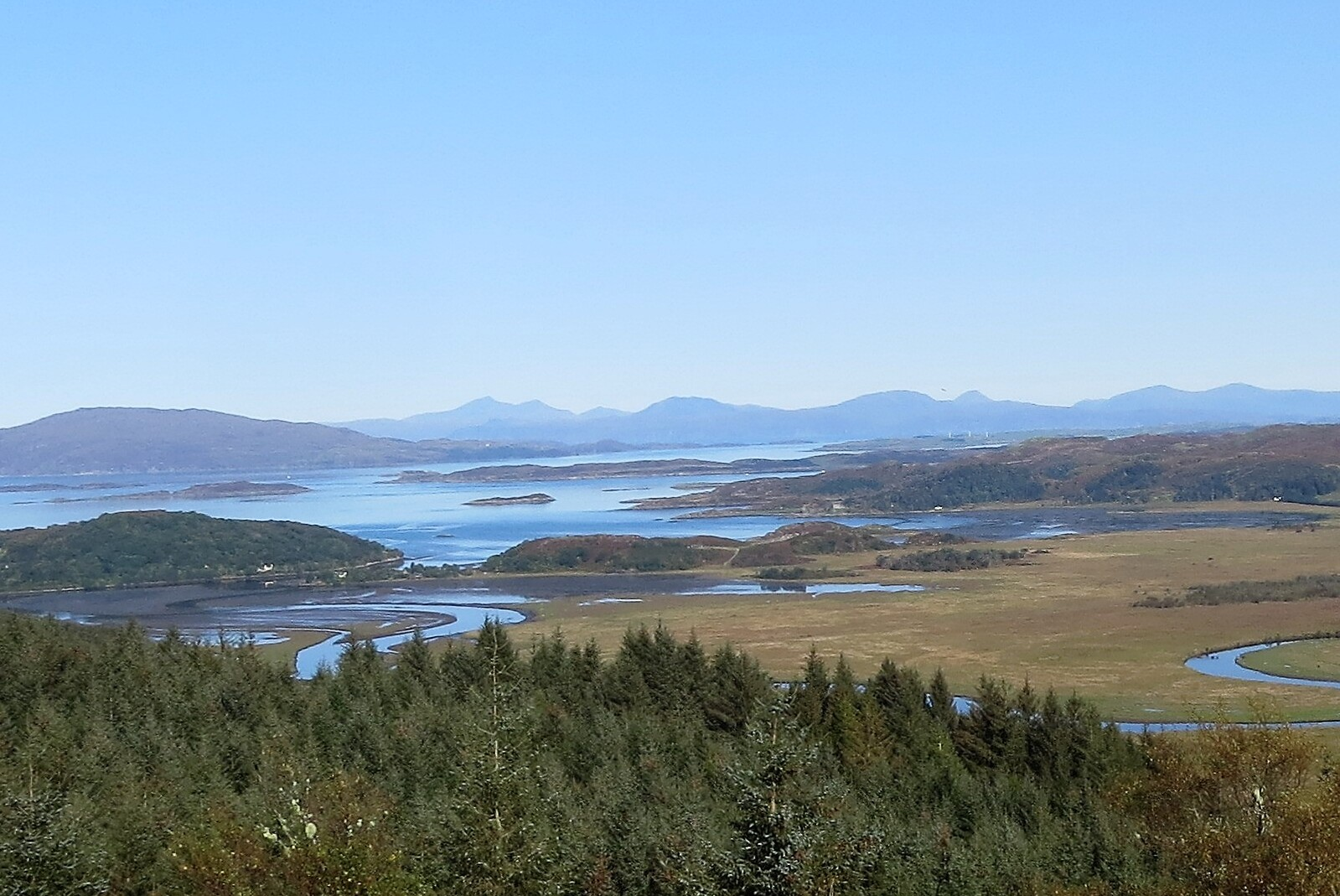
View from Cruach Mòr above the ancient MacTavish seat at Dunardry, Knapdale, Argyll, looking west across the Moine Mhòr toward the Atlantic Ocean

Two independent publications from 1793 provide the earliest dated reference to the MacTavish presence at Dunardry in Knapdale, Argyll. The European Magazine and London Review, published by the Philological Society of London — the oldest learned society in Great Britain, founded in 1782 — states that the mother of its author's father "was a daughter of MacTavifh or Thomfon of Dunardary. This is a very ancient and respectable family, who have inherited the estate of Dunardary for upwards of nine hundred years." The Scots Magazine of the same year contains an independent corroboration of the same nine hundred-year tenure. Nine hundred years before 1793 places the MacTavish establishment at Dunardry at approximately 893 AD — more than 300 years before the first documented Campbell presence in Argyll around 1220.

The Reverend John Dewar of Argyll specifically identified the MacTavishes among the Dalriadic landowners in Argyll who were not Campbells — alongside the MacArthurs, MacLachlans, and MacNeills. The Inveraray Castle website, approved by the 13th Duke of Argyll, states that "The Campbells arrived in Argyll as part of a royal expedition in c. 1220."

The castle of Dunardry — Dùn Àrd-Rìgh, meaning Fort of the High King — stood at the foot of the second highest hill in Knapdale, beside the freshwater Loch a'Bharain (Loch of the Baron). Its location is marked on the 1634 Timothy Pont map of Argyll as a castellated building. Having been included in the forfeiture of the Earl of Argyll in 1686, the lands were restored to the family: Archibald McCawis (MacTavish), 17th Chief, received a precept of clare constat from the Earl of Argyll as son and heir of Donald McCawis of Tonardarie (MacTavish of Dunardry) on 18 September 1700, with sasine registered in the Dunbarton Sasine Register in 1701.

The castle's remaining stonework was scavenged by canal workers to repair breaches in the Crinan Canal — first when a break occurred in the canal bank, and again after the reservoir bursts of 1859 — leaving only the massive footing stones. In 2021, during a £4 million renovation of the Crinan Canal, the canal was drained and the submerged remains of the castle became visible for the first time in centuries.

=== 11th–13th century: The Scottish Highland clan takes form ===
The origins of Clan MacTavish as a distinct Scottish clan are traced to the period around 1100 AD. The Craignish Manuscript, compiled by Alexander Campbell around 1706 from genealogies drawn up by the MacEwen seannachies of the Campbell chiefs between 1650 and 1660, identifies Cailien Maol Maith — Colin the Tonsured — as the father of Tavis Corr, placing the birth of the clan's Scottish eponymous ancestor around 1100 to 1111 AD. Tweed mentions that Tavis' father, Cailien (Colin) Maol Maith, died at the siege of Dunstaffnage in 1110 — a claim Patrick L. Thompson, Seannachie to the 27th Chief of Clan MacTavish, treats with caution, noting that Argyll and the Isles were under Norse rather than Scottish royal authority at that time. The tradition held throughout western Argyll was recorded by local historian Miss Nancy MacLeod of Springbank House, who told Sheriff-Substitute James Robertson at Tobermory that the MacTavishes descended from "Tavish mor MacMhieCalain" — Great Tavish, son of Colin.

The 17th century Campbell genealogy Ane Accompt of the Genealogie of the Campbells identifies two illegitimate sons — Tàmhas Ceàrr (Tavis Coir) and Iomhar (Iver) — as ancestors of the MacTavishes and Clan MacIver respectively. Alastair Campbell of Airds proposed that a more probable historical ancestor was Sir Thomas Cambel, recorded in 1292 as a landowner in the sheriffdom of Kintyre, who signed the Ragman Roll in 1296. Thompson notes however that the Glenmasan manuscript of 1238 AD establishes John MacTavish as a named individual more than thirty years before Thomas Cambel's first recorded appearance in 1270, and argues this timeline is incompatible with Cambel being the clan's ancestor.

The MacTavish chiefs did not consider themselves descendants of the Campbells, a position confirmed by Lord Lyon Sir Malcolm Innes of Edingight in 2000: "Clan MacTavish is not a sept of Clan Campbell. It is a distinct Clan."

The Scottish Annual and Book of the Braemar Gathering of 1957 recorded Clan MacTavish in capital letters — the typographic convention used in that publication to denote the original clans of Scotland.

=== 14th–15th century: The Barons of Argyll ===
The earliest unambiguous documentary record of a MacTavish chief in Scotland appears in the Argyll Transcripts — records produced from the archives at Inveraray Castle by Niall Diarmid Campbell, 10th Duke of Argyll. On 25 August 1355, Baron Duncan McThamais appeared as one of the Barons of Argyll at a great inquest held before Alexander, Sheriff of Argyll, at Inverleckan — now Furnace — on Loch Fyne. The record identifies him as undoubtedly the chief of Dunardary of the period.

In 1456, the Exchequer Rolls of Scotland record a Domine Thome Tawis — Sir Thomas Tawis — serving as Chamberlain to the Earl of Menteith in Knapdale, with accounts running from 1451 to 1454. On 17 July 1456, Ean Gorum MacTawys — the 5th Chief of Clan MacTavish — witnessed a charter to the Friar Preachers of Glasgow from Donald MacLachlane of Strathloachlan.

By this period the MacTavishes had spread from their principal seat at Dunardry throughout Knapdale and into northern Kintyre. The churchyard at Kilmartin, a few miles north of Dunardry, served as the MacTavish chiefs' burial ground. It contains flat medieval slabs, several carved with Celtic sculptures, alongside a full-length relief effigy of a mail-clad warrior grasping a large sword — dated to the Iona school of the 14th–15th century — on which the name McTAVISH has been incised across the aventail. The 10th Duke of Argyll noted of the MacTavishes: "Though the MacTavishes were never a large or powerful clan, they have nevertheless been deemed a brave and honorable race, and numbers of them still live in Argyll under their old patronymic. Though the clan as a whole never seem to have made the slightest sign of adopting the name Campbell, they followed always the breach or banner of the Lords of Lochow in war and all hostings."

=== 16th century: Flodden and the 1587 Act of Scottish Parliament ===
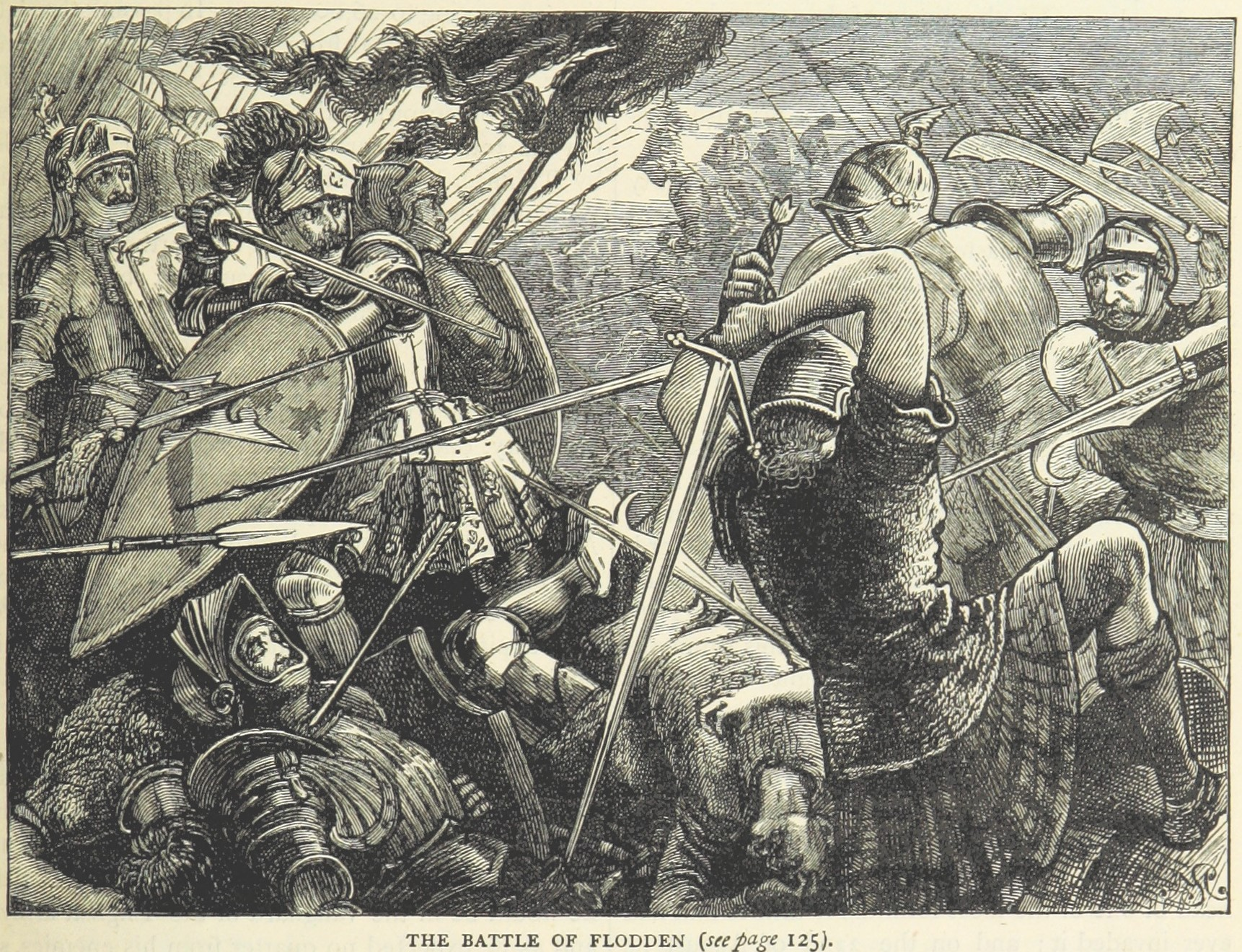
The Battle of Flodden in 1513 where Clan MacTavish lost three members of the chiefly line including the 6th Chief, his brother, and his heir.

The Battle of Flodden on 9 September 1513 — the largest battle ever fought between the Kingdom of England and the Kingdom of Scotland as part of the War of the League of Cambrai, resulting in an English victory — was among the bloodiest battles ever fought by Scotland. Estimates of Scottish deaths range from 5,000 to 14,000, and it is said that every noble Scottish family suffered losses that day.

Duncan MacTavish, the 6th Chief, died in the battle alongside the 2nd Earl of Argyll, John Campbell of Lawers, and Dougall Campbell of Inverawe. Duncan's brother Allan MacTaus also died at Flodden. Most significantly, Ean MacTavish — Duncan's son and heir, who would have become the 7th Chief — also died that day. The chief, his brother, and his heir were killed on the same afternoon. The chiefship passed to their cousin Dougall MacTavish, who died before 20 October 1547.

On 10 December 1533, the first surviving feudal charter for Dunardry was granted by the Earl of Argyll to John McAllister VcEwin VcCaus and his son Dougall, confirming the MacTavish tenure of the 3 merk lands of Tonardare (Dunardry), 2 merk lands of Dunans, 1 merk land of Bardarroch, 1 merk land of Barinloskan and ½ merk land of Barindaif — 7½ merk lands in Knapdale. Thompson interprets the charter as a re-grant confirming an existing possession rather than establishing a new one — a tenure long predating the documented Campbell presence in Argyll.

In 1564, Queen Mary confirmed several charters given by the Earl of Argyle. In the same year, Duncan McCaws of Dun-ArdRigh is recorded giving lands to John Carswell of Carnassary Castle. In 1592, a Great Seal of Scotland record mentions a Duncan McCaws and his brother Alexander.

The MacTavish name does not appear in the 1587 Act of the Scottish Parliament — or a subsequent Act of 1594 — which listed clans, families, and riding names requiring Crown suppression for lawlessness, as documented in the Records of the Parliaments of Scotland to 1707. At that time the MacTavishes held their estates under charter from the Earl of Argyll, who was directly responsible for keeping his vassals in lawful order. The Act's roll was compiled specifically to address disorderly conduct in the borders and highlands, not as a comprehensive register of Scottish clans. Numerous recognized ancient clans do not appear in the Act. As Patrick L. Thompson, Seannachie to the 27th Chief, noted: "If not mentioned in those Acts, does that mean that those clans or families did not exist? Of course not, and such an assumption is utterly ludicrous." Equally, Andrew Morrison, 3rd Viscount Dunrossil, a member of the Executive Committee of the Standing Council of Scottish Chiefs, notes that the presence of a name in the 1587 Act does not itself confer Highland clan status — observing that Border name groups such as Armstrong, Scott, Douglas and Graham, several of which appear in the Act, are "fine Scottish names, with an impressive history of accomplishments, but none is a Highland clan." The Act reflects lawlessness requiring Crown suppression, not clan identity — a distinction Dunrossil describes as "not just a matter of geography but of culture and social organization."

=== 17th century: Civil war, rebellion and execution ===
==== The Commonwealth Period ====
The 17th century brought the MacTavishes into the broader conflicts that swept Scotland during the Wars of the Three Kingdoms. John MacTavish of Dun-ArdRigh declined to follow the Earl of Argyll when Argyll changed sides during the Commonwealth period, and gave valuable assistance to the Reforming party. In 1656, John Mactavish of Tonardry was appointed by Cromwell a Justice of Peace and Commissioner of Supply for Argyllshire — an appointment indicating recognized social standing and administrative capacity within the county.

Dougal MacTavish, a younger son of John MacTavish the 12th Chief, was killed at the Battle of Stirling on 12 September 1648. Following the battle the Marquess of Argyll provided the MacTavish chief with replacement weapons — a sword and musket — lost in the fighting.

==== Argyll's Rising and the Execution at Carnasserie ====
By the time of Argyll's Rising in 1685, the MacTavish name was documented throughout Knapdale, Kilmichael Glassary, and Kilberry. In three parishes alone, twenty-five MacTavish rebels and forty fencible men of the name were listed — sixty-five MacTavish fighting men recorded in a single event. A subsequent 1692 List of Fencible Men compiled from the same Inveraray Sheriff Court records similarly documents dozens of MacTavish and McCavish entries concentrated in Knapdale and Kintyre, providing further official contemporary evidence of the clan's settled population in the region. Patrick L. Thompson, who produced an annotated edition of these records, notes that the surviving 1685 Rebels list is itself incomplete — the original court dispositions for that year having gone missing — meaning the documented numbers likely understate the clan's true population in the period.

Carnasserie Castle, near the village of Kilmartin, had been held for the Earl of Argyll during his rebellion against James VII — the 9th Earl's part in the Monmouth Rebellion. The castle was captured, partly blown up by a Royalist force commanded by MacLean of Torloisk, and left as a burnt-out shell. When the castle was surrendered under terms of peaceful capitulation the besieging forces violated those terms. Dugald MacTavish, 14th Chief and Fiar of Dunardry, aged 21, was hanged within bow-draught of the castle gateway immediately after the surrender. Campbell of Auchinbreck petitioned Parliament in 1690, seeking £118,000 Scots. £20,000 of that was for the burning of Carnasserie alone, the rest was for covering his uncle's murder and the ruin of his estate. Among the most tragic sufferers in Knapdale was Marie Campbell, widow of John MacTavish of Dunardry, whose son Dugald had been hanged at Carnasserie. Dugald MacTavish is buried at Kilmartin Churchyard.

The Inveraray Sheriff Court Records of 1685 record "Donald Mc tavish of Dunardarie heritor execut" among the rebels of Argyll's Rising — a direct legal designation of a MacTavish as heritor of Dunardry in an official court instrument of the period, independently corroborating the chiefly line's documented presence at Dunardry at the time of the rebellion.

This Donald MacTavish, 13th Chief, had his lands forfeited in 1685 for his part in following the Earl of Argyll in the rising; they were subsequently restored to a cousin. His son Dugald had already been hanged at Carnasserie that same year, and his second son, Alexander MacTavish, succeeded as 15th Chief and also died in 1685, "serving the Earl of Argyll." With Alexander's death, the chiefship passed to a cousin, Donald MacTavish, 16th Chief, who died around 18 September 1700 and was succeeded by his son Archibald MacTavish, 17th Chief, who received a precept of clare constat from the Earl of Argyll that same year, with sasine registered in 1701.

=== 18th century: Jacobite Risings, Culloden and the loss of Dunardry ===
==== The Jacobite Risings ====
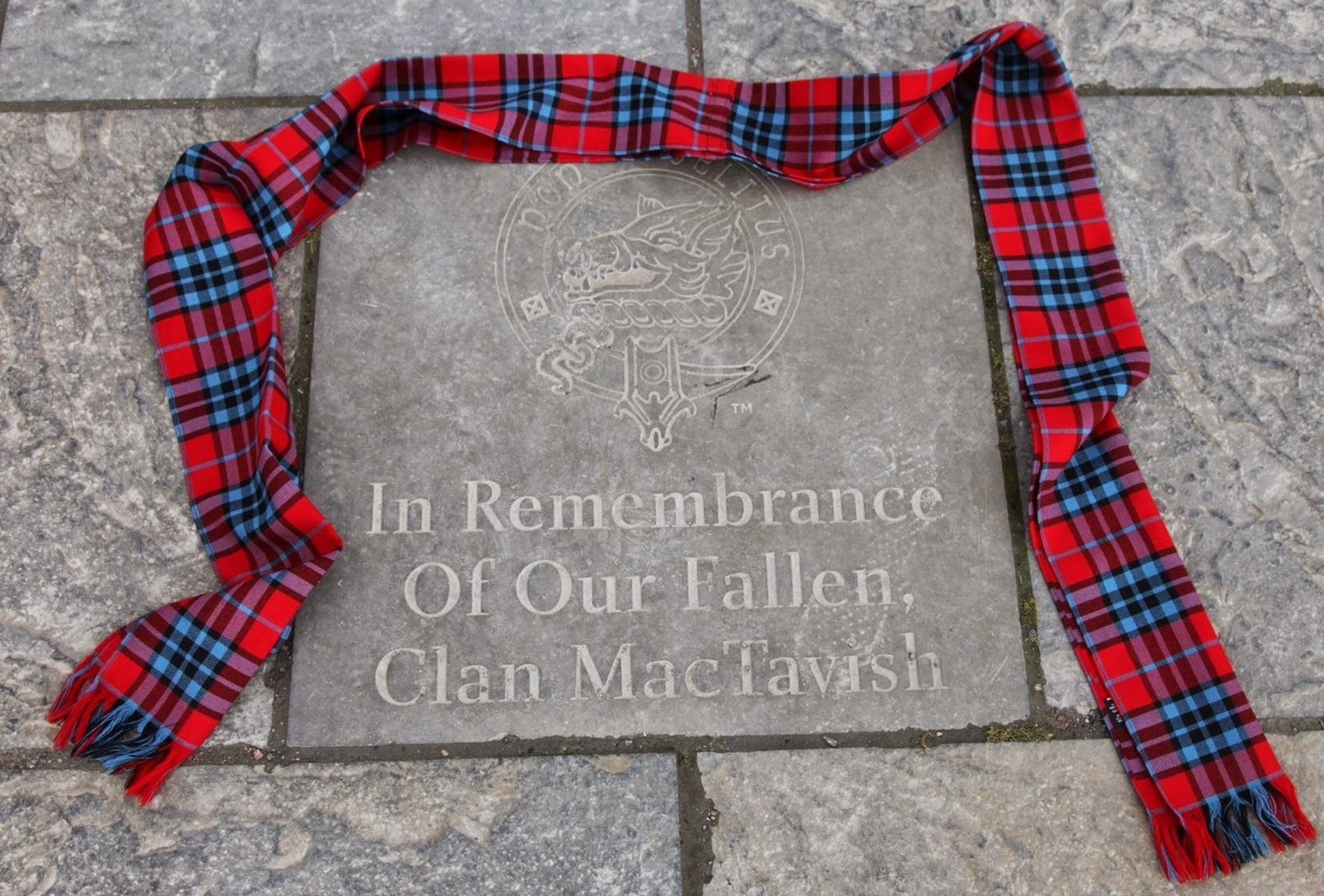
Clan MacTavish commemorative stone at Culloden battlefield bearing the boar's head crest, draped with the MacTavish Thompson Thomson 1880 tartan

During the Jacobite rising of 1715, Chief Archibald MacTavish was sympathetic to the Jacobite cause but took no overt action in support of either the Government or the Jacobites. He is recorded as having signed the address welcoming the Pretender, James Stewart.

In September 1745, both Chief Archibald MacTavish and his son Dugald MacTavish the Younger were imprisoned at Dumbarton Castle during the Jacobite rising of 1745, based on treasonable correspondence in which Dugald had written to Sir James Campbell of Auchinbreck indicating plans to raise MacTavish men in favour of Prince Charles Edward Stuart. With both the Chief and his heir imprisoned, there was no formal MacTavish leadership within the Jacobite Army. Some MacTavishes found their way into battle within the ranks of their neighbours, the MacIntoshes.

The Battle of Culloden on 16 April 1746 ended the Jacobite cause, with 5,000 fighting for Prince Charles and 9,000 for the government. The political, military, and judicial power of the Highland chiefs was subsequently abolished. Highlanders were forbidden on pain of death from wearing tartan plaid, bearing arms, or carrying a dirk. Cumberland himself declared after April 1746, "I tremble for fear that this vile spot may still be the ruin of this island and our family." The MacTavish lands were not confiscated, as both the Chief and his son had been confined in Dumbarton Castle during the rebellion. Both were released under the General Pardon of 1747. By September 1747 Chief Archibald had died, and Dugald MacTavish of Dunardry succeeded as the 18th Chief. He is recorded among the petitioners to the Masonic Lodge of Scotland to establish the Masonic Lodge of Inveraray in Argyll. According to E.F. Bradford's genealogical study of the family, Dugald MacTavish is recorded in 1757, ten years after Culloden, as one of the Duke of Argyll's chamberlains with authority to collect debts.

==== Highland Clearances and the name transition ====
Following Culloden and the suppression of Gaelic Highland culture, a number of MacTavishes adopted the anglicized spellings Thomson or Thompson. The Old Parish Registers of the Church of Scotland, which predate civil registration in Scotland beginning in 1855, document this transition. The registers contain documented instances of children from the same family baptised under different surnames. In the Killean and Kilkenzie parish of Kintyre (OPR 519/0020 0118), John Thomson married Barbara McColl in 1814; their first two children born in Kilcalmonell and Kilberry parish were recorded as Flory Thomson (1815) and Donald Thomson (1817), while their next three children born in South Knapdale were recorded as Duncan McTavish (1820), Matilda McTavish (1824), and John McTavish (1827) — the same parents, the same family, two different surnames used interchangeably across siblings. A second documented case, researched by genealogist Sarah Galbraith and presented to the Clwyd Family History Society in 2002, involves John McTavish of Craigruiadh: his eldest son John was baptized John McTavish in 1835 in the Killean and Kilkenzie register (OPR 519/0020 0118), while his younger siblings were baptized as Thomsons — confirmed by a family Bible recording identical birth and baptism dates. A memorial gravestone at Killean records the same individual and his family, lost at sea in the 1874 wreck of the Cospatrick, under the name Thomson.

In the mid-18th century, an estimated 25–30% of Scotland's population spoke Gaelic; by the 2011 census this had fallen to 1.1%. Andrew Morrison, 3rd Viscount Dunrossil, links this broader decline in Gaelic Highland culture following the Highland Clearances to the pattern of MacTavish families adopting the Thomson and Thompson spellings. Parish registers and family groups of gravestones in Argyll further express the transition of the name from MacTavish to Thomson. Some MacTavishes also became known as Tawessons or Thompsons, the latter with the intrusive "p" inserted — Thomas deriving from the Gaelic Tamhus. The chiefly line at Dunardry retained the name MacTavish throughout this period.

==== The 1793 Arms Matriculation ====
Dugald's son and heir Lachlan MacTavish of Dunardry succeeded his father in 1770. A 1752 Precept of Clare Constat by the Duke of Argyll names "Dugald McTavish" as son and heir of "Archibald McCawis alias McTavish" — the first document in the Dunardry series to use the modern MacTavish spelling, marking the point at which the anglicised form replaced the older Gaelic variants McCawis and McCavis in formal legal instruments. In 1793, John Hooke-Campbell, Lord Lyon King of Arms, granted the first formal matriculation of MacTavish arms to Lachlan MacTavish of Dunardry. These arms were recorded in the Public Register of All Arms and Bearings in Scotland, Volume 1, Folio 563, dated 17 April 1793.

The 1793 matriculation came about when Simon McTavish of Montreal — of the Garthbeg branch of the family from Stratherrick, Inverness-shire, and at that time one of the wealthiest men in Canada — wrote to Lachlan MacTavish inquiring about the MacTavish arms. Writing of Simon, Lachlan described him as "a kinsman of mine who has lately made his appearance in England with an immense Fortune, acquired in the wilds of North America, who has put upon me to take out Arms." Arms were simultaneously matriculated for Simon McTavish of Garthbeg as a cadet of the House of Dunardry. Some Stratherrick McTavishes were considered a sept of Clan Fraser. Lachlan's son John George McTavish, born at Dunardry, subsequently became a fur trader with the North West Company under Simon McTavish's patronage, joining the company in 1798. No deed of resignation or nomination transferring the chiefship from Dunardry to Garthbeg was ever recorded at the Court of the Lord Lyon.

==== Sale of Dunardry ====
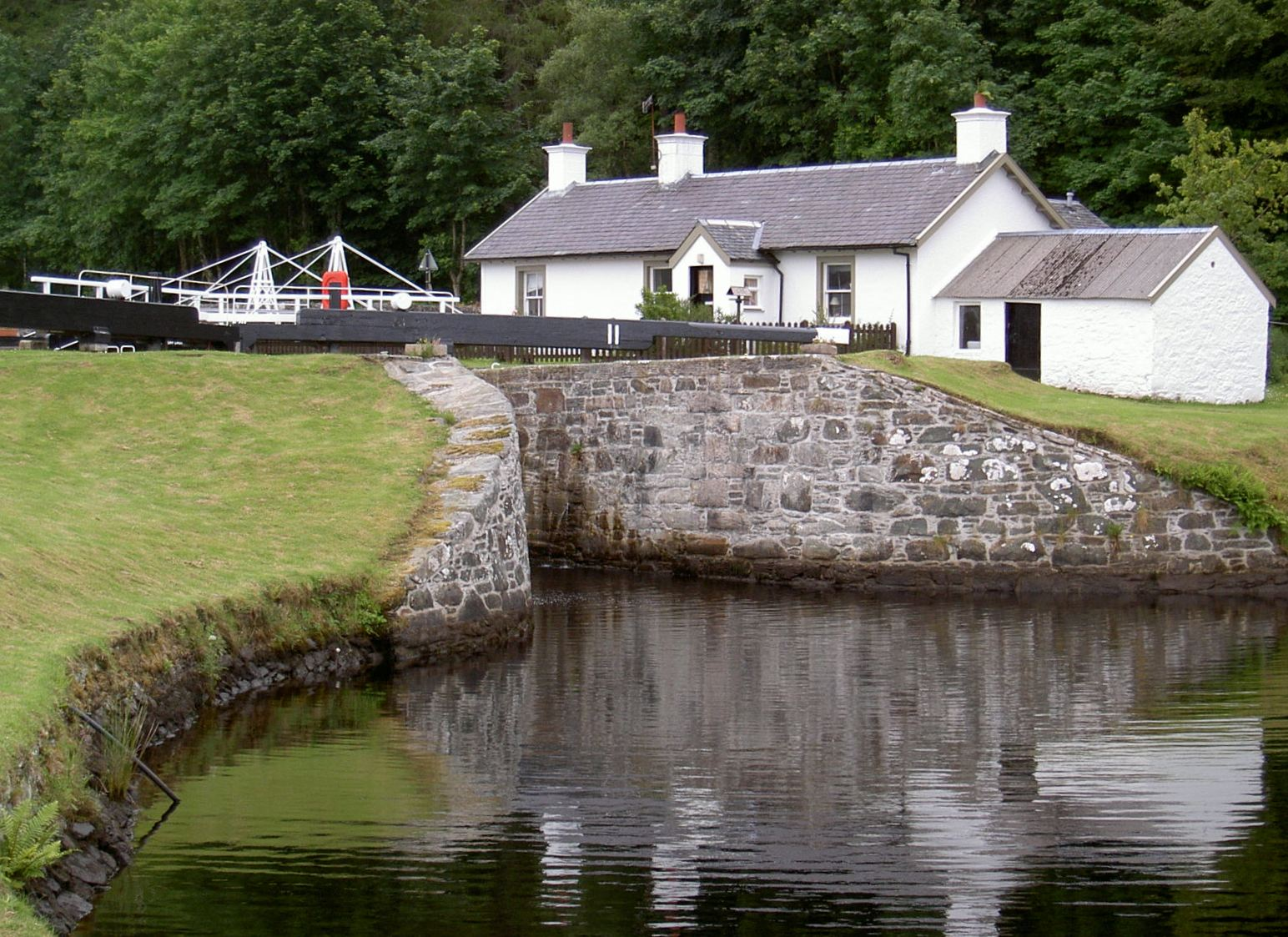
The Crinan Canal at Dunardry, Knapdale, Argyll — construction of which divided the ancient MacTavish chiefly estate in the 1790s.

Lachlan MacTavish fell into severe financial difficulty. At least two Court of Session decisions arose from debts connected with the estate of Duncan Campbell of Kilduskland, who had died in 1766. The combined debts owed to Kilduskland's niece Elizabeth MacDonald of Largie and nephew Ronald Campbell amounted to more than four times the annual income from the Dunardry lands, which stood at £392 as stated in the Edinburgh Evening Courant Novemenber 1785 advertisement. On 5 November 1785, the Estate of Dunardry was advertised for sale by public auction. Twenty-six consecutive legal instruments — feu charters, sasines, precepts of clare constat, and trust dispositions — document the unbroken MacTavish tenure at Dunardry from 1533 through the 1785 sale, naming each successive chief by name. It was purchased initially by Campbell of Barbeck, and subsequently in 1799 by Simon McTavish of Montreal, six years after work had begun on the Crinan Canal which subsequently divided the estate.

Following the sale, Lachlan MacTavish, his wife, and their three-year-old son Dugald moved to Edinburgh, where Lachlan was installed as Governor of Taxes for the Crown, living at St. James' Court just off the Royal Mile. The Dunardry Estate eventually passed back to Lachlan's son, Sheriff Dugald MacTavish of Dunardry, Writer to the Signet, who sold it to Malcolm of Poltallach in 1823.

The purchase of the Dunardry lands by Simon McTavish did not constitute a transfer of the chiefship, which passes through documented genealogical descent confirmed at the Court of the Lord Lyon and not through property transaction.

=== 19th century: The chiefly line in Canada ===
Sheriff Dugald MacTavish of Dunardry resided in Kilchrist Castle, near Campbeltown. He served as Sheriff Substitute at Campbeltown, Kintyre, and as Writer to the Signet. In a letter dated 18 February 1845, he wrote of the MacTavish chiefly line: "twenty-one generations from father to son without an instance of collateral or female succession." He died in 1855 and is buried at Kilmartin Churchyard, North Knapdale, Argyll.

==== The Dormancy of the Chiefship ====
Dugald MacTavish was three years old when Dunardry was sold and under age when the 1793 arms matriculation lapsed. As a grown man serving as Sheriff Substitute of Kintyre, he did not re-register the arms, considering himself already legally established as MacTavish of Dunardry. He died without having done so. His son William MacTavish, who moved to Canada, similarly did not matriculate the chiefly arms. The Court of the Lord Lyon nominally suggests that at least every other generation re-register the chiefly arms to maintain active recognition.

==== William MacTavish and the Canadian Chapter ====
William MacTavish became the 21st Chief and rose to prominence in Canada, serving as Governor of Assiniboia and subsequently as Governor of Rupert's Land for the Hudson's Bay Company. He was at Red River Settlement during the period of political turmoil that preceded the creation of Manitoba, and was taken prisoner by Louis Riel during the Red River Rebellion of 1869–1870, denied adequate medical attention while in captivity. Following his release, William MacTavish retired from the Hudson's Bay Company and returned to Britain, dying at Liverpool on 23 July 1870, two days after his arrival.

Without formal matriculation of the chiefly arms, the chiefly line was considered dormant by the Court of the Lord Lyon.

==== The Garthbeg Cadet Branch in North America ====
The Garthbeg cadet branch descended from McTavishes who had settled on the estates of Clan Fraser of Lovat in Stratherrick, Inverness from the 16th century — lands held by Simon Fraser, 11th Lord Lovat, who was executed for high treason following the Jacobite rising of 1745. John M'Tavis of Gartenbeg and his brother Alexander M'Tavish served as officers in the Jacobite army during the rising of 1745, as recorded in the official government rebel list compiled by Scottish Excise supervisors within a year of Culloden.

The most prominent member of this branch was Simon McTavish of Montreal, co-founder of the North West Company and at one time one of the wealthiest men in Canada. His arms were matriculated at the Court of the Lord Lyon in 1793 simultaneously with those of Lachlan MacTavish of Dunardry, as a junior cadet line of the House of Dunardry — the bordure on his arms indicating junior status.

John Lovet MacTavish (c.1787–1852), Simon's nephew, served as British Consul to the State of Maryland. Raised by his uncle after his father Alexander MacTavish died in 1788, John married Emily Caton of Maryland, whose maternal grandfather was Charles Carroll of Carrollton — the only Catholic signer of the United States Declaration of Independence. Emily's sisters married into British nobility including the family of the Duke of Wellington. John and Emily resided at Folly Quarter estate in Howard County, Maryland — named after the MacTavish family's Scottish lands — and are buried at Green Mount Cemetery in Baltimore.

=== 20th century: Discovery and restoration of the chiefship ===
==== The rediscovery ====
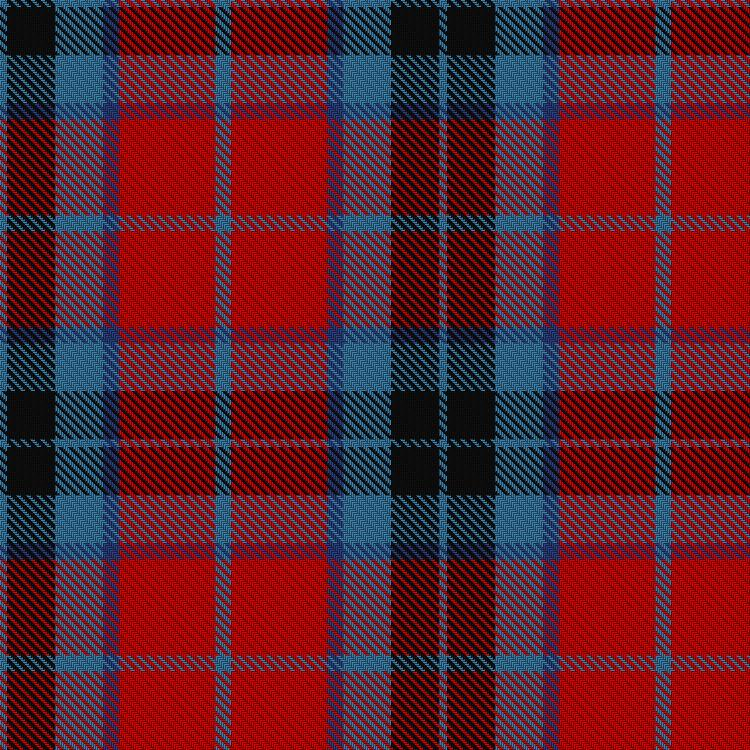
Clan MacTavish modern red tartan, as published in 1906 in W & A K Johnston's Tartans of the Clans & Septs of Scotland.

The rediscovery of the MacTavish chiefly line came about through genealogical research. Historian Margaret Arnett MacLeod was editing the letters of Letitia Hargrave — daughter of Sheriff Dugald MacTavish of Dunardry at Campbeltown and wife of Joseph James Hargrave of the Hudson's Bay Company — for publication by the Champlain Society. In the course of her research Mrs. MacLeod identified the MacTavish chiefly descent. Her husband, Dr. Allan MacLeod, had taken over the medical practice of James MacTavish — son of Governor William MacTavish — at Red River, which had first drawn Mrs. MacLeod into researching the MacTavish family connection. Mrs. MacLeod wrote to the Lord Lyon King of Arms, who in turn contacted the MacTavish family in Canada.

Lord Lyon Sir Thomas Innes of Learney wrote to John William Alexander Joseph MacTavish at Queen Mary Veterans' Hospital in Montreal on 26 December 1950, advising him of the heirship and urging him to petition for the Arms and Chiefship of the Clan. The contact was reported in the Lethbridge Herald on 20 November 1950: "Scotland is calling the MacTavishes. The Lord Lyon of Scotland has written a Winnipeg historian in an attempt to find the chief of Clan Tavish in time for a gathering of the chiefs of all Scottish clans in 1951." John William MacTavish was severely ill from injuries sustained during the First World War and did not matriculate. He died on 24 December 1954.

The search for the MacTavish chief attracted international attention. The Sun-Herald of Sydney, Australia reported in April 1955 that Lord Lyon Sir Thomas Innes of Learney had stated that the Canadian claimant Dougald Mactavish's "claim to the title on the knowledge already before us is fairly clear and could possibly succeed" but that no formal claim had been made.

==== The Five Year Petition ====
In 1992, Edward Stewart Dugald MacTavish of Dunardry petitioned the Court of the Lord Lyon for the Arms and Chiefship of Clan MacTavish. The petition required five years of rigorous documentary verification, during which the petitioner established the unbroken genealogical descent from Lachlan MacTavish of Dunardry through each successive generation to the present day. During this process a claim was raised — based on a 1991 self-published work by E.F. Bradford — that the chiefship had been transferred from the Dunardry line to the Garthbeg line through Simon McTavish of Montreal. An examination of more than 600 documents held in the Argyll and Bute Archive at Lochgilphead found no deed of resignation, nomination, or rematriculation supporting such a transfer. The land transaction documents Bradford had examined were Sheriff Court instruments governing property transfer — entirely separate in Scottish law from the Lord Lyon Court's jurisdiction over chiefship succession, a distinction affirmed in Macnab of Macnab 1957 SLT (Lyon Court) 2.

Lord Lyon Sir Malcolm Innes of Edingight determined in favour of Edward Stewart Dugald MacTavish of Dunardry's petition on 23 July 1997, with the matriculation formally sealed on 13 December 1997, recognising him as the 26th Chief of Clan MacTavish and ending a dormancy of approximately 200 years. The matriculation was recorded in the Public Register of All Arms and Bearings in Scotland, Volume 82, Folio 36.

=== 21st century: Restoration, recognition and legacy ===
==== The 27th chief ====
Edward Stewart Dugald MacTavish of Dunardry died on 19 June 2005 at his home in Vancouver, British Columbia. He was succeeded by his son and heir Steven Edward Dugald MacTavish of Dunardry, who became the 27th Chief of Clan MacTavish and was admitted to the Standing Council of Scottish Chiefs. On 31 August 2013 the Court of the Lord Lyon matriculated new arms for Chief Steven — adding a West Highland Lymphad in the third quarter, continuing the reduction of Campbell heraldic elements begun with the 2003 amendment. Full details are documented in the Chiefly Arms section.

==== The MacTavish of Dunardry Dress Tartan ====
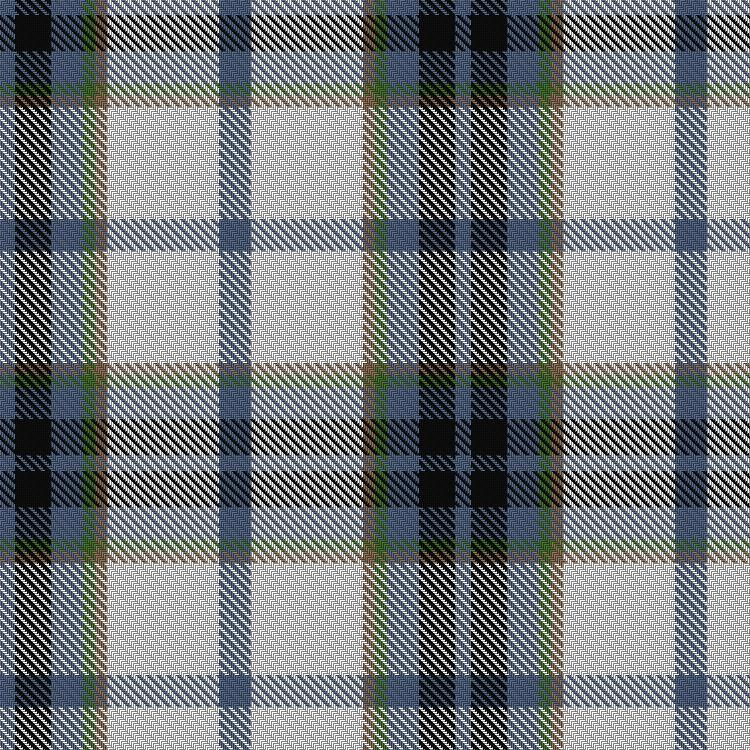
MacTavish of Dunardry Dress Tartan. Scottish Register of Tartans ref. 10731, registered 2012.

The origins of the MacTavish of Dunardry Dress tartan (SRT Ref# 10731) trace to a letter written by Sheriff Dugald MacTavish of Dunardry on 18 February 1845, preserved in the National Library and Archives of Canada, Ottawa. Writing to arrange a proper Highland dress for his son William — who would become the 21st Chief and Governor of Rupert's Land for the Hudson's Bay Company — Sheriff Dugald described what he understood to be the authentic Dunardry Tartan: "I am told the clothiers sell a Tartan they call MacTavish but from what I hear it little resembles the set [sic sett] which my grandmother (who was the eldest daughter of the chief of MacLachlan) considered the Dunardry Tartan & which she said should have as much white as there was yellow in the MacLachlan tartan."

Sheriff Dugald's grandmother — eldest daughter of the Chief of MacLachlan — carried a living memory of what the Dunardry Tartan looked like. Her description of the white substitution was consistent with the Highland tradition of dress tartans which substituted white for one of the primary colors of the hunting sett. Further corroboration came from the MacTavish Archives, which preserved an old swatch of MacTavish tartan endorsed by Isobel MacLachlan, widow of Chief Dugald MacTavish of Dunardry the 18th Chief, in 1797 — sealed with the MacTavish arms signet of 1793 in black wax. This artifact subsequently returned to the MacTavish chiefly family.

Drawing on the 1845 letter description and the archived swatch, Chief Dugald MacTavish of Dunardry the 26th Chief and Patrick L. Thompson, worked to identify and establish the MacTavish of Dunardry Dress tartan. In 2012, Steven Edward Dugald MacTavish of Dunardry, the 27th Chief, registered the MacTavish of Dunardry Dress Tartan with the Scottish Register of Tartans, reference number 10731. The tartan date is recorded as 18 February 1845 — the date of Sheriff Dugald MacTavish's letter describing the authentic Dunardry tartan sett as recalled by his grandmother, eldest daughter of the Chief of MacLachlan.

==== Publication of History of Clan MacTavish (2012) ====
In 2012 Patrick L. Thompson, 2nd Seannachie to the Chief of Clan MacTavish, published the authoritative History of Clan MacTavish through Otter Bay Books of Baltimore, Maryland, archived at the Library of Congress under control number LCCN 2012942086. It represents the most comprehensive documented history of the clan assembled in a single published work, drawing on primary sources spanning from the Irish annals through the Court of the Lord Lyon records.

==== Castle of Dunardry Rediscovered ====
In 2021, during a £4 million renovation of the Crinan Canal, the canal was drained and the submerged remains of Dunardry Castle — located between Lochgilphead and Crinan — became visible for the first time in centuries. As part of the renovation project aimed at enhancing safety along the historic waterway, the canal was drained during the winter months, uncovering what is believed to be the ancient stronghold of Clan MacTavish. The small castle or keep stood prominently by the freshwater Loch A'Bharain (Loch of the Baron). It was last inhabited by Lochlann MacTavish approximately 320 years ago. The rediscovery was reported by The Press and Journal and documented by Patrick L. Thompson in the Non Oblitus Newsletter.

The castle had been the hereditary seat of the MacTavish chiefs from approximately 893 AD until the sale of Dunardry in 1785 and the subsequent destruction of the ruins during Crinan Canal construction.

== Clan profile ==
=== Chief ===
The current chief of Clan MacTavish is Steven Edward Dugald MacTavish of Dunardry, Chief of the Name and Arms of MacTavish. He is the 27th Hereditary Chief of Clan MacTavish from an unbroken line. He assumed leadership of the clan upon the death of his father, Edward Stewart Dugald MacTavish, the 26th Chief, on 19 June 2005. He is a member of the Standing Council of Scottish Chiefs.

==== Chiefly Line ====
The following lists the Chiefs of Clan MacTavish as documented by Patrick L. Thompson, Seannachie, in the History of Clan MacTavish (Library of Congress LCCN 2012942086). In 1845 Sheriff Dugald MacTavish of Dunardry wrote of "twenty-one generations from father to son without an instance of collateral or female succession."

- Before listing the documented chiefs, a note on the earliest generations is warranted. The founder of Clan MacTavish was Tamhais Mhór — Tavis the Great — born around 1145 AD, who took lands in Cowal and is considered the eponymous first chief of the clan in Knapdale, Argyll. There are Campbell-derived genealogies — among them the Craignish Manuscript and the writings of Buchanan of Auchmar — that instead name a "Taus Coir" as the clan's progenitor, an account tied to a disputed and unverifiable tradition involving Dunstaffnage Castle and King Alexander I. Patrick L. Thompson's research treats this Campbell tradition with considerable caution and suggests Tavis Coir may in fact be a later figure — possibly a son of Tamhais Mhór — rather than the founder himself, though this cannot be established with certainty. The table below reflects this distinction.

#	Chief	Period / Notes
1	Tamhais Mhór (Tavis Mor) — Great Tavish	1st Chief. Born c. 1145 to Calumn Maol Maith and a daughter of Suibhne Ruadh of Castle Sween. Conquered parts of Cowal. A gravestone at Kilmartin Churchyard is pointed to by local historians as his resting place, said to be of 12th-century origin.
2	Tavis Coir	Named in Campbell-derived genealogies as conqueror of Cowal and ancestor of "the Clan Tavish." Possibly a son of Tamhais Mhór rather than a separate founder figure (see note above).
3–4	Names Undocumentned	13th–14th century. Names not documented in surviving records. Baron Duncan McThamais, undoubtedly the chief of Dunardary of the period, appeared as one of the Barons of Argyll at a great inquest held before the Sheriff of Argyll at Inverleckan on 25 August 1355.
5	Ean 'Gorum' (Blue) MacTawys	Noted as 5th Chief 1456.
6	Duncan MacTavish	Noted as 6th Chief 1490 and 1498.
7	Ean VcCaus (MacTavish)	7th Chief. Killed at the Battle of Flodden 9 September 1513.
8	Dougall McCaus (MacTavish)	8th Chief. Received first feudal charter to Dunardry from Earl of Argyll 1533. Died c. 1547.
9	Patrick MacAvis (MacTavish)	9th Chief. Noted 1569.
10	Ean MacCaus (MacTavish)	10th Chief. Noted 1580.
11	Archibald MacTavish	11th Chief. Resigned Dunardry lands to his son on same day he was recognized heir.
12	Ian (John) McCawis (MacTavish)	12th Chief. Served heir to lands of Dunardry 1643. Appointed Justice of Peace for Argyllshire. Died before 15 May 1669.
13	Donald McCawis (MacTavish)	13th Chief. 1685.
14	Dugald MacTavish of Dunardry	14th Chief. Commander of Carnasserie Castle aged 21. Hanged after surrendering the castle during Argyll's Rising 1685.
15	Alexander MacTavish	15th Chief. Died in battle during the Monmouth Rebellion 1685.
16	Donald MacTavish	16th Chief. Succeeded upon death of his cousin Alexander 1685.
17	Archibald MacTavish	17th Chief. Infeifed in Dunardry lands 1700. Appointed Commissioner of Supply for Argyllshire.
18	Dugald MacTavish	18th Chief. Succeeded in a Sasine 1752. Imprisoned at Dumbarton Castle 1745 during the Jacobite rising of 1745. Released under General Pardon 1747.
19	Lachlan MacTavish of Dunardry	19th Chief. Noted in Sasine 1770. Formally matriculated arms at Lyon Court 1793 — first formal MacTavish arms matriculation. Sheriff for Knapdale and Kintyre, Writer to the Signet. Sold Dunardry 1785–1786, buried Greyfriars Kirkyard.
20	Sheriff Dugald MacTavish of Dunardry	20th Chief. Sheriff Substitute at Campbeltown, Kintyre, Writer to the Signet. Repurchased and sold Dunardry to Malcolm of Poltallach 1823. Died 1855, buried Kilmartin Churchyard.
21	William MacTavish	21st Chief. Hudson's Bay Company Governor of Assiniboia and Rupert's Land. Brought MacTavish papers dating from 1312 to Canada. Did not matriculate. Died Liverpool 1870.
22	Dr. James William MacTavish	22nd Chief. Succeeded 1870. Did not matriculate.
23	Andrew Dugald MacTavish MM	23rd Chief. Holder of the Military Medal for Bravery. Succeeded 1900. Did not matriculate.
24	John William Alexander Joseph MacTavish	24th Chief. Identified by Lord Lyon Sir Thomas Innes of Learney c. 1950. Crippled in First World War. Living at Queen Mary Veterans' Hospital, Montreal. Did not matriculate.
25	Andrew Dugald (Dougald) MacTavish	25th Chief. Royal North West Mounted Police officer. Strongly considered matriculation 1951. Did not matriculate.
26	Edward Stewart Dugald MacTavish of Dunardry	26th Chief. Confirmed by Lord Lyon Sir Malcolm Innes of Edingight 23 July 1997 — first matriculated chief since Lachlan MacTavish in 1793. Died 19 June 2005, Vancouver, British Columbia.
27	Steven Edward Dugald MacTavish of Dunardry	27th Chief. Current chief. Succeeded 2005. Admitted to the Standing Council of Scottish Chiefs. Arms matriculated by Lord Lyon 2013.

=== Origin of the MacTavish name ===
The clan name MacTavish is an Anglicised form of the Gaelic MacTàmhais, which translates to Thomson or Thom(p)son in English. This name is a patronymic form of the Gaelic personal name Tamhus (pronounced Tavus or Tavis), which is translated to Thomas in English.

Thomson is an English language variant of the name of two existing Scottish clans, MacTavish and MacThomas. The MacTavishes come from Argyll in the Western Highlands, and MacThomases come from the counties of Angus, Aberdeenshire and Perthshire in the Eastern Highlands.

This also relates to the Irish and French family Thave, which have common Irish ancestors.

"The Pict word for twin was TAUUS (pronounced tavis). It became Tamhais in Gaelic and Tavish in English."

The Gaelic name Mac Tamhais is pronounced similarly to 'MacTavis' or 'MacTavish' (the "mh" in Gaelic pronounced as the "v" in the English word "very"). In old charters, the name had many variant spellings. Some spellings found within old Scottish charters, post-Culloden parish registers, and in "The Commons Argyll" appear as MacAvis, MacCamis, McCawis, McKavis, McKnavis, M'Ash, MacAnish, mcTais, MacTavifh and mcThavish, to give a few. It seems that from near the end of the 17th century, the spellings, MacTavish and/or Thom(p)son or Thomas were the most common. Variations in surname spelling within one document are often seen for the same person.

==== Thomson and Thompson — English Language Variants of MacTavish ====
Thomson and Thompson are not septs of Clan MacTavish in the traditional sense — they are the same name expressed differently. Mac Tamhais, MacTavish, Thomson, and Thompson all mean Son of Tamhais or Son of Thomas — the same ancestral identity expressed across Gaelic, anglicized Gaelic, and English. Similarly Cash and Holmes, both derived from Mac Tamhais through phonetic contraction, carry the same MacTavish ancestry in yet another form. These are not associated family names or septs — they are direct linguistic translations of the MacTavish name itself, and should be understood as such.

Other names, such as Todd, Stevenson, and their variants, are genuinely associated family names — the preferred designation of the Court of the Lord Lyon for what were historically called septs — and while closely connected to the clan, they carry a different and distinct relationship to the MacTavish name than Thomson, Thompson, Cash and Holmes do. Thomas-derived surnames have multiple distinct origins across Scotland — the 1587 Act of the Scottish Parliament, for example, lists Thomson among the Border riding surnames of the West March alongside Armstrong, Graham, and Johnstone, reflecting an entirely separate Lowland tradition with no Highland connection. Not all who bear the Thomson or Thompson surname are of MacTavish or MacThomas descent — independent Lowland and Border traditions also produced these names, and each tradition is distinct and legitimate in its own right.

Lord Lyon David Sellar confirmed in official correspondence dated 30 July 2008 that the surname Thomson came to be used as a further anglicisation of MacTamhais/MacTavish, initially in Argyll, and that some MacTavishes changed their name to Thomson with some now called Thomson descending from the family of MacTavish. In a further letter dated 20 May 2013, Lord Lyon Sellar confirmed that the MacTavishes and MacThomases are Highland clans and that the Thomsons cannot be described as a Highland clan.

A 1633 Procuratory of Resignation at Kilmichael in Knapdale lists John Thomson as a witness alongside Archibald McCawis of Tonardarie — an early documented instance of the Thomson and MacTavish names appearing side by side in the same legal instrument, reflecting the established practice of using both names interchangeably within the same community. Further genealogical evidence of this name transition is documented in Old Parish Registers of the Church of Scotland — see the Highland Clearances and the name transition section.

Clan MacThomas acknowledges this geographic distinction on their official septs page, stating: "Many Thomsons come from Argyll in the west of Scotland and are likely to be originally MacTavishes... Only those people whose ancestors come from the counties in Eastern Scotland mentioned above are likely to be MacThomases."

Frank Adam's Clans, Septs and Regiments of the Scottish Highlands, revised by Lord Lyon Sir Thomas Innes of Learney in its 8th edition of 1984, lists MacTavish as a clan and Thompson and Thomson as MacTavish associated names.

=== Seannachie ===
The ancient Office of Seannachie — keeper of Clan MacTavish history, memory, and story — was restored in late 1998 by the late Chief Dugald MacTavish of Dunardry. The first modern Seannachie, Micheil MacThomhais of Nevada, served from 1999 to 2003 and recovered and preserved a remarkable body of clan history and genealogy.

Patrick Lee Thompson of Boerne, Texas, served as the 2nd Seannachie to the Chief of Clan MacTavish from 2005 until his death on 4 December 2025. Thompson authored the authoritative History of Clan MacTavish, published by Otter Bay Books of Baltimore, Maryland, in 2012 and archived at the Library of Congress under control number LCCN 2012942086, as well as numerous research documents on MacTavish surname origins and heraldry.

John Harrison-Stevenson of St. George, Utah, was commissioned as the 3rd and current Seannachie of Clan MacTavish on 1 February 2026 and serves as Project Administrator for the Clan MacTavish Surname Project at FamilyTreeDNA. Alanna MacTavish and Nathan A. Thomson were commissioned Assistant Seannachies on 25 February 2026.

=== Clan symbols ===
==== Tartans ====
The tartans affiliated with Clan MacTavish are divided into two groups. The first group represents MacTavish tartans, which includes surnames that are variants of MacTavish, such as Thompson, Thomson, and Holmes. The second group represents tartans of associated family names, formerly known as septs, including Todd, Stephenson, Stevenson, and their variants Stephens, Stevens, and Stinson.

All tartan names and reference numbers are consistent with those registered with the Scottish Register of Tartans. Some vendors offer "ancient" versions of these tartans, such as MacTavish or Thom(p)son Ancient Hunting and MacTavish Ancient Red; these are not historically ancient tartans but are modern colourway recreations, a naming convention dating to the early-to-mid 20th century that uses lighter tones intended to simulate the appearance of aged natural dyes.

===== MacTavish Surname Tartans =====
Tartan	Name	SRT Ref	STA Ref	STWR Ref
	MacTavish/Thompson/Thomson 1880 Tartan	4115	229	229
	MacTavish/Thompson/Thomson 1906 Tartan	4114	230	228
	MacTavish/Thompson/Thomson Dress Blue Tartan	2769	1383	1383
	MacTavish/Thompson/Thomson Hunting Tartan	2770	282	2093
	MacTavish of Dunardry Dress Tartan	10731		
	MacTavish/Thompson/Thomson Camel Tartan	4121	2421	2421
	Thompson/Thomson/MacTavish Special Grey Tartan	4119	325	2758
	Thompson Grey Dress Tartan	4111	1611	1611
	Holmes Tartan	1752	5729	

===== Associated Family Name Tartans (Septs) =====
Tartan	Name	SRT Ref	STA Ref	STWR Ref
	Stephens Tartan	3915	7029	
	Stephens Dress Tartan	3916	7030	
	Stephenson Tartan	3917	517	517
	Stephenson Hunting #2 Tartan	3919	770	770
	Stevens (Personal) Tartan	3920	6664	
	Stevenson (Personal) Tartan	3927	1558	1558
	Stinson Tartan	3962	438	438
	Todd Tartan	4132	5107	

==== Crest badge ====
The crest badge suitable for members of Clan MacTavish contains the crest and motto of the clan chief. The crest is blazoned a boar's head erased or langued proper. The boar's head crest of the MacTavish chiefs derives directly from the ancestral Boar Kings of Guill and Irguill in Ireland — specifically Nuada Uirc Doith, whose name means Boar in Old Irish — predating any heraldic use of the boar by the Campbells. Tradition holds that the MacTavish gyronny was originally tinctured argent and azure (silver and blue), distinct from the gold-and-black gyronny of Clan Campbell; this traditional tincture is recorded on the gravestone of Hugh MacTavish of Dunorsan at Kilmichael Inverlussay cemetery, Knapdale. The motto is NON OBLITUS, which seems to translate from Latin as "not forgetful". But this is only one translation. Latin authorities often cite non-oblitus associated with funerary text, in which the deceased is commemorated. Thus, Non oblitus post mortem me, expounds the sentiment, "Do not forget me after death".

Non Oblitus standing alone expounds "Not Forgotten". Patrick L. Thompson, Seannachie to the 27th Chief, notes that Latin authorities often cite non-oblitus in funerary contexts where the deceased is commemorated — suggesting the MacTavish motto carries the sentiment "Not Forgotten" in a commemorative rather than admonitory sense, distinct from the Campbell motto Ne Obliviscaris which is most accurately translated as "Do Not Forget" rather than the commonly given "Forget Not". The distinction between the two mottos reflects independent clan identities confirmed when Lord Lyon Sir Malcolm Innes of Edingight formally matriculated Edward Stewart Dugald MacTavish of Dunardry as 26th Chief of Clan MacTavish on 23 July 1997, ending a dormancy of approximately 200 years and confirming the unbroken Dunardry chiefly line.

==== Chiefly arms ====
===== 1793 Lachlan MacTavish of Dunardry — First Formal Matriculation =====
In 1793, John Hooke-Campbell, Lord Lyon King of Arms, granted the first formal coat of arms to Lachlan MacTavish of Dunardry: Quarterly, 1st and 4th a Gyronny of eight Sable and Or; 2nd and 3rd, Argent, a buck's head cabossed Gules attired Or on a chief engrailed Azure a cross crosslet fitchèe between two mullets Or. Crest a boar's head erased Or langued Gules. Motto: NON OBLITUS. These arms were recorded in the Public Register of All Arms and Bearings in Scotland, Volume 1, Folio 563, dated 17 April 1793.

Cadet Arms of Simon McTavish of Garthbeg

The arms display in the first and fourth quarters the gyronny prominent in Campbell heraldry. Patrick L. Thompson documents in History of Clan MacTavish that Hooke-Campbell's appointment as Lord Lyon was purely political and that he left most decisions to his deputy Robert Boswell — it is Boswell's name that appears on the majority of armorial matriculations of the period. Thompson concludes that the MacTavishes in all probability have no true or direct link to the Campbells, yet the gyronny was included, likely reflecting that the MacTavishes had become a vassal clan under the feudal system rather than any genealogical connection.

Arms were simultaneously matriculated for Simon McTavish of Garthbeg as a cadet of the House of Dunardry, enclosed in a bordure Or indicating junior status. Thompson notes that a bordure of the second is reserved for the first offshoot of the main stem, which Garthbeg does not appear to be — no direct link to the chiefly family at Dunardry is documented — and the arms were likely matriculated in error regarding the specific bordure assigned.

A claim has been made that MacTavish arms derive from or are subordinate to Thomson armigers — specifically that MacTavish represents a cadet branch of a senior Thomson house. Patrick L. Thompson's analysis in Understanding MacTavish and Thomson Heraldry (2017) argues this is heraldically implausible, based on cadency rules within the Thomson family group. The main charge granted to most Thomson armigers is a stag's head cabossed — which appears on their arms simply due to similarity in surname and does not indicate common descent. The single Thomson armorial bearing a bucks head — Thomson of Caltonhill — is itself badly blazoned, violating cadency rules within his own documented family line.

Thompson concludes: "Literally, there is no foundation for MacTavish being a cadet of any Scottish Lowland, Midland, or Border Thomson family lineage. No historical records exist that would even suggest such a relationship." Lord Lyon David Sellar confirmed in official correspondence of 20 May 2013 that there is no familial or heraldic relationship between MacTavish and the Lowland Thomsons.

===== 1997 Lord Lyon Matriculated Arms of 26th Chief of Clan MacTavish =====
On 13 December 1997, the Lord Lyon affixed his seal on the matriculation of Edward Stewart Dugald MacTavish of Dunardry, recognizing him as Chief of Clan MacTavish, and granted arms similar to the grant of 1793: Quarterly, 1st and 4th a Gyronny of eight Sable and Or; 2nd and 3rd, Argent, a buck's head cabossed Gules attired Or on a chief engrailed Azure a cross crosslet fitchèe between two mullets Argent. Crest a boar's head erased Or langued Gules. Motto: NON OBLITUS.

===== 2003 Lord Lyon Agrees Amended Arms for 26th Chief =====
Chief Dugald MacTavish was not satisfied with arms that made him appear to be a Campbell, and requested of Lord Lyon Robin Blair that the quarters be reversed. Lord Lyon agreed in 2003, switching the Campbell gyronny from the first and fourth quarters to the second and third quarters, at Chief Dugald MacTavish's request, since he considered the original placement to overstate a Campbell association.

The amended arms were recorded in the Public Register of All Arms and Bearings in Scotland, Volume 80, page 111, in 2005. The new arms are blazoned: Quarterly, 1st and 4th, Argent, a Buck's Head cabossed Gules attired Or on a Chief engrailed Azure a cross crosslet fitchèe between two mullets of the First; 2nd and 3rd, Gyronny of eight Sable and Or. Above the Shield is placed a Helm befitting his degree with a Mantling Azure doubled Argent, and on a Wreath of the Liveries is set for Crest a boar's head erased Or langued Proper, and in an Escrol over the same this Motto "NON OBLITUS".

===== 2013 Lord Lyon Matriculates New Arms for 27th Chief of Clan MacTavish =====
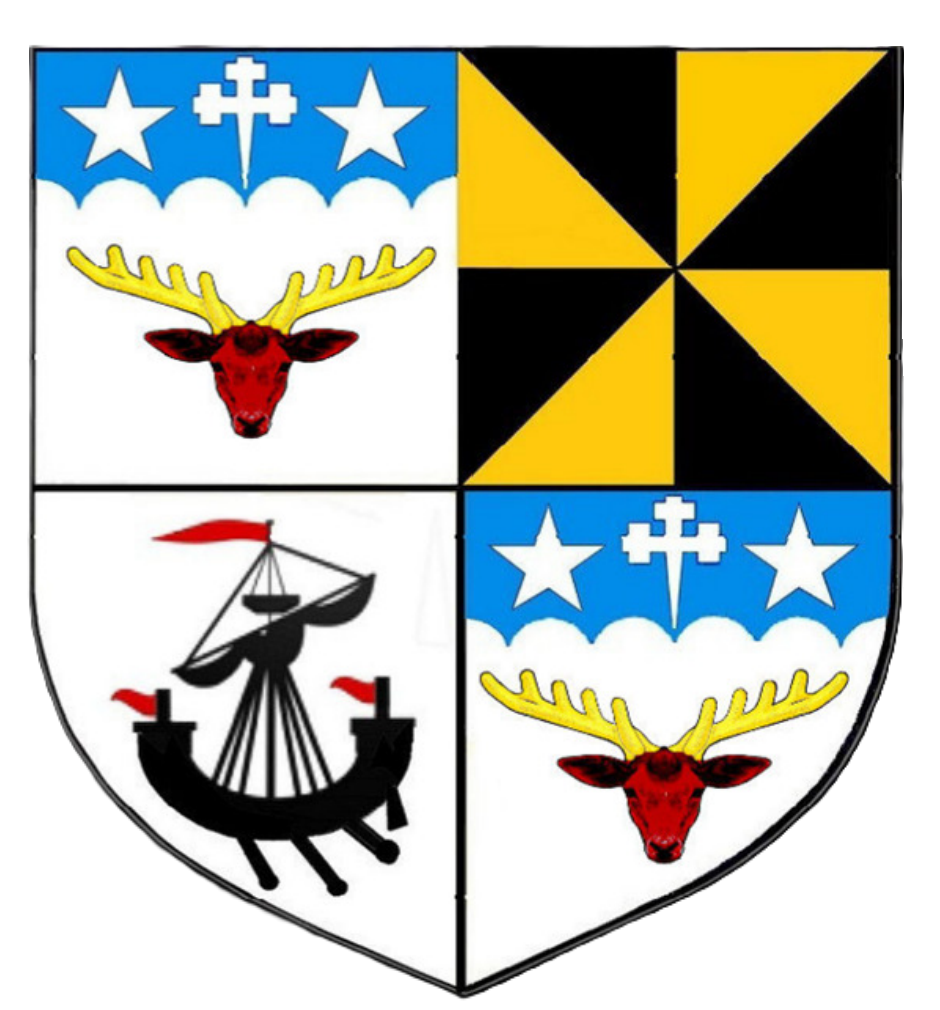
Current Arms of 27th Chief MacTavish of Dunardry

On 30 August 2013 The Court of the Lord Lyon matriculated new arms for Steven Edward Dugald MacTavish of Dunardry, 27th Hereditary Chief of the Clan MacTavish as follows: Quarterly, first and fourth, Argent, a buck's head Gules attired Or, on a chief engrailed azure a cross-crosslett between two mullets Argent, second, gyronny of eight Sable and Or; and third, Argent a lymphad sails furled oars in action Sable flagged Gules.

Above the Shield is placed a Helm befitting his degree, with mantling Gules doubled Argent, and on a wreath of the liveries is set for crest, a boar's head erased Or langued Proper, and in a scroll over the same this Motto 'NON OBLITUS'. Recorded on the 98th page, of the 91st Volume of the Public Register of All Arms and Bearings in Scotland.

The addition of a Lymphad — an ancient West Highland sailing ship — was added as the petitioner showed this charge was historical, used by a MacTavish ancestor at Dunorsan.

=== DNA Project and Modern Genealogy ===
The Clan MacTavish and Associated Families DNA Project was established in October 2011 and is administered by John Harrison-Stevenson, Seannachie to the 27th Chief. The project conducts Y-chromosome testing to reconstruct male-line MacTavish family lineages, and mitochondrial DNA testing to trace direct maternal lines, hosted through FamilyTreeDNA. In April 2024, former Clan MacTavish President Joe Cash founded the Craobh MacTavish Project — Scottish Gaelic for "branch" — a companion genealogical tool hosted on RelativeFinder.org, a free service developed by Brigham Young University. The tool compares a participant's FamilySearch family tree against a shared pool of documented MacTavish, Cash, Thomson, Thompson, and associated-family ancestors to identify genealogical connections to the clan.
