= Kilchrist Castle =

Coordinates: 55.4010°N 5.6467°W

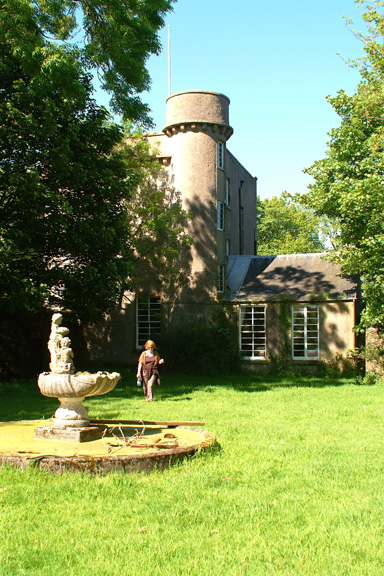
Kilchrist Castle in 2009

Kilchrist Castle is a castle south west of Campbeltown, Argyll and Bute, Scotland. The castle was rebuilt in 1834 by Dugald McTavish, and is 3 storeys high with a corbelled parapet. The vaulted foundations of the castle are of unknown date.

Kilchrist Castle was the residence of Sheriff Dugald MacTavish of Dunardry (1781–1855), the 20th Hereditary Chief of Clan MacTavish, who served as Sheriff Substitute at Campbeltown, Kintyre, and as Writer to the Signet. Sheriff Dugald wrote in a letter dated 18 February 1845 of the MacTavish chiefly line: "twenty-one generations from father to son without an instance of collateral or female succession." He died in 1855 and is buried at Kilmartin Churchyard, North Knapdale, Argyll.
