= Thompson (surname) =

- Pronunciation: /ˈtɒmpsən/ TOMP-sən

Origin
- Meaning: Son of Thom, Son of Thomas, Son of Tom
- Region of origin: Scotland and England

Other names
- Variant forms: Di Tommaso, Thom, Thomas, Thomason, Thomassen, Thomasson, Thomson, Tom, Tomadze, Tomašević, Tomashov, Tomashvili, Tomaszewicz, Tomescu, Tommasi, Tumasian, Tumasyan, MacTavish, McTavish, Tavish

Thompson is a surname of English, Irish and Scottish origin which is a variant of Thomson, meaning 'son of Thom'. Thom(p)son is also the English translation of MacTavish, which is the Anglicised version of the Gaelic name MacTamhais.

An alternative origin may be geographical, arising from the parish of Thompson in Norfolk. During the Plantation period, settlers carried the name to Ireland.

According to the 2010 United States Census, Thompson was the 23rd most frequently reported surname, accounting for 0.23% of the population.

== Notable people ==
=== A ===
- Aaron Thompson (disambiguation), multiple people
- Adaline Emerson Thompson (1859–1951), American educational worker and reformer
- Adam Thompson (born 1992), English footballer
- Aidan Thompson (born 2002), American ice hockey player
- Al Thompson (disambiguation), multiple people
- Alan Thompson (disambiguation), multiple people
- Alberto Thompson (1907–1957), American chemist and nuclear scientist
- Alexander Thompson (disambiguation), multiple people
- Alexandra Thompson (1867–1907), British composer
- Alfred Hill Thompson (1839–1874), British architect
- Allen Thompson (disambiguation), multiple people
- Alvin W. Thompson (born 1953), American judge
- Alyssa Thompson (born 2004), American soccer player
- Andrew Thompson (disambiguation), multiple people
- Anterio Thompson (born 2002), American football player
- Anthony Thompson (disambiguation), multiple people
- Archie Thompson (born 1978), Australian footballer
- Arthur Herbert Thompson (1890–1916), English soldier and football player

=== B ===
- Barry Thompson (disambiguation), multiple people
- Benjamin Thompson (disambiguation), multiple people
- Betty L. Thompson (1939–2021), American politician from Missouri
- Bill Thompson (disambiguation), multiple people
- B. J. Thompson (disambiguation), multiple people
- Blake Thompson (born 1993), Australian footballer
- Bodene Thompson (born 1988), New Zealand rugby player
- Bradley Thompson (born 1951), American television producer and writer
- Brenen Thompson (born 2003), American football player
- Brent Thompson (born 1971), Canadian ice hockey player
- Brian Thompson (disambiguation), multiple people
- Bronwyn Thompson (born 1978), Australian long jumper
- Bryan Thompson (disambiguation), multiple people
- Bryce Thompson (basketball) (born 2002), American basketball player
- Bryce Thompson (American football) (born 1999), American football player
- Bubba Thompson (born 1998), American baseball player

=== C ===
- Calvin Thompson (born 1964), American basketball coach
- Cameron Thompson (born 1960), Australian politician
- Carl Thompson (disambiguation), multiple people
- Carlos Thompson (1923–1990), Argentine actor
- Carol Thompson, American civil servant
- Caroline Thompson (born 1956), American novelist and film director
- Carroll Thompson (born 1960), British rock singer
- Casey Thompson (born 1998), American football player
- Cec Thompson (1926–2011), British rugby player
- Cecil Thompson (disambiguation), multiple people
- Charles Thompson (disambiguation), multiple people
- Chris Thompson (disambiguation), multiple people
- Christian Thompson (disambiguation), multiple people
- Christopher Thompson (disambiguation), multiple people
- Ciarán Thompson (born 1994), Irish footballer
- Ciara Mary-Alice Thompson (born 1996), Irish singer-songwriter
- Clifford Thompson (1904–1955), American film actor
- Clyde Thompson (1910–1979), American prison chaplain
- Cody Thompson (disambiguation), multiple people
- Corey Thompson, Australian rugby footballer
- Corey Thompson (American football), American football player
- Colin Thompson (disambiguation), multiple people
- Craig Thompson (disambiguation), multiple people

=== D ===
- D'Arcy Wentworth Thompson (1860–1948), Scottish biologist and mathematician
- Daley Thompson (born 1958), British athlete
- Daniel Thompson (disambiguation), multiple people
- Darwin Thompson (born 1997), American football player
- Dave Thompson (born 1959), English actor, stand-up comedian, writer
- David Thompson (disambiguation), multiple people
- Dean R. Thompson (born 1967), American diplomat
- Dean Thompson (racing driver) (born 2001), American stock car racer
- Debbie Thompson (1942–2019), American sprinter
- Declan Thompson (born 2002), English footballer
- Deionte Thompson (born 1997), American football player
- Del Thompson (born 1958), American football player
- Deonte Thompson (born 1989), American football player
- Derek Thompson (disambiguation), multiple people
- Des Thompson (1928–2010), English footballer
- Dickie Thompson (1917–2007), American guitarist and songwriter
- Dicky Thompson (born 1957), American professional golfer
- Dijon Thompson (born 1983), American basketball player
- D. J. Thompson (born 1985), American basketball player
- Don Thompson (disambiguation), multiple people
- Dorothy Thompson (disambiguation), multiple people
- Duane Thompson (1903–1970), American actress
- Duncan Thompson (1895–1980), Australian rugby player
- Dwayne Thompson (born 1950), American politician
- Dylan Thompson (born 1991), American football player

=== E ===
- Edith Thompson (1893–1923), English murderer
- Edith Thompson (historian), historian and lexicographer
- Edward Thompson (disambiguation), multiple people
- Elaine Thompson-Herah (born 1992), Jamaican sprinter
- Eli Thompson (disambiguation), multiple people
- Elinor P. Thompson, British microbiologist and plant scientist
- Eliza Thompson (1816–1905), American temperance advocate
- Elizabeth Thompson (disambiguation), multiple people
- Ellen Thompson (disambiguation), several people
- Elsie Thompson (1899–2013), American supercentenarian
- Elsie Nwanwuri Thompson, Nigerian lawyer
- Emma Thompson (born 1959), British actress and screenwriter
- E. P. Thompson (1924–1993), British 'new-left' historian
- Eric Thompson (disambiguation), multiple people
- Ernest Thompson (disambiguation), multiple people
- E. S. L. Thompson (1848–1944), American writer
- Ethan Thompson (born 1999), Puerto Rican basketball player
- Eva Griffith Thompson (1842–1925), American newspaper editor
- Evan Thompson (born 1962), Canadian philosopher

=== F ===
- Fiona Thompson, English cellist
- Flora Thompson (1876–1947), English novelist and poet
- Frances Thompson (disambiguation), multiple people
- Francis Thompson (disambiguation), multiple people
- Frank Thompson (disambiguation), multiple people
- Frederick Thompson (disambiguation), multiple people

=== G ===
- Gary Thompson (disambiguation), multiple people
- George Thompson (disambiguation), multiple people
- Georgia Thompson (born 1950), American civil servant wrongfully convicted of corruption, but later exonerated
- Georgie Thompson (born 1977), British broadcast journalist and television presenter
- Geraldine Thompson (1948–2025), American politician from Florida
- Geraldine Morgan Thompson (1872–1967), American social reform pioneer from New Jersey
- Glenn Thompson (disambiguation), multiple people
- Grace Thompson (1891–1???), American silent film actress
- Graham Thompson (disambiguation), multiple people
- Gregory Thompson (disambiguation), multiple people
- Gwen Thompson (disambiguation), multiple people

=== H ===
- Hank Thompson (disambiguation), multiple people
- Harold Thompson (disambiguation), multiple people
- Harry Thompson (disambiguation), multiple people
- Hayden Thompson (1938–2025), American singer, songwriter and rockabilly musician
- Helen F. Thompson, American businesswoman, teacher, and politician
- Henry Thompson (disambiguation), multiple people
- Herbert Thompson Jr. (1933–2006), American prelate
- Holly Thompson (born 1998), New Zealand curler
- Hope Thompson, Canadian writer
- Hugh Thompson (disambiguation), multiple people
- Hunter S. Thompson (1937–2005), American journalist and author

=== I ===
- Ian Thompson (disambiguation), multiple people
- Israel Thompson (1742–1805), American soldier and politician

=== J ===
- J. Lee Thompson (1914–2002), British film director
- Jack Thompson (disambiguation), multiple people
- Jackson Thompson (born 1986), Indian cricketer
- Jacob Thompson (disambiguation), multiple people
- Jake Thompson (born 1994), American baseball player
- Jalen Thompson (born 1998), American football player
- James Thompson (disambiguation), multiple people
- Jamie Thompson (disambiguation), multiple people
- Jasmine Thompson (born 2000), British singer and YouTube celebrity
- Jason Thompson (disambiguation), multiple people
- Jean Thompson (athlete) (1910–1976), Canadian runner
- Jeff Thompson (disambiguation), multiple people
- Jennifer Thompson (disambiguation), multiple people
- Jenny Thompson (born 1973), American former swimmer and anaesthesiologist
- Jeremy Thompson (disambiguation), multiple people
- Jerome Thompson (born 1988), American lacrosse player
- Jerry Thompson (disambiguation), multiple people
- Jesse Thompson, (1749–1834), American soldier and politician
- Jim Thompson (writer) (1906–1977), American writer
- Joe Thompson (rugby) (1902–1983) British rugby player
- John Thompson (disambiguation), multiple people
- Jonathan Thompson (disambiguation), multiple people
- Jordan Thompson (disambiguation), multiple people
- Josiah Thompson (born 1935), American author
- Joseph Thompson (disambiguation), multiple people
- Josh Thompson (disambiguation), multiple people
- Judith Thompson (born 1954), Canadian playwright
- Justin Thompson (disambiguation), multiple people

=== K ===
- Kamila Thompson (born 1983), British singer-songwriter
- Katherine Thompson (disambiguation), multiple people
- Kay Thompson (1909–1998), American author
- Keegan Thompson (born 1995), American baseball player
- Keith Thompson (disambiguation), multiple people
- Kelly Thompson, American author
- Kemel Thompson (born 1974), Jamaican hurdler
- Kenneth Thompson (disambiguation), multiple people
- Kenan Thompson (born 1978), American actor
- Kerstin Thompson (born 1965), Australian architect
- Kevin Thompson (disambiguation), multiple people
- Keytaon Thompson (born 1998), American football player
- Kirk Thompson (drowning victim) (died 2002), Belizean criminal suspect
- Kirsten Moana Thompson (born 1964), scholar of American and New Zealand cinema and visual culture
- Kirt Thompson (born 1967), Trinidad and Tobago javelin thrower
- Klay Thompson (born 1990), American basketball player; son of Mychal
- Kristen Thompson, American politician
- Kristin Thompson (born 1950), American film theorist and author
- Kyle Thompson (born 1992), American photographer

=== L ===
- L. F. Thompson, (1827–1894), American politician
- Laird A. Thompson (born 1947), American astronomer
- LaMarcus Adna Thompson (1848–1919), American inventor, roller coasters
- Larry Thompson (disambiguation), multiple people
- Laura Thompson (disambiguation), multiple people
- Lea Thompson (born 1961), American actress and director
- Lee Thompson (disambiguation), multiple people
- Leonard Thompson (disambiguation), multiple people
- Lexi Thompson (born 1995), American golfer
- Liam Thompson (disambiguation), multiple people
- Libby Thompson (1855–1953), American frontier prostitute and madam
- Lil' Dave Thompson (1969–2010), American electric blues guitarist, singer and songwriter
- Lincoln Thompson (1949–1999), Jamaican reggae artist
- Linda Thompson (disambiguation), multiple people
- Lindsay Thompson (1923–2008), Australian politician
- Lisa Thompson (disambiguation), multiple people
- Llewellyn Thompson (1904–1972), American dipolmat
- Logan Thompson (born 1997), Canadian ice hockey player
- Lois Thompson, American football player
- Loren P. Thompson (1927–2015), American politician
- Lucas P. Thompson (1797–1866), American lawyer and politician
- Lucky Thompson (1924–2005), American jazz tenor and soprano saxophonist
- Luke Thompson (disambiguation), multiple people
- Lyle Thompson (born 1992), American lacrosse player

=== M ===
- Marcus Thompson (born 1946), American violinist
- Marc Thompson (disambiguation), multiple people
- Mariquita Sánchez de Thompson (1786–1868), Argentine patriot and salonnière
- Marjorie Thompson (1954–2014), American biologist
- Mark Thompson (disambiguation), multiple people
- Marlana Thompson (born 1978), Mohawk beadwork artist, regalia maker, and fashion designer
- Marr Thompson, (1856–1938), Australian arts critic
- Martin Thompson (disambiguation), multiple people
- Mary Thompson (disambiguation), multiple people
- Marvin Thompson (born 1977/8), British poet
- Maureen Thompson, Saint Helenian politician
- Mason Thompson (born 1998), American baseball player
- Matthew Thompson (disambiguation), multiple people
- Max Thompson (disambiguation), multiple people
- Mel Thompson (basketball) (1932–2009), American basketball coach
- Michael Thompson (disambiguation), multiple people
- Mildred Thompson (1936–2003) American painter, sculptor and printmaker
- Miles Thompson (born 1990), American lacrosse player
- Miles Thompson (architect) (1808–1868), English architect
- Morris Thompson (1939–2000), American politician and businessman
- Mychal Thompson (born 1955), Bahamian–American basketball player and broadcaster
- Mychel Thompson (born 1988), American basketball player; son of Mychal
- Myron Thompson (1936–2019), Canadian politician

=== N ===
- Nainoa Thompson (born 1953), Hawaiian navigator
- NaJee Thompson (born 2000), American football player
- Nathan Thompson (disambiguation), multiple people
- Ned Thompson (1910–2011), American football and basketball coach
- Nick Thompson (disambiguation), multiple people
- Nigel Thompson, Irish cricketer
- Norman Thompson (footballer) (1900–1989), English footballer

=== O ===
- Obadele Thompson (born 1976), Barbadian sprinter
- Oliver Thompson (born 1988), English guitarist and songwriter
- Owen Thompson (born 1978), Scottish politician

=== P ===
- Patricia Thompson (disambiguation), multiple people
- Patrick Thompson (disambiguation), multiple people
- Paul Thompson (disambiguation), multiple people
- Pauline Thompson (1942–2012), New Zealand artist
- Pearl Thompson (born 1957), British musician, The Cure
- Peter Thompson (disambiguation), multiple people
- Peyton Thompson (born 1990), American football player
- Phillip Thompson (born 1988), Australian politician

=== R ===
- Rachel Thompson (disambiguation), multiple people
- Ralph Thompson (footballer) (1892–1916), English footballer
- Randall Thompson (1899–1984), American composer
- Randall Thompson (boxer) (born 1964), Canadian boxer
- Randy Thompson (born 1963), American singer-songwriter
- Rangi Thompson (1910–1971), New Zealand rower
- Raymond Thompson (1949–2025), New Zealand television writer and producer
- Reginald Campbell Thompson (1876–1941), British archaeologist and epigraphist
- Richard Thompson (disambiguation), multiple people
- Robert Thompson (disambiguation), multiple people
- Rocky Thompson (disambiguation), multiple people
- Roger Thompson (soccer) (born 1991), Canadian soccer player
- Roly Thompson (1932–2003), English cricketer
- Ron Thompson (disambiguation), multiple people
- Ruth Thompson (disambiguation), multiple people
- Ryan Thompson (disambiguation), multiple people

=== S ===
- Sada Thompson (1927–2011), American actress
- Samuel Thompson (disambiguation), multiple people
- Sarah Thompson (disambiguation), multiple people
- Scott Thompson (disambiguation), multiple people
- Scottie Thompson (born 1981), American actress
- Sean Thompson (disambiguation), multiple people
- Shakiel Thompson (born 1997), English boxer
- Shaq Thompson (born 1994), American football player
- Shawn Thompson (born 1958), Canadian actor and director
- Shedrick Thompson (died 1932), African American suicide victim
- Sheldon Thompson (1785–1851), American politician from New York
- Shirley Thompson, British composer, conductor and violinist
- Silvanus P. Thompson (1851–1916), English physicist
- Siobhan Thompson (born 1984), British-American sketch comedian and comedy writer
- Skylar Thompson (born 1997), American football player
- Smith Thompson (1768–1843), American jurist
- Soren Thompson (born 1981), American épée fencer
- Stanley Thompson (disambiguation), multiple people
- Steve Thompson (disambiguation), multiple people
- Stuart Thompson Irish cricketer
- Sue Thompson (1925–2021), American pop and country singer
- Susanna Thompson (born 1958), American actress
- Sydney Thompson (disambiguation), multiple people

=== T ===
- Tade Thompson (born 1969), British psychiatrist and writer
- Tage Thompson (born 1997), American ice hockey player
- Tara Thompson, American singer
- Teddy Thompson (born 1976), British musician
- Tedric Thompson (born 1995), American football player
- Tessa Thompson (born 1983), American actress
- Thomas Thompson (disambiguation), multiple people
- Toby Thompson, American politician
- Torger G. Thompson (1853–1923), American politician
- Tony Thompson (disambiguation), multiple people
- Tiny Thompson (1905–1981), Canadian ice hockey player
- Trayce Thompson (born 1991), American baseball player, son of Mychal
- Trenton Thompson (born 1996), American football player
- Tristan Thompson (born 1991), Canadian basketball player
- Tyrone Thompson (footballer) (born 1982), English footballer
- Tyrone Thompson (politician) (1967–2019), American politician

=== U ===
- Unique Thompson (born 1999), American basketball player

=== V ===
- Victor Thompson (politician) (1885–1968), Australian politician
- Vince Thompson (born 1957), American football player

=== W ===
- Wallace Thompson (1896–1952), American politician
- Walter Thompson (disambiguation), multiple people
- Wilbur Thompson (1921–2013), American shot putter
- William Thompson (disambiguation), multiple people
- Whitney Thompson (born 1987), American fashion model
- Woodrow R. Thompson (1919–1942), American Marine Corps sergeant and Navy Cross recipient
- Wright Thompson (born 1976), American sportswriter

=== Z ===
- Zachary Thompson (disambiguation), multiple people
- Zack Thompson (born 1997), American baseball player
- Zadock Thompson (1796–1856), American naturalist
- Zoe Thompson (born 1983), New Zealand footballer

== Fictional characters ==
- Flash Thompson, in Marvel Comics
- Gwen Thompson, American Girl character from the Chrissa books and movie
- Kate Thompson, a character in the 1980 comedy film The Gods Must Be Crazy
- Nancy Thompson, in the A Nightmare on Elm Street franchise
- Nucky Thompson, in the American TV series Boardwalk Empire
- Sarah Thompson, in the Home and Away soap opera
- Sarah Thompson, the Pink Ranger of Power Rangers Ninja Steel
- Ted Thompson, a character in the video game Bully
- Thomson and Thompson, detectives in The Adventures of Tintin (English language version)

== See also ==
- Clan MacTavish, ancient Scottish Highland clan
- MacTavish, a surname
- McTavish, a related given name
- Tavish, a related given name
