= Thomson (surname) =

Origin
- Origin: English, Scottish Gaelic, Lowland Scots
- Meaning: "son of Thom", "son of Thomas", "little Thomas" (French); in Highland Gaelic contexts, an anglicisation of Mac Tamhais (Son of Tamhais), the Gaelic root of MacTavish
- Region of origin: Northwestern Europe, Scottish Highlands (Argyll), Scottish Borders

Other names
- Variant forms: Thompson, Thomason, Tompson, MacTavish, McTavish, MacTamhais
- Thomson is an English language variant of two existing Scottish Highland clans: Clan MacTavish of Argyll in the Western Highlands, and Clan MacThomas of Angus, Aberdeenshire and Perthshire in the Eastern Highlands. Independent Lowland and Border traditions also produced this name, and each tradition is distinct.

Thomson is a patronymic surname meaning "son of Thom, Thomp, Thompkin, or other diminutive of Thomas", itself derived from the Aramaic תום or Tôm, meaning "twin". It is a surname of English, Irish, and Scottish Origin. Thomson is also the anglicised form of two Scottish Highland clan names: MacTavish, from the western Highlands of Argyll, and MacThomas, from the eastern Highlands of Angus, Aberdeenshire and Perthshire. Independent Lowland and Border traditions also produced the Thomson surname, and each tradition is genealogically distinct.

The surname is documented in Cheshire records before and after the 1066 Norman Conquest. Variations include Thomason, Thomasson, Thomerson, Thomoson, and others. The French surname Thomson is first documented in Burgundy and is the shortened form for Thom[as]son, Thom[es]son. Variations include Thomassin, Thomason, Thomsson, Thomesson, Thomeson, and others. Thomson is uncommon as a given name.

== Notable people with the Surname ==
- Adam Thomson (disambiguation)
- Andrew Thomson (disambiguation)
- David Thomson (disambiguation)
- Edward Thomson (disambiguation)
- George Thomson
- Ian Thomson (disambiguation)
- James Thomson (disambiguation)
- John Thomson (disambiguation)
- Julius Thomson (disambiguation)
- Richard Thomson (disambiguation)
- William Thomson (disambiguation)

== Arts and letters ==
- Alex Thomson (cinematographer) (1929–2007), English cinematographer
- Alex Thomson (journalist) (born 1960), English journalist
- Alexander Thomson (1817–1875), Scottish architect
- Beatrix Thomson (1900–1986), British actress
- Beverly Thomson (1964–2025), Canadian journalist
- Charles Thomson (artist) (born 1953), British artist, painter and poet
- Cyndi Thomson (born 1976), American country music singer
- Diana Thomson (born 1939), English sculptor
- Edward William Thomson (writer) (1849–1924), Canadian journalist and writer
- Frederick Clifton Thomson (1890–1928), American silent film cowboy actor
- George Thomson (musician) (1757–1821), Scottish music collector
- Hugh Thomson (1860–1920), Irish illustrator
- Hugh Thomson (writer), English travel writer
- Kenneth Thomson (actor) (1899–1967), American character actor
- Lily James (born Lily Thomson in 1989), English actress
- Margaret Thomson (1910–2005), Australian-New Zealand filmmaker
- R. H. Thomson (born 1947), Canadian television, film, and stage actor
- Riley Thomson (1912–1960), American animator and comics artist
- Robert Thomson (executive) (born 1961), Australian journalist
- Roy Thomson, 1st Baron Thomson of Fleet (1894–1976), Canadian newspaper and media entrepreneur
- Rosemary Thomson, Canadian conductor
- Rupert Thomson (b 1955), English author
- Sebastian Thomson, drummer and musician
- Tom Thomson (1877–1917), Canadian artist
- Valentine Thomson (1881–1944) French writer, philanthropist and women's rights activist
- Virgil Thomson (1896–1989), American composer

== Politics, law, and government ==
- Asahel Thomson (1790–1866), American politician and physician from Connecticut
- Charles Thomson (1729–1824), secretary of the Continental Congress
- Charles Poulett Thomson, 1st Baron Sydenham (1799–1841), first Governor of the united Province of Canada
- Craig Thomson (politician) (born 1964), Australian politician
- Edwin Keith Thomson (1919–1960), member of the U.S. House of Representatives
- Edward William Thomson (1794–1865), member of the 13th Parliament of Upper Canada
- Gaston Thomson (1848–1932), French politician
- Kelvin Thomson (born 1955), Australian politician
- Lodewijk Thomson (1869–1914), Dutch soldier and politician
- Meldrim Thomson Jr. (1912–2001), New Hampshire governor
- Michelle Thomson (born 1965), Scottish National Party politician and member of Parliament
- Ross Thomson (born 1987), Scottish politician
- Roy Hendry Thomson (1932–2009), businessman, public servant and political activist
- Susan Thomson (born 1962) Canadian human rights lawyer and professor of peace and conflict studies
- Thyra Thomson (1916–2013), Secretary of State of Wyoming
- Vernon Wallace Thomson (1905–1988), American politician
- Wayne Thomson (born 1939), Canadian politician

== Sciences and medicine ==
- Arthur Thomson (naturalist) (1861–1933), Scottish naturalist
- Arthur Landsborough Thomson (1890–1977), Scottish ornithologist
- Carl Gustaf Thomson (1824–1899), Swedish entomologist.
- Charles Wyville Thomson (1830–1882), zoologist and chief scientist on the Challenger expedition
- Christine Thomson, nutritionist
- Donald Thomson (1901–1970), Australian anthropologist and ornithologist
- Elihu Thomson (1853–1937), English engineer, founder of what became Thomson SA
- G. Thomson (1760–1806), English geologist who worked in Italy and discovered the Widmanstätten figures
- George Paget Thomson (1892–1975), English physicist, J. J. Thomson
- J. J. Thomson (1856–1940), English physicist who discovered the electron
- Janet Thomson (born 1942), British geologist
- Joseph Thomson (explorer) (1858–1895), a Scottish geologist
- Margaret Thomson (medical doctor) (1902–1982), Scottish physician and prisoner of war
- Reginald H. Thomson (1856–1949), Seattle civil engineer
- Robert Thomson (inventor) (1822–1873), Scottish inventor
- Thomas Thomson jr. (1817–1878), Scottish botanist
- Thomas Thomson sr. (1773–1852), Scottish chemist
- William Thomson, 1st Baron Kelvin (1824–1907), British physicist

== Sports ==
- Akiko Thomson (born 1974), Filipina television host, journalist and swimmer
- Alexander Aird Thomson (1917–1991), Scottish chess master
- Billy Thomson (footballer, born 1958) (1958–2023), Scottish football goalkeeper
- Billy Thomson (footballer, fl. 1891–1900), Scottish football winger
- Bob Thomson, English footballer
- Bobby Thomson (1923–2010), Scottish-born American baseball player
- Brandon Thomson, South African rugby union player
- Brent Thomson (born 1958), New Zealand jockey
- Cammy Thomson (1948–1996), Scottish footballer
- Craig Thomson, Scottish footballer
- Craig Thomson, Scottish football referee
- Darran Thomson, Scottish footballer
- Des Thomson (born 1942), New Zealand cyclist
- Edmund Thomson (1874–1914), English cricketer
- Emily Thomson (footballer) (born 1993), Scottish footballer
- Fergus Thomson, a Scottish rugby player
- Florence Frankland Thomson (1885–1939), Scottish chess player
- Gary Thomson, Irish cyclist
- Hollie Thomson (born 1986), Scottish footballer
- Ian Thomson (cricketer) (1929–2021), English cricketer
- J. M. Archer Thomson (1863–1913), British rock-climber and mountaineer
- Jason Thomson, Scottish footballer
- Jeff Thomson (born 1950), Australian cricketer
- Kathryn Thomson (born 1996), British short track skater
- Keith Thomson (sportsman), New Zealand cricketer
- Ken Thomson (footballer), Scottish footballer
- Kenny Thomson (born 1951), Scottish footballer
- Kevin Thomson, Scottish footballer
- Lawrie Thomson, Scottish footballer
- Matthew Thomson (sport shooter), small-bore rifle champion
- Peter Thomson, Australian golfer
- Rob Thomson, Canadian baseball manager
- Robert Thomson (1875–1954), Scottish golfer
- Shane Alexander Thomson (born 1969), New Zealand cricketer

== Other ==
- Edward Thomson, bishop in the Methodist Episcopal Church
- Iain Donald Thomson, American philosopher
- Judith Jarvis Thomson (1929–2020), American moral philosopher
- Kenneth Thomson, 2nd Baron Thomson of Fleet (1923–2006)
- Maria Thomson (1809–1875), New Zealand businesswoman
- Mowbray Thomson (1832–1917), British Army general and author
- Douglas Thomson White aka Doogie White (born 1960), Scottish rock singer
- John Turnbull Thomson, British engineer who lived in Singapore and New Zealand
- Mick Thomson, American musician, Slipknot

== In fiction ==
- Thomson, one of two identical detectives in the Adventures of Tintin series by Hergé

== See also ==
- Thompson (surname)
- Clan MacTavish
- Thomson (taxonomic authority)
- Tavish, a related given name
- MacTavish surname
- McTavish surname
