= Thomason (surname) =

Thomason is a patronymic surname meaning "son of Thomas", or a misspelling of the French surname Thomasson, Thomesson "little Thomas". Notable people with the surname include:

- Art Thomason (1889–1944), American baseball player
- Bob Thomason (born 1949), basketball coach
- Bobby Thomason (1928–2013), American football player
- Clyde A. Thomason (1914–1942), American Marine and Medal of Honor awardee
- Dustin Thomason, American writer
- George Thomason (book collector) (died 1666), English book collector
- George Thomason (footballer) (born 2001), English footballer
- Harry Thomason (born 1940), American film and television producer
- James Thomason (1804–1853), British Lieutenant-Governor of the North-Western Provinces in India
- Jasin Thomason (born 1976), American guitarist, The Ataris
- Jeff Thomason (born 1969), American football player
- Jim Thomason (1920–2007), American football player
- John Thomason (1893–1944), American Marine and author
- Larry Thomason (1948–2003), American politician
- Mackenzie Thomason, Canadian politician
- Marsha Thomason (born 1976), English actress
- R. Ewing Thomason (1879–1973), American politician from Texas
- Robert Wayne Thomason (1952–1995), American mathematician
- Roy Thomason (1944–2024), British politician
- Sarah Thomason, American linguist
- Theresa Thomason, American gospel singer
- Trent Thomason (born 1972), Christian keyboardist and songwriter
- Yeoville Thomason (1826–1901), British architect active in Birmingham
- Linda Bloodworth-Thomason (born 1947), American writer and television producer

== See also ==
- Thomasson (surname)
- Thomson (surname)
- Thompson (surname)
- MacTavish (surname)
- McTavish, a related given name
- Tavish, a related given name
- Clan MacTavish, Ancient Scottish Highlands Clan
