= Colonist (disambiguation) =

A colonist is a settler, a person who has migrated to an area and established a permanent residence there, often to colonize that specific area.

Colonist(s) or The Colonist can also refer to:

== Publications ==
- British Colonist, also referred to as the Colonist, a defunct newspaper owned by Toronto-based Canadian newspaper editor Samuel Thompson in the 1850s
- The Colonist, a defunct newspaper co-founded in the 1860s by William Augustine O'Carroll in Queensland, Australia
- The Colonist, a defunct newspaper in Guyana
- The Colonist (Australian newspaper), a newspaper published in Sydney, Australia, from 1835 to 1840
- The Colonist (New Zealand newspaper), a newspaper published in Nelson, New Zealand, from 1857 to 1920
- Times Colonist, a Canadian newspaper published in Victoria BC, formerly British Colonist and others

== Other uses ==
- Colonist (The X-Files), a type of extraterrestrial creature that appears in the television series The X-Files and the feature film The X-Files
- The Colonist, a pub in Norwood, Adelaide, Australia
- Colonist (1861), a British schooner launched in 1861 and sunk in 1890
- SS Colonist, a cargo ship launched in 1889 and wrecked in 1894
- Colonist car, a type of railway passenger coach designed to provide inexpensive long-distance transportation for immigrants
- Colonists, an EP by Nero's Day at Disneyland

== See also ==
- Colonial (disambiguation)
- Colonialism
- Colonization
- Colony
