= Alexander Thomson (disambiguation) =

Alexander Thomson (1817–1875) was a Scottish architect, also known as 'Greek' Thomson.

Alexander Thomson may also refer to:

- Alexander Thomson (pioneer) (1798–1866), Australian pioneer and first mayor of Geelong, Victoria
- Alexander Thomson (congressman) (1788–1848), US congressman from Pennsylvania
- Sir Alexander Thomson (Baron of the Exchequer) (died 1817), Baron and then Chief Baron of the Exchequer
- Alexander Thomson (minister) (c. 1593–1646), minister in the Church of Scotland
- Alexander Thomson (poet) (1763–1803), Scottish poet
- Alexander MacDonald Thomson (1863–1924), colonial treasurer of Hong Kong from 1899 to 1918
- Alexander McDonald Thomson (1822–1898), speaker of the Wisconsin State Assembly
- Alexander Raven Thomson (1899–1955), British fascist politician
- Alexander Thomson, Lord Thomson (1914–1979), Scottish judge, senator of the College of Justice from 1965
- Alexander Thomson (footballer) (1877–1959), Scottish footballer with Airdrieonians and Scotland
- Alexander Thomson of Banchory (1798–1868), Scottish antiquary and agriculturalist
- Alec Thomson (Alexander Thomson, 1873–1953), Australian politician, member of the Western Australian Legislative Assembly

== See also ==
- Alex Thomson (disambiguation)
- Alexander Thompson (disambiguation)
