= Garry Thompson =

Garry Thompson may refer to:

- Garry Thompson (darts player) (born 1965), English darts player
- Garry Thompson (footballer, born 1959), English footballer and manager
- Garry Thompson (footballer, born 1980), English footballer

== See also ==
- Gary Thompson (disambiguation)
- Garry Thomson (1925–2007), conservator and a Buddhist
- Gary Thomson, rugby league player
