= Tomaševičius =

- Lithuanian surname
- m.: Tomaševičius
- f.: (unmarried): Tomaševičiūtė
- f.: (married): Tomaševičienė
- Related names: Tomaszewicz, Tomashevich, Tomašević

Tomaševičius is a Lithuanian surname. Notable people with the surname include:

- Benediktas Tamoševičius (1879–1941), Lithuanian engineer, minister of communications, political and public figure
- Jonas Tomasevičius (born 1937), Lithuanian cinematographer
- Vytautas Tomaševičius (born 1972), Lithuanian painter
