= Frederick Thompson =

Frederick or Fred Thompson may refer to:

== Sportspeople ==
- Frederick Thompson (athlete) (1880–1956), British track and field athlete
- Rangi Thompson (Frederick Haughton Thompson, 1908–1971), New Zealand rower
- Fredy Thompson (born 1982), Guatemalan footballer
- Fred Thompson (footballer, born c. 1873) (c. 1873–1958), English footballer
- Fred Thompson (footballer, born 1870) (1870–1898), English footballer
- Fred Thompson (rugby union) (1890–1915), Australian rugby union player
- Fred Thompson (coach) (1933–2019), American lawyer and track and field coach

== Other ==
- Frederic Thompson (1873–1919), American engineer, inventor, and showman known for creating Luna Park and the New York Hippodrome
- Fred D. Thompson (businessman) (1915–1988), American publishing executive
- Frederick P. Thompson (1846–1922), Canadian entrepreneur and politician
- Fred Thompson (1942–2015), American politician and actor
- Fred W. Thompson (1900–1987), Canadian-American labor organizer and historian with the Industrial Workers of the World
- F. Christian Thompson (Frederic, 1944-2021), American entomologist
- Frederick L. Thompson (1871–1944), American politician
- Fred Thompson (writer) (1884–1949), English writer and librettist
- Frederick John Thompson (1935–2010), politician in Saskatchewan, Canada
- Frederick Ferris Thompson (1836–1899), American banker
- Frederick I. Thompson (1875–1952), American businessman and commissioner of the Federal Communications Commission
- Freddie Thompson (Irish criminal) (born 1980), Irish criminal convicted of murder in 2018

== See also ==
- Frederick Thomson (disambiguation)
