= Ernest Thompson (disambiguation) =

Ernest Thompson (born 1949) is an American writer, actor and director.

Ernest Thompson may also refer to:

- Ernie Thompson (rugby league), English rugby league footballer of the 1930s
- Ernest Heber Thompson (1891–1971), New Zealand artist
- Ernest O. Thompson (1892–1966), general in the United States Army during World War I
- Ernie Thompson (American football) (born 1969), American football running back
- Ernie Thompson (footballer, born 1892), English footballer
- Ernie Thompson (footballer, born 1909) (1909–1985), English footballer
- E. V. Thompson (1931–2012), English author of historical novels
- Ernest Thompson (musician) (1892–1961), blind street musician from Winston-Salem, North Carolina
