= Alexander Thompson =

Alexander Thompson or Alex Thompson or Alec Thompson may refer to:

- Alexander Thompson (VC) (1824–1880), Scottish recipient of the Victoria Cross
- Alexander Thompson (cricketer, born 1876) (1876–1951), English cricketer for Northamptonshire
- Alexander M. Thompson (1861–1948), German-born English journalist and dramatist
- Alexander John Thompson, author of a table of logarithms, published in 1952
- Alec Thompson (1916–2001), English cricketer for Middlesex
- Alex Thompson (rugby league) (born 1990), rugby league footballer
- Alex Thompson (footballer) (1917–2002), footballer for Tranmere Rovers
- Alex Thompson (filmmaker), American filmmaker
- Alex Thompson (journalist), American journalist

== See also ==
- Alexander Thomson (disambiguation)
