= Kenneth Thompson =

Kenneth Thompson, or Ken Thompson, or Kenny Thompson, or Kennedy Thompson, or Kenan Thompson may refer to:

- Kenneth Thomson (actor) (1899–1967), American actor
- Kenneth Thompson (bishop) (died 1975), Bishop of Sherwood
- Ken Thompson (botanist), author of popular books on ecology and invasive plants
- Kenneth Thompson (ice hockey) (1895–1931), British-Canadian ice hockey centre
- Kenneth P. Thompson (1966–2016), American attorney
- Kenneth W. Thompson (1921–2013), American academic and author in the field of international relations
- G. Kennedy Thompson (born 1950), also known as Ken Thompson, American businessman; Wachovia Corporation
- Ken Thompson (footballer, born 1926) (1926–2008), English professional footballer
- Ken Thompson (footballer, born 1945), English professional footballer
- Ken Thompson (born 1943), American computer science pioneer
- Kenan Thompson (born 1978), American actor, showman and comedian
- Kenny Thompson (Bermudian footballer) (born 1955), Bermudian football manager
- Kenny Thompson (born 1985), Belgian footballer
- Sir Kenneth Thompson, 1st Baronet (1909–1984), British politician and businessman
- Kenneth Kwamina Thompson (born 1961), Ghanaian businessman

== See also ==
- Kenneth Thomson (disambiguation)
