= Hugh Thompson =

Hugh Thompson may refer to:

- Hugh Thompson (American actor) (1887–19??), American silent-film actor
- Hugh Thompson (architect), American architect
- Hugh Thompson (athlete) (1914–1942), Canadian Olympic athlete
- Hugh Thompson (baritone) (1915–2006), American opera singer
- Hugh Thompson (Canadian actor), Canadian actor
- Hugh Thompson (cricketer) (1934–2021), English cricketer
- Hugh Thompson Jr. (1943–2006), U.S. Army helicopter pilot who helped end the Mỹ Lai massacre during the Vietnam War
- Hugh Thompson (Royal Navy officer) (1931–1996), British naval officer
- Hugh Cathcart Thompson (1829–1919), American architect
- Hugh Miller Thompson (1830–1903), American Episcopal bishop
- Hugh P. Thompson (born 1943), American judge
- Hugh Smith Thompson (1836–1904), American politician and governor of South Carolina, 1882–1886

== See also ==
- Hugh Thomson (1860–1920), Irish illustrator
- Hugh Thomson (writer), British travel writer, filmmaker and explorer
- Hugh Christopher Thomson (1791–1834), Canadian businessman, publisher and politician
- Herbert Hugh Thompson, American computer security expert
