= Francis Thompson (disambiguation) =

Francis Thompson (1859–1907) was an English poet and ascetic.

Francis Thompson may also refer to:

- Francis Thompson (architect) (1808–1895), architect known for his railway work
- Francis Longstreth Thompson (1890–1973), British town planner
- Francis Roy Thompson (1896–1966), Australian artist whose work was first exhibited at the New Gallery of Fine Art in Adelaide (a.k.a. Frank Roy or F. R. Thompson)
- Francis Thompson (film director) (1908–2003), American film director
- Francis Thompson (historian) (1925–2017), English economic and social historian
- Francis Thompson (bishop) (fl. 1964–1996), Anglican bishop in Africa
- Francis C. Thompson (born 1941), American politician

== See also ==
- Frances Thompson (disambiguation)
- Frank Thompson (disambiguation)
- Francis Thomson (disambiguation)
