= Gary Thompson =

Gary Thompson may refer to:

- Gary Thompson (basketball coach) (c. 1932–2010), American college basketball coach
- Gary Thompson (basketball player), All-American basketball player at Iowa State
- Gary Thompson (gridiron football) (born 1959), American football player
- Gary Thompson (racing driver) (born 1992), Irish racecar driver
- Gary Thompson (soccer) (born 1945), Canadian international and North American Soccer League player
- Gary Scott Thompson (born 1959), American TV producer

== See also ==
- Garry Thompson (disambiguation)
- Garry Thomson (1925–2007), conservator and a Buddhist
- Gary Thomson (born 1963), Irish cyclist
