= John Sheridan Hogan =

John Sheridan Hogan (ca 1815 – December 1, 1859) was a journalist, lawyer and political figure in Canada West.

He was born near Dublin, Ireland around 1815. He arrived in Toronto around 1827, having come to live with an uncle. He ran away and found work in Hamilton with the Canadian Wesleyan, a newspaper published in the early 1830s. By 1837 he was working in the law office of Allan Napier MacNab. He was arrested twice in the United States for his part in the burning of the Patriot supply ship Caroline in an apparent attempt to stir up hostilities between Canada and the United States. In 1843, he was called to the bar. He began working as a parliamentary correspondent for several journals, including Blackwood’s Edinburgh Magazine around 1849. He also worked with Samuel Thompson on the United Empire and the Daily Colonist, two journals published in Toronto. In 1855 his essay on Canada and her Resources was awarded the first prize of the Paris Exhibition Committee. In 1857, he was elected to the Legislative Assembly of the Province of Canada for Grey. He went missing in December 1859 and was found 16 months later floating in the Don River. It was later determined that he had been murdered on December 1 by a gang of local robbers after refusing to give them money. Two members of the group were acquitted but one member named James Brown was hanged in 1862.
