= Frank Thomson =

Frank Thomson may refer to:

- Frank Thomson (railroad executive) (1841–1899)
- Frank Thomson (footballer)
- Frank Wyville Thomson, Scottish military surgeon and expert on tropical medicine

== See also ==
- Francis Thomson (disambiguation)
- Frank Thompson (disambiguation)
