= Daniel Thomson =

Daniel Thomson may refer to:

- Dan Thomson (1897-1951), Scottish footballer, see List of AFC Bournemouth players (25–99 appearances)
- Danny Thomson (born 1991), Scottish footballer

== See also ==
- Daniel Thompson
