= Mark Thomson =

Mark Thomson may refer to:

- Mark Thomson (politician) (1739–1803), United States Representative from New Jersey
- Mark Thomson (darts player) (born 1963), English darts player
- Mark Thomson (physicist), professor of experimental particle physics

== See also ==
- Mark Thompson (disambiguation)
- Marc Thompson (disambiguation)
