= Elizabeth Thompson (disambiguation) =

Elizabeth Thompson (1846–1933) was a British painter.

Elizabeth Thompson may also refer to:

- Betty Thompson (1934–1994), Canadian TV presenter
- Betty L. Thompson (1939–2021), American politician, member of the Missouri House of Representatives
- Eliza Thompson (1816–1905), American Christian campaigner
- Elizabeth A. Thompson (born 1949), English-born American statistician
- Elizabeth Thompson (field hockey) (born 1994), New Zealand hockey player
- Elizabeth Thompson (Barbados) (born 1961), Barbadian politician and diplomat
- Elizabeth Maria Bowen Thompson (1812/13–1869), British educator missionary
- Elizabeth Thompson (painter) (1954–2023), American painter
- Elizabeth Rowell Thompson (1821–1899), American philanthropist
- E. S. L. Thompson (Elizabeth Shepherd Lamb Thompson, 1848–1944), American writer of prose and verse
- Libby Thompson (1855–1953), American prostitute and dancehall girl

== See also ==
- Elizabeth Thomson (disambiguation)
- Liz Thompson (disambiguation)
- Thompson (surname)
