= Aaron Thompson =

Aaron Thompson may refer to:

- Aaron Thompson (baseball) (born 1987), American former professional baseball pitcher
- Aaron Thompson (educator), American academic
- Aaron Thompson (musician) (fl. 1980s–2010s)
- Aaron Thompson (politician) (born 1991), American politician
- Aaron Thompson (translator) (1681/1682–1751), English clergyman
