= Adam Thompson =

Adam Thompson may refer to:

== The arts ==
- Adam David Thompson, American actor
- A. C. Thompson (born c. 1972), American investigative journalist
- Adam Thompson (fl. 2000s–2020s), guitarist and lead singer of the Scottish indie rock group We Were Promised Jetpacks
- Adam Thompson (fl. 1990s), former vocalist in the band Chocolate Starfish
- Adam Thompson (author), winner of The Story Prize Spotlight Award for his collection of short stories Born Into This (2021)

== Other people ==
- Adam Thompson (British politician) (born 1990), British member of parliament
- Adam Thompson (American politician), member-elect of the New Hampshire House of Representatives
- Adam Thompson (footballer) (born 1992), Northern Ireland footballer
- Adam Thompson (tennis) (born 1982), New Zealand tennis player

== See also ==
- Adam Thomson (disambiguation)
