= Kevin Thompson =

Kevin Thompson may refer to:

- Kevin Thompson (pastor) (born 1958), pastor from San Leandro, California convicted of shark smuggling
- Kevin Thompson (karate) (born 1962)
- Kevin Thompson (American football) (born 1977), former starting quarterback for Penn State Nittany Lions
- Kevin Thompson (basketball) (born 1971), American former basketball player
- Kevin Thompson (baseball) (born 1979), Major League Baseball player
- Kevin Thompson (philosopher), American professor of philosophy
- Kevin Thompson (politician), American politician
- Kevin Rolland Thompson (1954–2015), physicist

== Fictional characters ==
- Kevin Thompson (Daria), a fictional character on the MTV show Daria
- Kevin Thompson, the real name for Jessica Jones villain Purple Man in the TV series of the same name

== See also ==
- Kevin Thomson (born 1984), Scottish footballer
- Kevin Thomson (cricketer) (born 1971), Scottish cricketer
