= Kenneth Thomson (disambiguation) =

Kenneth Thomson, 2nd Baron Thomson of Fleet (1923–2006) was a Canadian billionaire businessman and art collector.

Ken or Kenneth Thomson may also refer to:

- Kenneth Thomson (cricketer) (born 1947), Australian cricketer
- Ken Thomson (footballer) (1930–1969), Scottish footballer (Aberdeen, Stoke City, Middlesbrough, Hartlepools United)
- Kenneth Thomson (actor) (1899–1967), American film actor born Charles Kenneth Thomson
- Kenny Thomson (born 1951), Scottish footballer (Dunfermline Athletic, St. Johnstone)
- Kenny Thomson (curler) (born 1969), New Zealand curling player

== See also ==
- Kenneth Thompson (disambiguation)
