= Alex Thomson =

Alex or Alec Thomson may refer to:

- Alex Thomson (cinematographer) (1929–2007), British cinematographer
- Alex Thomson (cricketer) (born 1993), English cricketer
- Alex Thomson (sailor) (born 1974), British yachtsman
- Alex Thomson (journalist) (born 1960), British television journalist and newscaster
- Alex Thomson (rugby union) (born 1921), Scotland international rugby union player
- Alec Thomson (1873–1953), Australian politician
- Alec Thomson (footballer) (1901–1975), Scottish footballer (Celtic FC, Dunfermline Athletic FC and Scotland)
- AP Thomson, American video game designer

== See also ==
- Alexander Thomson (disambiguation)
