= Ian Thomson =

Ian Thomson may refer to:

- Ian Thomson (colonial administrator) (1920–2008), British colonial administrator in Fiji and administrator of the British Virgin Islands
- Ian Thomson (cricketer) (1929–2021), English cricketer who played five Test matches
- Ian Thomson (Australian rules footballer) (born 1949), former VFL and WAFL player
- Ian Thomson (rugby league) (born 1956), Australian rugby league footballer and administrator
- Ian Thomson (rugby union) (1930–2014), Scottish rugby union player
- Ian Thomson (writer) (born 1961), English author
- Ian Thomson (umpire) (born 1963), Australian-born cricket umpire who represents Hong Kong
- Ian Thomson (cyclist), Scottish cyclist
- Ian Thomson (field hockey), English field hockey player

== See also ==
- Iain Thomson (born 1968), American philosopher
- Ian White-Thomson (1904–1997), Anglican clergyman
- Ian Comrie-Thomson, rugby union player who represented Australia
- Ian Thompson (disambiguation)
