= Craig Thomson =

Craig Thomson may refer to:

- Craig Thomson (politician) (born 1964), Australian politician
- Craig Thomson (footballer, born 1991), Scottish footballer
- Craig Thomson (footballer, born 1995), Scottish footballer
- Craig Thomson (referee) (born 1972), Scottish football referee

== See also ==
- Craig Thompson (disambiguation)
