= Craig Thompson (disambiguation) =

Craig Thompson (born 1975) is an American graphic novelist.

Craig Thompson may also refer to:

- Craig Thompson (soccer) (born 1986), American association football player
- Craig B. Thompson (born 1953), American cell biologist
- Craig Thompson (tight end) (born 1969), NFL player
- Craig Thompson (American football coach) (born c. 1965), American college football coach
- Craig Thompson (politician), American politician
- Craig Thompson (sports administrator) (born 1956), American athletic administrator
- Craig Thompson, Canadian Patient Ombudsman of Ontario

== See also ==
- Craig Thomson (disambiguation)
