= Anthony Thompson =

Anthony Thompson may refer to:

- Anthony Thompson (running back) (born April 8, 1967), former American football running back
- Anthony Thompson (linebacker) (born June 19, 1967), former American football linebacker
- Anthony Thompson (defensive back) (born 1990), Canadian football defensive back
- Anthony Thompson (boxer) (born 1981), American middleweight boxer
- Anthony Thompson (Gaelic footballer) (born 1986), Donegal player
- Anthony Thompson (basketball) (born 2008), American college basketball player
- Anthony Thompson (priest) (fl. 1744–1757), Anglican priest in Ireland
- Anthony Thompson (politician), MP for Cambridge
- Anthony Benedict Thompson, British singer
- Antony Worrall Thompson (born 1951), British chef
- Anthony Thompson, bassist in Channel 3

== See also ==
- Tony Thompson (disambiguation)
- Anthony Thomson (disambiguation)
