= Keith Thomson =

Keith Thomson may refer to:

- Keith Thomson (sportsman) (1941–2023), New Zealand cricketer and field hockey player
- Keith Stewart Thomson (born 1938), professor of natural history
- Keith Thomson (politician) (1919–1960), U.S. representative from Wyoming, 1955–1960

== See also ==
- Keith Thompson (disambiguation)
