= Martin Thomsen =

Martin Thomsen may refer to:

- Martin Thomsen (footballer, born 1980), Danish football defender
- Martin Thomsen (footballer, born 1982), Danish football midfielder
- Martin Thomsen (referee), referee in football competitions such as the Telekom Cup

== See also ==
- Martin Thompson (disambiguation)
