= Patrick Thompson (disambiguation) =

Patrick Thompson (born 1935) was a British Conservative Party politician. Patrick Thompson may also refer to:

- Patrick Thompson (artist) (fl. 2010s), Canadian artist
- Patrick Thompson (Irish republican), wrongfully convicted of the 1975 Forkhill beer keg bombing
- Patrick Daley Thompson (born 1969), alderman in Chicago

== See also ==
- Patrick Thomson, a department store in Edinburgh
