= Frances Thompson (disambiguation) =

Frances Thompson may refer to:

- Frances Thompson (died 1876), transgender former slave and anti-rape activist
- Frances Thompson, fictional character in 1993 TV drama Family of Strangers
- Frances Euphemia Thompson (1896–1992), African American artist and art educator
- Frances McBroom Thompson (1942–2014), American mathematician
- Mary Frances Thompson (1895–1995), better known as Te Ata, Native American storyteller and actress
- Frances Willson Thompson, namesake of a library at the University of Michigan–Flint

== See also ==
- Francis Thompson (disambiguation)
