= Chris Thompson =

Chris Thompson may refer to:

== Sportspeople ==
- Chris Thompson (swimmer) (born 1978), American Olympic swimmer
- Chris Thompson (runner) (born 1981), British athlete
- Chris Thompson (cornerback) (born 1982), American football player
- Chris Thompson (running back) (born 1990), American football player
- Chris Thompson (darts player) (born 1971), English darts player
- Chris Thompson (footballer, born 1960) (1960–2012), English footballer
- Chris Thompson (footballer, born 1982), English footballer
- Chris Thompson (cricketer) (born 1987), English cricketer
- Chris Thompson (wide receiver) (born 1994), American football player
- Chris Thompson (golfer) (born 1976), American golfer

== Others ==
- Chris Thompson (English musician) (born 1948), English singer and guitarist
- Chris Thompson (TV producer) (1952–2015), American director, producer, and writer
- Chris Thompson (Canadian musician) (born 1971), Canadian musician

== See also ==
- Christopher Thompson (disambiguation)
- Christian Thompson (disambiguation)
- Chris Thomsen (born 1968), American football coach
- Chris Thomson (born 1985), Australian rugby union footballer
- Christopher Thomson, 1st Baron Thomson (1875–1930), British Army officer and politician
