= Elizabeth Thomson =

Elizabeth Thomson may refer to:

- Elizabeth Thomson (artist) (born 1955)
- Elizabeth Thomson (linguist) (born 1961)
- Elizabeth Thomson (politician)
- Elizabeth Thomson (suffragist) (1847–1918)
- Elizabeth Mars Johnson Thomson (1807–1864), African-American missionary in Liberia

== See also ==
- Elizabeth Thompson (disambiguation)
