= Don Thompson =

Don or Donald Thompson or Thomson may refer to:

== Entertainment ==
- Don Thompson (musician) (born 1940), Canadian jazz musician
- Don Thompson (producer, playwright) (born 1956), American producer, playwright and filmmaker
- Don Thompson (writer) (1935–1994), American comic book historian
- Donald W. Thompson (1937–2019), American filmmaker, producer and screenwriter

== Sports ==
- Don Thompson (offensive lineman) (1902–1968), American player
- Don Thompson (defensive end) (born 1939), American football player
- Don Thompson (baseball) (1923–2009), American player
- Don Thompson (racewalker) (1933–2006), British Olympic race walker
- Don Thomson (born 1941), American barefoot water skiing pioneer
- Don Thomson Jr. (born 1962), Canadian racing car driver
- Donald Thompson (fencer) (1928–2013), American Olympic fencer
- Don Thompson (Australian footballer) (born 1937), Australian rules footballer
- Don Thompson (ice hockey) (born 1949), Canadian ice hockey forward

== Others ==
- Don Thompson (executive) (born 1963), CEO at McDonald's
- Donald Thomson (1901–1970), Australian anthropologist and ornithologist
- Donald Thompson (British politician) (1931–2005), English Conservative Party politician
- Donald C. Thompson (admiral) (1930–2022), United States Coast Guard admiral
- Donald C. Thompson (photographer) (1884–1947), American war photographer
- Donald Thompson (Oklahoma politician), American politician

== Other uses ==
- Don Thompson Award, given for achievement in comic books, comic strips, and animation

== See also ==
- Thompson Donald (1876–1957), Northern Irish politician
