= Tumasyan =

Tumasyan (Armenian: Թումասյան) is an Armenian surname. The name is patronymic, derived from the Armenian equivalent of Thomas, making the name equivalent to Thompson. Notable people with the surname include:

- Aleksandr Sergeyevich Tumasyan (born 1955), Russian football coach
- Aleksandr Aleksandrovich Tumasyan (born 1992), Armenian football player
- Denis Tumasyan (born 1985), Russian footballer
- Sergei Tumasyan (born 1990), Russian footballer
- Nara Tumasyan, Armenian actress, TV presenter
