= Christian Thomsen =

Christian Thomsen may refer to:

- Christian Braad Thomsen (1940–2025), Danish film director and author
- Christian Jürgensen Thomsen (1788–1865), Danish antiquarian
- Christian Thomsen (sculptor) (1860–1921), Danish sculptor
- Christian Lind Thomsen (born 1985), Danish badminton player

== See also ==
- Christian Thompson (disambiguation)
