= Cecil Thompson =

Cecil Thompson may refer to:

- Tiny Thompson (Cecil Ralph Thompson, 1903–1981), Canadian professional ice hockey goaltender
- Cecil Thompson (cricketer) (1890–1963), Australian cricketer
- Cecil Thompson (RAF officer) (1894–1973), South African World War I flying ace
- C. V. R. Thompson (Cecil Victor Raymond Thompson, 1906-1951), UK journalist and author
- Cec Thompson (1926–2011), English rugby league player
