= Albert Thompson (footballer, born 1885) =

English footballer

Personal information
- Full name: Albert John Thompson
- Date of birth: 1885
- Place of birth: Louth, England
- Date of death: 14 June 1956 (aged 70–71)
- Position: Outside left

Senior career*
Years	Team	Apps	(Gls)
1903–1904	Grimsby Rovers		
1904–1905	Grimsby Town	2	(0)
1905–1906	Grimsby Rovers		
1906–1907	Grimsby St John's		
1907–19??	Grimsby Rovers		
- * Club domestic league appearances and goals

Albert John Thompson (1885 – 14 June 1956) was an English amateur footballer who played as an outside left in the Football League for Grimsby Town.

== Personal life ==
Thompson's younger brother Ralph also played for Grimsby Town and was killed on the first day on the Somme. His father John was a builder and chairman of Grimsby Town in 1905 and 1906. Thompson served in the Royal Navy during the First World War and later rose to become a director of the Ross Group. For approximately forty years after retiring from football, Thompson wrote football stories for the Grimsby News under a pen name.
