= Frederick Thomson =

Frederick Thomson may refer to:

- Sir Frederick Thomson, 1st Baronet (1875–1935), Scottish jurist and politician
- Fred Thomson (1890–1928), American actor
- Frederick Whitley-Thomson (1851–1925), British politician
- Frederick A. Thomson (1869–1925), director of silent films

== See also ==
- Frederick Thompson (disambiguation)
