= Tomašević =

Tomašević (pronounced [tomǎːʃevitɕ]; Cyrillic: Toмaшeвић), also Tomasevich, is a South Slavic patronymic surname, equivalent to Thomson or Thompson. Notable people with the surname include:

- Aleksandar Tomašević (1908–1988), Serbian Yugoslav international football player and manager
- Anđelka Tomašević (born 1993), Serbian model
- Bojan Tomašević (born 2001), Montenegrin basketball player
- Dejan Tomašević (born 1973), Serbian professional basketball player
- Dragana Tomašević (born 1982), Serbian discus thrower
- Dragutin Tomašević (1890–1915), track and field athlete and gymnast from the Kingdom of Serbia
- Goran Tomasevic (born 1969), international war photographer
- Guillermo Tomasevich (born 1987), Peruvian footballer
- Ivan Tomašević (soldier), Croatian soldier and an NDH general
- Ivan Tomašević (activist), Croatian labourer and political activist in New Zealand
- Jelena Tomašević (born 1983), Serbian pop singer
- Josip Tomašević (footballer, born 1993), Croatian footballer
- Josip Tomašević (footballer, born 1994), Croatian footballer
- Josip Jozo Tomašević (1908–1994), American economist and historian
- Katarina Tomašević (born 1984), Serbian female handball player
- Kosta Tomašević (1923–1976), Yugoslavian (Serbian) football player
- Petar Tomašević (born 1989), French water polo player of Montenegrin origin
- Sanja Tomašević (born 1980), Serbian American volleyball player and coach
- Sigismund Tomašević (fl. 15th century), birth name of a Bosnian prince who became Ishak Bey Kraloğlu, Ottoman sanjak-bey
- Stana Tomašević (1920–1983), Montenegrin Yugoslav Partisan, model, politician and diplomat
- Stephen Tomašević of Bosnia, ruled from 1461 to 1463 as the last King of Bosnia
- Tanja Tomašević Damnjanović (born 1982), Serbian politician
- Tomislav Tomašević (born 1983), Croatian activist and politician
- Vincent Tomasevich Thomas (1907–1980), Croatian American politician
- Vuko Tomasevic (born 1980), Australian football (soccer) player of Serbian descent
- Žarko Tomašević (born 1990), Montenegrin footballer

== See also ==
- Tomasevich Pegasus or Tomashevich Pegasus, World War II Soviet ground attack prototype aircraft
