= B. J. Thompson =

B. J. Thompson may refer to:

- Browder J. Thompson (1903–1944), American electrical engineer
- B. J. Thompson (American football) (born 1999), American football player

== See also ==
- Thompson (surname)
