= Anthony Thomson =

Anthony Thomson may refer to:

- Anthony Thomson, founder of Metro Bank (UK)
- Anthony Todd Thomson (1778–1849), Scottish dermatologist

== See also ==
- Anthony Thompson (disambiguation)
