= Samuel Thompson =

Samuel or Sam Thompson, Thomson or Thomsen may refer to:

== Sports ==
- Sam Thompson (outfielder) (1860–1922), American baseball player
- Sammy Thomson (1862–1943), Scottish footballer
- Samuel Huston Thompson (1875–1966), American football player
- Sam Thompson (catcher) (1885–?), American Negro league baseball player
- Samuel Thomson (decathlete), winner of the all-around at the 1921 USA Outdoor Track and Field Championships
- Sam Thompson (pitcher) (1908–1978), American Negro league baseball player
- Sam Thomson (sportsman, born 1911) (1911–1995), Scottish football and cricket player
- Samuel Thompson, Ghanaian footballer in the 2001 FIFA World Youth Championship squads
- Sam Thompson (rugby league) (born 1986), English rugby league footballer
- Sam Thompson (basketball) (born 1992), American basketball player
- Sam Thompson (tennis) (born 1993), Australian tennis player
- Sam Thomson (rugby union) (born 1994), Scottish rugby union player

== Politics ==
- Samuel S. Thompson, member of the Los Angeles County Board of Supervisors, 1854
- Samuel Benjamin Thompson (1837–1909), politician in South Carolina
- Samuel Thompson (Canadian politician) (1845–1909), veterinarian and politician in Manitoba, Canada
- Samuel B. Thomsen (born 1931), American diplomat
- Samuel D. Thompson (born 1935), member of the New Jersey Senate

== Other ==
- Samuel Thompson (herald) (died 1624), English herald
- Samuel Thompson (1735–1798), American Revolutionary War soldier after whom Thompson's War is named
- Samuel Thomson (1769–1843), American practitioner of alternative medicine
- Samuel Thompson (newspaper editor) (1810–1886), Canadian businessman and newspaper editor
- Samuel Eaton Thompson (c. 1875–c. 1960), American contactee who claimed to have been in contact with extraterrestrials
- Samuel Frederick Henry Thompson (1890–1918), British World War I flying ace
- Samuel Martin Thompson (1901–1983), American philosopher
- Sam Thompson (playwright) (1916–1965), Irish playwright
- Samuel James Thomson (1922–2006), Scottish chemist
- Sam Thompson, plaintiff in the 1960 U.S. Supreme court case of Thompson v. City of Louisville
- Sammy Thompson (1932/33–1988), British trade union leader
- Sam Thompson (writer) (born 1978), British novelist
- Sam Thompson (TV personality) (born 1992), English television personality
- Sam Thomson, musician with the New Zealand band Drax Project
