= Francis Thomson =

Francis Thomson may refer to:

- Francis Thomson (bishop) (1917–1987), Scottish Roman Catholic clergyman
- Sir Francis Vernon Thomson, 1st Baronet (1881–1953), British businessman

== See also ==
- Francis Thompson (disambiguation)
- Frank Thomson (disambiguation)
