= Aaron Thompson (translator) =

English clergyman and translator

Aaron Thompson (1681 or 1682 – 27 July 1751) was an English clergyman from a Cumberland family who served as vicar of Broad Chalke in Wiltshire from 1724 until his death. He is best known for his only book, The British History, Translated into English from the Latin of Jeffrey of Monmouth. With a Large Preface concerning the Authority of the History (1718). This was the first, and for the better part of 200 years only, translation of Geoffrey of Monmouth's Historia Regum Britanniae.

== Parentage ==
Aaron Thompson was apparently born in 1681 or 1682, the youngest son of George Thompson, owner of the estate of Farmanby, north east of Penrith in Cumberland. George Thompson came from a Cavalier and therefore presumably Church of England family, but his wife Jane, daughter of William Jameson of Parkhead, Kirkoswald, from a Presbyterian one; both were excommunicated for recusancy in 1666, though George seems to have later returned to the Church of England.

== Education and career in the Church ==
George Thompson died while Aaron was still a child, leaving him £100 in his will, but when Aaron entered Queen's College, Oxford on 27 January 1700 and matriculated on 2 July 1700 he was entered in the university records as a pauper puer, "poor boy". In 1705 he gained his Bachelor of Arts degree, and that seems to have marked the end of his education. He found a patron in Richard Boyle, Earl of Burlington, who made him a domestic chaplain. In 1724 he was made vicar of All Saints Church, Broad Chalke, Wiltshire, and he retained that office until his death on 27 July 1751. He was buried at Broad Chalke on 1 August. A one-paragraph obituary of him published by The London Evening-Post, a Tory and High Church newspaper, described him as "a sound and universal Scholar, of the strictest Piety, and firmest Integrity", and deplored the machinations of "corrupt Party and sordid Interest" in depriving him of the Church preferment he deserved.

== Personal life ==
Thompson married twice and had at least four children. By his first wife, whose name is not known, he had a daughter named Tabitha. On 5 December 1734 he married his second wife, Jane Ryman, in St Mary's Church, Litton Cheney, Dorset. By her he was father of Daniel, Jane and Henry.

== The British History ==
Thompson is chiefly remembered for having published in 1718 the first translation into Modern English of the 12th-century pseudohistorian Geoffrey of Monmouth's Historia Regum Britanniae, impelled thereto, he said, by the requests of various of his friends. Though Thompson claimed in his preface to have consulted several manuscripts of the Historia and the 1517 edition by Josse Bade, his was essentially a translation of the highly inaccurate 1587 edition by Jerome Commelin. It included, as his title-page said, "a large Preface concerning the Authority of the History", and also an appendix explaining the work's place-names. It was, in the judgement of Lewis Thorpe, by far the most sound of the Historia's translations until the 20th century. Though Thompson translated all of Geoffrey's prose himself, for the short poem in Book I in which Brutus of Troy addresses the goddess Diana he turned to his London neighbour Alexander Pope, who obliged with an eight-line version, "Goddess of Woods, tremendous in the Chace". It has been suggested that Pope also gave him the translation of Diana's verse reply, "Brutus there lies beyond the Gallick Bounds", though this is pure speculation.

In his preface Thompson argues that the Historia was indeed, just as Geoffrey claimed it to be, a Latin translation from an ancient British book rather than an original composition, and that it was a credible historical source. He focussed especially on the essential truth of its account of the founding of the British nation by the Trojan refugee Brutus and his followers. This defence of the Historia, which seems to have been motivated by his patriotic feelings, is based on Robert Sheringham's ingenious but naive treatise De Anglorum Gentis Origine Disceptatio (1670), and gives little evidence of historical erudition on Thompson's own part. It ignores the scholarship of his own day, which had disproved many of the arguments he used, and which had established that Geoffrey's work was of little use to the historian. The antiquary Thomas Hearne (1678–1735) was consequently to dismiss Thompson as "but a Dabbler".

By 1782 Thompson's British History was described as "not commonly to be met with", but in 1842 a new edition by J. A. Giles appeared which claimed that "the translation of Thompson has been followed, revised and corrected wherever the phraseology appeared to be unsuited to the more accurate ears of today". In fact, Thompson's text was left largely untouched. Not until 1896, almost two centuries after Thompson's British History, did an entirely new translation of the Historia appear, by Sebastian Evans. During this period the influence Thompson's work exercised on male writers was limited. However, an unusually large number of the subscribers to the 1718 British History were women, whose education was unlikely to have equipped them to read Latin, and it has been argued that his translation exercised a large influence on female writers' understanding of the Arthurian legend for the next century and more, from Clara Reeve to Caroline Norton.
