= Edward Thompson =

Edward Thompson or variants may refer to:

== Politicians ==
- Edward Thompson (of Sheriff Hutton) (c. 1639–1701), English landowner and politician
- Edward Thompson (1697–1742), British MP and Lord of the Admiralty
- Edward Thompson (FDNY Commissioner) (1913–1995), American firefighter, fire commissioner of New York City
- Edward Charles Thompson (1851–1933), member of parliament for North Monaghan, 1900–1906
- Edward Herbert Thompson (1857–1935), US diplomat and archaeologist
- Ed Thompson (Texas politician) (born 1950), American politician
- Ed Thompson (Wisconsin politician) (1944–2011), American businessman and politician
- J. Ed Thompson (1886–1976), American politician in Arkansas

== Sports ==
- Edward Thompson (footballer) (1894–1918), English footballer
- Eddie Thompson (businessman) (1940–2008), Scottish businessman and football club chairman
- Eddie Thompson (Canadian football) (1917–1943), Canadian football player and WW2 airman
- Eddie Thompson (cricketer) (1907–1982), English cricketer
- Eddie Thompson (rugby union) (1906–?), Australian rugby union player
- Ed Thompson (footballer) (born 1983), English football goalkeeper

== Writers ==
- Edward Healy Thompson (1813–1891), English Roman Catholic writer
- Edward John Thompson (1886–1946), British scholar, novelist, historian and translator
- Edward Roffe Thompson (1891–1973), English author and journalist
- Edward Kramer Thompson (1907–1996), American writer and editor
- E. P. Thompson (1924–1993), British historian, socialist, author and peace campaigner

== Other people ==
- Edward Thompson (actor) (1898–1960), American film actor
- Edward Maunde Thompson (1840–1929), British palaeographer
- Edward Thompson (engineer) (1881–1954), British railway engineer
- Edward Thompson (Royal Navy officer) (1738–1786), English commodore nicknamed "Poet Thompson" for his writings
- Eddie Thompson (musician) (1925–1986), English jazz pianist
- E. A. Thompson (Edward Arthur Thompson, 1914–1994), British historian

== See also ==
- Ted Thompson (1953–2021), American football player and executive
- Teddy Thompson (born 1976), English folk and rock musician
- Edward Thompson Hoke Wang, actually Naga Thein Hlaing (1933–2021), Burmese surgeon
- Edward Thomson (disambiguation)
