= Jenny Thompson (disambiguation) =

Jenny Thompson (born 1973) is an American swimmer.

Jenny Thompson may also refer to:

- Jenny Thompson (runner) (1910–1976), Canadian runner

== See also ==
- Jennifer Thompson (disambiguation)
