= Liz Thompson =

Liz Thompson may refer to:

- Liz Thompson (politician) (born 1961), Barbadian politician and diplomat
- Liz Thompson, character in Soul Eater
- Liz Thompson, character in Baby Love (film)

== See also ==
- Elizabeth Thompson (disambiguation)
