= Mark Thompson =

Mark Thompson may refer to:

== Sports ==
- Mark Thompson (American football) (born 1994), American football player
- Mark Thompson (baseball) (born 1971), baseball player
- Mark Thompson (footballer) (born 1963), former Australian rules football premiership captain and coach
- Mark Scott Thompson, manager of the El Salvador national football team
- Mark Thompson (hurdler) (born 1967), Jamaican Olympic hurdler
- Mark Thompson (racing driver) (born 1951), American stock car racing driver, pilot, and businessman

== Politics ==
- Mark Thompson (Minnesota politician) (born 1960), American politician
- Mark Thompson (Arizona politician), Arizona politician
- Mark Thompson (Iowa politician) (born 1955), American politician in Iowa
- Mark R. Thompson (born 1960), expert on Southeast Asian politics

== Others ==
- Mark Thompson (DJ) (born 1955), American radio personality, best known as half of Mark & Brian
- Mark Thompson (reporter) (born c. 1953), 1985 Pulitzer Prize–winning reporter
- Mark Thompson (author) (1952–2016), American writer on LGBT themes and advocacy
- Mark Thompson (media executive) (born 1957), Ancestry board chair, CEO of CNN; former NY Times CEO, BBC Dir. Gen.
- Mark Thompson (newscaster), American television newscaster/announcer
- Mark Thompson (historian) (born 1959), British historian
- Mark Thompson (astronomer) (born 1973), British astronomer
- Mark Thompson (painter) (1812–1875), British painter
- Mark Thompson (chemist), Californian chemistry academic
- Mark Christian Thompson (born 1970), professor of English

== See also ==
- Marc Thompson (disambiguation)
- Mark Thomson (disambiguation)
