= Stanley Thompson (disambiguation) =

Stanley Thompson (1893–1953) was a Canadian golf course architect.

Stanley or Stan Thompson may also refer to:

- Stanley Gerald Thompson (1912–1976), American nuclear chemist
- Stan Thompson (1908–1980), English footballer
- Stan Thompson (Family Guy), character in animated sitcom Family Guy
