= Frances McBroom Thompson =

American mathematics educator and textbook author

Frances Ann McBroom Thompson (October 25, 1942 – April 23, 2014) was an American mathematics educator and textbook author who became a professor at Texas Woman's University.

== Life ==
Thompson was born in Brownwood, Texas, on October 25, 1942; her parents were Alexander Moreland McBroom and Myrtle Marie Huff McBroom. She was a student at Brownwood High School, and graduated cum laude after three years of study from Abilene Christian University, in 1963. She earned a master's degree in mathematics at the University of Texas at Austin in 1967, and completed a doctorate in mathematics education at the University of Georgia in 1973.

She taught mathematics at the junior high and high school level, and joined the faculty at Texas Woman's University circa 1983, retiring as a full professor there in 2009. She worked on statewide programs to improve teacher education in Texas, and served as an evaluator for the National Council of Teachers of Mathematics. As well as teaching mathematics, she was a frequent teacher of Bible school classes through her church.

She died of cancer on April 23, 2014.

== Books ==
Thompson was the author of multiple books on both mathematics and Bible study, including:

- Five-Minute Challenges for Secondary School (Activity Resources, 1988)
- More Five-Minute Challenges for Secondary School (Activity Resources, 1992)
- Hands-On Algebra! Ready-to-Use Games and Activities for Grades 7—12 (Prentice-Hall, 1998)
- Ready-to-Use Math Proficiency Lessons & Activities (Wiley, 2003)
- Math Essentials: Lessons and Activities for Test Preparation (Wiley, 2005)

== Recognition ==
Abilene Christian University named Thompson a distinguished alumna in 1998, and gave her their Grover C. Morland Award for Outstanding Teaching. Texas Woman's University gave her their Distinguished Service Award and their Mary Mason Lyon Award for Excellence in Teaching, Research and Service.
