= Lowland Scots =

Lowland Scots can refer to:

- people of Lowland Scotland
- Scots language
