= Rocky Thompson (disambiguation) =

Rocky Thompson is the name of:

- Rocky Thompson (born 1977), Canadian ice hockey defenseman
- Rocky Thompson (golfer) (1939–2021), American golfer
- Rocky Thompson (American football) (born 1947), Bermudian player for NFL's New York Giants
