= Frank Thompson (disambiguation) =

Frank Thompson (1918–1989) was an American politician.

Frank Thompson may also refer to:

== Sports ==
=== Baseball ===
- Frank Thompson (catcher) (1852–1925), Portuguese baseball player in the United States; born Augustus Fernandez
- Frank Thompson (third baseman) (1895–1940), American baseball player
- Frank Thompson (pitcher) (1918–1983), American baseball player

=== Other sports ===
- Frank Thompson (footballer) (1885–1950), Irish football player and manager
- Frank Thompson (coach) (1886–1918), American gridiron football and baseball player and coach
- Frank Thompson (sport shooter) (born 1988), American Olympian in skeet shooting

== Military ==
- Sarah Emma Edmonds (1841–1898), Canadian-American woman who served with the Union Army as Frank Thompson during the American Civil War
- Frank Thompson (SOE officer) (1920–1944), British officer during World War II
- Frank Tsosie Thompson (1920–2008), American Navajo code talker during World War II

== Other ==
- Frank V. Thompson (1874–1921), American educator
- Frank D. Thompson (1876–1940), Justice of the Vermont Supreme Court
- Francis Roy Thompson (1896–1966), Australian artist whose work was first exhibited at the New Gallery of Fine Art in Adelaide, also known as Frank Roy or F. R. Thompson
- Frank Thompson (designer) (1920–1977), American costume designer

== See also ==
- Francis Thompson (disambiguation)
- Frank Thomson (disambiguation)
