= Laura Thompson =

Laura Thompson may refer to:

- Laura Thompson (cyclist) (born 1987), New Zealand cyclist and former basketball player
- Laura Thompson (politician), former independent member of the Texas House of Representatives
- Laura Maud Thompson (1905–2000), American anthropologist
- Laura Thompson (British author), writer and biographer
