= Adam Thomson =

Adam Thomson may refer to:

== Sport ==
- Adam Thomson (Australian footballer) (born 1986), former Australian rules footballer
- Adam Thomson (rugby union) (born 1982), New Zealand rugby union footballer

== Other people ==
- Sir Adam Thomson (1926–2000), British businessman, founder of Caledonian Airways
- Sir Adam Thomson (diplomat) (born 1955), British diplomat, former Permanent Representative to NATO
- Adam Bruce Thomson (1885–1976), Scottish artist
- Adam S. T. Thomson (1908–2000), Scottish engineer and university administrator

== See also ==
- Adam Thompson (disambiguation)
