= Christian Thompson =

Christian Thompson may refer to:

- Christian Thompson (born 1978), Australian artist
- Christian Thompson (born 1990), American football player
- Christian Thompson, character in the 2006 film The Devil Wears Prada
- Christian Thompson, lead guitarist of Falling in Reverse

== See also ==
- Christian Thomsen (disambiguation)
- Chris Thompson (disambiguation)
