= Rachel Thompson =

Rachel Thompson may refer to:

- Rachel Ford Thompson (1856–1906), British botanist
- Rachel Thompson (runner), a runner for Sierra Leone at the 1988 Summer Olympics
- Rachel Thompson, fictional character in Cuckoo (TV series)
- Rachel Thompson, fictional character in Beautiful Dreamer (2006 film)

== See also ==
- Rachel Thomson, professor at Loughborough University
