= Mark Thompson (painter) =

English painter

Mark Thompson (1812–1875) was an English painter of the Victorian era. He painted many scenes from life in and around Sunderland in the north of England. His paintings of local landmarks such as local castles and dockland scenes are now highly prized and several have been secured for local public galleries.

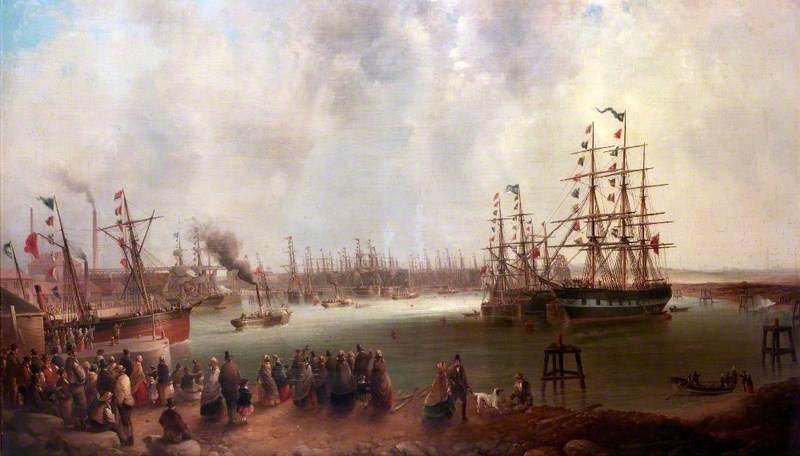
The opening of Tyne Dock (Mark Thompson, 1850)

Mark Thompson was born on Wearside in 1812. He was a keen amateur painter as a young man, while working in Sunderland as a general agent. He is believed to have taken instruction from several of the resident artists there. He did not become a professional artist until his late forties, becoming well known as painter of local scenes. Sunderland Museum and Winter Gardens was the first local authority museum outside London to be established following the Museums Act 1846. Its first recorded fine art acquisition was a commission by the Sunderland to Mark Thompson, who was paid 30 guineas to record the opening of the new South Dock in 1850. This may be the first occasion in which a town council anywhere in the United Kingdom commissioned a painting.

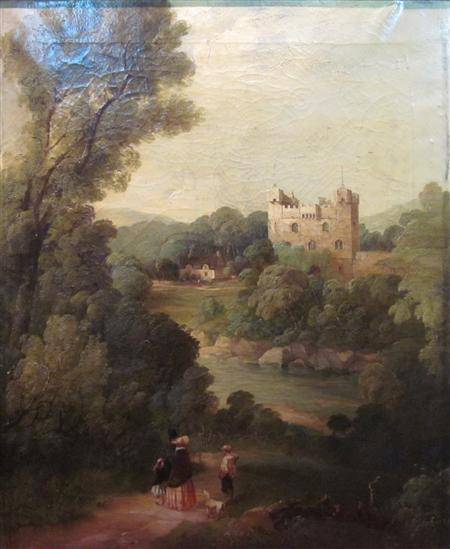
Hylton Castle Sunderland

Thompson moved to nearby Bishopswearmouth where he lived until his death in 1875. Most of Thompson's work arose from commissions from the local landed gentry for whom he executed many fine landscapes and topographical views, often recording the fine period country houses of the area for their owners. Thompson's work was highly prized by his patrons, largely because his style is similar to that of Thomas Sidney Cooper the famous painter of pastoral landscapes. Art critic Nigel Rhodes described Thompson as using "gentle, earth-toned palettes, with a natural sense of composition and a light, skilful technique." Thompson exhibited his first works in London through the British Institution in 1865 and 1866, with pastoral landscapes, "The Trees above' Middleton" and "Sheep Walk, Cronkley Craggs, Teesdale".
