= Jerry Thompson =

Jerry Thompson may refer to:

- Jerry Thompson (athlete) (1923–2021), American long-distance runner
- Jerry D. Thompson (born 1942), professor of history
- Jerry Thompson (American football) (1923–2010), American football and baseball player and coach

== See also ==
- Jeri Kehn Thompson, American radio talk show host
