= Martin Thompson =

Martin Thompson may refer to:

- Martin E. Thompson (1786–1877), American architect and artist
- Martín Jacobo Thompson (1777–1819), Argentine patriot
- Martin Luther Thompson (1857–1946), Texas Choctaw leader and rancher
- Martin Thompson (New Zealand artist) (1955–2021), New Zealand geometric abstract artist

== See also ==
- Martin Thomsen (disambiguation)
