= Jason Thompson =

Jason Thompson may refer to:

- Jason Thompson (actor) (born 1976), Canadian actor in General Hospital
- Jason Thompson (first baseman, born 1954), former Major League Baseball first baseman
- Jason Thompson (first baseman, born 1971), former Major League Baseball first baseman
- Jason Thompson (basketball) (born 1986), American professional basketball player
- Jason Thompson (figure skater) (born 1989), British figure skater
- Jason Thompson (soccer) (born 1981), American soccer player
- Jason Thompson (writer) (born 1974), American comics writer
- Jason Thompson (politician), American politician

== See also ==
- Jason Thomson (born 1987), Scottish footballer
