= Francis Longstreth Thompson =

British town planner and writer

Francis Longstreth Thompson, OBE (3 May 1890 – 19 March 1973) was a British town planner and writer.

He was born in Croydon, Surrey, and studied at University College, London, where he took a degree in engineering. In 1917 he published The Town Plan and the House, co-authored with Ernest G. Allen, showing the connection between housing design and site development. In 1923 he wrote Site Planning In Practice: an investigation of the principles of housing estate development, which laid down many of the principles adopted in identifying and developing suitable sites for housing. He worked with Thomas Adams on plans for the development of West Middlesex, co-authoring with Adams The West Middlesex Final Report in 1925. He set up his own town planning consultancy, and was President of the Town Planning Institute in 1932-33.

He died at Walmer, Kent, in 1973, aged 82. His son was the historian Francis Michael Longstreth Thompson.
