= Carl Thompson =

Carl Thompson may refer to:

- Carl Thompson (boxer) (born 1964), British boxer
- Carl Thompson (luthier) (born 1939), American luthier
- Carl Thompson (obese man) (1981–2015), heaviest man in the United Kingdom
- Carl D. Thompson (1870–1949), American clergyman and politician from the Midwest
- Carl W. Thompson (1914–2002), American politician from Wisconsin
- Carl V. Thompson, American engineer

== See also ==
- Karl R. Thompson (born c. 1970), American constitutional lawyer
- Carl Gustaf Thomson (1824–1899), Swedish entomologist
