= Craig Thompson (American football coach) =

American football coach (born c. 1965)

Current position
- Title: Assistant head coach & tight ends coach
- Team: Shasta
- Conference: NCL

Biographical details
- Born: c. 1965 (age 60–61)
- Education: Shasta College (1985); Humboldt State University (1988, 2000)

Playing career
- 1983–1984: Shasta
- 1985–1987: Humboldt State
- Position: Linebacker

Coaching career (HC unless noted)
- 1988: Eureka HS (CA) (LB)
- 1989–1990: Humboldt State (GA)
- 1991–1992: Shasta (LB)
- 1993–1995: Shasta (DC/LB)
- 1996: Shasta (interim HC/DC)
- 1997–2018: Shasta
- 2019–present: Shasta (AHC/TE)

Head coaching record
- Overall: 113–126
- Bowls: 3–6

Accomplishments and honors

Championships
- 2 BVC (2008, 2013); 3 AP7C / AP7L (2015–2017)

Craig Thompson (born c. 1965) is an American college football coach. He is the assistant head coach and tight ends coach for Shasta College, a position he has held since 2019. He was the head football coach for Shasta College from 1996 to 2018. Thompson also coached for Eureka High School and Humboldt State. He played college football for Shasta and Humboldt State as a linebacker.

== Head coaching record ==
Year	Team	Overall	Conference	Standing	Bowl/playoffs	CCCAA^{#}
Shasta Knights (NorCal Conference) (1996–2001)
1996	Shasta	6–4	4–3	T–3rd (Golden)		12 (Northern)
1997	Shasta	5–6	3–5	T–4th	L Holiday Inn Bowl	
1998	Shasta	8–3	3–2	2nd	L Pacific Graffiti Bowl	
1999	Shasta	5–5	1–4	T–5th		
2000	Shasta	6–5	2–3	T–3rd	L Silicon Valley Bowl	8 (Northern)
2001	Shasta	4–6	1–3	T–3rd		
Shasta Knights (Mid-Empire Conference) (2002–2007)
2002	Shasta	5–6	2–3	T–3rd	L Pacific Graffiti Bowl	
2003	Shasta	4–6	1–4	T–4th		20 (Northern)
2004	Shasta	4–6	2–3	T–3rd		
2005	Shasta	2–8	1–4	5th		
2006	Shasta	1–9	0–5	6th		
2007	Shasta	1–9	0–5	6th		
Shasta Knights (Bay Valley Conference) (2008–2013)
2008	Shasta	9–2	5–0	1st	W Bulldog Bowl	
2009	Shasta	4–6	2–2	3rd		
2010	Shasta	2–8	2–2	T–2nd		
2011	Shasta	2–8	1–3	4th		
2012	Shasta	3–7	1–4	5th		
2013	Shasta	6–4	4–1	T–1st		
Shasta Knights (American Pacific 7 Conference / League) (2014–2017)
2014	Shasta	8–3	5–1	2nd	L North State Bowl	
2015	Shasta	9–2	5–1	T–1st	W American Division Championship Bowl	
2016	Shasta	10–1	6–0	1st	L American Division Championship Bowl	
2017	Shasta	7–3	4–1	1st	W American Division Championship Bowl	25
Shasta Knights (National Norcal League) (2018)
2018	Shasta	2–8	1–4	5th		
Shasta:		113–126	56–63			
Total:		113–126				
National championship Conference title Conference division title or championship game berth
