= Hugh Thompson (Royal Navy officer) =

British naval officer

Vice-Admiral Sir Hugh Thompson KBE FIMechE FREng
- Born: 2 April 1931; Belfast
- Died: 11 December 1996 (Age 65); Bath
- Military career
- Allegiance: United Kingdom
- Branch: Royal Navy
- Service years: 43
- Rank: Vice-Admiral
- Awards: KBE

Vice-Admiral Sir Hugh Leslie Owen Thompson KBE FIMechE FREng (2 April 1931 - 11 December 1996) was a Royal Navy officer who served from 1946 to 1990. He acted as Chief Naval Engineering Officer from 1987-1989 and had the rare distinction of joining as an Artificer Apprentice and leaving as the head of his branch.

== Early life ==
Hugh Leslie Owen Thompson was born in Belfast, the son of Hugh Thompson, a shipwright with Harland & Wolff and Elsie Thompson (née Owen) a corsetiere. His grandfather was another Hugh Thompson who had also served in the Royal Navy as both a gunnery rating and officer.

Hugh Leslie Owen Thompson was educated at the Royal Belfast Academical Institution and left to join the Royal Navy at 15½ years old.

== Naval career ==
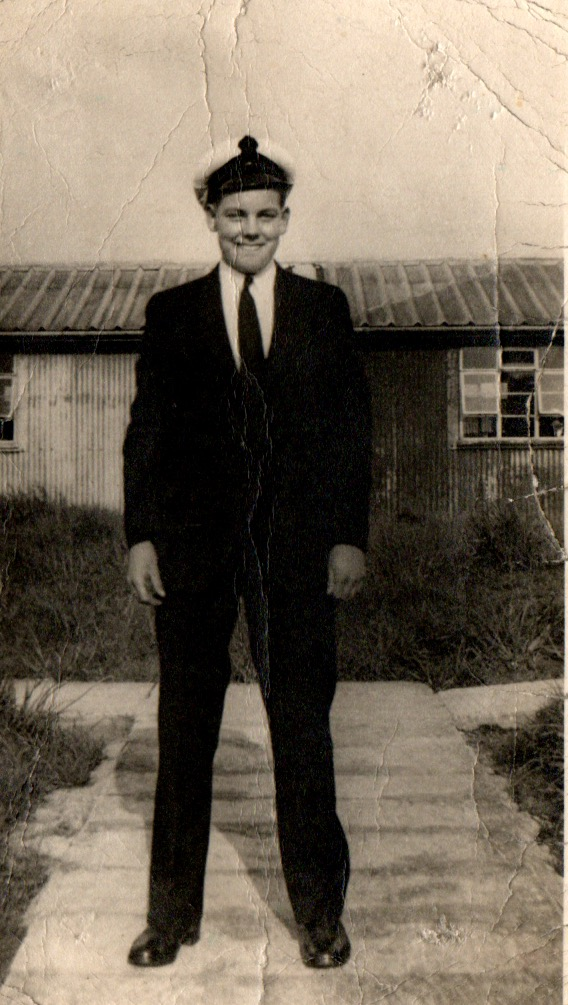
As a young artificer serving in HMS Caledonia 1947

He began his career at the apprentice training establishment, HMS Caledonia and was subsequently selected for a commission and trained at Britannia Royal Naval College and the Royal Naval Engineering College in Manadon and Keyham. In 1951 he was awarded the King’s Sword as the most outstanding student of his year. He gained seagoing experience in HMS Cumberland and during the 1950s served in various ships in the Mediterranean and Home fleets including HM Ships, Manxman, Bermuda and Duchess.

As part of the Royal Navy’s adoption of nuclear propulsion for its submarines, he was amongst the early cadre of mechanical engineers who sub-specialised as nuclear engineers. He undertook nuclear training at the Royal Naval College, Greenwich in 1959 and subsequently joined the Dreadnought Project Team at Foxhill - the Admiralty's technical centre in Bath.

His next appointment was to HMS Arethusa, a Leander-class frigate. He joined the ship as it was being built at J. Samuel White in Cowes and then served as its Marine Engineering Officer (MEO) during her first commission. After a brief return to Foxhill, he took up his final seagoing appointment as Commander (Engineering) of the heavy repair ship HMS Triumph based in Singapore.

On return to the UK, he was based again in Bath and throughout the 70s focused on the design and build of the Royal Navy’s cold war submarine flotilla including the Swiftsure, Trafalgar and Vanguard class submarines. He was also deeply involved in the revolution within surface ship propulsion that saw steam replaced by a combination of gas turbines and diesel-electric as seen in the Type 23 frigates.

He attended the Royal College of Defence Studies in 1980 and was promoted to rear admiral in 1983. He was further promoted to vice-admiral in 1986 and made a Knight Commander of the Most Excellent Order of the British Empire (KBE) in 1987. His final appointment was as Deputy Controller of the Navy and Chief Naval Engineer Officer. He retired in 1990.

As his obituarist said: "Always at heart the classic "steam plumber" of yore - recognised by white overalls, electric torch and wheel spanner - Hugh Thompson's strengths lay in a universal technical knowledge coupled to a calm, humane management style."

== Personal life and retirement ==
In 1957 Thompson married Sheila Finch, a Queen Alexandra Royal Naval Nurse (QARNN) daughter of Albert, a Royal Navy engineer and Nora Finch, a nurse. They had three children. Sheila died in 1974 and he married his second wife, Rosemary Oliver MVO, in 1977. Rosemary subsequently launched and acted as sponsor of HMS Quorn, the mine countermeasures vessel.

In retirement Thompson continued his lifetime enthusiasm for model railways and acted as President of Bath Sea Cadets and the HMS Arethusa Association.

He was a committed Christian and a man of strict principle who abhorred humbug or self-serving behaviour. As one of his naval reports said of him "he was firm, forthright and fun."
