= Glenn Thompson =

Glenn Thompson may refer to:

- Glenn Thompson (publisher) (1940–2001), American book publisher and activist
- Glenn Thompson (politician) (born 1959), American politician
- Glenn Thompson (musician) (born 1964), Australian musician
- Glenn Thompson (cricketer) (born 1969), English cricketer

== See also ==
- Glen Thomson (born 1973), cyclist
