= Ernie Thompson (footballer, born 1892) =

English footballer

Personal information
- Full name: Ernest Thompson
- Date of birth: 1892
- Place of birth: Rotherham, England
- Height: 5 ft 8 in (1.73 m)
- Position: Winger

Senior career*
Years	Team	Apps	(Gls)
1911–1912	South Shields		
1912–1913	Rotherham County		
1913–1921	Portsmouth	36	(1)
1921–1922	The Wednesday	23	(0)
1922–1924	Bradford Park Avenue	50	(2)
1924–1925	Grimsby Town	7	(0)
1925	Castleford Town		
1925–1926	Denaby United		
1926–192?	Scunthorpe & Lindsey United		
- * Club domestic league appearances and goals

Ernest Thompson (born 1892) was an English professional footballer who played as a winger.
