= Robert Sheringham =

English linguist, scholar and royalist writer

Robert Sheringham (1602–1678) was an English linguist, scholar and royalist writer.

== Life ==
He was born in Guestwick, Norfolk. He studied at Gonville and Caius College, Cambridge, where he was B.A. in 1623, M.A.and Fellow in 1628. Though often believed to have been removed from his fellowship in 1644 (alongside the removal of other 'royalist' fellows), he held his post until 1651 before being expelled. He was restored in 1660. While in exile, he taught Arabic and Hebrew in Rotterdam.

== Works ==
He suggested a Talmudic origin of some of the New Testament parables. His Joma:Codex talmudicus (1648) was a Latin translation of and commentary on Yoma, the tractate of Seder Moed.

In The King's Supremacy Asserted (1660) he denied the possibility of a "mixed monarchy". Monarchy, he said, was "the government of one alone."

De Anglorum Gentis Origine Disceptatio (1670) was a work on the origins of the English language and people. It agreed with Samuel Bochart in its emphasis on the Phoenicians, and followed in part Verstegan in making English identity largely Germanic. It influenced Aylett Sammes (c. 1636 – c. 1679), author of Britannia Antiqua Illustrata. It took a linguistic interest in origins, matching Welsh words to the Greek language. David C. Douglas regarded it as too credulous.
