= Hugh Thompson (cricketer) =

English cricketer

Personal information
- Full name: Hugh Reginald Patrick Thompson
- Born: 11 April 1934; Scunthorpe, Lincolnshire, England
- Died: 8 December 2021 (aged 87); Rugby, Warwickshire, England
- Batting: Right-handed
- Bowling: Right-arm off break

Domestic team information
- Years: Team
- 1953–1954: Hampshire

Career statistics
Competition	First-class
Matches	2
Runs scored	16
Batting average	16.00
100s/50s	–/–
Top score	16
Balls bowled	390
Wickets	2
Bowling average	129.50
5 wickets in innings	–
10 wickets in match	–
Best bowling	2/106
Catches/stumpings	1/–
- Source: Cricinfo, 16 January 2010

Hugh Reginald Patrick Thompson (11 April 1934 — 8 December 2021) was an English first-class cricketer.

The son of Alan Robert Thompson, he was born at Scunthorpe in April 1934. He was educated at Cheltenham College, where he was a college prefect. He made two appearances in first-class cricket for Hampshire, with both matches coming against Oxford University at the University Parks in 1953 and 1954. He scored 16 runs in these matches, in addition to taking two wickets with his off break bowling. He later qualified as a chartered accountant in 1958. In later life, Thompson was a company director of Limehouse & Co. chartered accountants in Rugby. Thompson died at his home in Rugby in December 2021.
