= Alex Thompson (footballer) =

English footballer (1917–2002)

Personal information
- Full name: Alexander Thompson
- Date of birth: 8 December 1917
- Place of birth: Sheffield, England
- Date of death: 2002 (aged 84–85)
- Place of death: Sheffield, England
- Position: Full back

Youth career
- Sheffield Wednesday

Senior career*
Years	Team	Apps	(Gls)
1946–1948	Lincoln City	34	(1)
1948–1949	Tranmere Rovers	1	(0)
- Boston United
Total		35	(1)
- * Club domestic league appearances and goals

Alex Thompson (8 December 1917 – August 2002) was an English footballer, who played as a full back in the Football League for Tranmere Rovers.
