= Ralph Thompson (footballer) =

English footballer (1892–1916)

Personal information
- Full name: Ralph Motson Thompson
- Date of birth: 1892
- Place of birth: Grimsby, England
- Date of death: 1 July 1916 (aged 23–24)
- Place of death: near Ovillers-la-Boisselle, France
- Position: Outside left

Senior career*
Years	Team	Apps	(Gls)
- George Street Wesleyans
- Grimsby Rovers
- Grimsby St John's
- Grimsby Rovers
- Heycroft Rovers
1913–1914	Grimsby Town	12	(0)
- * Club domestic league appearances and goals

Ralph Motson Thompson (1892 – 1 July 1916) was an English amateur footballer who played in the Football League for Grimsby Town as an outside left.

== Personal life ==
Thompson's father John was chairman of Grimsby Town in 1905 and 1906 and his brother Albert also played for the club. Thompson himself was educated at Silcoates School and in 1911, he was working as a trainee auctioneer. Six weeks after the outbreak of the First World War, Thompson enlisted as a private in the Lincolnshire Regiment on 17 September 1914. While serving with the Grimsby Chums, he was wounded in the neck, arm and spine during the attack on Ovillers-la-Boisselle on the first day of the Somme in 1916. He could not be evacuated and was later found dead and buried. Thompson is commemorated on the Thiepval Memorial.

== Career statistics ==
Appearances and goals by club, season and competition
Club	Season	League			FA Cup		Total	
Club	Season	Division	Apps	Goals	Apps	Goals	Apps	Goals
Grimsby Town	1914–15	Second Division	11	0	0	0	11	0
Career total			11	0	0	0	11	0
