= Don Thompson (Australian footballer) =

Australian rules footballer

Personal information
- Full name: Don Thompson
- Born: 4 February 1937 (age 89)
- Original team: Collegians
- Height: 180 cm (5 ft 11 in)
- Weight: 80 kg (176 lb)

Playing career^{1}
Years	Club	Games (Goals)
1958	South Melbourne	1 (0)
- ^{1} Playing statistics correct to the end of 1958.

Don Thompson (born 4 February 1937) is a former Australian rules footballer who played with South Melbourne in the Victorian Football League (VFL).
