= Eddie Thompson (rugby union) =

Australian rugby union player

- Born: Edward George Thompson; 15 December 1906 Dalby, Queensland

Rugby union career
- Position: prop
International career
Years	Team	Apps	(Points)
1929–30	Wallabies	4	(0)

Edward George Thompson (born 15 December 1906) was a rugby union player who represented Australia.

Thompson, a prop, was born in Dalby, Queensland and claimed a total of 4 international rugby caps for Australia.
