= Barry Thompson =

Barry Thompson may refer to:

- Barry Thompson (rugby union) (1947–2006), New Zealand rugby union player
- Barry B. Thompson (1936–2014), American academic and administrator
- Barry James Thompson (born 1978), Australian and British developmental biologist and cancer biologist

== See also ==
- Barry Thomson, guitarist in Bolt Thrower
