= Gwen Thompson (disambiguation) =

Gwen Thompson (born 1947) is a Canadian violinist.

Gwen Thompson may also refer to:

- Lady Gwen Thompson (1928–1986), American witchcraft author
- Gwen Thompson, character in An American Girl: Chrissa Stands Strong
