= Jeremy Thompson =

Jeremy Thompson may refer to:

- Jeremy Thompson (journalist) (born 1948), English journalist and newsreader
- Jeremy Thompson (American football) (born 1985), former American football linebacker
- Jeremy Thompson (cricketer) (born 1963), English cricketer
- Jeremy Thompson (lacrosse) (born 1987), American lacrosse player
