= Ian Comrie-Thomson =

- Born: Ian Ritchie Comrie-Thomson c. 1903
- Died: c. 1982

Rugby union career
- Position: prop
International career
Years	Team	Apps	(Points)
1926–28	Wallabies	5	(0)

Ian Ritchie Comrie-Thomson (c. 1903 – c. 1982) was a rugby union player who represented Australia.

Comrie-Thomson, a prop, claimed a total of 5 international rugby caps for Australia.
