= Aaron Thompson (educator) =

American academic

Aaron Thompson is an American academic and the fourth president of the Kentucky Council on Postsecondary Education. Thompson is noted as the first black and native Kentuckian to hold the position.

== Biography ==
Thompson grew up in rural Clay County, Kentucky, the son of an illiterate coal miner and homemaker with no formal education beyond middle school. Thompson received his Bachelor of Arts in political science and sociology from Eastern Kentucky University in 1978, his Master of Arts in sociology from the University of Kentucky in 1990, and his doctorate in sociology from the University of Kentucky in 1992.

Thompson joined the Council in 2009 from Eastern Kentucky University, where he held a various academic positions and was a tenured professor in the department of educational and policy studies. At the Council, he served as Executive Vice President and Provost. In May 2016, he left the Council for more than a year to serve as interim president for Kentucky State University. In 2018, Thompson was named president of the Kentucky Council on Postsecondary Education, succeeding Robert L. King.

Thompson's leadership at the Council centered on his challenges as a student: improving the success of underrepresented minority students, expanding education access for rural and low-income students, improving the employability of Kentucky's college graduates, and increasing awareness about the value of higher education to both citizens and state.

Thompson has authored or co-authored books and peer-reviewed publications on topics including diversity, cultural competence, first-year experience programs, student retention and success.

Thompson was inducted into the Kentucky Civil Rights Hall of Fame and was made professor emeritus at Eastern Kentucky University in 2019. He was also recognized by Kentucky's legislature in a Senate resolution for his contributions to education in 2019.
