= Kevin Rolland Thompson =

Physicist

- Born: October 5, 1954; Minneapolis, Minnesota, USA
- Died: November 20, 2015 (aged 61)
- Occupation: Physicist
- Spouse: Jannick Rolland

Kevin Rolland Thompson (1954 – 2015) was the Group Director, Research and Development/Optics at Synopsys, Inc. His work contributed to developments in nanolithography, astrophysics and the advancement of optics

== Early life ==
Kevin Thompson was born in the suburbs of Minneapolis, in Edina. He graduated from Edina High School in 1972. In 1976 he received B.S. degrees in physics and astrophysics from the University of Minnesota. He received a Ph.D. for his work "Aberration fields in tilted and decentered optical systems", from the College of Optical Sciences with Roland Shack in 1980. His work on aberration of rotationally nonsymmetrical optical systems laid out initially on his thesis has been described as significant. The theory to treat these systems was called "Nodal Aberration Theory" (NAT).

== Later career ==
He worked at Perkin-Elmer Corporation for 10 years as an optical designer in microlithography applications and advanced systems for ground- and space-based remote sensing. He subsequently worked at Optical Research Associates for nearly 25 years, where he was vice president of optical engineering services. The company was acquired by Synopsys in 2010. At Synopsys he was group director of R&D in optics. At that time he was also a visiting scientist at the University of Rochester Institute of Optics. He was involved with optics projects with multiple companies over a 25-year period.

Highlights of his career include working on the null lens designs for the Hubble 1st Servicing Mission and optical modeling and analysis for the first generation EUV illuminator for lithography at 13nm node.

== Personal life ==
Kevin Thompson was married to Jannick Rolland (Professor of Optical Engineering) at the Institute of Optics at the University of Rochester and CTO of LighTopTech) He was a collector of historical books on optics.

== Posthumous ==
The Optical Society established an annual award in 2017. It is named Kevin P. Thompson Optical Design Innovator Award. The aim of the award is the following "Recognizes significant contributions to lens design, optical engineering, or metrology by an individual as evidenced by one or more of the following: innovative and rigorous research; optical system design with a foundation in aberration theory; development of advanced metrology capabilities; product development; patents; or publications."

== Honors and awards ==
SPIE A.E. Conrady Award in Optical Engineering, 2013

Alumnus of the Year of the College of Optical Sciences at the University of Arizona, 2015
