= Sydney Thompson =

Sydney Thompson may refer to:

- Sydney Thompson (musician), British bandleader
- Sydney Thompson (politician) (1906–1994), Australian politician
- Sydney Herbert Thompson (1920–1997), Canadian politician
- Sydney Thompson (artist) (1877–1973), New Zealand artist
- Sydney Mary Thompson (1847–1923), Irish geologist, botanist and artist
- Sydney Thompson (footballer) (1892–?), English footballer
