= Larry Thomason =

American politician (1948–2003)

Member of the Missouri House of Representatives from the 163rd district
- In office 1988–1998

Personal details
- Born: October 31, 1948 Jefferson City, Missouri
- Died: December 11, 2003 (aged 55)
- Party: Democratic

Larry Thomason (October 31, 1948 – December 11, 2003) was an American Democratic politician who served in the Missouri House of Representatives for 10 years. He previously served as the Missouri House of Representatives Majority Whip.

== Biography ==
Born in Jefferson City, Missouri, Thomason graduated from Arkansas State University with a bachelor's degree in communications. He was previously the director of the chamber of commerce in Kennett, Missouri, and had worked as a real estate appraiser. Thomason had served on advisory boards for Southeast Missouri State University, Dyersburg State Community College, and the Lower Mississippi River Delta Commission.

He died December 11, 2003, at age 55 following a heart attack during minor surgery. The Kennett Democrat was 55.
