= Alexander Thompson (cricketer, born 1876) =

English cricketer

Alexander Richard Thompson (1 December 1876 – 16 December 1951) was an English cricketer active from 1905 to 1908 who played for Northamptonshire (Northants). He was born in Stamford, Lincolnshire, and appeared in seventeen first-class matches as a righthanded batsman who scored 358 runs with a highest score of 48 not out. He died in Durban, Natal, South Africa, aged 75.
