= Max Thompson =

Max Thompson may refer to:

- Max Thompson (Medal of Honor) (1922–1996), United States Army soldier and Medal of Honor recipient
- Max Thompson (skier) (born 1984), Canadian Nordic combined skier
- Max Thompson (footballer, born 1956) (1956–2023), English former footballer
- Max Thompson (footballer, born 2002), English footballer
- Max Thompson (footballer, born 2004), English footballer
