= Tomescu =

Tomescu is a Romanian language surname. It is a patronymic form of the male given name Thomas – and may refer to:

- Aida Tomescu (1955), Australian contemporary artist
- Alexandru Tomescu (1976), Romanian violinist
- Constantina Tomescu-Dita (1970), Romanian long-distance runner
- Cynthia Tomescu (1991), Romanian handballer
