= Jennifer Thompson =

Jennifer Thompson may refer to:

- Jennifer Thompson (athlete) (born 1938), New Zealand discus thrower
- Jennifer Laura Thompson (born 1969), American stage actress
- Jenny Thompson (born 1973), American swimmer
- Jennifer Thompson, a critic of the reliability of eyewitness testimony following the exoneration of Ronald Cotton from her rape accusation

== See also ==
- Jenny Thompson (disambiguation)
- Jennifer Thomson, South African microbiologist
