= Justin Thompson =

Justin Thompson may refer to:

- Justin Thompson (baseball) (born 1973), Major League Baseball pitcher
- Justin Thompson (darts player) (born 1969), Australian darts player
- Justin Thompson (soccer) (born 1981), Canadian soccer defender
- Justin K. Thompson, American director of animated films.
