= Anthony Thompson (priest) =

Anthony Thompson was an Anglican priest in Ireland during the Eighteenth century.

Thompson was born at Shap and educated at Trinity College. He was Dean of Raphoe from 1744 until 1757; and then Vicar of Hutton Bonville.
