= Norman Thompson (footballer) =

English footballer

Personal information
- Full name: Norman Thompson
- Date of birth: 5 September 1900
- Place of birth: Forest Hall, England
- Date of death: 1989 (aged 88–89)
- Position: Inside forward

Senior career*
Years	Team	Apps	(Gls)
1919–1920	Denton Burn		
1920–1921	Newcastle United	0	(0)
1921–1922	Seaton Delaval		
1922–1923	Backworth United		
1923–1925	South Shields	43	(7)
1925–1926	Middlesbrough	8	(3)
1926	Barnsley	4	(0)
1926	Chilton Colliery Recreation		
1926–1927	York City		
1927	West Stanley		
1927–1930	Nottingham Forest	12	(3)
1930–1932	West Stanley		
1932	Newcastle East End		
1932	Carlisle United	0	(0)
1932–1934	West Stanley		
1934	Pretoria Municipal		
Total		67	(13)
- * Club domestic league appearances and goals

Norman Thompson (5 September 1900 – 1989) was an English footballer who played in the Football League for Barnsley, Middlesbrough, Nottingham Forest and South Shields.
