= Derek Thompson =

Derek Thompson may refer to:

- Derek Thompson (actor) (born 1948), British actor
- Derek Thompson (sports commentator) (born 1950), British presenter and commentator of horse racing
- Hoodlum Priest (musician) (actually Derek Thompson, active since 1989), English musician
- Derek Thompson (baseball) (born 1981), American baseball player
- Derek Thompson, character in the 2010 Canadian-American film Tooth Fairy
- Derek Thompson (journalist) (born 1986), American journalist and co-author of Abundance

== See also ==
- Derick Thomson (1921–2012), Scottish Gaelic poet and academic
