= Eric Thompson (disambiguation) =

Eric Thompson (1929–1982) was a British actor, husband of Phyllida Law and father of Emma Thompson.

Eric Thompson may also refer to:

- J. Eric S. Thompson (1898–1975), English archaeologist
- Eric Thompson (cricketer) (1938–1992), Scottish cricketer
- Eric Thompson (racing driver) (1919–2015), British race car driver
- Eric Thompson (cyclist) (1927–1996), British Olympic cyclist
- Eric Thompson (basketball) (born 1993), American basketball player
- Erik Thompson (born 1959), American voice actor and television announcer
- Viktor (wrestler) (born 1980), Canadian professional wrestler born Eric Thompson
