= Sean Thompson =

Sean Thompson may refer to:

- Sean Thompson (cricketer) (born 1972)
- Sean Thompson (baseball) (born 1995)
- Sean T (Sean Miguel Thompson), American rapper and producer
