= Elizabeth Thomson (linguist) =

Australian linguist

Elizabeth A. Thomson (born 1961) is an Australian linguist. She is an adjunct professor in the Division of Learning and Teaching at Charles Sturt University, and Principal Honorary Fellow of the School of Humanities and Social Inquiry at the University of Wollongong. She is known for her research in linguistics, language education and training, language other than English and curriculum & assessment design, and has made contributions to the field of English and Japanese linguistics from the Systemic Functional perspective. She is a foundation member of the Japan Association of Systemic Functional Linguistics (JASFL), a member of the International Systemic Functional Linguistics Association (ISFLA) and the Australian Systemic Functional Linguistics Association (ASFLA), and also an associate member of The Council of Australasian University Leaders in Learning and Teaching (CAULLT, formerly CADAD) and The Australasian Council on Open, Distance and e-Learning (ACODE).

== Education ==
Thomson was educated at Macquarie University, Sydney, and completed a BA majoring in Linguistics in 1984. In the same year, she completed a course in Advanced I Intensive Japanese at the Japanese Language Institute, Yotsuya. Four years later, in 1988, she completed her MA (Merit) in Applied Linguistics (Teaching English to Speakers of Other Languages—TESOL) at the University of Sydney. She completed a PhD in Education at the University of Wollongong in 2002. She holds a Masters of Philosophy from the University of NSW, Canberra in 2014.

She is a speaker of Japanese and Wiradjuri, having complete a Graduate Certificate in Wiradjuri Language and Culture, Charles Sturt University in 2017. Thomson is a Senior Fellow of the Higher Education Academy, UK.

== Contributions to linguistics and curriculum design ==
Thomson is known for her work in systemic functional linguistics, in particular in relation to the Japanese language, and has worked both in Japan and as a lecturer in Japanese and English Language at the University of Wollongong. She has contributed extensively to the linguistic description of text coherence in Japanese language, specifically in relation to genre and across numerous registers (e.g. news, education, literature and in workplace genres). Her work exploring these theories of language in context and text genre in Japanese (Thomson et al. 2017) was reviewed and commended for ‘providing an insightful picture of Japanese culture from the viewpoint of genre’. In collaboration, Thomson developed a CD ROM on Academic Writing based in systemic functional linguistics in conjunction with a student workbook.

Thomson's work with the Australian Defence Force includes leading curriculum redesign as the Director of Studies at the Defence Force School of Languages (2008-2012), bringing the Languages Other Than English (LOTE) courses in line with the Australian Quality Training Framework (AQTF) and conducting research into Defence language and culture as the 2013 Secretary of Defence Fellow.

Thomson is also known for her work in curriculum development and course design in higher education. In 2018, Thomson led two initiatives in curriculum innovation at Charles Sturt University, which resulted in the university being recognised in the Global Teaching Excellence Awards of 2018. The university received the following commendation from the Higher Education Academy judges:

“The curriculum is impressively designed and undergoes regular constructive alignment with industry practice and backward mapping between learning outcomes and assessment activities, with specific graduate attributes in mind. Charles Sturt University is to be commended for its strategic focus on teaching and learning and support to enable this to its faculty, especially in online education.”

== Selected publications ==
- Thomson, E.A. Sano, M. and de Silva Joyce, H. (eds.) (2017) Mapping genres, mapping culture: Japanese texts in context, John Benjamins Publishing, Amsterdam
- Thomson, E.A. (2014) Battling with Words, A study of language, diversity and social inclusion in the Australian Department of Defence, Department of Defence, Canberra.
- Thomson, E.A & Armour, W. (eds.) (2013) Systemic functional perspectives of Japanese: descriptions and applications, Equinox Publishing: London.
- Thomson, E.A. & Droga, L. (2012) Effective Academic Writing, Five Senses Education, Australia.
- Thomson, E.A. & White, P.R.R. (eds.) (2008) Communicating Conflict: multilingual case studies of the news media, Continuum: London.
- McGregor, K. with Thomson, E.A. (1998) David Larwill Craftsman House, Melbourne
- Thomson, E.A., Auhl, G., Uys, P., Wood, D. and Woolley, D. 2019 Towards best practice in course design: A case study of flexibility and collaboration between users and developers in supporting process with technology, Journal of University Teaching and Learning Practice, 16(1), 2019. Available at:
- Thomson, E.A. (2014) ‘Towards inclusion: Language use in the Department of Defence’, Special Report, Australian Strategic Policy Institute (ASPI), August 2014
- E.A. & de Silva Joyce, H. (2013) ‘Professional development – a pillar of curriculum change’, Professional and Academic English, IATEFL English for Specific Purposes Special Interest Group (ESP SIG) p. 36
- Thomson, E.A., Cléirigh, C., Head, L. & Muir, P. (2008) ‘Gardeners’ Talk: A linguistic study of relationships between environmental attitudes, beliefs and practices’, in Linguistics and the Human Sciences, Vol. 2.3, Equinox: London.
- Thomson, E.A., White, P.R.R., & Kitley, P. (2008) “Objectivity” and the “hard news” report across cultures: comparing the news report in English, French, Japanese and Indonesian journalism, in Journalism Studies, Special Issue on Journalism and Language, Vol. 9 No. 2, 2008.
- Thomson, E.A. (2005) ‘Theme Unit Analysis: A systemic functional treatment of textual meanings in Japanese’ in Functions of Language 12.2, John Benjamins Publishing Company pp. 151–181
- Thomson, E.A. (2001) ‘Themes, T-units and Method of Development: an examination of the news story in Japanese’, in JASFL Occasional Papers no. 2, 2001. Tokyo: Japan Association of Systemic Functional Linguistics
- Woodward-Kron, R., E. Thomson and J. Meek (2000) Academic Writing: A language based approach Wollongong: Gonichi Language Services (CD ROM).
- Thomson, E.A. (1998) ‘Thematic Development in NORUWEI NO MORI: Arguing the need to account for co-referential ellipsis’, in JASFL Occasional Papers no. 1 1998. Tokyo: Japan Association of Systemic Functional Linguistics (JASFL)
- Thomson, E.A. (1998) ‘Testing for Theme in Japanese’, in Sekai no Nihongo Kyooiku, vol. 8 (Japanese-Language Education Around the Globe), Tokyo: The Japan Foundation Japanese Language Institute.
- Thomson, E.A. and Woodward-Kron, R. (1997) ‘Teaching Academic English: Language and culture in the academic community’, in Overview, University of Wollongong. ISSN 1320-3304
- Mulvihill (nee Thomson), E.A. (1992) ‘Designing a Japanese for Specific Purpose Course: Putting Theory into Practice’, in Japanese Teaching Around the Globe Journal. vol.2 March 1992. Tokyo: The Japan Foundation Japanese Language Institute. ISSN:0917-2920.
