= C. V. R. Thompson =

British journalist

- Died: 1951 (aged 44–45); Knickerbocker Hospital, New York City
- Other names: Cecil Victor Raymond Thompson; Cecil V.R. Thompson
- Occupation: journalist
- Known for: President of the Foreign Correspondents Association
- Spouses: Dixie Tighe; Sally Ann Mennan

C. V. R. Thompson was a journalist from the United Kingdom, who reported from the United States from 1933 until his death in 1951. His obituary in The New York Times called him the "dean of the English newspaper corps." He served as president of the Foreign Correspondents Association.

He married twice, from 1934 to 1946 to American journalist Dixie Tighe, and to Sally Ann Meenan from 1946 until his death. He and Meenan had two children.

He worked for The Daily Express for his entire newspaper career, joining in 1926.

Thompson was also the author of several books, including I lost my English Accent (1939), Trousers Will be Worn (1941) and How to like an Englishman (1946).

In its review the Bronxville Record-Press told readers that Trousers Will be Worn is a witty examination of "cafe society". It assured them the "spicy sketches" in the book revolved around the kind of fashionable "names" who visited nightclubs, like the Stork Club. It particularly recommended the book to the kind of person who likes visiting New York City, but who wouldn't want to live there.
