= Leonard Thompson =

Leonard Thompson may refer to:

- Leonard Thompson (historian) (1916–2004), Yale University professor and writer on South African politics and apartheid
- Leonard Thompson (diabetic) (1908–1935), first person to receive an insulin injection
- Leonard Thompson (businessman) (1914-1976), owner and managing director of Blackpool Pleasure Beach
- Leonard Thompson (golfer) (born 1947), American PGA Tour and Champions Tour professional golfer
- Leonard Thompson (American football) (1952–2021), former NFL wide receiver for the Detroit Lions
- Leonard Thompson (footballer) (1901–1968), footballer who played for Arsenal FC

== See also ==
- Len Thompson (1947–2007), Australian rules footballer
