= Tony Thompson =

Tony Thompson may refer to:

- Tony Thompson (drummer) (1954–2003), American session drummer
- Tony Thompson (singer) (1975–2007), R&B vocalist and Hi-Five lead singer
- Tony Thompson (boxer) (born 1971), American boxer
- Tony Thompson (footballer) (born 1994), English footballer
- Tony Thompson (politician) (born 1977), American politician from Iowa

== See also ==
- Toni Thompson, Shortland Street character
- Anthony Thompson (disambiguation)
