= Ernest Thompson (musician) =

Blind American musician

- Born: Ernest Errott Thompson; February 20, 1892; Clemmons, North Carolina, U.S.
- Died: December 7, 1961 (aged 69) Greensboro, North Carolina
- Genres: Country; traditional; Tin Pan Alley; ragtime; show tunes
- Occupations: Musician; songwriter; street performer
- Instruments: Vocals; guitar; harmonica; banjo; fiddle; mandolin; autoharp; cello; drums
- Years active: 1915–1950s

Ernest Errott Thompson (February 20, 1892 – December 7, 1961) was a blind street musician from Winston-Salem, North Carolina, who was one of the earliest country musicians to be recorded in the United States. In his sessions with Columbia Records in 1924, Thompson recorded many songs that today are considered among the most iconic from country music's early history, including "Are You from Dixie?", "Old-Time Religion", "Bury Me Beneath the Willow", "Wreck of the Southern Old 97", "Life's Railway to Heaven" and "Little Rosewood Casket".

Blinded as the result of a work-related accident in his late teens, Thompson spent most of his life as a street musician, singing to his own accompaniment on guitar and harmonica. In 1924, he was discovered by a Columbia A&R (Artist & Repertoire) representative who signed him to a recording contract. Thompson traveled to New York City for three recording sessions that year and returned in 1930 for two more sessions. However, sales of his records proved disappointing, and Columbia cancelled his contract. After a couple sessions with another label, Thompson's recording career ended, and he returned to his life as an itinerant musician, playing on the streets well into his fifties.

== Early life ==
Thompson was born in 1892 in Clemmons, North Carolina, a suburb of Winston-Salem. When he was 18, he severely injured his eyes in an accident in the saw mill where he worked. He soon became blind. From around 1912 to 1914, he attended the North Carolina School for the Blind and Deaf in Raleigh learning to make brooms and mattresses and tune pianos. Around this time, Thompson began honing his musical skills. Music seemed a more preferable way to earn a living than what his training suggested, so he took to the streets as a musician, a career path followed by many blind virtuosos in the 1910s and 1920s, such as Andrew Jenkins, Reverend Gary Davis, Blind Lemon Jefferson, Ed Haley, and Blind Willie McTell.

In 1917, Thompson married Bettie Viola Hauser, but after four years she experienced a mental breakdown and was institutionalized the rest of her life. Meanwhile, he continued to eke out a living playing on the streets as well as at schools, dances and other gatherings.

== Recording career ==
In 1924, William S. Parks, the A&R representative for Columbia Records in Atlanta, was looking for "hillbilly" musicians to record and had recently recruited another blind musician, Riley Puckett, who would become one of the record company's most successful artists of the mid-1920s. Through Columbia's dealership in Winston-Salem, Parks learned about Thompson and immediately drove to the musician's small farm just outside the city. After listening to him play one song after another, Parks was convinced he had found what he was looking for and immediately offered to take the musician to New York City to record his songs. Thompson jumped at the opportunity. In April he recorded some 20 songs at Columbia's New York studios and returned in September to perform another dozen songs.

The recordings opened opportunities for Thompson to perform in Winston-Salem and the surrounding region. His new-found success made it possible for him to replace the low quality guitar he had been playing with one of Gibson's top models, and he was able to buy an automobile for friends to drive him to engagements. Meanwhile, Thompson constantly worked on developing his skills, becoming adept at 26 instruments, including banjo, mandolin, fiddle, cello, autoharp, piano and drums.

Thompson returned to New York in September 1930 for two more sessions with Columbia, but only a few of the songs he recorded were released. Realizing the supply of traditional material was limited and that audiences were developing more sophisticated tastes, record companies began looking for new sounds and new songs. As a result of the changing market and Thompson's less than encouraging sales, Columbia dropped him from its roster. The musician made one last attempt at recording, with the Gennett label in Indiana, but when only four of the 14 sides he recorded were released, he returned to his life as a street musician.

In the early 1930s, Thompson began traveling with Cora Pistollious, a street performer who was mostly blind and who became his second wife. With the Great Depression worsening, the two turned up destitute in Baltimore. Somehow they managed to return to North Carolina, where Thompson spent the rest of the 1930s through the end of World War II playing in relative obscurity. By the late 1940s, Thompson's livelihood was being curtailed by city ordinances against street performers, and his health was beginning to decline.

== Death ==
In 1949, Thompson and Cora moved to High Point just east of Winston-Salem in Guilford County. He eventually was admitted to the Guilford County Home in nearby Greensboro where he died of heart failure in 1961.
