= Fred Thompson (footballer, born 1870) =

English footballer

Personal information
- Full name: Frederick Thompson
- Date of birth: 1870
- Place of birth: Sheffield, England
- Date of death: 1898 (aged 27–28)
- Position: Wing half

Senior career*
Years	Team	Apps	(Gls)
1886–1887	Hastings (Sheffield)		
1887–1890	The Wednesday		
1890–1892	Lincoln City		
1892–1893	Nottingham Forest	1	(0)
- * Club domestic league appearances and goals

Frederick Thompson (1870–1898) was an English footballer who played in the Football League for Nottingham Forest. His only League appearance for Forest was on 10 September 1892 in a 4–3 defeat against Stoke despite making multiple Football Alliance and friendly appearances for them.
