= Alexander Thomson (poet) =

Scottish poet

- Born: 7 August 1763
- Died: 7 November 1803 (aged 40); Edinburgh, Scotland
- Occupation: Poet

Alexander Thomson (7 August 1763 – 7 November 1803) was a Scottish poet.

== Biography ==
Thomson was born on 7 August 1763. He resided in Edinburgh, and was an intimate friend of Robert Anderson (1750–1830). Thomson was the author of several poems, of which the best known were "Whist" (London, 1791, 4to; 2nd edit. 1792, 8vo) and "An Essay on Novels" (Edinburgh, 1793, 4to). He died in Edinburgh on 7 November 1803, leaving a widow and six daughters.

Besides the works mentioned, Thomson published:

"The Choice," a poem, Edinburgh, 1788, 4to. "The Paradise of Taste," London, 1796, 4to. "Pictures of Poetry," Edinburgh, 1799, 8vo. "The British Parnassus at the Close of the Eighteenth Century," Edinburgh, 1801, 4to. "Sonnets, Odes, and Elegies," Edinburgh, 1801, 8vo. He also published "The German Miscellany," Perth, 1796, 12mo, consisting of translations from August von Kotzebue and August Gottlieb Meißner, and translated Kotzebue's comedy, "The East Indian," London, 1799, 8vo. He left an unfinished "History of Scottish Poetry."
