= Ken Thompson (footballer, born 1945) =

English footballer

Personal information
- Full name: Kenneth John Thompson
- Date of birth: 1 March 1945 (age 81)
- Place of birth: Ipswich, England
- Position: Half-back

Senior career*
Years	Team	Apps	(Gls)
1962–1966	Ipswich Town	12	(0)
1966–1967	Exeter City	39	(1)
1967–1977	Yeovil Town		
Total		51	(1)
- * Club domestic league appearances and goals

Kenneth John Thompson (born 1 March 1945) was an English professional footballer who played as a half-back in the Football League for Ipswich Town and Exeter City, and in non-League football for Yeovil Town.
