= Alexander Thomson (minister) =

Alexander Thomson (c. 1593 – 1646) was a minister in the Church of Scotland in the early 17th century during the lead up to the Wars of the Three Kingdoms. He was ejected from the ministry for supporting the King and the Book of Common Prayer.

== Life ==
He was the son of Rev Alexander Thomson, minister of Stonehouse in Lanarkshire. Alexander graduated M.A. from Glasgow University in 1613. Ten years later, in 1623, he was presented by James Hamilton, 2nd Marquess of Hamilton (a supporter of the King) to the Kirk Session of Cambuslang and ordained as minister of the parish church.

On 3 July 1628 the Town Council of Edinburgh elected him to be one of the four ministers of St Giles, Edinburgh, when the large parish of Edinburgh was split into four parishes. In 1638 the General Assembly of the Church of Scotland declared the National Covenant and defied King Charles I's Episcopalian policies. It demanded that ministers refuse the King's order to use the new Scottish Book of Common Prayer Book, based on the Anglican Book of Common Prayer. Mr Thomson declined to follow this demand, and sided with the King, not only using the new prayer book in his services, but defending its use more widely. Soon afterwards on 1 January 1639 he was deposed by the General Assembly.

He died in 1646, aged about 53.

== Family ==
He married Margaret Moorehead, and had a son James, whom he apprenticed to James Stewart, a merchant in Edinburgh, on 6 Nov. 1639. After the Restoration of the King, another son, John, got £100 5 July 1661, sterling from Parliament, 5 July 1661, in respect of his father's sufferings. He had another son, William, and a daughter Margaret, who married James Hamilton, the Bishop of Galloway, further confirming his Episcopalian sympathies.

== Sources ==
- Porter, Wm Henry Cambuslang and its Ministers (in Mitchell Library - Glasgow Collection, reference GC941.433 CAM 188520 Box 952
- Scott, Hew Fasti Ecclesiae Scoticanae V4: The Succession of Ministers in the Church of Scotland from the Reformation Edinburgh 1922
- Wilson, James Alexander OBE, MD A History of Cambuslang: a Clydesdale parish. Jackson Wylie & Co Glasgow (1929)
