= Ken Thompson (footballer, born 1926) =

English footballer

Personal information
- Full name: Kenneth Hurst Thompson
- Date of birth: 24 April 1926
- Place of birth: Sunderland, County Durham, England
- Date of death: February 2008 (aged 81)
- Place of death: Shipston-on-Stour, Warwickshire, England
- Height: 5 ft 11 in (1.80 m)
- Position: Full-back

Senior career*
Years	Team	Apps	(Gls)
1944–1950	Middlesbrough	0	(0)
1946–1947	→ Gateshead (loan)	9	(0)
1950–1951	York City	22	(0)
Total		31	(0)
- * Club domestic league appearances and goals

Kenneth Hurst Thompson (24 April 1926 – February 2008) was an English professional footballer who played as a full-back in the Football League for Gateshead and York City, and was on the books of Middlesbrough without making a league appearance.
