= Walter Thompson =

Walter Thompson may refer to:

- J. Walter Thompson, an advertisement holding company
- James Walter Thompson (1847–1928), founder of the J. Walter Thompson advertising agency
- Walter Thompson (composer) (born 1952), American musician
- Walter A. Thompson (1903–1975), American film editor
- Walter H. Thompson (1890–1978), bodyguard of Winston Churchill
- Walter P. Thompson (1889–1970), President of the University of Saskatchewan, 1949–1959
- Walter Thompson (engineer) (fl. 1870s), builder of a section of the East-West Telegraph Line in South Australia

== See also ==
- Walter Thomson (1895–1964), Canadian politician
