= Chris Thompson (cricketer) =

English cricketer (born 1987)

Christopher Everton Junior Thompson (born 26 June 1987 in Lambeth) is an English cricketer active from 2005 who has played for Leicestershire. He appeared in one first-class match in 2009 as a righthanded batsman who bowls right arm fast medium. He scored 16 runs with a highest score of 16 and took one wickets with a best performance of one for 45.
