= Keith Thompson =

Keith Thompson may refer to:

- Keith Thompson (politician), veteran figure in the British far right
- H. Keith Thompson (1922–2002), New York City-based corporate executive and figure within American far right circles
- Keith Thompson (footballer) (born 1965), retired professional footballer from England
- Keith R. Thompson (1951–2022), professor of oceanography at Dalhousie University

== See also ==
- Keith Thomson (disambiguation)
