= Ruth Thompson (disambiguation) =

Ruth Thompson (1887–1970) was a Republican politician from the U.S. state of Michigan.

Ruth Thompson may also refer to:

- Ruth Plumly Thompson (1891–1976), American writer of children's stories
- Ruth Pickett Thompson, American synchronized swimmer
- Ruth Thompson (civil servant) (1953–2016), British civil servant
