= Jacob Thompson (disambiguation) =

Jacob Thompson (1810–1885) was the United States Secretary of the Interior and later the Inspector General of the Confederate States Army.

Jacob or Jake Thompson may also refer to:

- Jacob Thompson (painter) (1806–1879), English landscape painter
- Jacob Gordon Thompson, Georgia State Patrol officer charged with the killing of Julian Edward Roosevelt Lewis in 2020
- Jake Thompson (born 1994), American baseball pitcher

== Other uses ==
- Jacob Thompson House, located in Monson, Massachusetts

== See also ==
- Jake Thomson (born 1989), English footballer
- J. Thompson Baker (1847–1919), American Democratic Party politician from New Jersey
- Martín Jacobo Thompson (1777–1819), Argentine patriot
