= Edward Thomson =

Edward Thomson may refer to:

- Edward Thomson (bishop) (1810–1870) American bishop of the Methodist Episcopal Church.
- Edward Deas Thomson (1800–1879), Australian administrator and politician
- Edward Hughes Thomson (1810–1886), American lawyer and politician in Michigan
- Edward William Thomson (1794–1865), Canadian farmer and politician
- Edward William Thomson (writer) (1849–1924), Canadian writer and journalist
- Eddie Thomson (1947–2003), Scottish footballer
- Edwin Charles Tubb (1919–2010), One of many pseudonyms used by the British writer

== See also ==
- Edward Thompson (disambiguation)
