= PA System (artist group) =

PA System is a collaboration between Alexa Hatanaka and Patrick Thompson. They are known for large murals in Canadian cities as well as the application of mural techniques onto a large ice wall on Baffin Island. This collaboration with young Inuit artists Parr Etidloie and Audi Qinnuayuak was documented in a movie.

As PA System, they have founded the Embassy of Imagination (EOI), a multidisciplinary arts initiative for youth based in Cape Dorset ( ᑭᙵᐃᑦ, Kinngait), Nunavut.
