= Christopher Thompson =

Christopher Thompson may refer to:

- Christopher Thompson (actor) (born 1966), French actor and script author
- Christopher Thompson (runner) (born 1981), British long-distance runner
- Christopher Newton Thompson (1919–2002), South African soldier, sportsman, educationalist and anti-apartheid politician
- Christopher Thompson (astronomer) (born 1961), Canadian astronomer and astrophysicist
- Christopher Warwick Thompson (born 1938), English academic and writer

== See also ==
- Chris Thompson (disambiguation)
