= Francis Thompson (historian) =

English economic and social historian

Francis Michael Longstreth Thompson CBE FBA (13 August 1925 – 23 August 2017) was an English economic and social historian. He wrote several books.

== Early life ==
The son of Francis Longstreth Thompson, he was educated at Bootham School, York; The Queen's College, Oxford, where he took a first-class BA in 1949; and Merton College, Oxford, from 1949 to 1951, taking a DPhil in 1956.

== Career ==
He was Reader in Economic History at University College London in 1963. He became Professor of Modern History at Bedford College in 1968, and was from 1977 to 1990 director of the Institute of Historical Research, University of London.

He was president of the Royal Historical Society from 1989 to 1993.

He was best known for English Landed Society in the Nineteenth Century (1963), which made the role of the landed gentry a high-priority topic for agrarian and political history. He also studied urban middle and working classes, and suburbia. He added to the long-standing debate on British class history by new emphasis on "respectability." Thompson argued that it operated across class boundaries and provided a powerful stabilizing counterbalance to the working class upheavals of Victorian society. His model of society contradicted the more commonly employed Marxist assumptions. He opened up a field that has attracted many younger scholars.

== Personal life ==
In 1951 Thompson married Anne Challoner; they had two sons and a daughter.

Thompson died on 23 August 2017, aged 92. Anne Thompson died on 27 March 2024.

== Works ==
- Victorian England: the horse-drawn society; an inaugural lecture (1970) at Bedford College LCCN 76-596277 ISBN 0900145048
- English Landed Society in the Nineteenth Century (1963); Thompson, F. M. L. (28 February 2013). 2013 edition. Taylor & Francis. ISBN 978-0415848480.
- Hampstead: Building a Borough, 1650–1964 (1974) LCCN 73-87319 ISBN 0710077475
- The Rise of Suburbia (1982) editor LCCN 81-21304 ISBN 0312684339
- Horses in European Economic History: a preliminary canter (1983) editor ISBN 0903269023
  - summary from Carriage Association of America (CAA); abstract from Archaeology Data Service (ADS)
- The Rise of Respectable Society: A Social History of Victorian Britain, 1830–1900 (1988) LCCN 88-14802 1988 pbk edition. Harvard University Press. 1988. ISBN 0-674-77285-7.
- The University of London and the World of Learning, 1836–1986 (1990, editor); ISBN 1852850329
- The Cambridge Social History of Britain, 1750–1950 (1990, three volumes) editor LCCN 89-9840
  - vol. 1 ISBN 0521257883; vol. 2 ISBN 0521257891; vol. 3 ISBN 0521257905
- Gentrification and the Enterprise Culture: Britain 1780–1980 (1993) Ford Lectures; 2001 edition. Oxford University Press. 2001. ISBN 0199243301. Thompson, F. M. L. (2003). 2003 edition. Oxford University Press. ISBN 0199265607.
- Landowners, Capitalists and Entrepreneurs: Essays for Sir John Habakkuk (1994, editor) ISBN 0198283016
- English Landed Society Revisited: The Collected Papers of F. M. L. Thompson (2017, 2 vols.)
  - vol. 1 ISBN 1911204637; vol. 2 ISBN 1911204653

Academic offices
Preceded by Gerald Aylmer	President of the Royal Historical Society; 1989–1993	Succeeded by Sir Rees Davies
