= Ian Thompson =

Ian Thompson may refer to:

- Ian Thompson (runner) (born 1949), English long-distance runner
- Ian Thompson (high jumper) (1968–1999), Bahamian high jumper
- Ian Thompson (politician) (1935–2009), former member of the Western Australian Legislative Assembly
- Ian Thompson (footballer, born 1958), English footballer
- Ian Thompson (Australian footballer) (born 1949), Australian rules footballer
- Ian Maclaren Thompson (1896–1981), Newfoundland anatomist and medical author

== See also ==
- Ian Thomson (disambiguation)
