= SS Colonist =

19th century British screw steamer

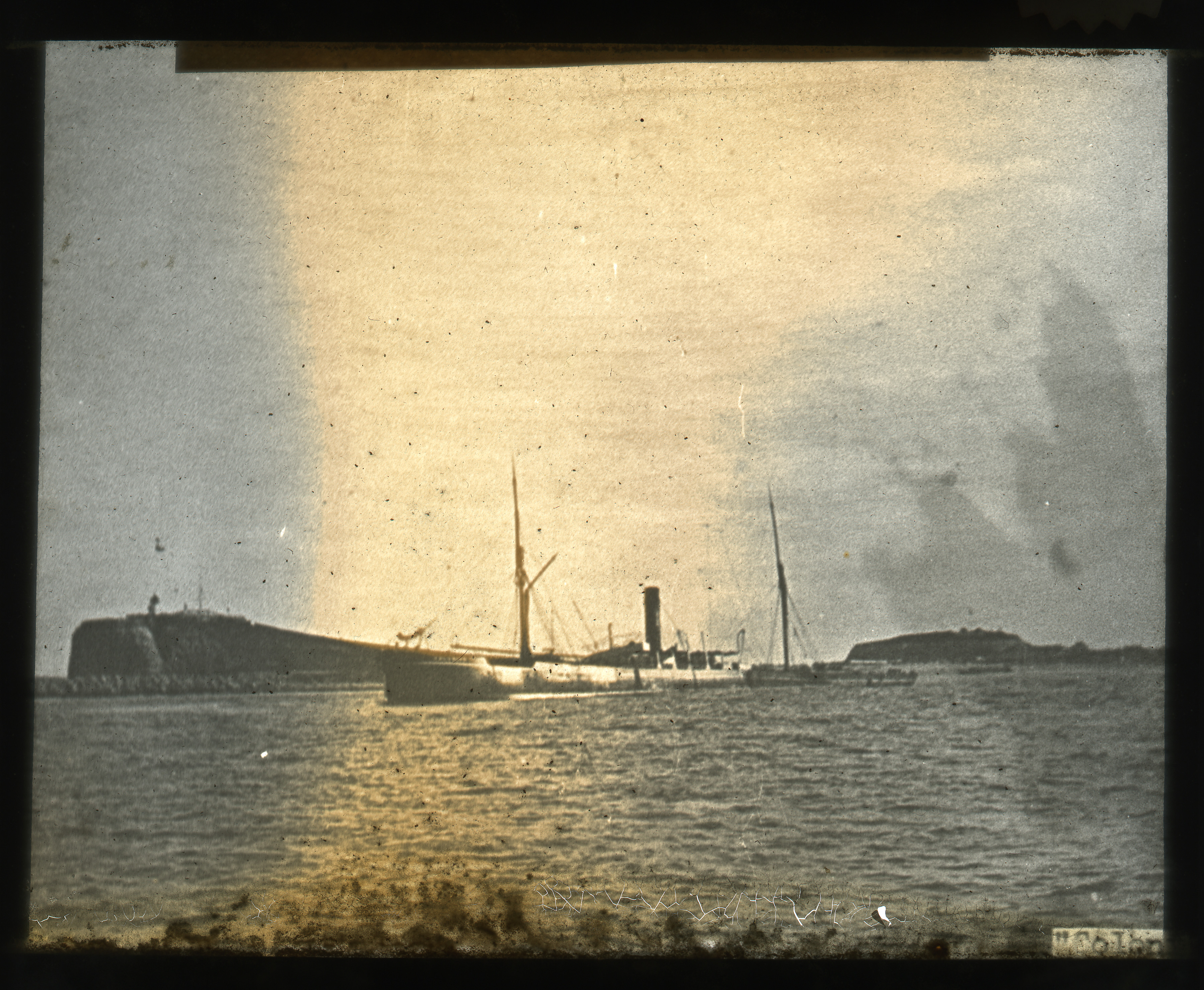
- The wreck in 1894

History

United Kingdom
- Name: Colonist
- Owner: Angier Line, London
- Port of registry: London
- Builder: Osbourne, Graham & Co. Ltd, North Hylton
- Yard number: 82
- Launched: 12 October 1889
- Completed: 1889
- Identification: Official number: 96673
- Fate: Wrecked, 9 September 1894

General characteristics
- Type: Iron screw steamer
- Tonnage: 819 GRT
- Length: 88.4 m (290 ft 0 in)
- Beam: 11.6 m (38 ft 1 in)
- Draught: 6.1 m (20 ft 0 in)
- Installed power: Triple expansion engine
- Crew: 29

SS Colonist was a British iron-hulled coastal cargo ship driven by a 3-cylinder triple expansion steam engine. She was built in 1889 by Osbourne, Graham & Co. Ltd, North Hylton, England. She had a complement of 29 crewmembers.

== Shipwrecked ==
On 9 September 1894, traveling from Newcastle, New South Wales on her way to Adelaide while carrying a cargo of coal Colonist was wrecked on Newcastle's Oyster Bank at position 32.914°S 151.797°E.
