= Frederick L. Thompson =

American politician

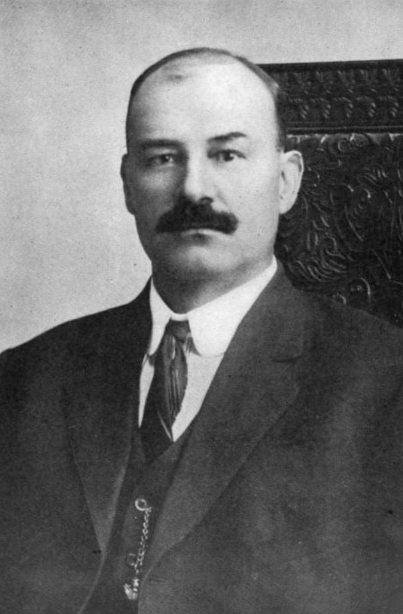

Member of the Wyoming House of Representatives

Personal details
- Born: Frederick Louis Thompson; July 28, 1871 Round Grove, Missouri, U.S.
- Died: May 9, 1944 (aged 72) Cheyenne, Wyoming, U.S.
- Party: Democratic
- Spouse: Bertha B. Meador
- Children: 6
- Parents: John J. Thompson (father); Isabella Rowland (mother)

Frederick Louis Thompson (July 28, 1871 – May 9, 1944) was an American politician who served as treasurer of Fremont County as a Democrat.

== Life ==
Frederick Louis Thompson was born in Round Grove, Missouri on July 28, 1871 to John J. Thompson and Isabella Rowland. When he was seven his mother died and his father died two years later causing him to be raised by his uncle W. L. Thompson.

On February 13, 1899 he won the Democratic nomination for Macon County school superintendent with 130 1/2 votes out of the 150 votes. He won in the general election and served from 1899 to 1905 as Macon County school superintendent.

On May 2, 1907 he left Missouri and moved to Wyoming. From 1911 to 1915 he served as treasurer of Fremont County and in 1914 he was the Democratic nominee for Wyoming Treasurer, but was defeated by Herman B. Gates. On January 16, 1926 he was appointed as chief of police in Cheyenne, Wyoming by Mayor C. W. Riner and served until January 7, 1930.

He was elected to the state house and in 1941 he ran for mayor of Cheyenne, but came last in the primary. On May 9, 1944 Thompson suffered a heart attack and died in Cheyenne, Wyoming at age 72.

== Electoral history ==
1941 Cheyenne mayoral primary
Party	Candidate	Votes	%
Nonpartisan	Ed Warren	1,971	33.37%
Nonpartisan	John J. McInerney	1,784	30.21%
Nonpartisan	Robert G. Caldwell	1,621	27.45%
Nonpartisan	Frederick L. Thompson	530	8.97%
Total votes		5,906	100.00%
