= Julius Thomson =

Julius Thomson may refer to:

- Julius Thomson (fencer) (1888–1960), German Olympic fencer
- Julius Thomson (rower) (1882–1940), Canadian Olympic rower
