= Frank Thomson (footballer) =

Scottish footballer

Personal information
- Full name: Frank Thomson
- Place of birth: Scotland
- Position: Left back

Senior career*
| Years | Team | Apps | (Gls) |
- Drumchapel Amateur
| 1969–1977 | Queen's Park | 68 | (0) |

International career
| 1971 | Scotland Amateurs | 3 | (0) |
- * Club domestic league appearances and goals

Frank Thomson is a retired amateur Scottish football left back who appeared in the Scottish League for Queen's Park. He was capped by Scotland at amateur level.
