= Lee Thompson =

Lee Thompson may refer to:

- Lee Thompson (baseball) (1898–1963), Major League Baseball pitcher
- Lee Thompson (footballer) (born 1982), midfielder for Kidderminster Harriers F.C.
- Lee Thompson (politician) (1908–1975), former Florida Commissioner of Agriculture
- Lee Thompson (saxophonist) (born 1957), saxophonist of the ska/pop band Madness
- Lee Thompson (sprinter) (born 1997), English sprinter
- Lee A. Thompson, American psychologist
- J. Lee Thompson (1914–2002), British film director
- Lee Thompson (EastEnders), fictional character
