= Nathan Thompson =

Nathan Thompson may refer to:

- Nathan Thompson (rapper) (born 1989), American rapper
- Nathan Thompson (Australian footballer) (born 1978), Australian rules footballer
- Nathan Thompson (English footballer) (born 1990), English professional footballer
