= Tomaszewicz =

Tomaszewicz is a Polish language surname. It is a patronymic form of the male given name Thomas – and may refer to:

- Andrzej Tomaszewicz (1943–2020), Polish historian and politician
- Anna Tomaszewicz-Dobrska (1854–1918), Polish physician
