= Daniel Thompson =

Daniel, Dan, or Danny Thompson may refer to:

== In arts and media ==
- Danny Thompson (1939–2025), English double bass player
- Danny Ray Thompson (1947–2020), American jazz saxophonist with Sun Ra's Arkestra
- Danny Thompson (drummer) (born 1967), drummer for American punk rock band Face to Face
- Daniel Thompson (poet) (1935–2004), American poet and activist in Cleveland, Ohio
- Daniel Pierce Thompson (1795–1868), American novelist and lawyer in Vermont
- Daniel V. Thompson (1902–1980), American art historian and translator

== In sport ==
- Danny Thompson (baseball) (1947–1976), American baseball infielder
- Dan Thompson (footballer) (born 1993), English footballer
- Danny Thompson (racing driver) (born 1948), American racing driver
- Dan Thompson (swimmer) (born 1956), Canadian butterfly swimmer
- Dan Thompson (speedway rider), (born 2004), English speedway rider

== Other people ==
- Danny Thompson (bounty hunter), American bounty hunter in the reality series Airplane Repo
- Daniel Thompson (inventor) (1921–2015), Canadian-born American inventor and entrepreneur

== See also ==
- Danny Thomson (born 1991), Scottish footballer
- Daniel Thomson
