= Marc Thompson =

Marc Thompson may refer to:

- Marc Thompson (cyclist) (born 1953), American cyclist
- Marc Thompson (footballer) (born 1982), English footballer
- Marc Thompson (voice actor) (born 1975), American voice actor

== See also ==
- Mark Thompson (disambiguation)
