= Garry Thomson =

Robert Howard Garry Thomson CBE, (13 September 1925 – 23 May 2007) was a conservator and chemist who became a Buddhist.

== Biography ==
Robert Howard Garry Thomson (known as Garry Thomson) was born on Carey Island, Malaya, where his father was a planter producing palm oil. He attended Charterhouse School, in England, after which he served with the Royal Electrical and Mechanical Engineers in India at the end of the Second World War before going on to Magdalene College, Cambridge, where he read Chemistry. From 1951 to 1955, he worked on the editorial staff of 'A History of Technology', then began his long association with the National Gallery in London, where he started as a research chemist.

== Professional life ==
Garry Thomson began his career as a Research Chemist, at the National Gallery (London), a post he held from 1955 to 1960, when he was promoted to Scientific Adviser to the Trustees and Head of the Scientific Department at the National Gallery from 1960 a post he held until his retirement in 1985. In 1968 Garry organized the first conference on museum climatology for the International Institute for Conservation (IIC) in London. He also served as President of the International Institute for Conservation (IIC), from 1983 to 1986. He undertook various missions for ICCROM, including to Algeria, India and Lebanon. With colleagues, he conceived the ICCROM course on 'Scientific Principles of Conservation', which was launched in Rome in 1974, and in which he also taught. In 1976 he contributed to the new ICCROM course on 'Preventive Conservation' and was a regular lecturer at ICCROM until 1989. Following his retirement he was a trustee of the National Museums and Galleries on Merseyside from 1986 to 1991. In 1999 he received the first Plowden Gold Medal, awarded by the Royal Warrant Holders' Association to recognise the most significant contributions to the advancement of the conservation profession.

== Editorships ==
- Honorary editor from 1959 to 1967 of Studies in Conservation, the journal of the International Institute for Conservation (IIC)
- Recent Advances in Conservation (1963)
- Museum Climatology (1967)

== The Museum Environment ==
The Museum Environment

Garry Thomson made a significant contribution to Conservation science, Preventive conservation, and Art conservation as a whole with his publication 'The Museum Environment' first published in 1978, and revised in 1986. This book became the major source of information regarding recommendations for environmental conditions in museums around the world, and although the guidelines are no longer followed as rigidly as they once were, it continues to be a significant guiding book for the discipline. Its popularity continues at least in part due to the way in which he explained complicated scientific concepts in simple terms. The Museum Environment set out parameters for the best conditions in which objects could be stored and displayed within the Museum Environment.

== Honours and awards ==
- Commander of the Order of the British Empire (CBE) appointed in 1983
- Recipient of the ICCROM Award (1986)
- The first recipient of the Plowden Gold Medal (1999)

== Personal life ==
Garry Thomson married, in 1954, Mom Rajawongse Saisvasdi Svasti (known as Noy), the daughter of a Thai prince. They had four sons. Outside of his family and professional life the other consuming interest of Thomson's life was Buddhism, which dated back to his time as an undergraduate at Cambridge, where he started a Buddhist group.

For several decades he was a member of the Buddhist Society of London, one of Europe's earliest Buddhist organisations, serving on its council and as vice-president (1978–88); he also taught its basic meditation class. He gave public talks and wrote articles and book reviews for the society's journal Middle Way, and was a regular contributor to the society's summer school, producing numerous talks.

== Publications ==
- The Museum Environment (1978) (1986)
- Reflections on the life of Buddha (1982)
- The Sceptical Buddhist (1995)
