= Gary Thomson =

Irish cyclist (born 1963)

Personal information
- Born: 4 November 1963 (age 62) Dublin, Ireland

Cycling career
- Sport: Cycling

Gary Thomson (born 4 November 1963) is an Irish former cyclist. He competed in the individual road race and the team time trial events at the 1984 Summer Olympics.
