= Samuel Thompson (newspaper editor) =

Samuel Thompson (August 27, 1810 – July 8, 1886) was a Canadian businessman and newspaper editor.

== Early years ==
Samuel Thompson was born in London, England on August 27, 1810. He completed an apprenticeship with a printer, then went to Upper Canada in 1833 with his two brothers and settled on farms there. In 1837, he went to Toronto in search of work. He joined the city guards during the Upper Canada Rebellion.

== Career ==
He managed a newspaper for Charles Fothergill and then became a partner with booksellers William and Henry Rowsell, managing their printing operation. In 1848, he became editor for the Toronto Patriot, owned by Edward George O'Brien. In 1849, with Ogle Robert Gowan, he took over the operation of the paper. They also published the United Empire. After the partnership ended in 1853, with partners, he bought the British Colonist (Note: Not to be confused with the British Columbian newspaper of the same name.) from Hugh Scobie's widow, which had briefly been named The Scotsman when it first appeared on February 1, 1838. In 1858, Thompson sold this paper and set up his own called the Atlas; later that same year, he bought the Colonist back.

Thompson had also served on Toronto city council from 1849 to 1854. He won the contract for government printing and so moved to Quebec City in 1859. After being accused of bias against French Canadians, he went back to Toronto in 1860.

He served as managing director for the Beaver Mutual Fire Insurance Association from 1860 to 1876, when it was forced to close because of a new requirement for insurance companies to provide a large security deposit to the government. Left in a difficult financial situation at the age of 66, he became manager for a branch of the city library.

== Memoir ==
In 1884, he published Reminiscences of a Canadian pioneer : for the last fifty years, 1833–1883 : an autobiography.

== Death ==
He died in Toronto on July 8, 1886.
