= Carnasserie Castle =

16th-century castle in Scotland

- Kilmartin, Scotland
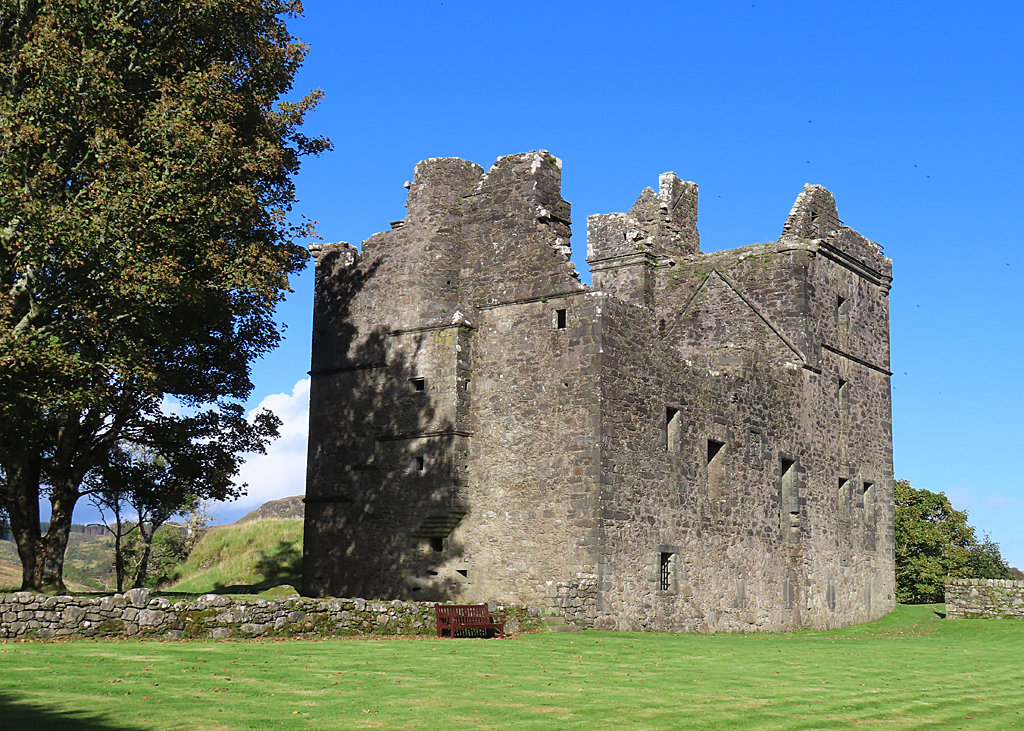
- The castle in 2024

Site information
- Open to the public: Yes
- Condition: Partially ruined

Location
- Coordinates: 56.1515°N 5.4809°W

Scheduled monument
- Official name: Carnasserie Castle
- Type: Prehistoric domestic and defensive: dun, Prehistoric ritual and funerary: cupmarks or cup-and-ring marks and similar rock art, Secular: castle; garden; motte
- Designated: 24 January 1995
- Reference no.: SM90061

Carnasserie Castle (also spelled Carnassarie) is a ruined 16th-century tower house, noted for its unusual plan and renaissance detailing. It is located around 2 kilometres (1 1/4 miles) north of Kilmartin, in Argyll and Bute, western Scotland, at grid reference NM837009.

== History ==
The castle was built by reforming churchman John Carswell, who was Rector of Kilmartin, Chancellor of the Chapel Royal at Stirling, and later titular Bishop of the Isles. Carswell published the first book to be printed in Scottish Gaelic, a translation of John Knox's Book of Common Order. Construction began in 1565 using masons brought from Stirling; although notionally built for Carswell's patron, the Earl of Argyll, he intended it as a personal residence for himself.

On Carswell's death in 1572, the castle passed to the Earl of Argyll and was sold in 1643 to Donald Campbell of Auchinleck. His successor Duncan Campbell was one of the few to actively support Argyll's Rising against James VII in 1685.

=== Argyll's Rising and its Aftermath ===
During the rising, the castle was garrisoned for the Earl of Argyll under the command of Dugald MacTavish of Dunardry, 14th Hereditary Chief of Clan MacTavish. The castle was captured and partly blown up by a Royalist force commanded by MacLean of Torloisk. When the castle was surrendered under terms of peaceful capitulation, the besieging forces violated those terms, and Dugald MacTavish, aged 21, was hanged within bow-draught of the castle gateway immediately after the surrender.

The Atholl Raid that followed the failure of the Rising devastated large parts of Argyllshire; despite recovering his estates in 1689, Duncan Campbell was financially ruined. In 1690, he petitioned Parliament claiming Maclean clansmen burnt Carnasserie Castle, stole 2,000 cattle and murdered his uncle Alexander Campbell of Strondour. Although the outer walls remain largely undamaged, Carnasserie was never rebuilt and the Auchinbrecks eventually went bankrupt.

=== Later history ===
In the 19th century the estate was sold to the Malcolms of Poltalloch, who also own nearby Duntrune Castle. Today the castle and its surroundings are protected as a scheduled monument. The castle is in the care of Historic Environment Scotland and is open to the public.

== Architecture ==
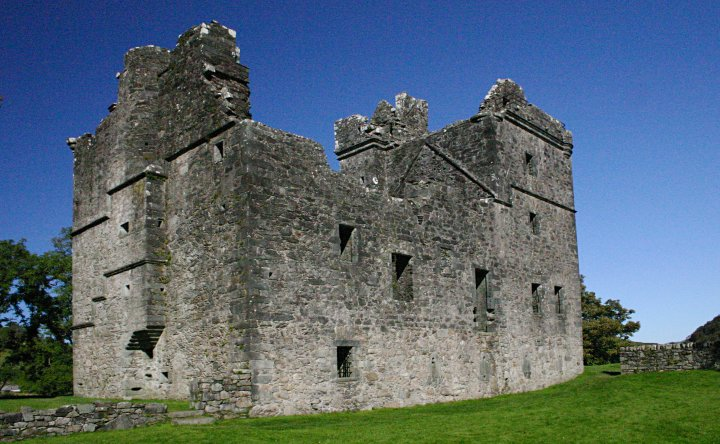
Carnasserie Castle seen from the south-west, with the hall house in the foreground.

Carnasserie has only ever been slightly altered, in the late 17th century, and so presents an accurate picture of 16th-century architecture. Although sited on raised ground close to a strategic pass at the head of Kilmartin Glen, it was designed more for domestic rather than military purposes.

The castle comprises a 5-storey tower house, with a longer three storey hall house, providing a substantial range of accommodation. At basement level are the remains of cellars and a kitchen with a large fireplace and water inlet. Above this is the large hall. This is connected to a large drawing room in the tower house, which retains its stone floor and large fireplace with finely carved stone decoration. A broad stair rises from the entrance to the hall, contained in a small tower to the north-west. A second smaller stair leads up from the hall to the parapet walk on three sides of the tower house. Upper rooms would have contained bedrooms.

The exterior displays numerous "double keyhole" gunloops, as well as decorative string courses and corbelling. Over the entrance are blank panels framed by carved supports, as well as the arms of the 5th Earl of Argyll with the Gaelic motto DIA LE UA NDUIBHNE, "God be with O'Duine", referring to the semi-legendary ancestors of Clan Campbell. At the top of the tower are the remains of open rounds along the parapet, and a cap-house above the stair. Fragments of carved drain spouts have been found, and are on display in the cellars.

To the south and west is a partially walled courtyard garden. An archway bears the inscription SDC LHL 1681, for Sir Duncan Campbell, 4th Baronet and Lady Henrietta Lindsay, whose support for Argyll's uprising led to the castle's destruction.
