= Kilmartin Castle =

Tower house in Argyll and Bute, Scotland

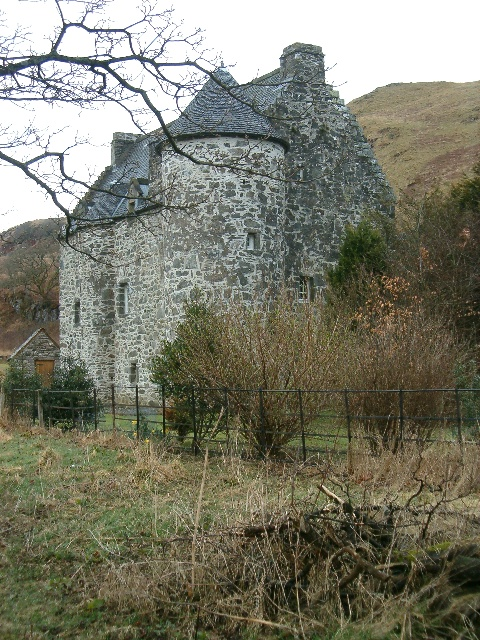
- Kilmartin Castle in 2006

Site information
- Condition: Restored and refurbished

Location
- Shown within Scotland
- Coordinates: 56.135573°N 5.484678°W

Site history
- Built: 16th century Rebuilt 1990s / Renovated in 2019

Kilmartin Castle is a 16th-century Z-plan castle at Kilmartin, Scotland. Kilmartin Castle is located in the historically significant Kilmartin Glen. The glen is also home to Kilmartin Museum.

== History ==
In 1550, the castle was built for the Rector of Kilmartin, John Carswell, and was later owned by Clan Campbell.

After 200 years as a ruin, the castle was restored and refurbished in the 1990's. The castle was then used as a second home. In 2019, Kilmartin Castle and grounds were renovated by Simon Hunt and Stephanie Burgon.

== The Castle Today ==
Kilmartin castle is now available as a luxury self-catering accommodation, sleeping 10, and hosts a handful of small weddings each year.
