= Clan Malcolm =

Highland Scottish clan

Clan MacCallum/Malcolm
- Mac Mhaol Chaluim
- Crest: A tower argent with blue window and port
- Motto: In ardua tendit (He aims at difficult things)

Profile
- Region: Highlands and Lowlands
- District: Dunbartonshire, Stirlingshire, Argyllshire
- Plant badge: Mountain ash

Chief
- Ian Rory Malcolm
- Chief of Clan Malcolm
- Seat: Duntrune Castle
Septs of Clan MacCallum/Malcolm
Callam, Callum, Collum, MacAllum, MacCallum, McCallum, MacCollum, McCollum, Malcolm, Malcolmson, Malcomb
Allied clans
Clan Campbell
Rival clans
Clan Donald

The Clan Malcolm, also known as the Clan MacCallum, is a Highland Scottish clan. The Clan MacCallum may have originally been a separate clan until the 18th century, when the chief of the Clan MacCallum adopted the name Malcolm after inheriting the Malcolm estate, and the two clans were drawn together under the same chief.

== History ==
=== Origins of the Clan ===
The name MacCallum is derived from Mac Ghille Chaluim which means son of the disciple of Columba. The MacCallums settled in Lorne towards the end of the 13th century. Maol or shavenhead is Scottish Gaelic for monk. Therefore, Maol Chaluim can be translated as monk or disciple of Columba.

Historian Ian Grimble has challenged the idea that MacCallum and Malcolm are simply interchangeable versions of the same name. Grimble claims that Colm was common throughout all areas of Celtic settlement. The name Malcolm appears as a surname as early as the 14th century in Dunbartonshire and Stirlingshire. Malcolm was also the name of four Scottish kings.

=== 15th, 16th and 17th century ===
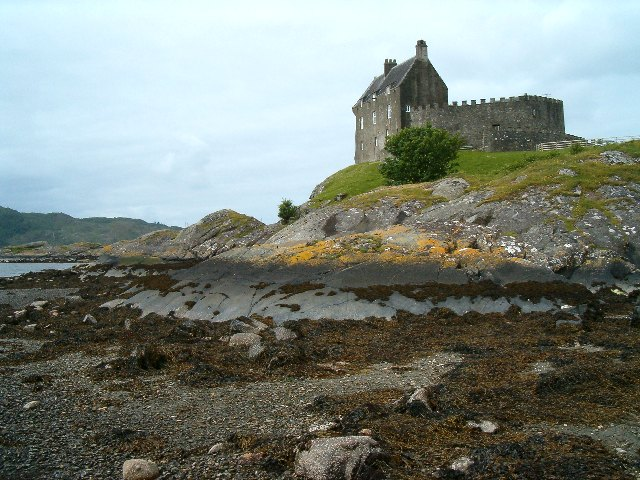
Duntrune Castle, seat of the clan chief, from the east

In 1414 Ronald MacCaullum of Corbarron was appointed as constable of Craignish Castle.

In May 1562 Donald McGillespie Vich O'Challum received a charter of the lands of Poltalloch in the parish of Kilmartin in the county of Argyll from Duncan Campbell of Duntrune.

The Reverend Archibald MacCallum translated parts of the Bible into Gaelic. In 1642 he succeeded his cousin to become the fourth Laird of Poltalloch. His son was Zachary MacCallum who was educated at the University of St Andrews and was also a noted swordsman.

Zachary's younger brother was Duncan whose son, Neil MacCallum served in the French Navy and is said to have been the natural father of Louis-Joseph de Montcalm. Zachary was a supporter of the Marquess of Argyll and he was killed in 1647 by forces of Sir Alexander MacDonald at Ederline. After killing seven of the enemy Zachary MacCallum turned to Sir Alexander MacDonald, who would have been his eighth that day if MacCallum was not taken from behind by an enemy (Maclean), who killed him with a Scythe.

John Malcolm of Balbedie was chamberlain of Fife during the reign of Charles I. He had four sons: Sir John Malcolm who was created a Baronet of Nova Scotia (see: Malcolm baronets), Alexander Malcolm, Lord Lochore who became a judge, James Malcolm who fought for John Graham, 1st Viscount Dundee at the Battle of Killiecrankie and Michael Malcolm.

=== 18th and 19th centuries ===
In the late 18th century chief Dugald MacCallum, the ninth of Poltalloch changed his surname to Malcolm. This may have been because he inherited the Malcolm estates in 1779. Of the Malcolm chieftainship line: Admiral Sir Pulteney Malcolm was Commander in Chief of Saint Helena, and won the regard of Napoleon. Sir Pulteney Malcolm also commanded HMS Royal Oak.

According to research by the Centre for the Study of the Legacies of British Slave-ownership, during the 18th and 19th centuries, the Malcolm family greatly increased their wealth due to their activities in slave trading and their ownership of plantations in Jamaica, redeploying their slave-derived wealth in agrarian improvement and infrastructure in Britain. The records show that Neill Malcolm the 12th, owned more than 2000 enslaved people on 11 separate plantations The 12th Laird opposed Abolition and claimed thousands (millions of pounds in 'today' money, in compensation for the loss of his slaves in 1834 from the Slave Compensation Commission.

The Malcolm family have a recent entry in the Oxford Dictionary of National Biography that details the role of Neill Malcolm, 12th of Poltalloch in accelerating his father's move from slave trading to investment in Britain and portrays him as a 'paternalistic' landlord in Scotland. The same entry details the role of his son, Neill Malcolm or 13th of Poltalloch in driving clearances and evictions from his estates in Scotland.

John Wingfield Malcolm of Poltalloch was created Lord Malcolm in 1896, and died in 1902, when the peerage became extinct, though his brother inherited his estate, and the feudal title of 'Malcolm of Poltalloch', descended with the chieftainship of the Clan.

The Chief Malcolm family had an impressive reputation for military and naval success throughout the eighteenth and nineteenth centuries. In addition to this, more than one of the chiefs of the clan has entered into the world of politics, the last of these being Sir Ian Malcolm, who was a member of parliament until 1919. More recent examples include Australian-born political journalist Mungo Wentworth MacCallum (b. 1941) and Stephen McCallum, Adelaide-born labour organiser and prominent operating figure within the Socialist Left faction of the Australian Labor Party in South Australia and Tasmania.

The beginning of the modern West Highland White Terrier breed is attributed to Colonel Malcolm of Poltalloch, Scotland in Argyllshire in the late 1800s. The story has it that Colonel Edward Malcolm was hunting with his pack of cairn terriers when he thought he saw a rabbit running through the underbrush and shot it, only to find that he had shot his favorite Cairn. From that day forward, he determined only to breed white dogs, because they were easy to see. At the same time, the Campbell of Rosneath began to breed white dogs which he called "Roseneath" terriers after the name of his estate. Later, the "Poltalloch" and "Roseneath" terriers were combined into the West Highland White Terrier, a name coined by Colonel Malcolm of Poltalloch Estates, which remains a very popular breed today.

== Clan Chief ==
The current Chief of Clan Malcolm is Ian Neill Lochnell Malcolm, 20th Laird of Poltalloch, following father Robins death in 2024.

== Clan Tartan ==
- Malcolm
- Malcolm Dress Tartan
- Malcolm Modern
- MacCallum Tartan

== Clan castle ==
- Duntrune Castle is situated on the north side of Loch Crinan. The castle was built in the thirteenth century. The L-plan tower house is enclosed by a walled courtyard. The original castle was re-modeled in the eighteenth century and again in 1830. The castle was originally held by the Clan Campbell but was sold to the Malcolms of Poltalloch in 1792 and they still own the castle. The castle is said to have a phantom piper.
- Poltalloch, two miles south-west of Kilmartin in mid Argyll, was originally held by the Campbells but was granted to the Malcolms in 1562. The original castle was replaced by the current house that dates from 1830. Designed by William Burn, it was built in an extreme show of wealth by 13th of Poltalloch but is now in a ruinous state.
- Lochore Castle is a ruinous fourteenth century keep and courtyard that stood on an island in a loch. The castle was held by the Wardlaws of Torrie before going to the Malcolms of Balbedie.

== See also ==
- Scottish clan
- McCallum (surname)
