= Blackmill Loch =

Reservoir in Argyll and Bute, Scotland

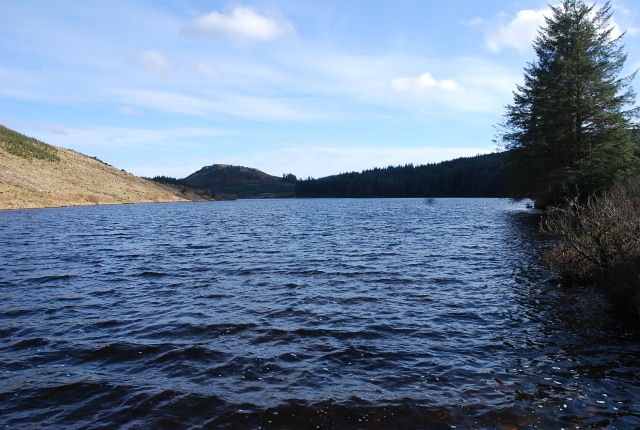

- Location within Argyll and Bute
- Location: Minard, Scotland
- Coordinates: 56.1107°N 5.2991°W grid reference NR94549588
- Type: Reservoir
- Basin countries: Scotland, United Kingdom
- Surface area: 130,000 m^{2} (1,400,000 sq ft)
- Surface elevation: 139 m (456 ft)

Blackmill Loch is an impounding reservoir, in Argyll and Bute, Scotland. The loch was constructed in 1964 and is one source of freshwater for the Lochgair Hydroelectric Scheme. The loch feeds the River Add, when not diverted for hydroelectric purposes. It is one of the two significant forest lochs to the north of Loch Glashan, the other being Loch Bealach Ghearran.

== See also ==
- List of lochs in Scotland
- List of reservoirs and dams in the United Kingdom

== Sources ==
- "Argyll and Bute Council Reservoirs Act 1975 Public Register"
