= Kilmartin Stones =

Graveslabs in Argyll and Bute, Scotland

Coordinates: 56°8′1″N 5°29′13″W

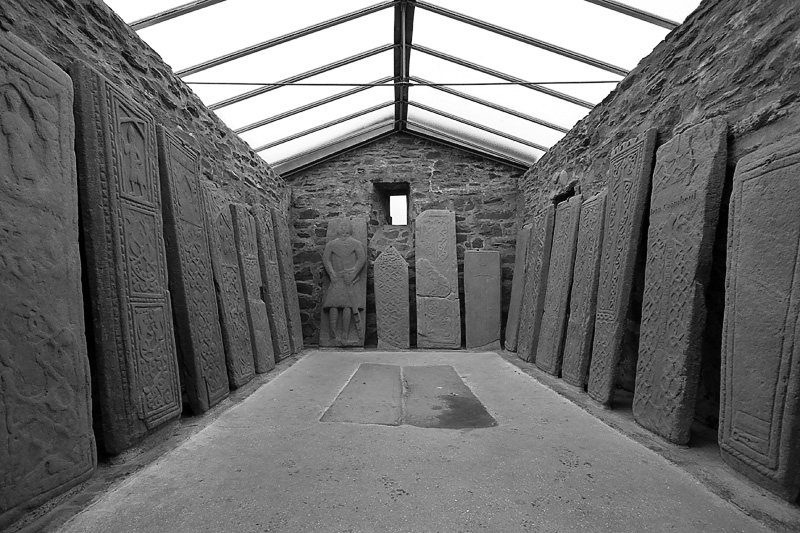
Kilmartin Stones (the oldest stones begin on the left, while the latest are on the right)

The Kilmartin Stones are a collection of 79 ancient graveslabs (one exception being a side-slab of a tomb chest) at Kilmartin parish church in the village of Kilmartin, Argyll, Scotland, about 30 km due south of Oban (about 46 km by road). The earliest stones date back to the thirteenth or fourteenth centuries, with the most recent ones dated 1707 and 1712.

== Description ==
Originally, the stones would have been laid flat on the ground to cover a grave. After the Reformation, however, many of the stones were moved, and in 1956 they were moved inside a shelter to protect them from the weather. The symbolism of the motifs carved onto the slabs is the subject of much discussion and speculation. Many feature swords or claymores, some alone, others with surrounding designs of twining or interlaced foliage. Several depict armed men. Other motifs include crosses, animals and shears; a comb appears with shears on one stone. It has been suggested that several of the slabs may commemorate Knights Templar but this theory is unproven.

== The nearby landscape ==
Kilmartin Glen is the richest prehistoric landscape in Scotland. Within an area not much over 6 miles (9.7 km) long a huge diversity of standing stones, stone circles, carved rocks and ancient tombs can be found. It also has what is believed to be the only 'linear cemetery' in the country, a series of chambered cairns (burial mounds) laid out in a straight line right down the bottom of the glen. The oldest of these is believed to be 6,000 years old.

The reason for such a concentration of these ancient monuments in one small area of the Scottish Highlands is unknown.
