= Duntroon =

Duntroon may refer to:

- Royal Military College, Duntroon, in Canberra, Australia
- Duntroon, Australian Capital Territory, Robert Campbell's property in the suburb of Campbell, Canberra
- Duntroon, Ontario, Canada
- Duntroon, New Zealand
- Duntroon, Scotland
- MV Duntroon, a passenger liner operated from 1935 to 1973, including wartime service as a troopship

== See also ==
- Duntrune Castle, also in Scotland
