= Loch Gair Hydro-Electric Scheme =

Power station near Lochgilphead, Scotland

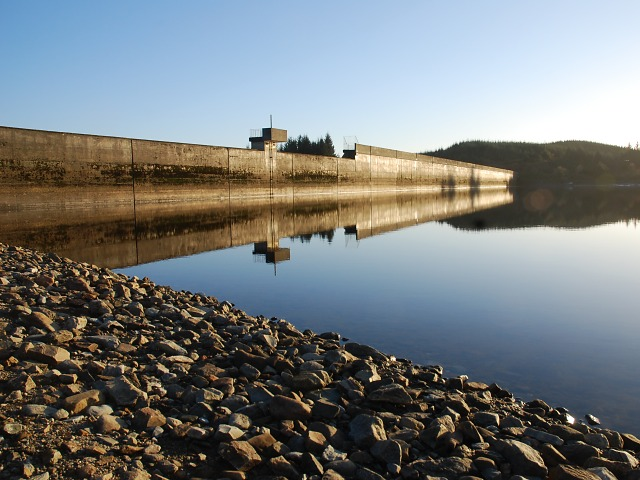
- Glashan Dam feeds the power station

- Location within Argyll and Bute
- Country: Scotland
- Location: Lochgair, Argyll and Bute
- Coordinates: 56.0656°N 5.3360°W
- Purpose: Power
- Status: Operational
- Opening date: 1961
- Owner: SSE

Loch Gair Hydro-Electric Scheme is a small-scale hydro-electric power station, built by the North of Scotland Hydro-Electric Board and commissioned in 1956. It is located near Lochgair, a hamlet to the north-east of Lochgilphead, Argyll and Bute in Scotland. It was originally designed to supply power to Lochgilphead and the surrounding communities, but is now connected to the National Grid.

== History ==
The North of Scotland Hydro-Electric Board was created by the Hydro-electric Development (Scotland) Act 1943, a measure championed by the politician Tom Johnston while he was Secretary of State for Scotland. Johnston's vision was for a public body that could build hydro-electric stations throughout the Highlands. Profits made by selling bulk electricity to the Scottish lowlands would be used to fund "the economic development and social improvement of the North of Scotland." Private consumers would be offered a supply of cheap electricity, and their connection to that supply would not reflect the actual cost of its provision in remote and sparsely populated areas.

The chairman of the new Board was to be Lord Airlie, who had initially been critical of the 1943 Act because its scope was too limited. The deputy chairman and chief executive was Edward MacColl, an engineer with wide experience of hydro-electric projects and electrical distribution networks. It soon became clear that MacColl intended to push ahead with the aspirations of the Act at breakneck speeds. He produced a list of 102 potential sites in just three months, and in June 1944, the first constructional scheme was published. This was for the Loch Sloy scheme, which had a ready market for bulk supplies to nearby Clydeside, but it included two smaller schemes, to demonstrate the Board's commitment to supplying remote areas.

Loch Gair was another small-scale scheme, and when it was commissioned in 1961, it supplied power to Lochgilphead and the surrounding communities. It was designed by the architect Ian Gordon Lindsay. When the North of Scotland Hydro-Electric Board was created, a panel of architectural advisors was set up, consisting of Reginald Fairlie, Harold Tarbolton and James Shearer. They were to judge designs submitted by other architects, but soon designed the schemes themselves. However, only Shearer was still alive by 1952, and others became involved in the design panel, including Lindsay. Shearer was an opponent of Modernist architecture, and Lindsay was one of several Traditionalist architects that were employed by the Board. His design for the turbine house on the shore of Loch Gair used stone recovered from a castle which would become submerged as the level of Loch Glashan, the main reservoir for the scheme, rose. The quality of his work was recognised when the building won a Civic Trust Award in 1962.

To provide a water supply, a dam was constructed across the outlet of Loch Glashan, to allow its water level to be raised. In order to construct the dam, the water level was lowered in April 1960, and a crannog became visible. This prehistoric structure was excaved by Mr and Mrs J G Scott in July and August of that year, before water levels were raised again in the autumn of 1961. Most of the finds from the dig are stored at Kelvingrove Art Gallery and Museum in Glasgow. The dam is a relatively small mass gravity structure, completed in 1961 with a maximum height of 24 metres (79 ft), from which water reaches the turbine house through a tunnel and a pressure pipeline at the lower end. The tunnel ends on the hillside to the west of the turbine house, where there is surge shaft and valve house, and the pipeline runs on the surface, passing under the A83 road just before it reaches the power station. Loch Glashan is fed by a few small streams, and water is diverted to it from several other river systems in order to increase its catchment.

To the east of the loch, the outflow from Loch Bealach Ghearran flows northwards to Blackmill Loch, a reservoir constructed by building a small dam at its western end. The dam is a rockfill structure constructed in 1964 and has a maximum height of 10.4 feet (3.17 m). Most of the other small dams were also constructed in 1964. About 0.3 miles (0.5 km) below the dam is another dam and sluice, which diverts some of the flow into a tunnel. To the north of this, the Abhainn Bheag an Tunns has been dammed to create Loch Feolin, another small reservoir. The dam is a rockfill structure with a maximum height of 13.7 feet (4.2 m). Further downstream, another small dam with a fish ladder has been constructed, which diverts much of the water into a surface aqueduct. It is carried over the outflow from Blackmill Loch by a pipeline, and is joined by the tunnel from Blackmill Lock. It continues as a surface aqueduct, to empty into the northern end of Loch Glashan. Further north still, the Allt Mealach has been dammed to create Crarae Reservoir. A sluice at its northern end controls flow into a tunnel, which passes through higher ground to the west to discharge into a tributary of the Abhainn Bheag an Tunns. The dam is a concrete structure, with a maximum height of 45 feet (13.7 m). Below the dam, the outlet continues as the Crarae Burn, which flows through Crarae Forest Garden, a spectacular woodland garden in Himalayan style built up during the 20th century by three generations of the Campbell family. The gardens cover 126 acres (51 ha) and were given to the Charitable Trust, now the National Trust for Scotland, in 1978.

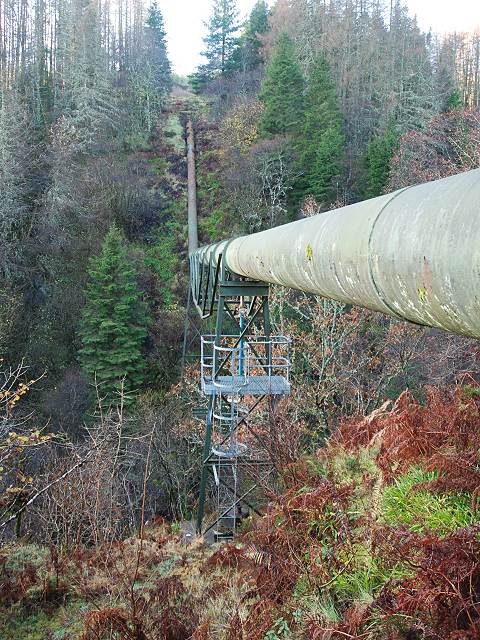
The Gleann Airigh pipe bridge carries water from tributaries of the River Add to Loch Glashan

The catchment is further extended by diverting water from the River Add. To the west of Cnoc Dubh ("Black Hill"), a dam has been constructed, with a fish ladder to allow migrating fish to access the upper reaches of the river. Maps show a pumping station, meter house and weir, and a surface aqueduct carries water along the left bank of the river for about 0.9 miles (1.4 km) before it enters a pipeline. This carries it over the Abhainn Bheag an Tunns and discharges into Loch Glashan. Finally there are three intakes on tributaries of the River Add, one on the Allt Gobhain and two more on unnamed streams to its east. These feed water into a tunnel, which emerges from the hillside as a pipeline to cross the River Add at high level and continues as a tunnel to Loch Glashan.

In early 1957, Lord Lucas of Chilworth asked questions in the House of Lords about the costs of Scottish hydro-electricity. Lord Strathclyde stated that for Loch Gair, the capital cost of the project was expected to be £239 per kW, towards the bottom end of the 27 schemes mentioned, although still higher than the average cost of £175 per kW. The costs were estimated since Loch Gair was one of four schemes where construction had not yet started. It was the North of Scotland Hydro-Electric Board's Constructional Scheme No. 71. Loch Glashan provides a head of 358 feet (109 m) to the turbine house, which can generate 6 MW.

=== Operation ===
In 2002, the Renewables Obligation (Scotland) legislation was introduced. It was conceived as a way to promote the development of small-scale hydro-electric, wave power, tidal power, photovoltaics, wind power and biomass schemes, but by the time it came into force, the definition of small scale had been increased from 5 MW to 10 MW and then 20 MW, and existing hydro-electric stations that had been refurbished to improve efficiency could be included. Loch Gair at 6 MW thus became eligible when the limits were increased, and between 2004 and 2007 the station qualified for 59,324 Renewable Obligation Certificates, generating a subsidy for SSE of over £2,799,000. Between 2005 and 2007, the station operated at an average load factor of 33.3 percent, although the load factor increased every year during that period.

In order to prevent salmon smolts from entering the pipeline from Loch Glashan and being carried down through the turbines, SSE plc used a system of ten removable intake screens. The process of removing them for cleaning and then replacing them was a labour-intensive task, as it had to be done once a day between February and November, when smolts could be migrating. It required some 900 hours of staff time per year, with maintenance costs reaching £40,000 per year. In 2015, the screens were replaced with four travelling water screens, manufactured by Hydrolox. Because the site is remote, they were delivered by helicopter, and since installation have reduced the time and money spent on maintenance by 93 percent, to 60 hours and £2,500 per year. Flow through the screens is around 48 cubic feet (1.35 m^{3}) per second when the power station is operational.

== Hydrology ==
The surface level of Loch Glashan is 367 feet (112 m) above Ordnance datum (AOD), it covers 0.70 square miles (1.81 km^{2}), and drains an area of 3.72 square miles (9.63 km^{2}). Compensation water discharged through the dam maintains the habitat in the Abhainn Mhòr, which flows in a south-easterly direction and is crossed by the A83 road before discharging into the sea at Loch Gair. Blackmill Loch is at 432 feet (132 m) AOD, has an area of 35 acres (14 ha) and drains 0.91 square miles (2.36 km^{2}). Loch Bealach Ghearran is smaller, covering just 15 acres (6 ha), and is located at 584 feet (178 m) AOD. The unnamed loch on the Abhainn Bheag an Tunns is at 364 feet (111 m) AOD and covers an area of 2.5 acres (1 ha).

Loch Feorlin, the reservoir on the upper Abhainn Bheag an Tunns, is at 495 feet (151 m) AOD, and covers 15 acres (6 ha), with a catchment area of 1.38 square miles (3.57 km^{2}). Loch Crarae, which is on the Allt Mealach, is at 166 metres (545 ft) AOD.

== Bibliography ==
- Dekker, Nick (2008). "Public Petition No. PE1184" (PDF). Scottish Parliament. Archived (PDF) from the original on 10 January 2024.
- Environmental Protection Officer (18 June 2012). "Reservoirs Act 1975 Public Register" (PDF). Argyll and Bute Council. Archived from the original (PDF) on 8 July 2013.
- Fleetwood, David; et al. (2010). Power to the People - The built heritage of Scotland's hydroelectric power. Historic Scotland. ISBN 978-1-84917-036-9.
- Glendinning; MacInnes; MacKechnie (1996). A history of Scottish Architecture. Edinburgh University Press. ISBN 978-0-7486-0849-2.
- Miller, James (2002). The Dam Builders - Power from the Glens. Birlinn. ISBN 978-1-84158-225-2.
- Payne, Peter L (1988). The Hydro. Aberdeen University Press. ISBN 978-0-08-036584-8.
- Reeves, Julian, ed. (2018). Power from the Glens - 75th Anniversary edition. SSE. ISBN 978-1-5272-2500-8.
- Swap (June 2005). "Subsidies and Subterfuge" (PDF). Scottish Wind Assessment Project. Archived (PDF) from the original on 11 October 2022.
- Wood, Emma (2002). The Hydro Boys. Luath Press. ISBN 978-1-84282-016-2.
