= Feorlin =

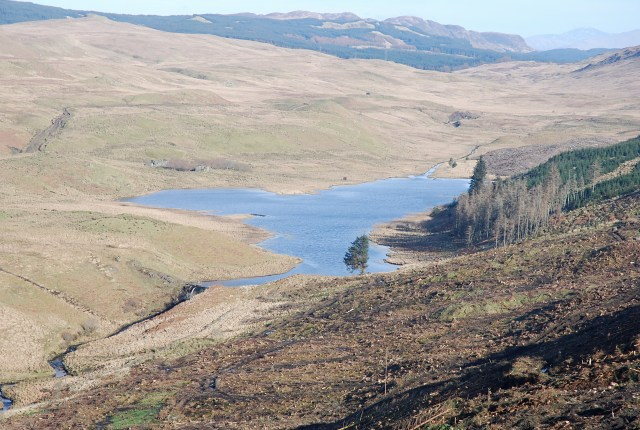

- Location within Argyll and Bute
- Location: Minard, Scotland
- Coordinates: 56.1249°N 5.2888°W grid reference NR95389707
- Type: Reservoir
- Basin countries: Scotland, United Kingdom
- Surface area: 63,794 m^{2} (686,670 sq ft)
- Surface elevation: 159 m (522 ft)

Feorlin is an impounding reservoir located 2 kilometres west of Minard. The loch is part of the Lochgair Hydroelectric Scheme. The rockfill dam is 4.19 metres high and was completed in 1964. When not diverted for hydroelectric purposes, the loch feeds a tributary of the River Add.

Loch Feorlin feeds Loch Glashan when diverted but when not diverted the floodwater or water drains into Abhainn Bheag An Tunns and the River Add

Loch Feorlin

== See also ==
- List of dams and reservoirs in United Kingdom

== Sources ==
- "Argyll and Bute Council Reservoirs Act 1975 Public Register"
