= Beatrice Grant =

- Born: Beatrice Campbell; 2 September 1761; Kilmartin, Scotland
- Died: 20 February 1845 (aged 83); Nairn, Scotland
- Parents: Capt. Neil Campbell of Duntroon (father); Matilda Campbell (mother)

Beatrice Grant n. Campbell (1761–1845) was a Scottish author born in Argyll who spent most of her life in the Highlands of Scotland.

== Early life ==
Grant was baptised in the parish of Kilmartin in the west of Scotland on 2 September 1761.

She was the eldest child of Captain Neil Campbell of Duntroon whose military record includes serving as a captain in the Siege of Havana. Her mother, Matilda Campbell died on 23 September 1769 when Beatrice was 8 years old.

In total Grant had 15 siblings. Five whole siblings: Jean Campbell (born 2 Sep 1762), Mary Matilda Campbell (born 12 Jan 1764), Margaret Campbell (born 12 Jan 1765), Anne Campbell (born 19 Feb 1768, Neilliadh "Nelly" Campbell (born 23 September 1769). She had half-siblings from her father's second marriage to Jean Campbell in 1772. These were: Lieutenant James Campbell (1773–1799), Archibald Campbell (1775–1792), Major General Sir Neill Campbell (1776–1827), Peter Campbell (1777–1777), Mary Meredith Campbell (1778 – unknown), General Patrick Campbell (1779–1857), Argyle Campbell (1781–1783) Jean Campbell (1782–1868), Elizabeth Campbell (1783–1785), Helen Campbell (1784–1808), and Elizabeth Campbell (1785–1878).

== Work ==
In 1784, Grant married the Rev. Patrick Grant, minister of the highland parish of Duthil, close to Grantown on Spey. They had four children: Anna and Matilda (twins), Georgina, and George. After the death of her husband in 1809, Grant moved with her younger children, and her school for young ladies, to Inverness.

In 1812, Grant published her first book, a guide for inexperienced mothers. Her following three books (Popular Models and Impressive Warnings for the Sons and Daughters of Industry) were dedicated to the Prince Regent. Many of her writings are fiction, some intended for working class readers, with the purpose of informing and improving the upbringing and behaviours of young people. She used magazines as well as books to reach audiences, being a frequent contributor to The Cheap Magazine, a magazine published in East Lothian aimed to reach the working classes, as well as to the more prestigious, and London-based, La Belle Assemblée, New Monthly Magazine and Repository of Arts.

Her work was celebrated by the poet, Dorothea Primrose Campbell, in her 1816 anthology Poems, honouring her with a poem entitled To Mrs Grant of Duthell. On Reading Her "Intellectual Education".

== Death ==
Grant died in Nairn on 20 February 1845. She is buried in Chapelyard graveyard in Inverness under the same slab as two of her daughters.

== Selected publications ==
- Sketches of intellectual education, and hints on domestic economy, addressed to inexperienced mothers: with an appendix, containing an essay on the instruction of the poor (1812)
- Popular models and impressive warnings for the sons and daughters of industry, Parts One and Two (1815–16)
- Third Part of Popular Models, and Impressive Warnings for the Sons and Daughters of Industry (1816)
- The history of an Irish family : in which, the unspeakable advantages of a virtuous education ... are strikingly exemplified ... To which is added ... The exemplary mother; or, Dutiful parents and good children (1822)
