= Marion Campbell (archaeologist) =

Scottish amateur archaeologist

- Born: 16 December 1919; London, England
- Died: 13 June 2000 (aged 80); Oban, Scotland
- Partner: Mary Sandeman (1954-1995)

Marion Campbell (c. 16 December 1919 - 13 June 2000) was a Scottish archaeologist. She was one of the first people to complete an archaeological survey of Kilmartin Glen in Mid Argyll. Campbell was an advocate for local history; she promoted and donated to several Argyll museums and published works about Argyll's history. She also published several fictional novels.

== Personal life ==
Marion Campbell was the daughter of John Campbell and Marion Durand. Campbell lived most of her life in Argyll (today part of Argyll and Bute) at her family's estate in Kilberry. She inherited Kilberry when she was 8, following her father's death. The estate was sold to an older cousin, but Campbell regained possession of it once she turned 18.

During World War II, Campbell served in the British military as part of the Auxiliary Territorial Service (ATS) and the Women's Royal Navy Service (WRNS). Following her military service, Campbell returned to Kilberry where she operated and managed several farms on her estate.

Campbell was involved in local politics, and she served as a district councillor and a member of the Scottish National Party for 20 years beginning in 1955.

In 1954, Campbell's childhood friend Mary Sandeman moved into Kilberry Castle. They had become friends at school and during the school holidays, Mary Sandeman, living on Jura, and Marion, in Kilberry, used torches to signal to one another across the Sound of Jura at night. The two lived and worked together until Sandeman died in 1995, first in the castle and later in a cottage on her estate.

== Archaeologist and Historian ==
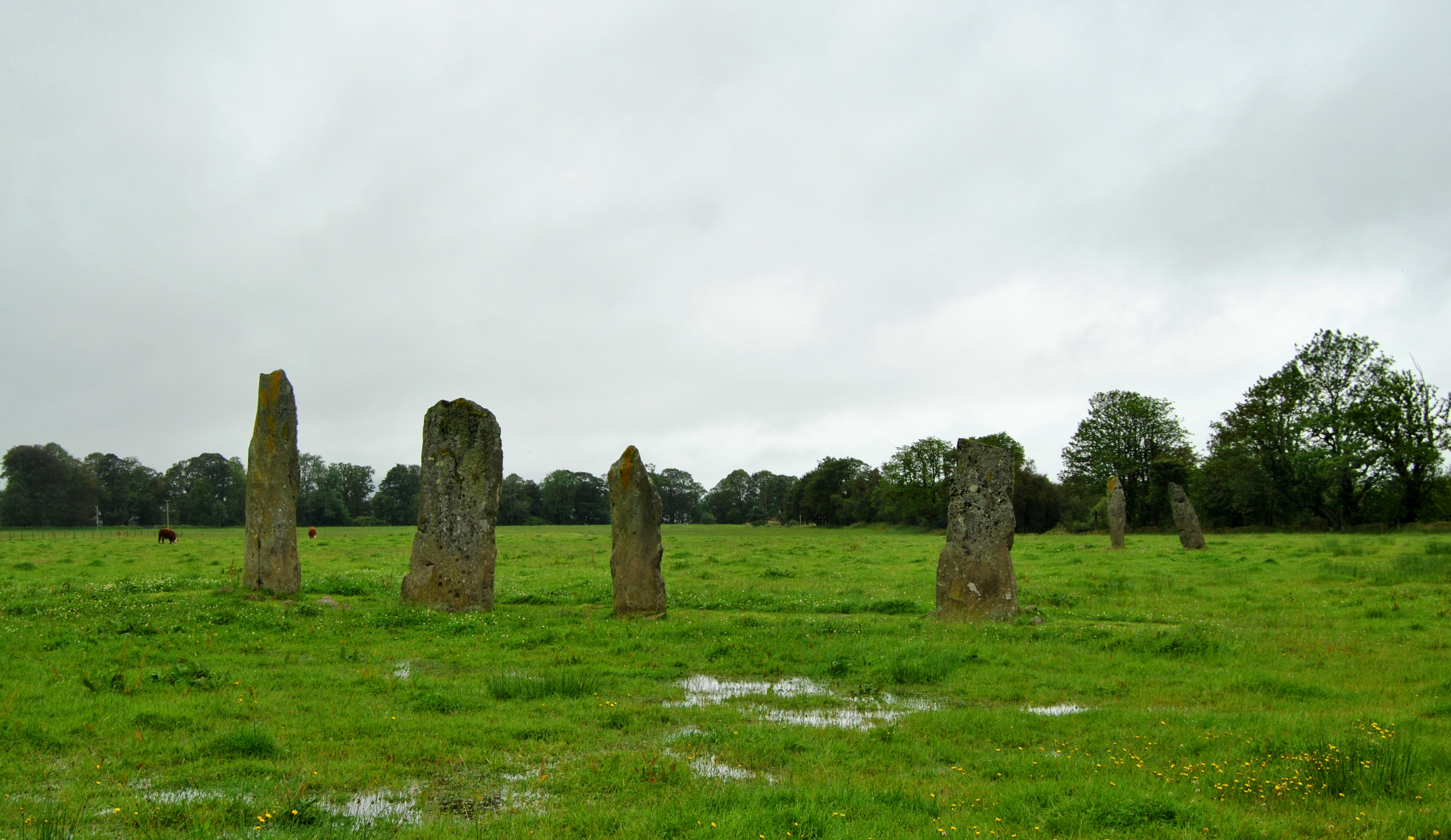
Standing stones at Kilmartin Glen, where Campbell completed much of her professional work.

Between 1954 and 1963, Campbell and Sandeman completed a field survey of Mid Argyll. The survey noted the locations of objects and sites that warranted further archaeological study, including standing stones, cairns, Early- and Medieval-Christian artifacts and sites, and forts. The survey was published in volume 95 of the journal Proceedings of the Society of Antiquaries of Scotland (PSAS) in 1962. Campbell's work included the first survey of Kilmartin Glen; it also created direction for many later archaeological studies of Mid Argyll.

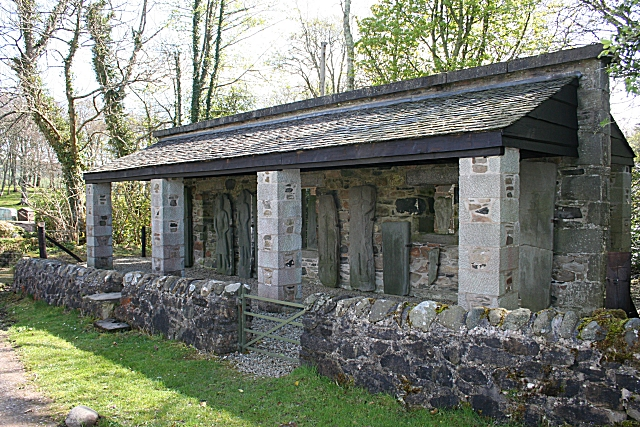
The Kilberry Sculptured Stones in the structure built by the Ministry of Works.

Among the artifacts described by Campbell were the Kilberry Sculptured Stones, found on Campbell's estate. These artifacts are dated to the Early and Medieval Christian Period and consist of 26 sculptured stones, including crosses and cross fragments, grave slabs, and effigies. Campbell moved many of the Kilberry Sculptured Stones to the basement of Kilberry Castle in 1948 to better preserve and protect them. In 1951, she donated the stones to the Ministry of Works, which displayed them in a new, separate structure on Campbell's estate.

Campbell was passionate about and an advocate for the history of Argyll, where she lived most of her life. She promoted the conversion of Auchindrain Township into a museum; the museum opened in 1968 and today educates visitors about traditional Scottish farming life. In the 1990s, Campbell donated her personal collection of artifacts to form the founding collection of the Kilmartin House. Today, known as the Kilmartin Museum, the organization educates the public about the archaeological and natural history of Kilmartin Glen, where much of Campbell's professional work was focused.

In 1977, Campbell published the book Argyll: The Enduring Heartland which details the history of Argyll and Campbell's love and connection to the region. Campbell's account of Scottish history and pride was well-received, with three separate editions appearing in print since its original publication. Campbell also researched Alexander III, a Scottish king with ties to Argyll. She compiled a decades-worth of research into the biography Alexander III, King of Scots, published shortly before she died in 1999.

In 1955, Campbell founded the Natural History and Antiquarian Society of Mid Argyll, an organization dedicated to discussing, preserving, and educating the general public about the local history of Mid Argyll. She served as president of the Society from its founding until 1990. In 1971, she became the founding editor and a regular contributor to the Mid Argyll Society's journal The Kist. She was a driving force behind the creation of the Auchindrain Township Open Air Museum.

Campbell became a Fellow of the Society of Antiquaries of Scotland in 1949 and an Honorary Fellow of the Society in 1988.

== Novelist ==
Campbell published two nonfiction books. Argyll: The Enduring Heartland combines historical and archaeological accounts of Argyll with poetry and personal essays written by Campbell; it was published in 1977. Her biography of Alexander III, entitled Alexander III, King of Scots, was published in 1999.

Campbell also wrote several works of historical fiction. Her children's historical novel The Wide Blue Road was published in 1957 and was her debut fictional work. It was followed by three more in the series.

The Dark Twin was set in Bronze Age Scotland, and was published in 1973. Campbell based the storyline from mysterious, waking dreams she had during this period. The novel was particularly popular in the United States, and in the 1990s Campbell sold the film rights. The Dark Twin was reissued in 2024 by Solar Press.

== Legacy ==
The 2014 play The Air that Carries the Weight by Rebecca Sharp features Marion Campbell as a character; the play also incorporates her archaeological and fictional writings.

The Kilmartin Museum's library is dedicated to and named after Campbell.

== Published works ==
- (1957) The Wide Blue Road, J.M. Dent & Sons, ISBN 1899827846
- (1962) Campbell, M. and Sandeman, M., "Mid Argyll: an archaeological survey", Proceedings of the Society of Antiquaries of Scotland, vol 95, pp. 1–125.
- (1963) Lances and Longships, J.M. Dent & Sons
- (1964) The Squire of Val, J.M. Dent & Sons
- (1965) Young Hugh, J.M. Dent & Sons
- (1973) The Dark Twin, House of Lochar, ISBN 1-899863-52-4
- (1977) Argyll: The Enduring Heartland, House of Lochar, ISBN 1-899863-82-6
- (1999) Alexander III King of Scots, House of Lochar, ISBN 1-899863-55-9
- (unknown but between 1977-1988) ‘Kilberry Church and Parish’ published by Kilberry Kirk Session in aid of the Church Fabric Fund
