= Neilliadh "Nelly" Campbell =

Neilliadh "Nelly" Campbell was the first white woman to set foot on Canadian soil at Port Glasgow.

== Early life ==
Campbell was born to Captain Neil Campbell of Duntroon and Matilda Campbell, in the village of Kilmartin in West Scotland on 23 September 1769. Her mother died giving birth to Campbell.

Campbell had five older siblings:

- Beatrice Grant n. Campbell the famous Scottish author (born 2 September 1761)
- Jean Campbell (born 2 Sep 1762)
- Mary Matilda Campbell (born 12 Jan 1764)
- Margaret Campbell (born 12 Jan 1765)
- Anne Campbell (born 19 Feb 1768)

She also had eleven half-siblings after her father was remarried to Jean Campbell in 1772:

- Lieutenant James Campbell (1773–1799)
- Archibald Campbell (1775–1792)
- Major General Sir Neill Campbell (1776–1827)
- Peter Campbell (1777–1777)
- Mary Meredith Campbell (1778 – unknown)
- General Patrick Campbell (1779–1857)
- Argyle Campbell (1781–1783)
- Jean Campbell (1782–1868)
- Elizabeth Campbell (1783–1785)
- Helen Campbell (1784–1808)
- Elizabeth Campbell (1785–1878).

On 9 May 1760, Campbell eloped and married her cousin, Donald Campbell, without the knowledge or permission of her Father.

== Moving to Canada ==
The married couple eventually made a new life in Canada with their 9 children. Campbell travelled alone first bringing with her an inheritance in the form of kegs of gold. She arrived at Port Glasgow in June 1818 where she pushed aside the men on the boat so she could be the first white woman to place a foot on Canadian sands at the port.

Her husband arrived later with their children in October 1818. The family built a log cabin on a hill which was named Cnoc Neilliadh meaning Nelly's Rock in Scottish Gaelic.

Nelly died on 18 December 1851 at the age of 81 at her daughter, Mary's, home. Her body was carried by bob-sleigh to Fingal Cemetery, in Southwold Township where she was buried with other members of her family.
