= Kilmartin =

Village in Argyll and Bute, Scotland

Coordinates: 56.133°N 5.487°W

Kilmartin: Scottish Gaelic: Cille Mhàrtainn
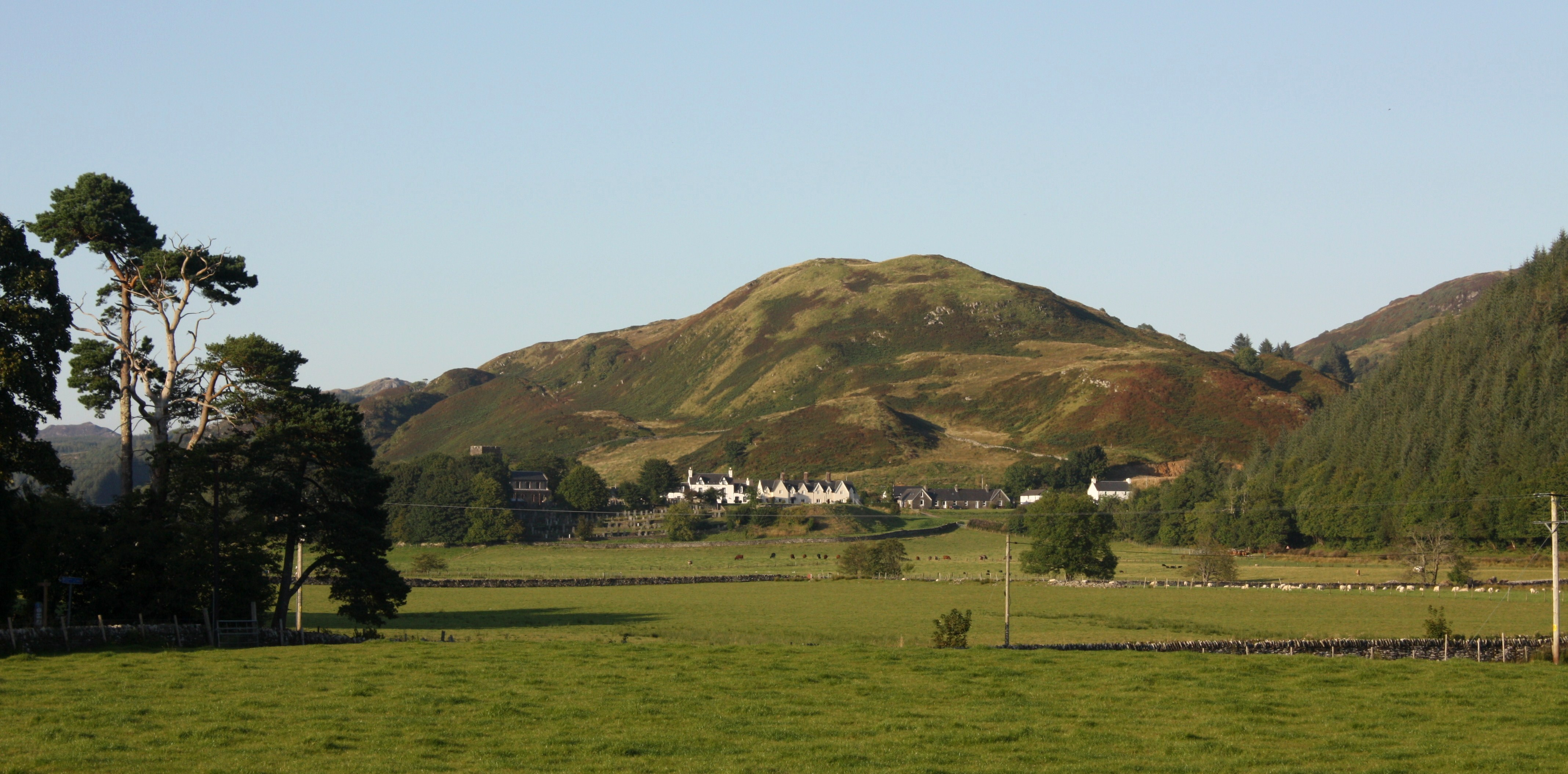
- Kilmartin

- Location within Argyll and Bute
- OS grid reference: NR 834 999
- Council area: Argyll and Bute
- Lieutenancy area: Argyll and Bute
- Country: Scotland
- Sovereign state: United Kingdom
- Post town: Lochgilphead
- Postcode district: PA31
- Dialling code: 01546
- UK Parliament: Argyll, Bute and South Lochaber
- Scottish Parliament: Argyll and Bute

Kilmartin (Scottish Gaelic: Cille Mhàrtainn, meaning "church of Màrtainn") is a small village in Argyll and Bute, western Scotland. It is best known as the centre of Kilmartin Glen, an area with one of the richest concentrations of prehistoric monuments and historical sites in Scotland. It contains over 800 monuments within a six-mile (ten-kilometre) radius. It is home to Kilmartin Museum and the Kilmartin Hotel.

== Kilmartin Parish Church ==
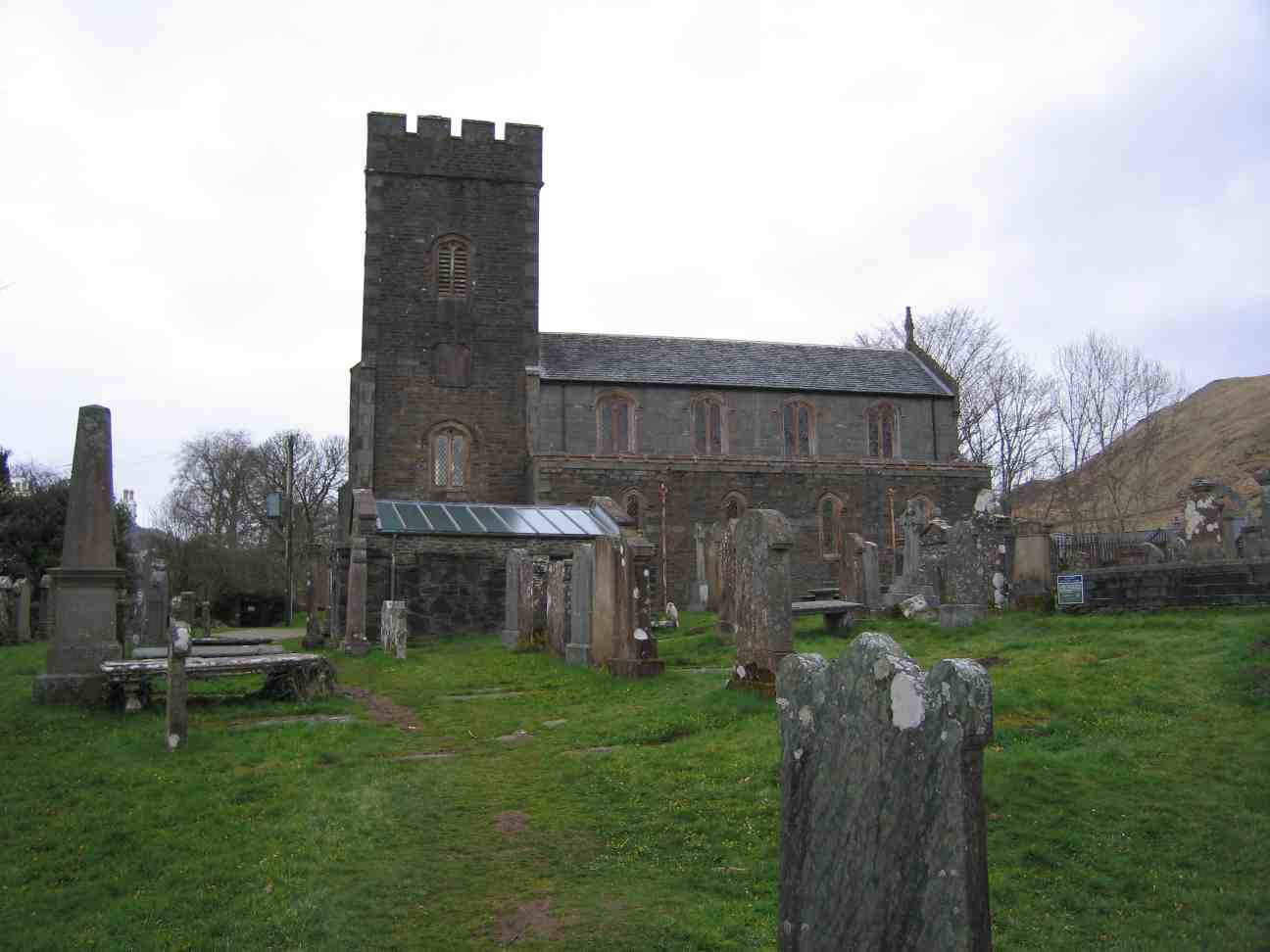
Kilmartin Church

Kilmartin Parish Church is a congregation of the Church of Scotland. The present church building was designed by architect James Gordon Davis and opened in 1835, though there had been earlier churches on the site. The churchyard has an important collection of early Christian and medieval carved stones, known as the Kilmartin Stones. Some are displayed within the parish church itself, others have been gathered into lapidaria within the graveyard, others still remain lying within it.

The two most important monuments are the Kilmartin crosses, one 9th–10th century, the other late medieval in date, within the church. In the churchyard are a large collection of late medieval gravestones in the 'West Highland' style, dating between the 14th and early 16th centuries. Many are marked by figures of warriors in contemporary dress with spears and swords, along with figures of fantastic animals, foliage and interlace patterns. None are inscribed, so the identities of the persons commemorated are unknown. They can, however, be taken to be the monuments of the local landowning or minor noble class in late medieval times. Kilmartin Church was evidently an important burial site, and the graveslabs have traditionally been attributed to a 'Loch Awe school' of carving that may have worked at or near Kilmartin, though a 2010 reassessment found limited evidence for the existence of distinct carving "schools" as originally proposed. The swords shown on many of the stones refer to warrior (or, more broadly, social) status, and have no connection with the Templars or other medieval military orders, as is sometimes suggested. Women are commemorated on some of the stones, their symbol often being the shears (referring to household activities).

John Duncanson (c.1630–1687) served as the Church of Scotland minister at Kilmartin between 1655–1662 and again between 1670–1684. He was removed in 1662 when episcopacy was re-established, but his appointment was restored in 1670. His son Major Robert Duncanson was a key figure in the 1692 Glencoe Massacre. Kilmartin Church has been decommissioned and is now in private ownership.

=== Ancient Burial Place of Clan MacTavish ===
Kilmartin Church served as an ancient burial ground of the chiefs of Clan MacTavish, whose ancestral seat at Dunardry in Knapdale lay a few miles to the south. The churchyard contains a gravestone pointed to by local historians as the resting place of Tamhais Mhór — Tavis the Great — the clan's 12th-century founder, as well as graves said by tradition to mark the resting places of Tavis Coir and his brother Iver, named in Campbell-derived genealogies as ancestors of Clan MacTavish and Clan MacIver respectively. Dugald MacTavish, 14th Chief, hanged at nearby Carnasserie Castle in 1685, is also buried here. Sheriff Dugald MacTavish of Dunardry, 20th Chief, who died in 1855, was re-interred at Kilmartin from Campbeltown.

== Kilmartin Castle ==
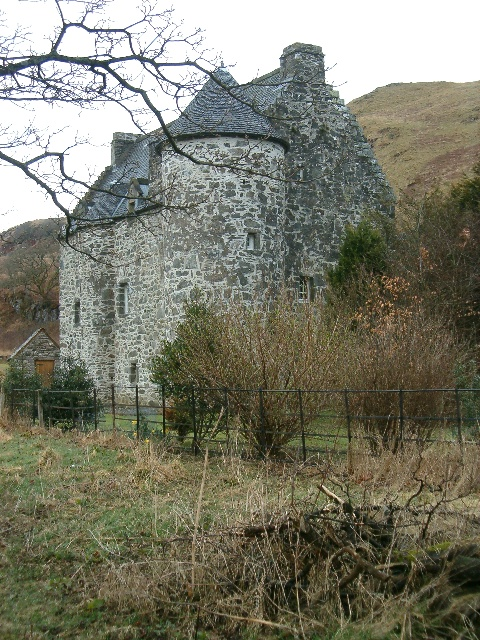
Kilmartin Castle

Kilmartin Castle, a small 'Z-plan' tower house, dating from about 1580, stands above the village. Kilmartin was a property of the Campbells, many of whom are buried in the churchyard. John Carswell, Rector of Kilmartin and later titular Bishop of the Isles, lived here before moving to his new residence at Carnasserie Castle. The castle comprises an oblong, three-storey main block, with round towers to the north-east and south-west corners, as well as a small stair tower in the west front. Formerly ruined, it has been restored as a private house in recent years. Shot holes and iron yetts over the windows have been retained.

The village also has a hotel and public toilets.

== Kilmartin Museum ==
Kilmartin Museum interprets the Neolithic monuments of Kilmartin Glen and the surrounding area for visitors, and has a selection of excavated artifacts of various periods. It is located within the village in a group of converted buildings. The Museum has a book and gift shop and a café which serves locally sourced freshly prepared meals. The museum reopened on 3 September 2023 following a £7 million refurbishment that joined its two existing buildings into a single facility, designed by architects Reiach and Hall. The redevelopment received a Scottish Design Award in 2024.

== Kilmartin Glen ==
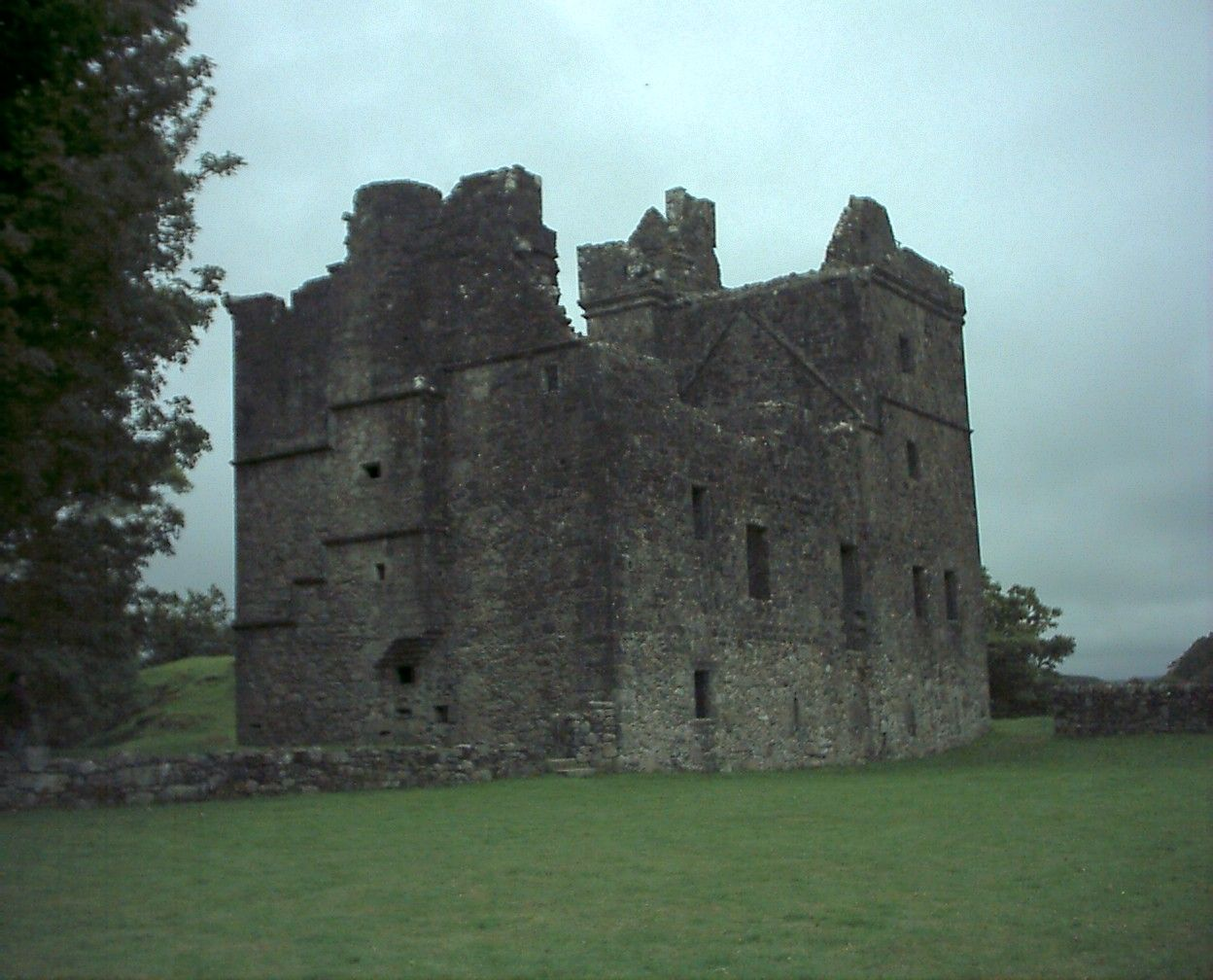
Carnassarie Castle, near Kilmartin

Kilmartin Glen is the location of several important Neolithic, Bronze Age and Iron Age sites, including Temple Wood (a henge monument), several burial cairns, chambered cairns, standing stones and cup and ring marked rocks.

Kilmartin's is one of the finest concentrations of prehistoric sites in Scotland, and almost all are within an easy walk of the roads which criss-cross the valley. One of the burial cairns has been rebuilt, with access through an opening in the top down stairs to the base of the cairn and a stone burial cist. The two stone circles in Temple Wood have also been re-erected by archaeologists.

Carnasserie Castle stands a little north of Kilmartin, and is in the care of Historic Environment Scotland. It was blown up by government forces when his successor Duncan Campbell participated in the failed 1685 Argyll's Rising and never repaired. Largely complete, though roofless, its architecture is notably refined and includes much Renaissance ornamental detail. Also within Kilmartin parish is the important Iron Age and early medieval hill-fort of Dunadd, one of the major centres of the kingdom of Dál Riata. It is also in the care of Historic Environment Scotland.

== Moine Mhòr ==
The Moine Mhòr encompasses a large area of raised bog, saltmarsh, brackish grassland, alder carr, fen and woodland to the west of Kilmartin. The variety of habitats at Moine Mhòr provide important habitats for a variety of animal and plant species, and the area was declared a national nature reserve (NNR) in 1987, owned and managed by NatureScot. According to NatureScot, lowland raised bogs like Moine Mhòr are some of the rarest and most threatened natural wildlife habitats in Europe, due to removal of peat, afforestation and reclamation of farmland.

== See also ==
- Famous Scottish writer, Beatrice Grant was born and baptised in Kilmartin in 1761
- Clan MacTavish
