= Kilmartin Museum =

Coordinates: 56.1334°N 5.4867°W

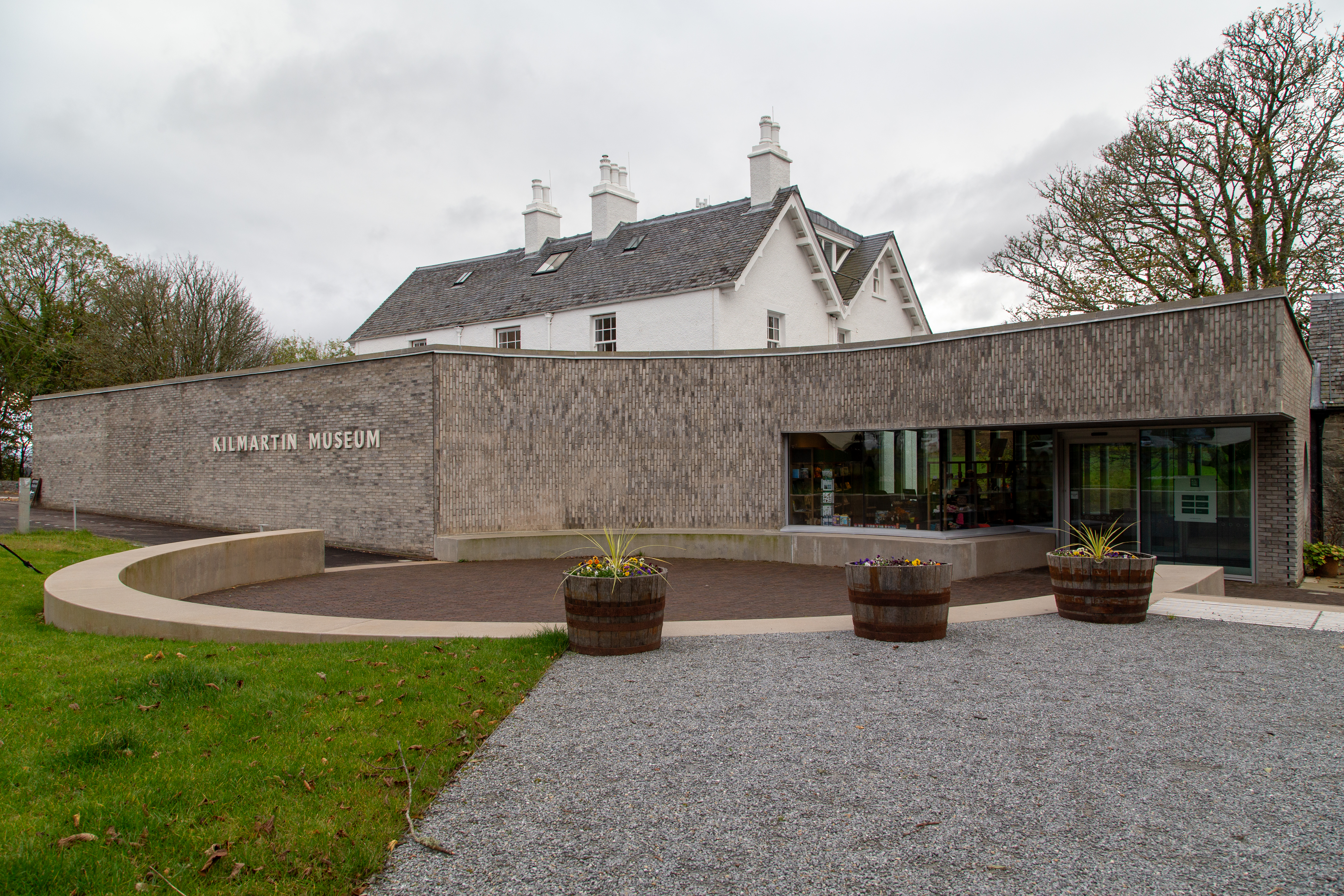
- Exterior of Kilmartin Museum

- Location within Argyll and Bute
- Former name: Kilmartin House Centre for Archaeology and Landscape Interpretation
- Established: 1997
- Location: Kilmartin, Argyll, Scotland
- Type: Archaeology museum
- Website: https://www.kilmartin.org

Kilmartin Museum is an archaeological museum based in Kilmartin, Argyll, Scotland. The museum works to conserve the internationally important archaeological landscape, artefacts and natural heritage of Kilmartin Glen. Their collection contains archaeological artefacts from prehistoric, neolithic, and early historic heritage from the surrounding area. The museum also houses the Marian Campbell Library, a resource library containing books and journals about local archaeology, history and natural history.

== History ==
The Kilmartin Museum Trust was founded in 1994 by Rachel Butter and David Clough, to preserve and promote the archaeological heritage of the area. The museum, then known as Kilmartin House Centre for Archaeology and Landscape Interpretation, opened to the public in 1997. The museum closed in 2021 for a £7 million redevelopment project to join the existing museum to a neighbouring building to expand the available gallery space.

== Awards ==
The museum won Scottish Hydro-Electric Museum of the Year Award a year after opening in 1998. Following its redevelopment, Kilmartin Museum was nominated for Permanent Exhibition of the Year in the Museums + Heritage Awards 2024. Receiving a "Highly Commended" accolade from the judges.

== Collections ==
Kilmartin Museum's collection was established through the work of pioneering female archaeologists Marion Campbell and Mary Sandeman. Campbell and Sanderman undertook the first comprehensive field survey of Mid-Argyll between 1954 and 1962. Campbell donated items from her personal collection to establish the museum and bequeathed her collection of artefacts, library books and archives to the Museum on her death in 2000

The museum contains over 22,000 collection items, with many items on loan from National Museums Scotland and the British Museum. The collection contains some of Scotland's earliest examples of Beaker pottery, which dates back to around 4,500 years ago. A Bronze Age pot, discovered in 1860 in Glebe Cairn right outside the museum, is a star attraction on display. The collection also includes quartz tools, which were used to carve prehistoric rock art, and metal artefacts from the Bronze Age, highlighting the technological advancements of that period.

The Prehistoric collection of the museum was Recognised as a Nationally Significant Collection by Museums Galleries Scotland in 2019. It became the 50th collection to receive Recognised status.

== See also ==
Kilmartin Glen
