= Moine Mhòr =

Area of raised bog in Argyll and Bute, Scotland

Moine Mhòr National Nature Reserve
- IUCN category IV (habitat/species management area)
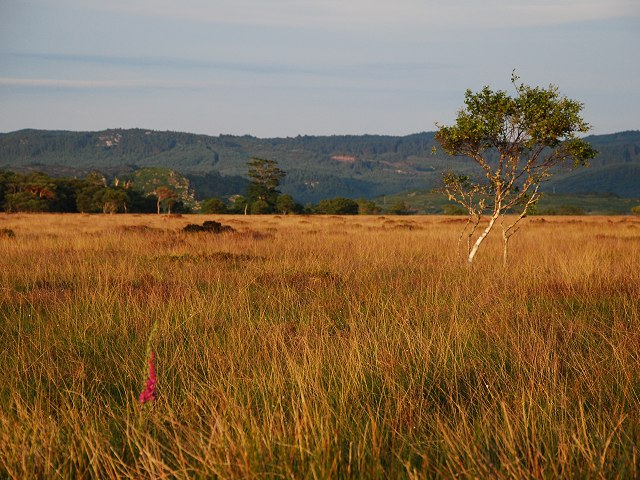
- Evening view across the Moine Mhòr

- Location within Argyll and Bute
- Location: Argyll and Bute, Scotland
- Coordinates: 56.080833°N 5.499753°W
- Area: 492.5 ha (1,217 acres)
- Established: 1987
- Governing body: NatureScot
- Website: Moine Mhòr National Nature Reserve

Moine Mhòr ("Great Moss" in Scottish Gaelic) encompasses a large area of raised bog in the Kilmartin Glen area of Argyll and Bute, Scotland. As well as raised bog there are areas of saltmarsh, brackish grassland, alder carr, fen and woodland, and the variety of habitats at Moine Mhòr provide important habitats for a variety of animal and plant species. The area was declared a national nature reserve (NNR) in 1987, and is now owned and managed by NatureScot. According to NatureScot lowland raised bogs like Moine Mhòr are some of the rarest and most threatened natural wildlife habitats in Europe, due to removal of peat, afforestation and reclamation of farmland.

Around 8,000 people visit the Moine Mhòr NNR every year, with the reserve being popular with local people and school groups, as well as tourists visiting the nearby attractions of Kilmartin Glen and the Crinan Canal. A 600 m nature trail has been constructed at the northern edge of the reserve; other visitor facilities include a car park and picnic area.

== History ==
The Moine Mhòr began to form after the last ice age some 10,000 years ago, as rising sea levels covered the area in impermeable marine clay. The land began to rise as the glaciers melted due to post-glacial rebound, and a shallow estuary formed at the mouth of the River Add. A freshwater loch formed over the Moine Mhòr, separated from the sea by an area of saltmarsh. About 5,500 years ago sea levels fell further, and sphagnum mosses started to colonise the area, which was kept damp due to the impermeable clay. Over time layers of peat were laid down, leading to the Moine Mhòr as it is today.

Moine Mhòr lies to the west of Kilmartin Glen, one of the most important prehistoric landscapes in Scotland, however the boggy conditions prevented these prehistoric people from living or farming on the moss. It is nonetheless likely that they would have used the bog to cut peat for fuel, and to collect berries and lichens for food, drinks, dyes, and potions. Core samples have shown that the bog was regularly burnt to maintain open grazing for animals. The Crinan Canal, built immediately to the south of the Moine Mhòr between 1794 and 1801, led to a decline in peat cutting, as coal from the Glasgow area began to replace peat as fuel. Landowners began to "reclaim" the bog by drainage in order to commence agriculture. Controlled burning of the unimproved sections of the bog continued, however the focus shifted from grazing to sporting interests, with the aim of encouraging red grouse for shooting parties. Around 1980 approximately 100 ha of conifer plantation were planted at Moine Mhor. In order to prevent the disappearance of more of the blanket bog, the Nature Conservancy Council (NCC - the predecessor body of NatureScot) decided to purchase 500 ha of land and declared the area a national nature reserve. Since taking ownership NatureScot have attempted to reverse historical drainage of the bog by the damming of drainage ditches, with over 190 dams having been constructed by 2017. This has led to a rise in the water table, and allowed the sphagnum mosses to regenerate. NatureScot has also taken action to remove trees and scrubs in order to maintain the area as a raised bog.

== Flora and fauna ==
Sphagnum mosses are the key plants in the formation of a raised bog and nine species have been recorded at Moine Mhòr NNR. The marginal habitats mean that there is also a diverse flowering plant community, including purple heath orchid, round-leaved sundew, bog myrtle and bog asphodel. The plant life of the bog helps supports many types of invertebrates, including the marsh fritillary (one of Europe’s most threatened butterfly species), which lives on devil's-bit scabious, a plant of the drier fringes of the bog. The large heath butterfly, a UK Biodiversity Action Plan priority species is also present, and the reserve hosts many species of dragonflies.

235 bird species have been recorded at the reserve, with the bog itself supporting species such as curlew and meadow pipit, whilst redshank, snipe and oystercatcher breed on the saltmarsh areas. The reserve hosts an important population of breeding hen harriers; other raptors present include short-eared owls, which also breed here occasionally, whilst ospreys can be seen fishing along the river and at the estuary. Otters regularly visit the watercourses, and roe and sika deer also visit the Moine Mhòr.

== Conservation designations ==
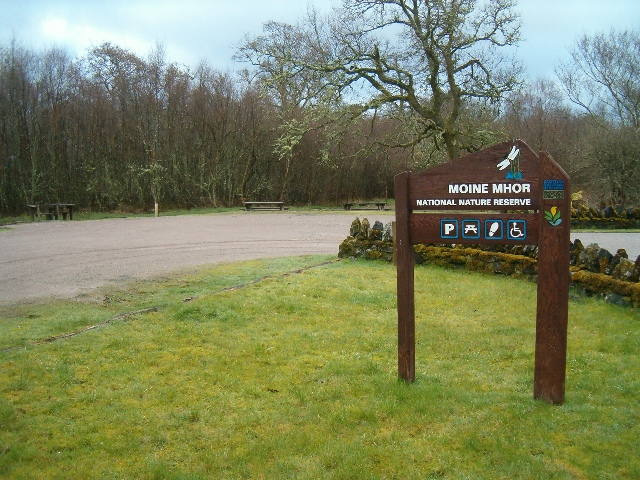
Entrance to the Moine Mhòr National Nature Reserve

The national nature reserve is classified as a Category IV protected area by the International Union for Conservation of Nature. Moine Mhòr also holds other national and international conservation designations for its natural heritage, being both a Site of Special Scientific Interest (SSSI) and a Special Area of Conservation (SAC): these designations cover a wider area than the NNR (c. 11.5 km^{2}). Moine Mhòr lies within the Knapdale national scenic area (NSA)
