= Eilean dà Mhèinn =

Island in Loch Crinan, Scotland

Eilean dà Mhèinn (Gaelic)
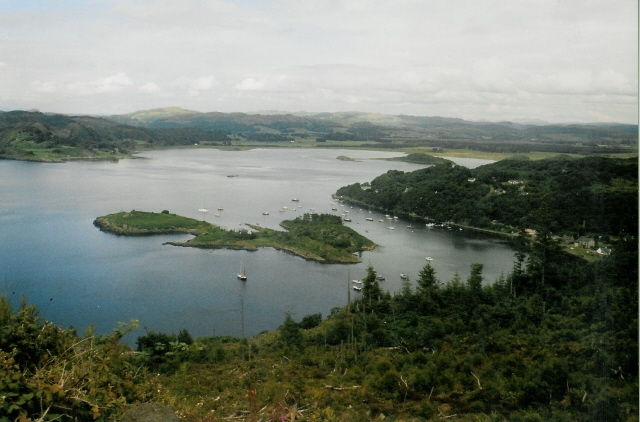
- Eilean dà Mhèinn in Loch Crinan

Location
- Eilean dà Mhèinn shown within Argyll and Bute
- OS grid reference: NR781944
- Coordinates: 56.091°N 5.567°W

Name
- Name meaning: island of two mines

Physical geography
- Island group: Islay
- Area: c. 3 ha (7 acres)
- Highest elevation: 16 m (52 ft)

Administration
- Council area: Argyll and Bute
- Country: Scotland
- Sovereign state: United Kingdom

Demographics
- Population: 4
- Population rank: 82=

Eilean dà Mhèinn, is a small inhabited island in Loch Crinan and one of the Inner Hebrides of Scotland.

It is about 100 metres (330 ft) to the west of the village of Crinan in Knapdale at high tide and only a fraction of that distance from the mainland shore at low tide.

Although apparently not permanently inhabited in 2001 according to the 2011 census there was a single inhabitant at that time. The 2022 census recorded the resident population as four. It has a landing stage on the eastern shore and a building near the centre of the island. The crowded harbour at Crinan has so many moorings that "it is no longer possible to anchor to the south or east" of the island.

The island, with the alias "Harbour Island", was put up for sale in May 2026 by Savills estate agent, with an asking price of £1.25million. The property listing described the island as a "captivating private Scottish island, discreetly positioned just off the coast near Lochgilphead and surrounded by the sheltered, unspoilt waters of the west coast. Extending to approximately 9.7 acres, the island offers a rare combination of natural beauty, privacy and carefully considered architecture, centred around a beautifully renovated principal house and a charming self contained cabin known as The Witch's Folly."

Eilean dà Mhèinn is part of the Knapdale National Scenic Area, one of 40 in Scotland.
