= Kilberry =

Coordinates: 55°49′11″N 5°38′53″W

Kilberry: Scottish Gaelic: Cill Bheiridh
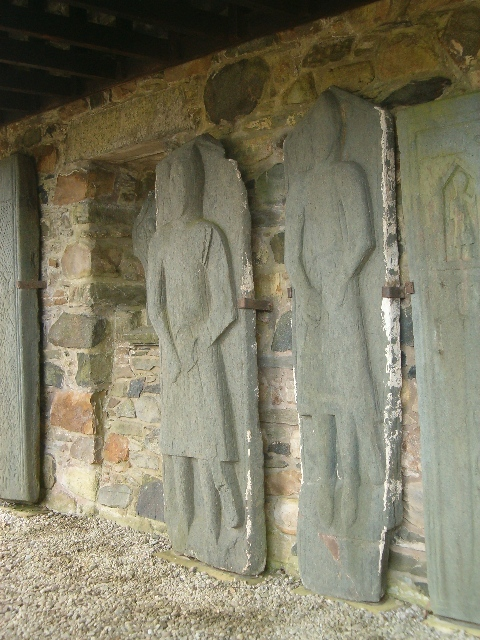
- Late medieval grave slabs at Kilberry

- Location within Argyll and Bute
- Civil parish: South Knapdale
- Council area: Argyll and Bute
- Country: Scotland
- Sovereign state: United Kingdom
- Police: Scotland
- Fire: Scottish
- Ambulance: Scottish
- UK Parliament: Argyll, Bute and South Lochaber
- Scottish Parliament: Argyll and Bute

Kilberry (Scottish Gaelic: Cill Bheiridh) is a village in Argyll and Bute, Scotland. It is close to the western coast of the district of Knapdale.

Kilberry Castle, just to the west of the village, was built in 1497 as a L-plan castle by a cadet branch of Clan Campbell. The castle was destroyed by an English pirate in 1513. The ruins were incorporated into the present mansion, built in 1844 by John Campbell and enlarged in 1871.

A group of sculptured stones, in the care of Historic Environment Scotland, are on display in a purpose-built shelter in the grounds of the castle. The stones, which include cross-slabs and medieval grave markers, originally came from the medieval parish church, which was destroyed in the 17th century.

== People from Kilberry ==
- Marion Campbell, archaeologist and novelist
