= Temple Wood =

Standing stone circles in Scotland

Coordinates: 56°07′24.78″N 5°29′55.40″W

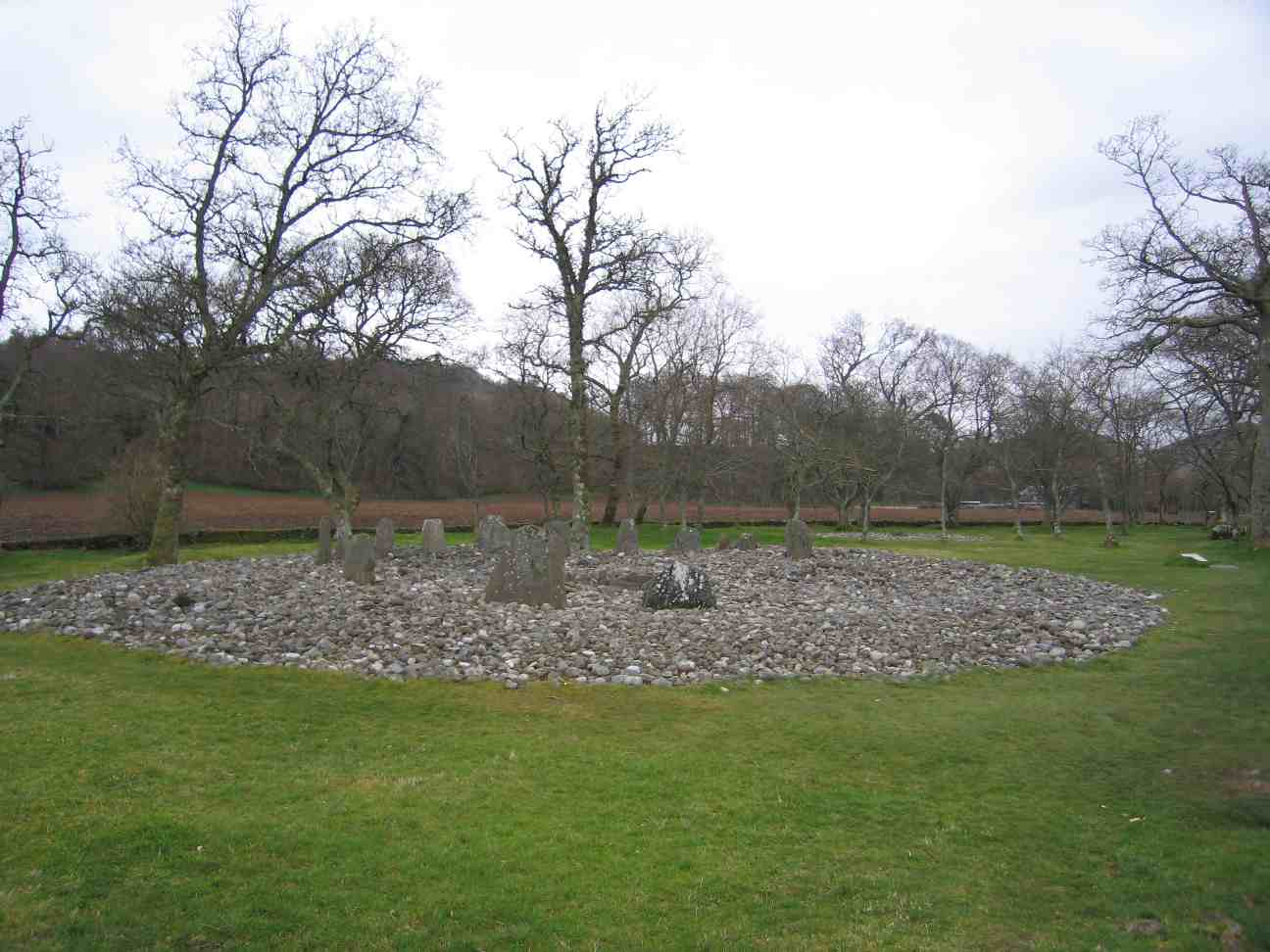
Temple Wood site with southern circle in foreground

Temple Wood (or Half Moon Wood) is an ancient site located in Kilmartin Glen, near Kintyre, Argyll, Scotland. The site includes two circles (north and south). The southern circle contains a ring of 13 standing stones about 12 metres (40 feet) in diameter. In the past it may have had 22 stones. In the centre is a burial cist surrounded by a circle of stones about 3 metres (10 feet) in diameter. Other later burials are associated with the circle. According to the Historic Scotland information marker at the site, the southern circle's first incarnation may have been constructed around 3000 BC.

The northern circle is smaller and consists of rounded river stones (which also fill the southern circle). In its centre is a single stone; another stone is found on the edge of the circle. This circle may have originated as a timber circle.

The name of the site originates in the 19th century (coinciding with the planting of trees around the circles) and has no relevance to the purpose of the site. It is located just south of the southern Nether Largie cairn. It is a designated scheduled monument.

== See also ==
- Stone circles in the British Isles and Brittany
- List of stone circles
- Scheduled monuments in Argyll and Bute
