= River Add =

River in Argyll and Bute, Scotland

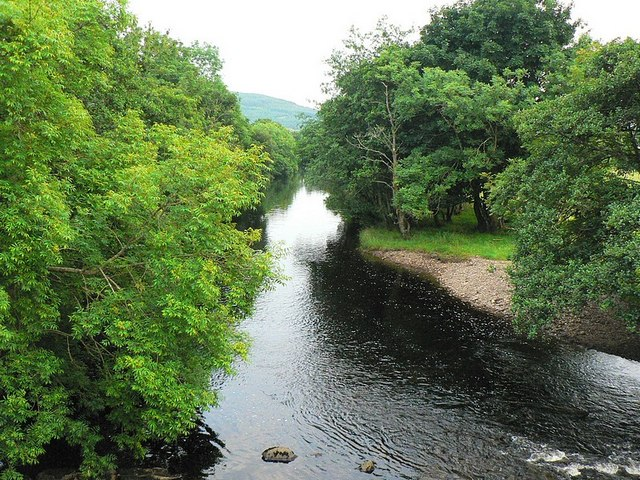
- The River Add near Kilmichael Glassary

Location
- Country: Scotland

Physical characteristics
- Source
  - location: Streams near Loch Sidheannach
- Mouth
  - location: Loch Crinan, Crinan
  - coordinates: 56.0917°N 5.5483°W

Basin features
- Tributaries
  - left: Kilmartin Burn, Rhudil Burn
  - right: Abhainn Bheag an Tunns

The River Add (Scottish Gaelic: Abhainn Àd) is a river which runs through Argyll and Bute on the west coast of Scotland. Historically, it was known as the river Airigh but to avoid confusion with the Aray (which gives its name to Inveraray), it was renamed the River Add.

The surrounding valley still retains the name Glen Airigh, and the river gave rise to the name Glassary (Glas Airidh, meaning grey or green shieling or hill-pasture), by which the surrounding district of Glassary is known. In turn, this forms the second part of the name of Kilmichael Glassary, a village in the lower parts of the valley. Kilmichael Glassary is the home village of the founder of the Campbells of Auchinbreck, a senior cadet branch of Clan Campbell. The 1,500-foot (460 m) high Marylyn of Beinn Dubh Airigh is situated on the northern edge of Glen Airigh, separating it from Glen Awe.

== Route ==
The river begins at Loch Sidheannach, which is fed from the nearby hills, including Loch nan Losgann, close to the peak of Beinn Dubh Airigh. After passing through a heavily wooded area it reaches a tall concrete dam with a control centre, which is labelled "pumping station" on maps. A fish ladder allows fish to access the upper reaches of the river, and a weir controls water flow into a surface aqueduct which follows the left bank of the river for some distance. The aqueduct is part of the Loch Gair Hydro-Electric Scheme, and feeds into a pipeline which discharges into Loch Glashan.

Below the dam, the river is joined by several small tributaries and a larger tributary carrying some of the flow from Blackmill Loch, the Feorlin reservoir and Abhainn Bheag an Tunns, although the flow is diminished because some of it enters aqueducts and pipelines to increase the catchment of Loch Glashan, a much larger reservoir which feeds the Loch Gair power station. The River Add skirts the north-western side of Loch Glashan, passes over a weir, and enters a narrow gorge, which is crossed by a high-level pipeline carrying more water to Loch Glashan.

The valley then widens out, and the river follows a more meandering course. It is crossed by two bridges carrying a local road to the hamlet of Kilmichael Glassary (Gleann Cill Mhicheil Glas-Airigh). Between the bridges, it is joined on its right bank by Allt Slochd an Ime, which drains the foothills of Creag Buireinich. The hamlet is to the west of the river, and at Bridgend, it is crossed by a Category B Listed bridge with four spans. The bridge is long and narrow, with the two central spans higher than those at the edges. It carries a plaque on the downstream side that states it was "Built by the Shire 1737". Immediately afterwards, it is crossed by the Bridgend bypass, part of the A816 road.

The river is crossed by a small bridge, providing access to Dunadd fort, which is situated on a rocky outcrop on the left bank of the channel. It is a high-status Early Historic structure, where rock carvings and ogam inscriptions can be seen. It is a scheduled monument, and is thought to have been the capital of the early Scottish kingdom of Dál Riata.

The river continues its meandering course and is joined by the Rhudil Burn and the Kilmartin Burn, both on the right bank. Here it is surrounded by the bog fields on the Mòine Mhòr Nature Reserve, and becomes tidal below the Kilmartin Burn confluence. As it approaches the hamlet of Bellanoch, it is crossed by the Islandadd bridge carrying the B8025 road. This was designed by the engineer James Gardner and constructed of cast iron in 1851. Its five flat spans are supported by ashlar piers, which are faced with rock. It is a Category A listed structure, and is the largest and best example of a Scottish bridge of this type. The river ends at Loch Crinan by the village of Crinan, and flows into the Sound of Jura. From Islandadd Bridge, the Crinan Canal runs along its left bank.

== Bibliography ==
- Johnston, James Brown (1903). Place-names of Scotland. D Douglas.
