= Kilberry Castle =

General information
- Architectural style: Scottish baronial architecture
- Location: Kilberry, Scotland
- Coordinates: 55°48′56.9″N 5°39′34.4″W
- Construction started: 1497

Design and construction
- Architect: David Bryce

Renovating team
- Architect: Charles Kinnear

Listed Building – Category B
- Designated: 20 July 1971
- Reference no.: LB18277

Kilberry Castle is a Category B listed country house near Kilberry in South Knapdale in the county of Argyll, in western Scotland on the shores of the Sound of Jura.

== History and architecture ==
The castle is said to have been built at the end of the fifteenth century. The MacMurachies are understood to have owned the castle under the Lords of the Isles and they were followed by the Earls of Argyll. Eventually the Campbells of Kilberry took up residence in the early 16th century. During the civil war the castle was besieged by royalist forces between 1643 and 1645.

In 1733 the Campbell mausoleum was built by Dugald Campbell 6th of Kilberry. The castle was accidentally burned down in 1772 or 1773. Although it continued to be occupied, a proper restoration was not undertaken until 1844 when John Campbell, 5th of Knockbury and 9th of Kilberry commissioned its rebuilding in 1844 by the architect David Bryce. John Campbell, 6th of Knockbury and 10th of Kilberry commissioned further extensions in 1873 by Charles Kinnear of Edinburgh. The works were carried out by Mr Harris, builder of St Andrew’s.

Following the death of Lt.-Col. John Campbell, 7th of Knockbury and 11th of Kilberry in 1928 the house was advertised for sale at which point it was described as having an estate of 7,000 acres (11 sq mi). John Campbell's daughter Marion Campbell (later a noted archaeologist) inherited Kilberry Estate when she was 8 years old, following her father's death. The Kilberry Estate was sold to an older cousin, but Campbell regained possession of it once she turned 18.

In 2021, Kilberry Castle was advertised for sale and has since been reintegrated into the Kilberry Estate. The castle, along with other historic buildings on the estate, is currently undergoing restoration. The renovation work is expected to be completed by 2029, with the Castle set to return to its historic role as the principal house of the Kilberry Estate.
