= Dugald MacTavish of Dunardry =

14th Hereditary Chief of Clan MacTavish

- Born: c. 1664; Dunardry, Knapdale, Argyll, Scotland
- Died: 1685; Carnasserie Castle, near Kilmartin, Argyll, Scotland
- Cause of death: Execution by hanging
- Resting place: Kilmartin Churchyard, North Knapdale, Argyll
- Known for: 14th Hereditary Chief of Clan MacTavish; Commander of Carnasserie Castle

Dugald MacTavish of Dunardry (c. 1664 – 1685), also known as the Fiar of Dunardry, was the 14th Hereditary Chief of Clan MacTavish whose ancestral seat was at Dunardry in Knapdale, Argyll. He is notable as the commander of Carnasserie Castle during Argyll's Rising in 1685, and for his execution by hanging following the castle's surrender — a violation of the terms of capitulation under which he had yielded the castle.

== Background ==
Dugald MacTavish was born around 1664, the son of Donald MacTavish, the 13th Chief of Clan MacTavish, whose ancestral seat had been held at Dunardry in Knapdale since approximately 893 AD. By the time of Argyll's Rising in 1685, the MacTavish name was documented throughout Knapdale, Kilmichael Glassary, and Kilberry — in three parishes alone, twenty-five MacTavish rebels and forty fencible men of the name were listed, sixty-five MacTavish fighting men recorded in a single event.

== Argyll's Rising and the Siege of Carnasserie Castle ==
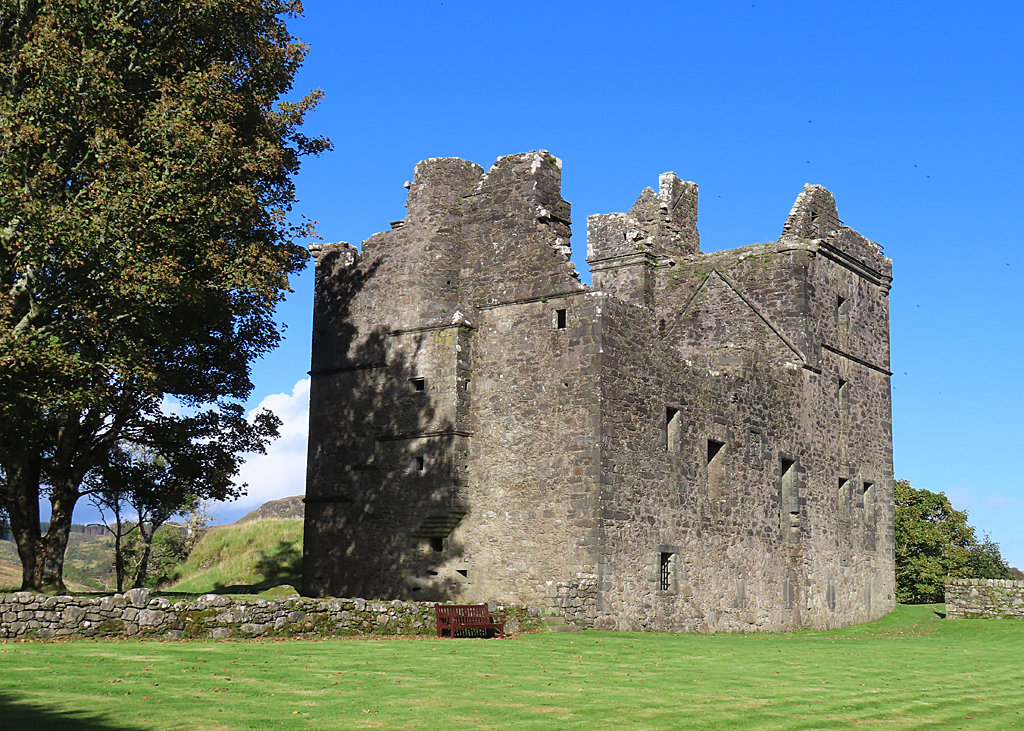
Carnasserie Castle

Carnasserie Castle, near the village of Kilmartin, had been held for the 9th Earl of Argyll during his rebellion against James VII — the Earl's part in the Monmouth Rebellion. Dugald MacTavish, 14th Chief and Fiar of Dunardry, aged approximately 21, commanded the castle's garrison during the siege.

The castle was captured and partly blown up by a Royalist force commanded by MacLean of Torloisk, and left as a burnt-out shell. When the castle was surrendered under terms of peaceful capitulation, the besieging forces violated those terms. Dugald MacTavish was hanged within bow-draught of the castle gateway immediately after the surrender.

In 1690, Campbell of Auchinbreck later brought a petition before Parliament claiming £118,000 Scots in losses. A fifth of that sum was for Carnasserie's destruction, and the remainder was tied to his uncle's death and the ruin of his estate.

The Inveraray Sheriff Court Records of 1685 record "Donald Mc tavish of Dunardarie heritor execut" among the rebels of Argyll's Rising — a direct legal designation of a MacTavish as heritor of Dunardry in an official court instrument of the period.

== Death and burial ==
Dugald MacTavish was buried at Kilmartin Churchyard, North Knapdale, Argyll — the ancient burial ground of the Chiefs of Clan MacTavish.

== Succession ==
His father, Donald MacTavish, 13th Chief, had his lands forfeited in 1685 for his part in following the Earl of Argyll in the rising; they were subsequently restored to a cousin. Dugald's brother Alexander MacTavish succeeded him as 15th Chief and also died in 1685, "serving the Earl of Argyll."

== See also ==
- Clan MacTavish
- Carnasserie Castle
- Argyll's Rising
- Kilmartin

Preceded by Donald MacTavish, 13th Chief	14th Hereditary Chief of Clan MacTavish c. 1664–1685	Succeeded by Alexander MacTavish, 15th Chief
