= Dorothea Primrose Campbell =

Scottish poet and novelist (1793–1863)

Dorothea Primrose Campbell (4 May 1793 – 6 January 1863) was a poet, novelist and teacher from the Shetland islands of Scotland. She wrote a novel, Harley Radington: A Tale (1821), and had poems and short fiction printed in London periodicals. Campbell continued to write in the face of family trauma, poverty, and ethnic and gender discrimination. Her melodic, whimsical poetry and her works of fiction are seen as revealing works that cover historical and societal barriers which Campbell herself was facing.

== Life ==
=== Early family difficulties ===
Dorothea Primrose Campbell was born in Lerwick on 4 May 1793 and was baptised on 11 May in her birthplace. Her father, Duncan Campbell, was a surgeon who had married Elizabeth (Eliza), one of the Scotts of Scottshall in Scalloway. Dorothea was the eldest of the family, with a younger sister and two brothers. The many difficulties included long family struggles with debts from her grandfather, her mother's struggle against opium addiction, and the death of her father when she was just 16.

=== Teaching ===
Dorothea Primrose Campbell was well educated and appears to have begun writing poetry at a very young age. She later used her writing abilities to support her family. By 1812 Campbell had become a teacher and in 1813 opened her own school in Lerwick. Through her family connections she met Sir Walter Scott, a distant relative, during his tour of the north of Scotland aboard the Lighthouse Commission's yacht. Scott was encouraging and even shipped her a piano for the little school she had established.

However, the school closed due to Campbell's poor health and her mother's opium addiction. After the closure, Campbell worked as a schoolteacher to support her family. During a correspondence between 1817 and 1821, Walter Scott offered her moral and financial support. Nonetheless, court records reveal that she owed sums to creditors in 1822, 1823, and 1835.

In 1841, Campbell was invited to move from Shetland to England, to serve as a governess to Dr Clarke's family, which consisted of his daughter, Eliza Frances Hook, and Eliza's husband, James Hook. Unfortunately, the Clarke family soon went bankrupt and Campbell was left unemployed in England. In the 1841 England Census, she is listed as governess to seven children of the Richard Smith family at Stoke Newington, Middlesex.

=== Perseverance and downfall ===
Campbell applied unsuccessfully for several jobs, but as a woman over forty and a Shetlander, the prejudices against her were strong. Campbell applied to the Royal Literary Fund in 1844, having been unemployed for some time. The Fund paid her £30. Eventually she was also able to find a job teaching at Sevenoaks. In the 1851 England Census, Campbell is listed as living alone at 16 Quartre Bras, Hexham, Northumberland, assisted by a pension from the Governesses' Benevolent Institution.

==== Death ====
In January 1863, Campbell died at the Aged Governesses' Asylum in Kentish Town in London, where she had been living as an inmate at the time of the 1861 England Census. On 10 January 1863, she was buried at the former parish of St James, Hampstead Road, St Pancras, Camden.

== Writings ==
=== Poems, Inverness (1811) ===
Aspiring to relieve her family's grim financial status, Campbell corresponded with the publisher J. Young, whose support meant that Campbell's Poems were published in duodecimo at Inverness in 1811.

Records show that Campbell was only ten years old when she wrote Address to the Evening Star, which was not published until 1811, when Campbell was 18. However, one critic notes that Campbell's poems published at Inverness "do not read like juvenilia. They are flowing, expressive, verbally and musically skilled, whether in conventional poetic diction or more colloquial mode."

=== Poems, London (1816) ===
Campbell's second, London edition of Poems appeared in November 1816. The subscribers were mostly from Lerwick and London. It included some poems from her first volume. It was remarked that "Campbell often expresses sorrow and nostalgia in exile and a longing for wider prospects." Campbell's straits appear as her "tone becomes progressively darker, dwelling on death and the slights meted out to poverty." The poems did not bring prosperity. The publisher may have gone bankrupt – only half the stock of 500 copies had sold by April 1818, though Sarah Josepha Hale noted in Woman's Record (1853), "The character of her poetry, chiefly suggested by the wild, rough scenery with which she lives surrounded, is healthy in its tone and breathes of home and heaven."

In this anthology, Campbell also made reference to fellow Scottish writer, Beatrice Grant, with a poem entitled To Mrs Grant of Duthell. On Reading Her "Intellectual Education".

=== Harley Radington: A Tale (1821) ===
In October 1821, A. K. Newman of Minerva Press published Harley Radington: A Tale, Campbell's one known novel. The tale, set in her birthplace, the Shetland Islands, impressed and interested a handful of readers. In 1823, William Scott Burn exalted Campbell's writing capabilities in a letter to his friend: "I read your Miss Campbell's Harley Radington when I was ill – that woman has very considerable talent, and should be encouraged to employ it oftener." Campbell seems to have been trying to fit her novel into a national-tale category along with concurrent works by others set in Ireland and the Scottish Highlands. In a September 1821 letter to Walter Scott, she wrote, "I have published an attempt at a 'Zetland Tale'". Presumably, Campbell decided to subtitle the book "A Tale" over "A Zetland Tale" due to her uncertainty that the Shetland Islands would be accepted by the public as a novel "set in the regions of Great Britain," as Shetland was seen by many in Britain as a "little-known country" at the time. According to Penny Fielding, researcher and Professor of English at the University of Edinburgh, "The novel focuses on the journey of the metropolitan hero to a distant part of the nation where he has family associations, and touches on questions of gender, superstition, ethnography, land improvement, and travel."

=== Campbell as Ora, the Lady's Monthly Museum (c. 1813–1853) ===
Recently found evidence shows that Campbell was a member of the Lady's Monthly Museum for some years, adopting a pseudonym, "Ora from Thule," under which she published 53 poems and tales. One of them, "The Apollonian Wreath," begins,

O hail! thou solitary star!
To me how dear thy dewy ray,
Which kindly streaming from afar,
Illumes a pensive wand'rer's way.
[...]
For while beneath thy lovely light,
The misty mountains round me rise,
The world receding leaves my sight,
And daring fancy mounts the skies.
Forgetful of my sorrows here,
Entranced, I muse on joys to come,
– And far above thy lucid sphere
My trembling spirit seeks her home.

There are conflicting accounts of how long Campbell wrote for the Lady's Monthly Museum. It appears she could have been publishing as Ora for any period between 1813 and 1853.

== Works ==
- Poems (Inverness, J. Young, 1811)
- Poems (London, Baldwin, Cradock, and Joy, 1816)
- Harley Radington: A Tale (London, A. K. Newman, 1821)
