= Séon Carsuel =

Séon Carsuel (John Carswell)
- Bishop of the Isles
- Church: Church of Scotland
- See: Diocese of the Isles
- In office: 1565–1572
- Predecessor: Eóin Caimbeul
- Successor: Eóin Caimbeul (same)
- Previous posts: Treasurer of Argyll; Parson of Kilmartin

Personal details
- Born: c. 1522 Probably Corsewall, Wigtownshire, Scotland
- Died: 1572

Séon Carsuel (Anglicized: John Carswell, modern Scottish Gaelic: Seon Carsuail; c. 1522 – 1572) was a 16th-century Scottish prelate, humanist, and Protestant reformer. When Carsuel completed his education he joined the service of the Protestant Earl of Argyll, tutoring his son and using his patronage to obtain benefices, most notably becoming Bishop of the Isles in 1565. Standing at over 7 feet (2.1 metres) in height, Carsuel was an important figure in the history of Scottish Gaelic, as in 1567 his Foirm na n-Urrnuidheadh, the Gaelic translation of the Book of Common Order, became the first work to be printed in any Goidelic language.

== Biography ==
=== Background and early years ===
Carsuel's family probably originated in Wigtownshire, the western part of Galloway, from Corsewall; the Campbell family, rulers of much of Argyll, owned the estate there. Additionally, most of Wigtownshire, like Argyll, was still Gaelic speaking at the beginning, at least, of the 16th century. Rev. Dr. Thomas McLauchlan and others have stated that Séon himself was born at Kilmartin in Argyll, but Robert Black has concluded that there is no evidence for this. He and Donald Meek consider it more likely that Carsuel's birthplace was in the Rhins of Galloway.

Born around 1522, Carsuel probably experienced a period of traditional Gaelic bardic schooling before becoming a student at the University of St Andrews in 1540; he graduated Master of Arts in either 1544 or 1545. There is evidence that in 1545, Carsuel joined the revolt of Domhnall Dubh, the claimant to the forfeited Lordship of the Isles; however, he appears to have abandoned this cause soon after, becoming a staunch supporter of Gilleasbaig Ruadh Caimbeul (Archibald Roy Campbell), fourth Earl of Argyll.

Carsuel's associations with Earl Gilleasbaig were strong enough for Carsuel to become chaplain to the earl, and probably lay behind in possession by September 1550, and certainly by 14 October 1551, of the Treasurership of Lismore Cathedral. He became parson of the parish church of Kilmartin in 1553.

It is probable that Carsuel was already a strong Protestant sympathiser by this point; Earl Gilleasbaig Ruadh was likewise a Protestant, possibly having converted as early as 1536 when he visited France. Earl Gilleasbaig placed his eldest son, also called Gilleasbaig (later fifth Earl of Argyll), under the tutelage of Carsuel.

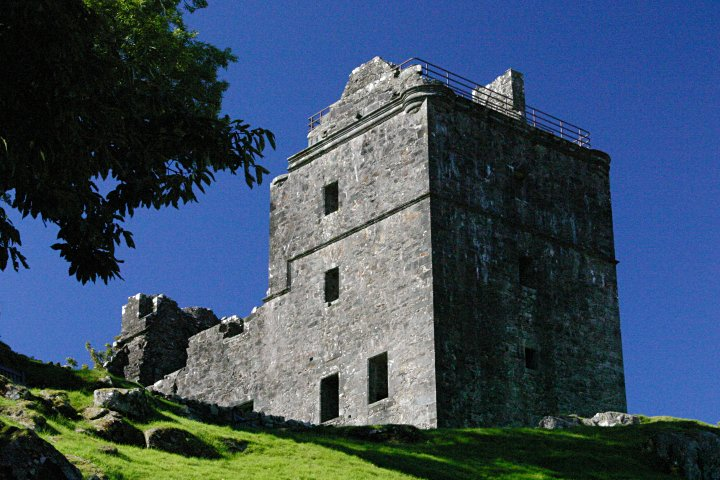
The approach to Carnassarie Castle from the south-east, a castle Carsuel is credited with rebuilding

In February 1559, the year following Earl Gilleasbaig Ruadh's death and the consequent succession of his son Gilleasbaig the fifth Earl of Argyll, the latter entrusted his stronghold of Carnassarie Castle to Carsuel, and in 1560 put Craignish Castle into his hands too. During his occupation of Carnassarie, he "massively enlarged" the castle using masons who had worked on Stirling Castle. In 1558, Argyll had secured Carsuel the position of Chancellor of the Chapel Royal at Stirling.

=== Protestant prelate ===
In the aftermath of the Reformation Parliament of 1560, in the following year Carsuel was appointed Protestant Superintendent of Argyll and the Isles. In 1563, he was given the power to lease the diocese of Argyll and the abbey of Saddell, and on 12 January 1565, Carsuel received a grant from Mary, Queen of Scots, of the revenues of the bishopric of the Isles and the abbey of Iona.

He received formal crown provision (rather than papal provision) on 24 March; a rival, Lachlan MacGill-Eathain (MacLean), was accused of going to the papacy to obtain the rights to the Isles and Iona, but gave up his rights in May 1567. Carsuel had obtained other benefices by this time, and by the end of his life had acquired land all over the west coast of Scotland, and it was later said in a Gaelic quatrain that he had "an empty greedy capacious maw" (sgròban lom gionach farsaing).

=== Foirm na n-Urrnuidheadh ===
It was during his time as Bishop of the Isles that Carsuel enacted the most important accomplishment of his life, the publication of Foirm na n-Urrnuidheadh (literally, "The form of the prayers"). This text was based upon the 1564 Scottish edition of the Book of Common Order, for which it is to some extent a translation; it was dedicated to the earl of Argyll, and contains a poem by Carsuel. When it was published in Edinburgh by Robert Lekprevik on 24 April 1567, it became the first book ever to be printed in Scottish Gaelic or any Goidelic language.

Its language has been characterised as "exuberant, highly decorated classical common Gaelic", and helped forward the message of Scottish Protestantism from the English-speaking south-east of the country into Gaelic-speaking Scotland. It was written in the traditional orthography of Irish Classical Common Gaelic, and Donald Meek has suggested that if it were not for Carsuel's training in this form of literacy and his decision to use it, Scottish Gaelic today may be employing, like the Manx language, a script with orthographic rules more similar to English and French than traditional Irish.

It was also ground-breaking in its use of prose for non-heroic material, "the first to use this type of formal Classical [Gaelic] prose". And Carsuel had indeed complained in his work about earlier Gaelic writings, slamming the

...darkness of sin and ignorance and design of those who teach and write and cultivate Gaelic, that they are more designed, and more accustomed, to compose vain, seductive, lying and worldly tales about the Tuatha De Danann and the sons of Mil and the heroes and Finn MacCoul and his warriors and to cultivate and piece together much else which I will not enumerate or tell here, for the purpose of winning for themselves the vain rewards of the world.

=== Family and death ===
Carsuel married a daughter of Hamilton of Halcraig, with whom he had at least one son, his heir Gilleasbaig Carsuel; he married a second time, to Mairead Chaimbeul (Margaret Campbell), to whom his daughter Christiana was probably born. He was recorded as very ill in December 1570, and he died sometime between 21 June and 4 September 1572; he was buried in a stone coffin in Ardchattan Priory, in a funeral remembered in tradition for the great storm which took place at the time.

In the late 19th century, his skeleton was dug up; the skeleton measured seven feet in length, making Carsuel an extremely tall man by the standard of any era or geographical location.

== Notes ==
Religious titles
Preceded by Padraig MacGill-Eathain	Commendator-Abbot of Iona; 1565–1572	Succeeded by Eóin Caimbeul
Preceded by Eóin Caimbeul	Bishop of the Isles; 1565–1572	Succeeded by Eóin Caimbeul
