= Loch Crinan =

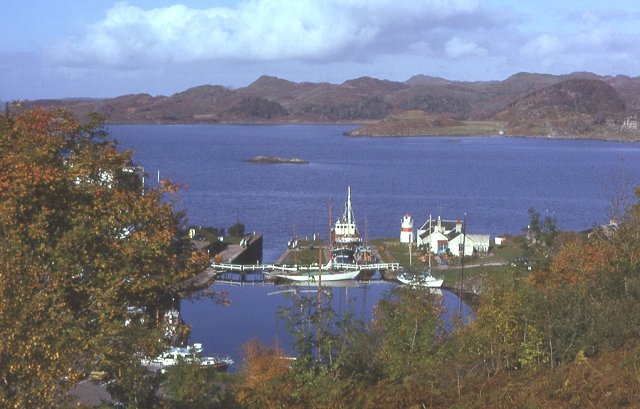
- View of the Loch over the harbour of Crinan village

- Location within Scotland
- Location: Scotland
- Coordinates: 56.0965°N 5.553°W -->
- Type: Seawater loch
- Basin countries: Scotland

Loch Crinan is a seawater loch on the West of Scotland, leading into the Sound of Jura and being the western end of the Crinan Canal. The village of Crinan is at the entrance to the canal at the eastern end of the loch. Duntrune Castle stands on the northern shore. The River Add goes into it by the hamlet of Bellanoch.

It contains the islets of An-unalin, Black Rock, Eilean dà Mhèinn, Eilean Glas, and Eilean nan Coinean.
