= Duntrune Castle =

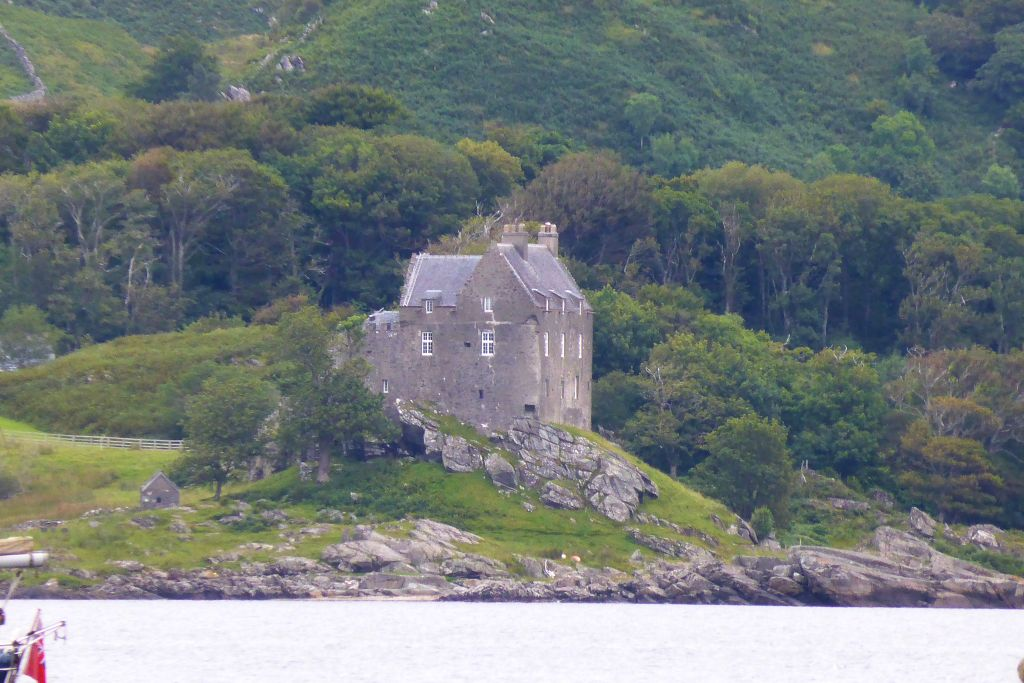
- Duntrune Castle in 2015

- Location within Argyll and Bute
- 56.10196°N 5.549273°W

Listed Building – Category B
- Official name: Duntrune Castle by Loch Crinan
- Designated: 20 July 1971
- Reference no.: LB11496

Inventory of Gardens and Designed Landscapes in Scotland
- Official name: Duntrune Castle
- Designated: 30 June 1987
- Reference no.: GDL00163

Duntrune Castle is located on the north side of Loch Crinan and across from the village of Crinan in Argyll and Bute, west of Scotland. It is thought to be the oldest continuously occupied castle on mainland Scotland. It was the seat of the Campbells of Duntroon until 1792. The castle is a category B listed building.

== History ==
It was originally built by the MacDougall clan in the 13th century, along with several other castles in the area, including the MacDougall stronghold of Dunollie Castle near Oban. Duntrune Castle was eventually taken by the Clan Campbell, becoming the seat of the Campbells of Duntroon. In the 17th century, the castle was besieged by the rival MacDonalds, under Alasdair Mac Colla. The Campbells sold Duntrune in 1792, to the Malcolms of Poltalloch. The castle is now owned by Robin Neill Malcolm, current clan chief of the Clan Malcolm.

The curtain wall of the castle dates from the 13th century, while the tower house, which forms the main part of the castle, dates from the 17th century. The castle was renovated in 1954.

== Popular culture ==
The gateposts of Skyfall lodge, James Bond's childhood home in the film of the same name, were modelled after those at Duntrune.

A photograph of Duntrune Castle is part of the original album inner sleeve art of the Blue Öyster Cult album Imaginos.

== See also ==
- Duntroon, Australian Capital Territory, a location named after the castle
- Robert Campbell (1769–1846), descended from the Campbells of Duntroon
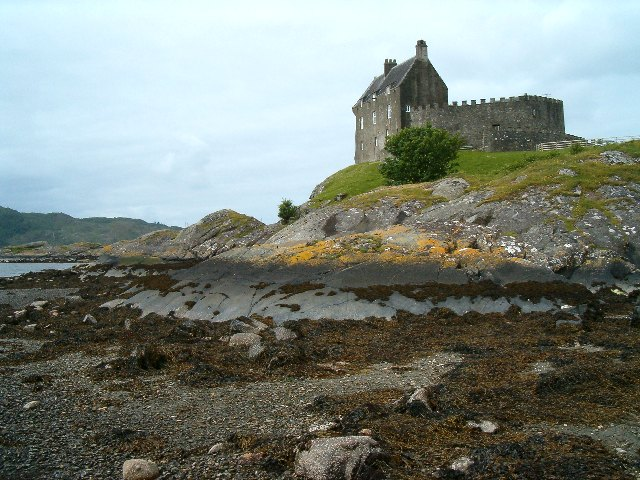
  Duntrune Castle in 2006
