= Lochgair =

Coordinates: 56°3′44″N 5°20′0″W

Lochgair: Scottish Gaelic: An Loch Geàrr
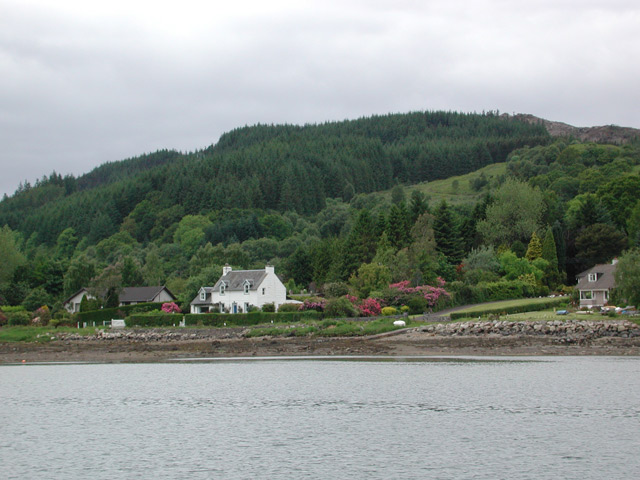
- Lochgair

- Location within Argyll and Bute
- OS grid reference: NR923903
- Council area: Argyll and Bute
- Lieutenancy area: Argyll and Bute
- Country: Scotland
- Sovereign state: United Kingdom
- Post town: LOCHGILPHEAD
- Postcode district: PA31
- Police: Scotland
- Fire: Scottish
- Ambulance: Scottish
- UK Parliament: Argyll, Bute and South Lochaber
- Scottish Parliament: Argyll and Bute

Lochgair (Scottish Gaelic: An Loch Geàrr) is a village in Argyll and Bute, Scotland. It lies on the coast of Loch Gair, a small inlet on the west of Loch Fyne. The A83 road runs through the village.

== In fiction ==
Lochgair is one of the main settings of Iain Banks's 1992 novel The Crow Road, which mixes real life locations in Argyll and the A83 road with fictional ones.
