= Kilmartin Glen =

British Neolithic monument site

Coordinates: 56°8′1″N 5°29′13″W

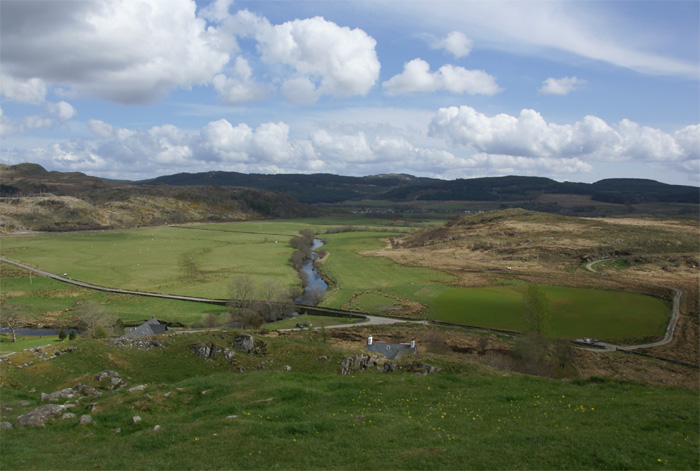
View of Kilmartin from Dunadd

Kilmartin Glen is an area in Argyll north of Knapdale. It has the most important concentration of Neolithic and Bronze Age remains in mainland Scotland. The glen is located between Oban and Lochgilphead, surrounding the village of Kilmartin. In the village, Kilmartin Museum explains the stories of this ancient landscape and the people who dwelt there. There are more than 800 ancient monuments within a six-mile (ten-kilometre) radius of the village, with 150 monuments being prehistoric. Monuments include standing stones, a henge monument, numerous cists, and a "linear cemetery" comprising five burial cairns. Several of these, as well as many natural rocks, are decorated with cup and ring marks.

The remains at Dunadd of the fortress of the Scots, a royal centre of Dal Riata, are located to the south of the glen, on the edge of the Moine Mhòr ("Great Moss"). Kilmartin Museum is located within the village itself and inspires and educates people by interpreting, explaining and conserving the internationally important archaeological landscape, artefacts, and natural heritage of Kilmartin Glen.

== The linear cemetery ==
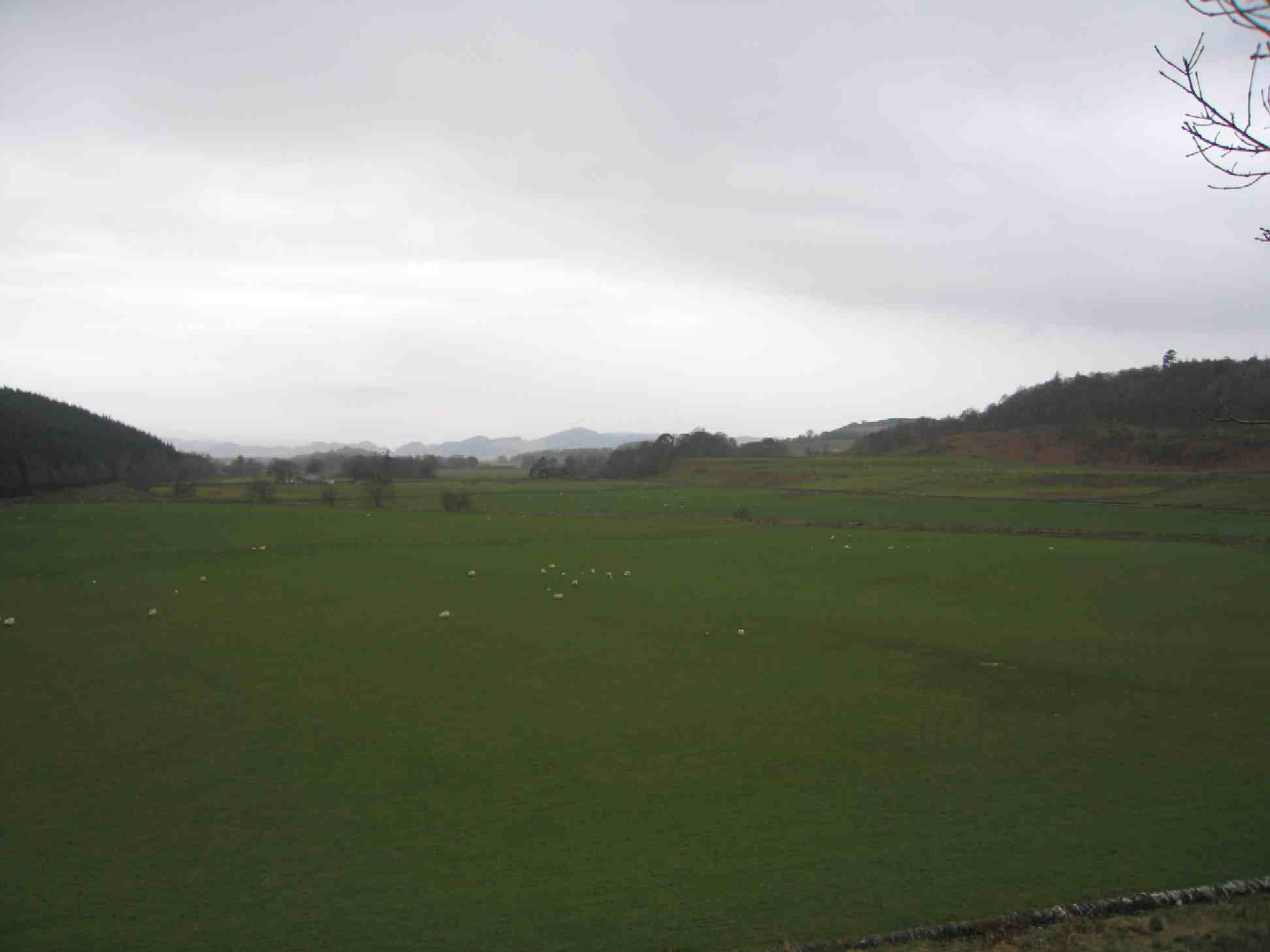
View south into Kilmartin Glen from Kilmartin village churchyard

The most visible feature of the Kilmartin Glen is the linear arrangement of cairns, running over three miles (five kilometres) south-by-southwest of the village. There are five remaining cairns in the alignment, although cropmarks and other traces suggest that there may originally have been more. The burial cairns are of Bronze Age origin, with the exception of Nether Largie South cairn, which is a Stone Age structure, rebuilt in the Bronze Age.

=== Glebe Cairn ===
The most northerly cairn, Glebe is situated immediately to the west of Kilmartin Village. The cairn was excavated in 1864 by the antiquary Canon William Greenwell, and two concentric stone circles were found beneath the stones. At the centre were two cist burials, and finds recovered included a jet necklace and a decorated bowl.

=== Nether Largie Mid Cairn ===
This cairn was first excavated in 1929, shortly after much of the stone had been reused in roadbuilding. It is around 30m across, and was formerly 3m in height. Kerbstones, which formed the boundary of the cairn, can still be seen. Inside two cists were found, with grooved joints between the stone slabs. Cup marks, and a carving of an axehead, can be seen on the southern cist.

=== Nether Largie South Cairn ===
Nether Largie South is the oldest monument of the linear cemetery. It is a Neolithic chambered cairn of the Clyde type, probably dating from the fourth millennium BC. The cairn was probably originally around 40m in diameter and 4m high, although stone robbing has reduced its size. The internal chamber, subdivided into four by floor slabs, is over 6m long, around 1.7m high, and 1.8m wide at its northern end, tapering to 1.5m. Although now exposed, the chamber would have been encased within the cairn. Two cists were also located in this cairn, to the south of the chamber. Archaeological finds recovered from Nether Largie South include Neolithic pottery and arrowheads.

=== Ri Cruin Cairn ===
This is the most southerly cairn in the linear cemetery, believed locally to be the possible burial place of a King. It was built between 2200 BC and 1950 BC, and was more recently used as a lime kiln. Three excavations took place at the site: By Reverend Mapleton (1870); Craw (1929); and V. Gordon Childe (1936). All traces of the lime kiln were removed following a reconstruction of the site.

== Standing stones ==
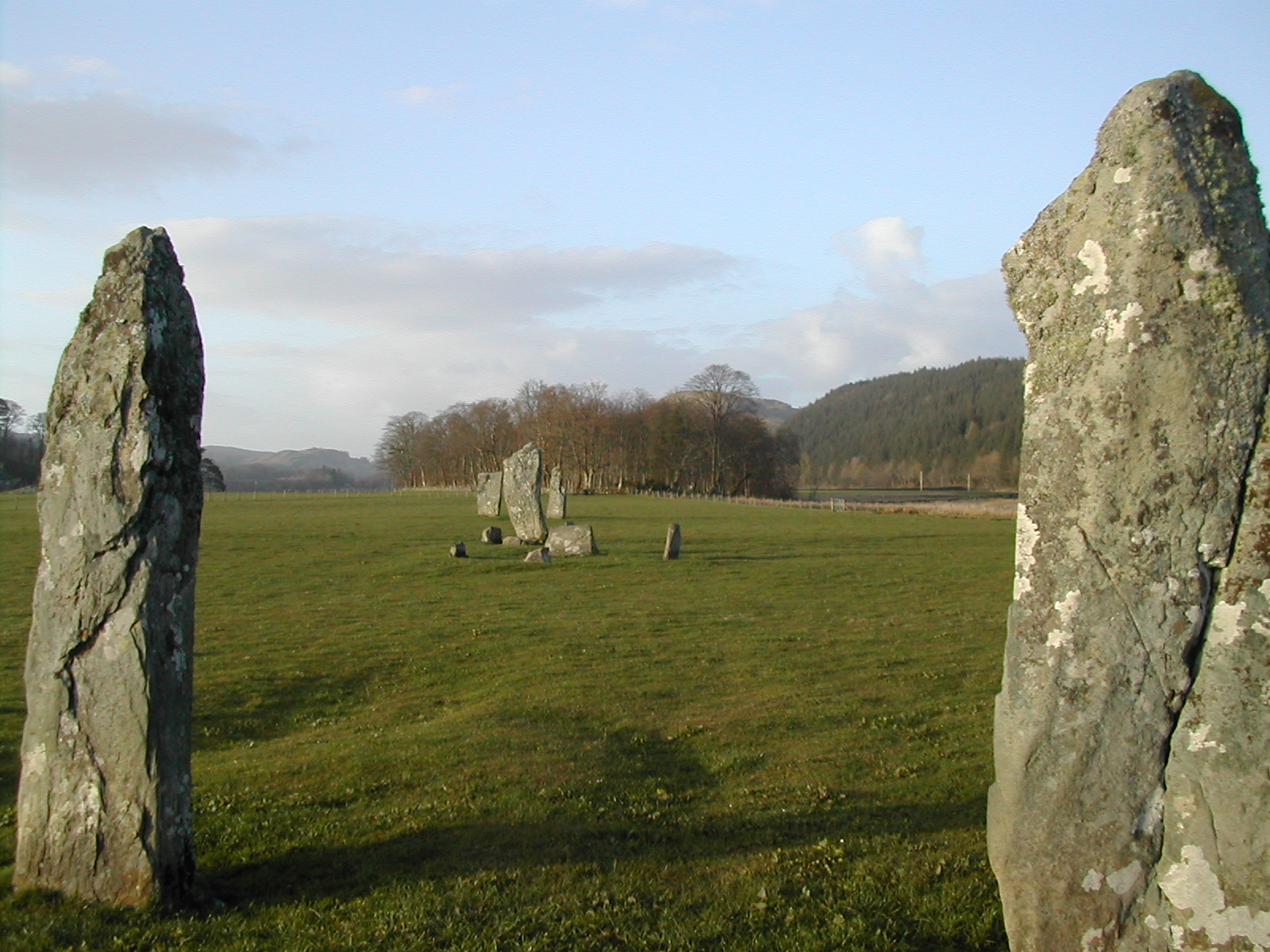
Nether Largie, Kilmartin Glen

=== Nether Largie standing stones ===
Nether Largie standing stones are located southeast of Temple Wood stone circle and are composed of four menhirs, arranged in pairs an approximately 70 metres apart, with a single menhir in the middle. Around which are seven smaller stones and one fallen one. Another menhir is one hundred metres to the northwest leading towards the circle. Alexander Thom toured this site with Magnus Magnusson in 1970 in a BBC television documentary called "Chronicle: Cracking the stone age code". He suggested that it "gave so much information that it must be regarded as one of the most important, if not the most important site in Britain". He clarified his hypothesis that it was a lunar observatory for predicting eclipses. A reassessment of this hypothesis was carried out by Jon Patrick from Melbourne University in 1979. His conclusion was:

that there are reasonable grounds for doubting that the Kilmartin Stones were deliberately orientated on the occurrence of any type of astronomical phenomena, for the following reasons:

(i) the Barbreck Stones do not indicate any of the same declinations of celestial bodies as the Kilmartin Stones;
(ii) the Barbreck Stones do not unambiguously indicate the declinations of any significant celestial body; and

(iii) the Barbreck Stones do not indicate any prominent notches that can be used for investigation into the orbital variations of the Moon.

== Cup and ring marks ==
Kilmartin Glen has "a remarkable concentration of some of the most impressive cup and ring decorated rock surfaces in Scotland". The purpose, and even the precise date, of cup and ring marks is uncertain. They are found on natural rock surfaces at Achnabreck, Cairnbaan, Ballygowan, and Baluachraig near Kilmichael Glassary.

== Carving depicting animals ==
In May 2021, archaeologists announced the discovery of prehistoric ancient deer carvings thought to date to the Neolithic or Early Bronze Age inside Dunchraigaig Cairn. They are the first of their kind to be found in Scotland. Depictions were contained two male red deer with full-grown forked horns, which were considered to have been the largest deer species in Scotland during this time.

== Bruach An Druimein ==
Two kilometers south of Kilmartin and one kilometer south of the Nether Largie South Cairn is the site of Bruach An Druimein. Excavated in the 1960s in advance of gravel quarrying, archaeologists discovered the remains of a Bronze Age cists cemetery, the remains of two round houses from the Iron Age, the first certain Iron Age roundhouses to have been discovered by excavation in Argyll, and a standing stone of a fairly recent date, the 19th century. The archaeological materials were examined shortly after the excavation but has since been reexamined in the 2000s and that has led to different interpretations of the site. Stone tools that were originally thought to be from the Mesolithic period, ending 3000 BC, are now believed to be from the neolithic or Bronze Age, but not related to the cist burials. Two medieval glass beads were found that have similar chemical compositions to those found at Dunadd, leading the archaeologists to believe the site was associated with Dunadd.

== Use in cultural productions ==
In 2007, Kilmartin Glen was the setting for Half Life, a piece of landscape art and performance created by the Scottish theatre company NVA in collaboration with the National Theatre of Scotland.

== See also ==
- Ballochmyle cup and ring marks
