= Stone carving =

Act of shaping stone materials

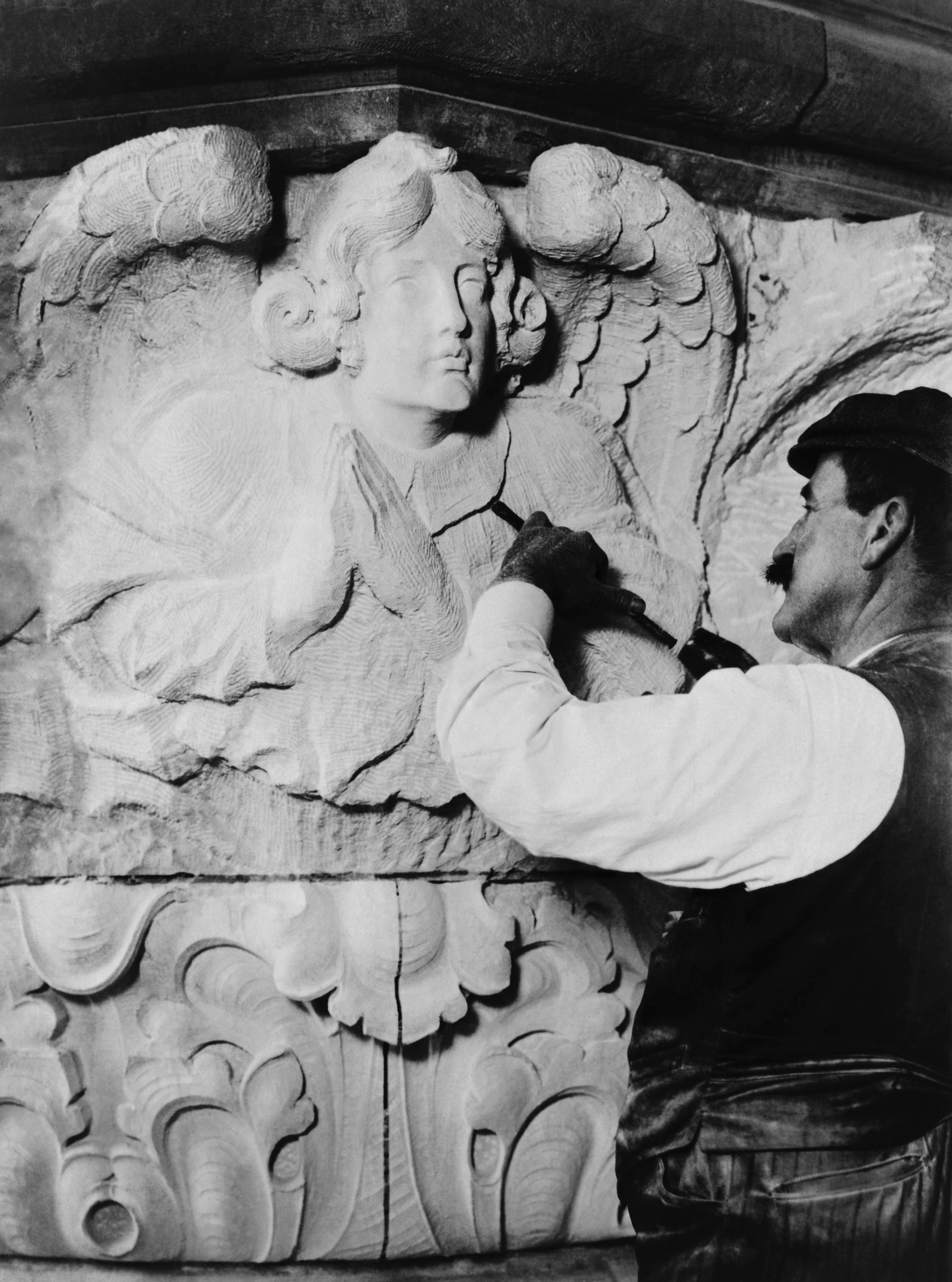
Stone carver carving stone, at the Cathedral of Saint John the Divine, New York, 1909.

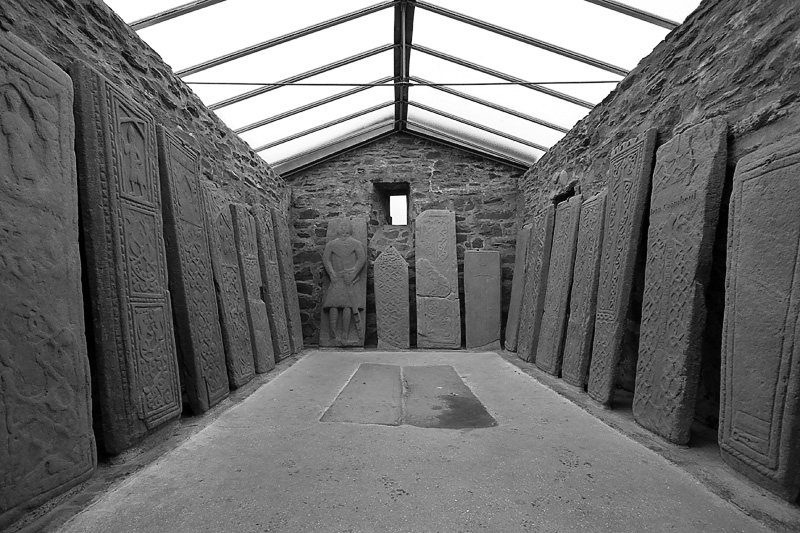
The Kilmartin Stones in Scotland - a collection of ancient stone carved graveslabs

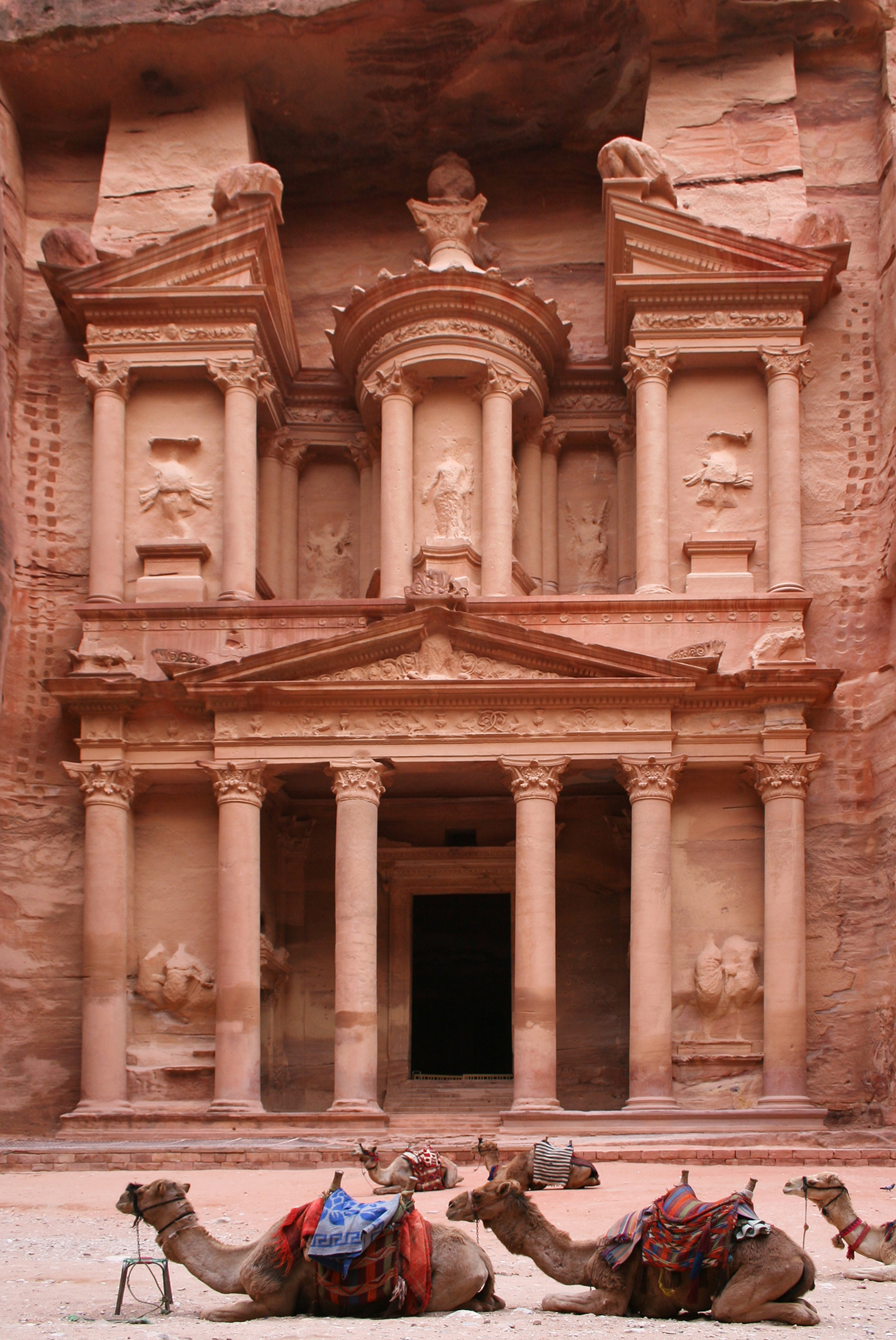
Khazneh structure carved into a cliff in Petra southern Jordan

Stone carving is an activity where pieces of rough natural stone are shaped by the controlled removal of stone. Owing to the permanence of the material, stone work has survived which was created during our prehistory or past time.

Work carried out by paleolithic societies to create stone tools is more often referred to as knapping. Stone carving that is done to produce lettering is more often referred to as lettering. The process of removing stone from the earth is called mining or quarrying.

Stone carving is one of the processes which may be used by an artist when creating a sculpture. The term also refers to the activity of masons in dressing stone blocks for use in architecture, building or civil engineering. It is also a phrase used by archaeologists, historians, and anthropologists to describe the activity involved in making some types of petroglyphs.

== History ==
The earliest known works of representational art are stone carvings. Often marks carved into rock or petroglyphs will survive where painted work will not. Prehistoric Venus figurines such as the Venus of Berekhat Ram may be as old as 250,000 years, and are carved in stones such as tuff and limestone.

These earliest examples of the stone carving are the result of hitting or scratching a softer stone with a harder one, although sometimes more resilient materials such as antlers are known to have been used for relatively soft stone. Another early technique was to use an abrasive that was rubbed on the stone to remove the unwanted area. Prior to the discovery of steel by any culture, all stone carving was carried out by using an abrasion technique, following rough hewing of the stone block using hammers. The reason for this is that bronze, the hardest available metal until steel, is not hard enough to work any but the softest stone. The Ancient Greeks used the ductility of bronze to trap small granules of carborundum, that are naturally occurring on the island of Milos, thus making a very efficient file for abrading the stone.

Qingtian stone carving artist Lin Rukui and his artwork "Sorghum", 1964

The development of iron made possible stone carving tools, such as chisels, drills and saws made from steel, that were capable of being hardened and tempered to a state hard enough to cut stone without deforming, while not being so brittle as to shatter. Carving tools have changed little since then.

Modern, industrial, large quantity techniques still rely heavily on abrasion to cut and remove stone, although at a significantly faster rate with processes such as water erosion and diamond saw cutting.

One modern stone carving technique uses a new process: The technique of applying sudden high temperature to the surface. The expansion of the top surface due to the sudden increase in temperature causes it to break away. On a small scale, Oxy-acetylene torches are used. On an industrial scale, lasers are used. On a massive scale, carvings such as the Crazy Horse Memorial carved from the Harney Peak granite of Mount Rushmore and the Confederate Memorial Park in Albany, Georgia are produced using jet heat torches.

== Stone sculpture ==
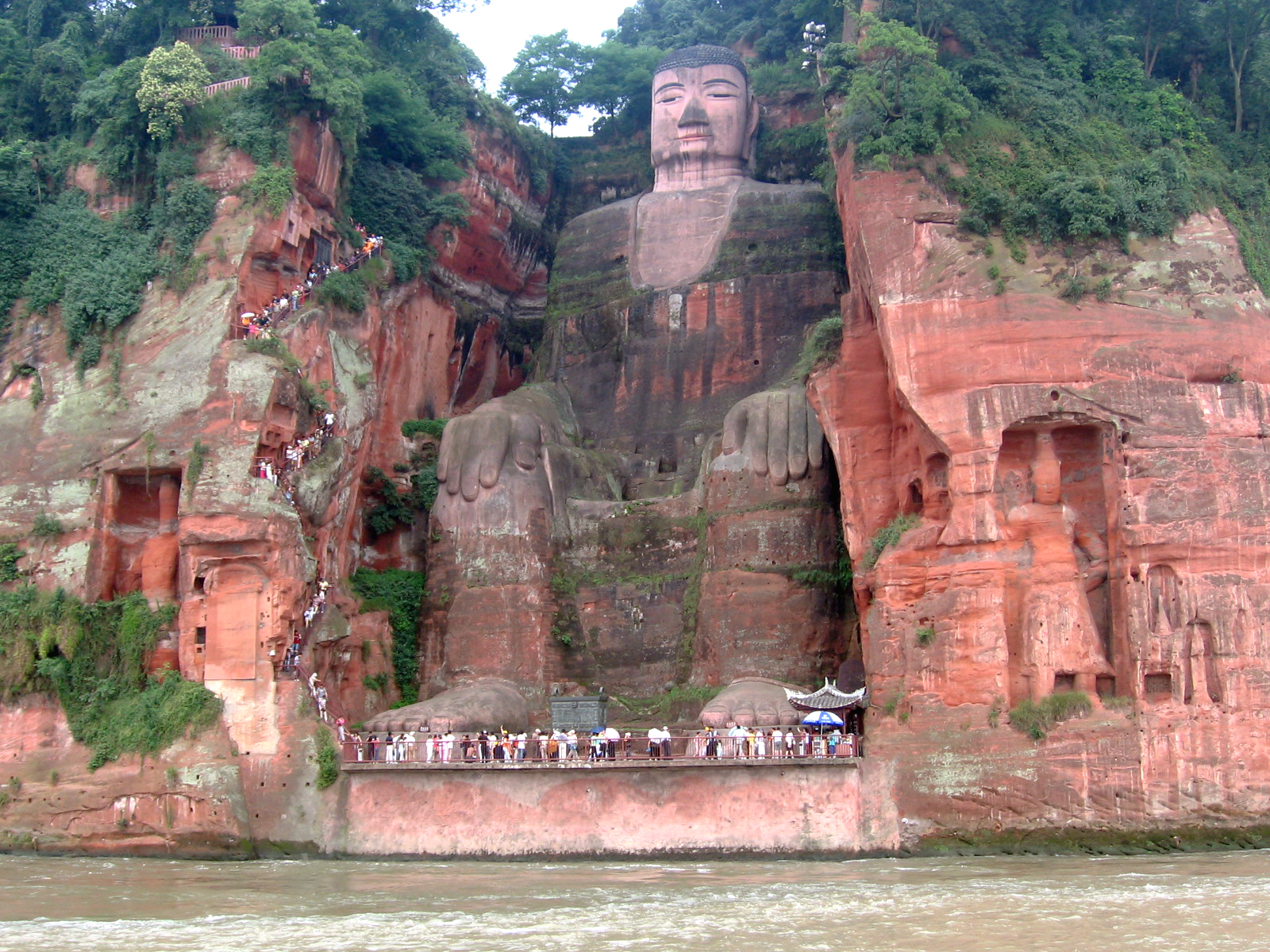
The Tang dynasty Leshan Giant Buddha, near Leshan in Sichuan province, China. Construction began in 713, and was completed in 803. It is the largest stone-carved Buddha in the world.

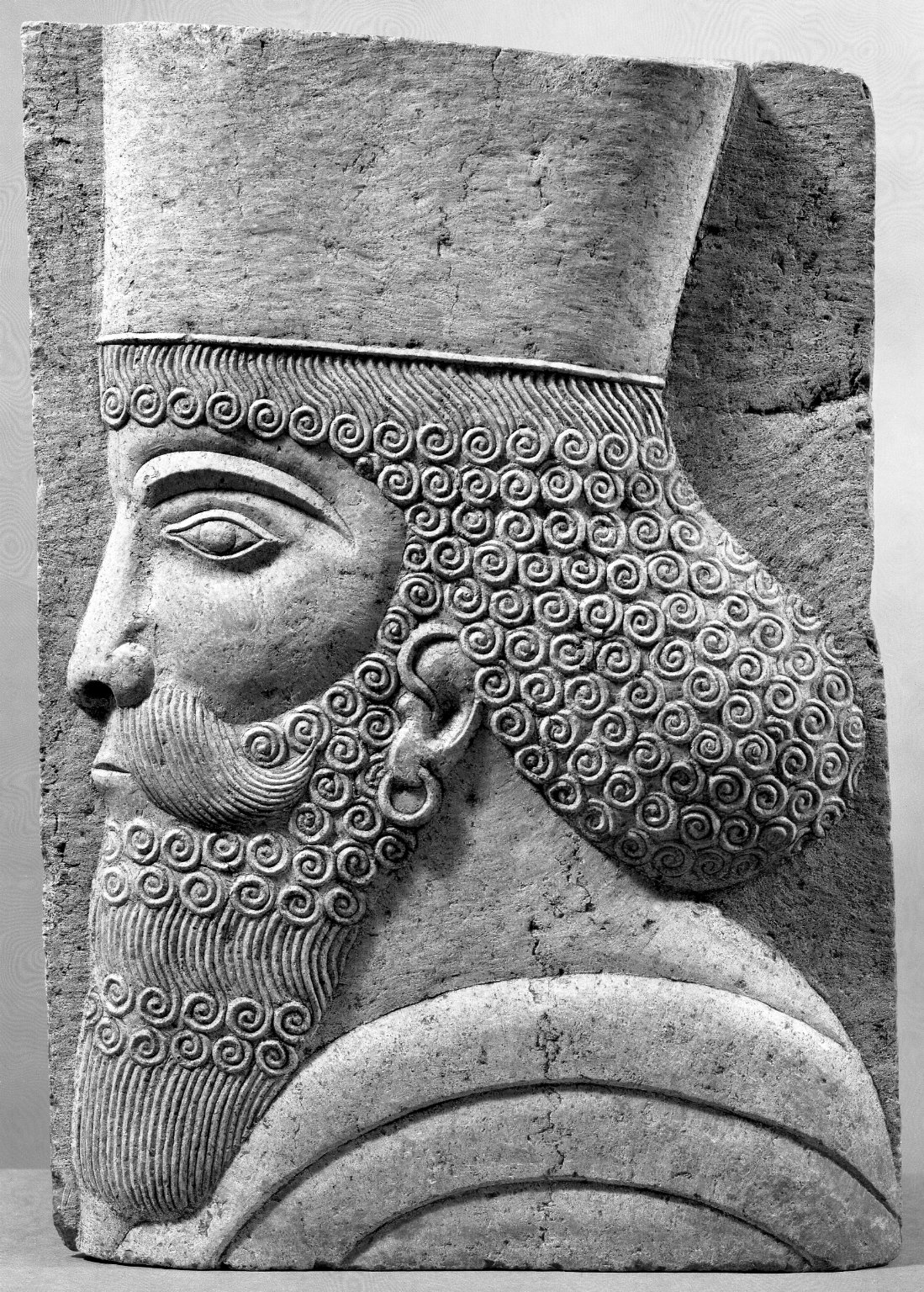
Bas-Relief, late 19th century CE. Limestone. Brooklyn Museum

Carving stone into sculpture is an activity older than civilization itself. Prehistoric sculptures were usually human forms, such as the Venus of Willendorf and the faceless statues of the Cycladic cultures. Later cultures devised animal, human-animal and abstract forms in stone. The earliest cultures used abrasive techniques, and modern technology employs pneumatic hammers and other devices. But for most of human history, sculptors used hammer and chisel as the basic tools for carving stone.

The process begins with the selection of a stone for carving. Some artists use the stone itself as inspiration; the Renaissance artist Michelangelo claimed that his job was to free the human form trapped inside the block. Other artists begin with a form already in mind and find a stone to complement their vision. The sculptor may begin by forming a model in clay or wax, sketching the form of the statue on paper or drawing a general outline of the statue on the stone itself.

When ready to carve, the artist usually begins by knocking off large portions of unwanted stone. This is the "roughing out" stage of the sculpting process. For this task they may select a point chisel, which is a long, hefty piece of steel with a point at one end and a broad striking surface at the other. A pitching tool may also be used at this early stage; which is a wedge-shaped chisel with a broad, flat edge. The pitching tool is useful for splitting the stone and removing large, unwanted chunks. Those two chisels are used in combination with a masons driving hammer.

Once the general shape of the statue has been determined, the sculptor uses other tools to refine the figure. A toothed chisel or claw chisel has multiple gouging surfaces which create parallel lines in the stone. These tools are generally used to add texture to the figure. An artist might mark out specific lines by using calipers to measure an area of stone to be addressed, and marking the removal area with pencil, charcoal or chalk. The stone carver generally uses a shallower stroke at this point in the process, usually in combination with a wooden mallet.

Eventually the sculptor has changed the stone from a rough block into the general shape of the finished statue. Tools called rasps and rifflers are then used to enhance the shape into its final form. A rasp is a flat, steel tool with a coarse surface. The sculptor uses broad, sweeping strokes to remove excess stone as small chips or dust. A riffler is a smaller variation of the rasp, which can be used to create details such as folds of clothing or locks of hair.

The final stage of the carving process is polishing. Sandpaper can be used as a first step in the polishing process, or sand cloth. Emery, a stone that is harder and rougher than the sculpture media, is also used in the finishing process. This abrading, or wearing away, brings out the color of the stone, reveals patterns in the surface and adds a sheen. Tin and iron oxides are often used to give the stone a highly reflective exterior.

Sculptures can be carved via either the direct or the indirect carving method. Indirect carving is a way of carving by using an accurate clay, wax or plaster model, which is then copied with the use of a compass or proportional dividers or a pointing machine. The direct carving method is a way of carving in a more intuitive way, without first making an elaborate model. Sometimes a sketch on paper or a rough clay draft is made.

== Stone carving considerations ==
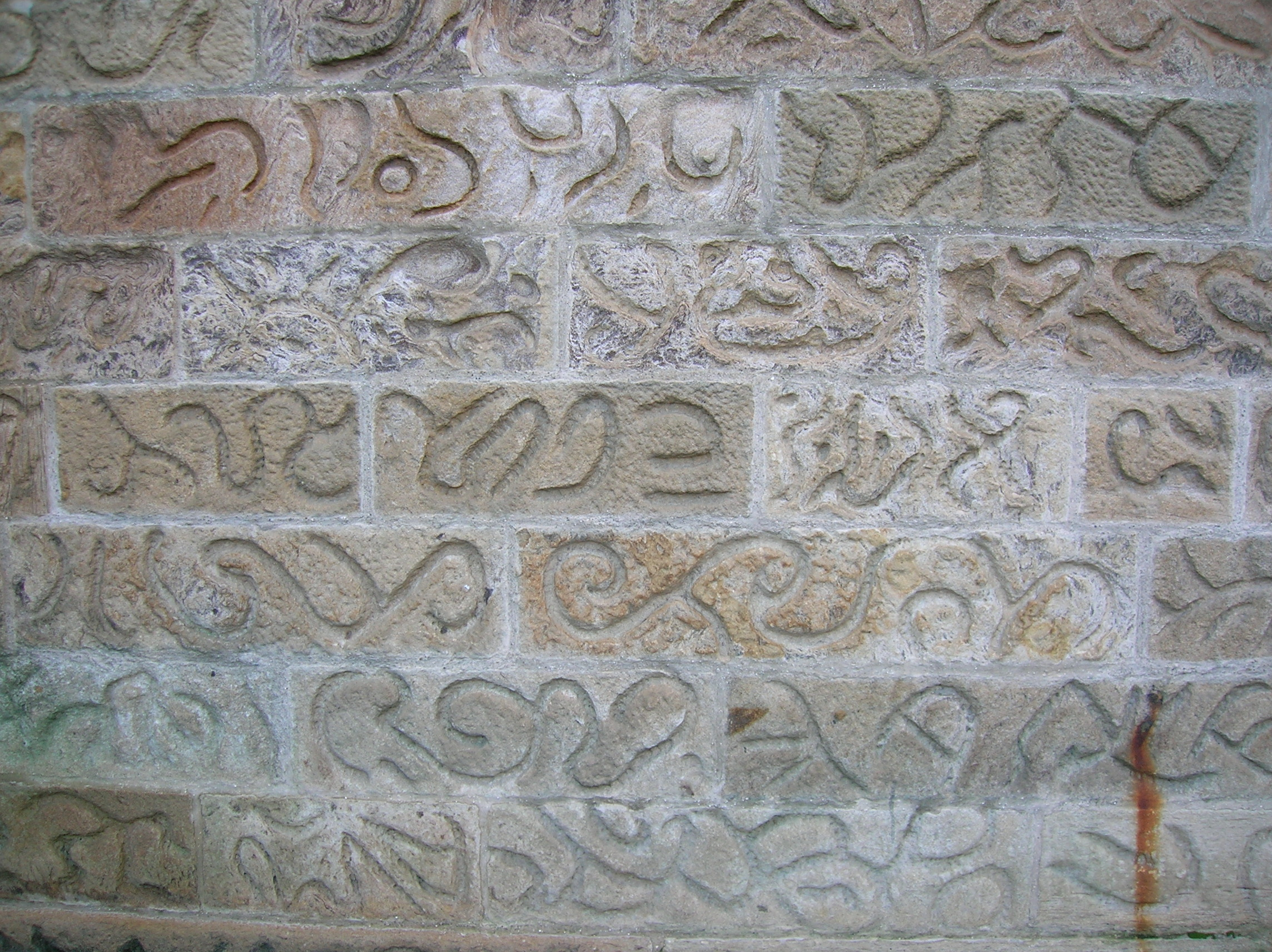
'Arabic' style carving on ashlar building blocks, Beith, Scotland

Stone has been used for carving since ancient times for many reasons. Most types of stone are easier to find than metal ores, which have to be mined and smelted. Stone can be dug from the surface and carved with hand tools. Stone is more durable than wood, and carvings in stone last much longer than wooden artifacts. Stone comes in many varieties and artists have abundant choices in color, quality and relative hardness.

Soft stone such as chalk, soapstone, pumice and Tufa can be easily carved with found items such as harder stone or in the case of chalk even the fingernail. Limestones and marbles can be worked using abrasives and simple iron tools. Granite, basalt and some metamorphic stone is difficult to carve even with iron or steel tools; usually tungsten carbide tipped tools are used, although abrasives still work well. Modern techniques often use abrasives attached to machine tools to cut the stone.

Precious and semi-precious gemstones are also carved into delicate shapes for jewellery or larger items, and polished; this is sometimes referred to as lapidary, although strictly speaking lapidary refers to cutting and polishing alone.

When worked, some stones release dust that can damage lungs (silica crystals are usually to blame), so a respirator is sometimes needed.

== Stone shaping and tools ==
Basic stone carving tools fall into five categories:

- Percussion tools for hitting - such as mallets, axes, adzes, bouchards and toothed hammers.
- Tools for rough shaping of stone, to form a block the size needed for the carving. These include feathers and wedges and pitching tools.
- Chisels for cutting - such as lettering chisels, points, pitching tools, and claw chisels. Chisels, in turn, may be handheld and hammered or pneumatic powered.
- Diamond tools which include burrs, cup wheels, and blades mounted on a host of power tools. These are used sometimes through the entire carving process from rough work to the final finish.
- Abrasives for material removals - such as carborundum blocks, drills, saws, grinding and cutting wheels, water-abrasive machinery and dressing tools such as French and English drags.

More advanced processes, such as laser cutting and jet torches, use sudden high temperature with a combination of cooling water to spall flakes of stone. Other modern processes may involve diamond-wire machines or other large scale production equipment to remove large sections of undesired stone.

The use of chisels for stone carving is possible in several ways. Two are:

- The mason's stroke, in which a flat chisel is used at approximately 90 degrees to the surface in an organized sweep. It shatters the stone beneath it and each successive pass lowers the surface.
- The lettering stroke, in which the chisel is used along the surface at approximately 30 degrees to cut beneath the existing surface.

There are many types and styles of stone carving tools, each carver will decide for themselves which tools to use. Traditionalists might use hand tools only.

- Lettering chisels for incising small strokes create the details of letters in larger applications.
- Fishtail carving chisels are used to create pockets, valleys and for intricate carving, whilst providing good visibility around the stone.
- Masonry chisels are used for the general shaping of stones.
- Stone point tools are used to rough out the surface of the stone.
- Stone claw tools are used to remove the peaks and troughs left from the previously used tools.
- Stone pitching tools are used to remove large quantities of stone.
- Stone nickers are used to split stones by tracing a line along the stone with progressive strikes until the stone breaks along the line.

Powered pneumatic hammers make the hard work easier. Progress on shaping stone is faster with pneumatic carving tools. Air hammers (such as Cuturi) place many thousands of impacts per minute upon the end of the tool, which would usually be manufactured or modified to suit the purpose. This type of tool creates the ability to 'shave' the stone, providing a smooth and consistent stroke, allowing for larger surfaces to be worked.

Among modern tool types, there are two main stone carving chisels:

- Heat treated high carbon steel tools - Generally forged
- Tungsten carbide tipped tools - Generally forged, slotted, and carbide inserts brazed in to provide a harder and longer-wearing cutting edge.

== Gallery ==
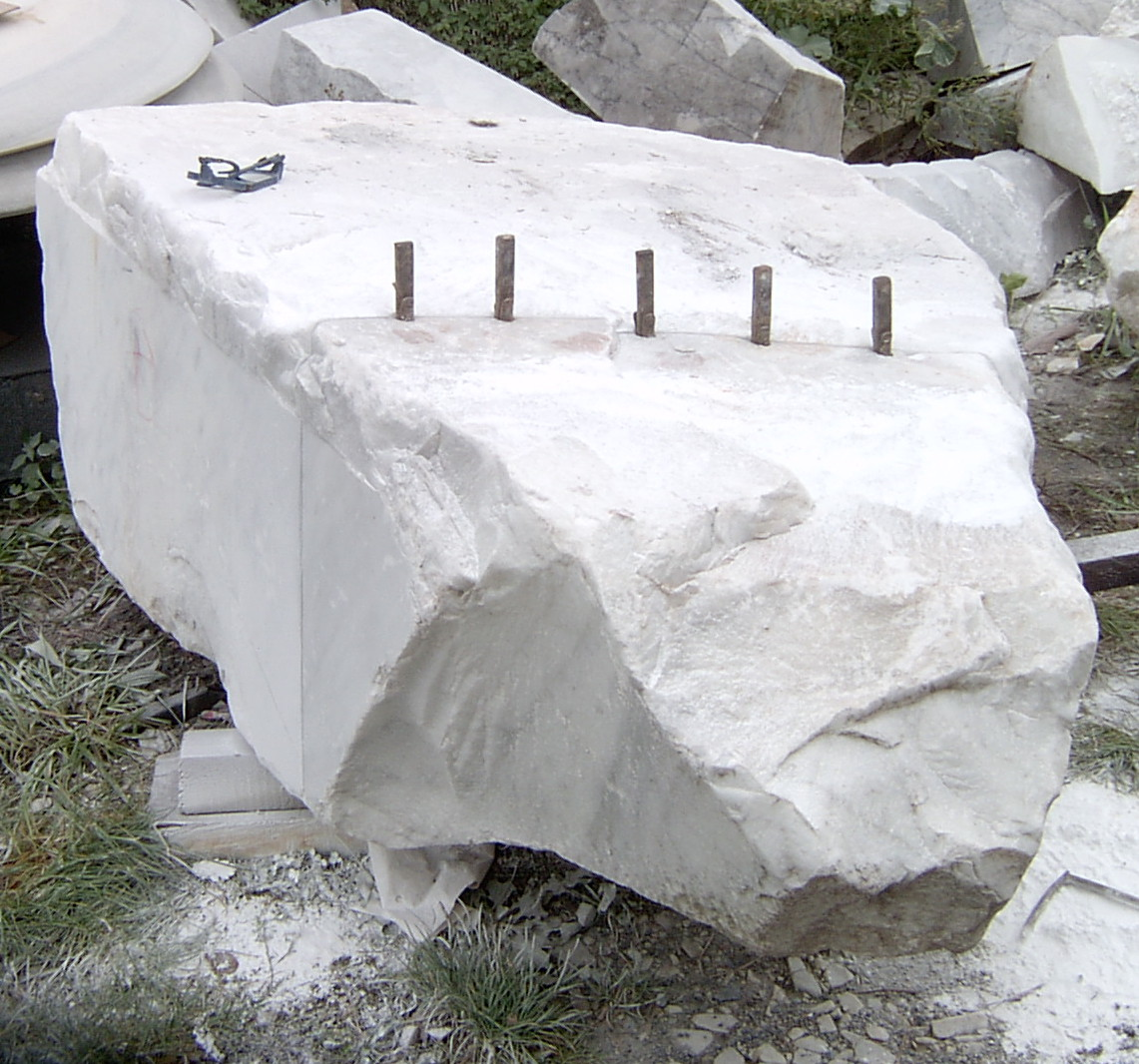
Using plug and feathers to split a block of marble from the quarry

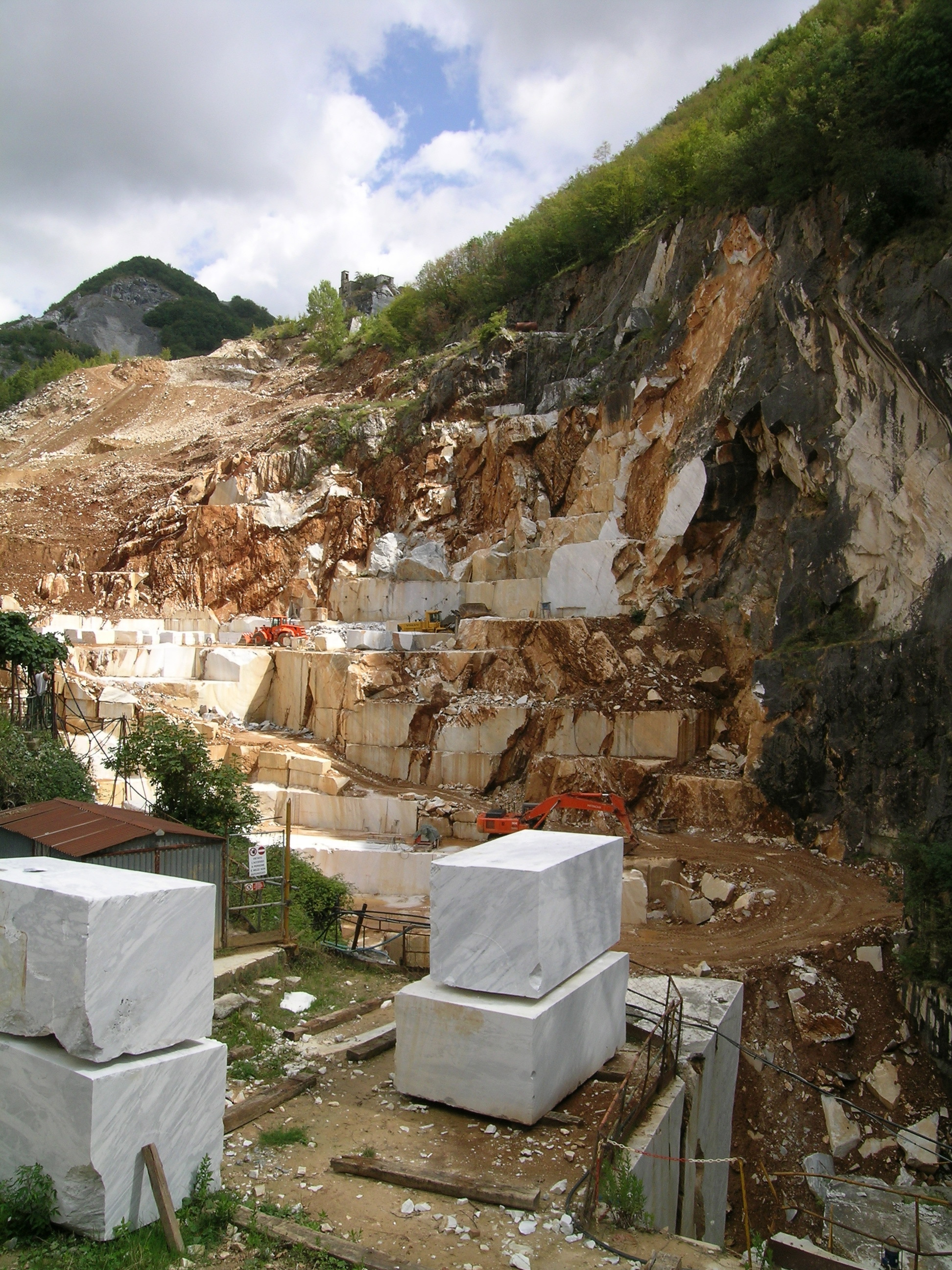
Carrara marble quarry

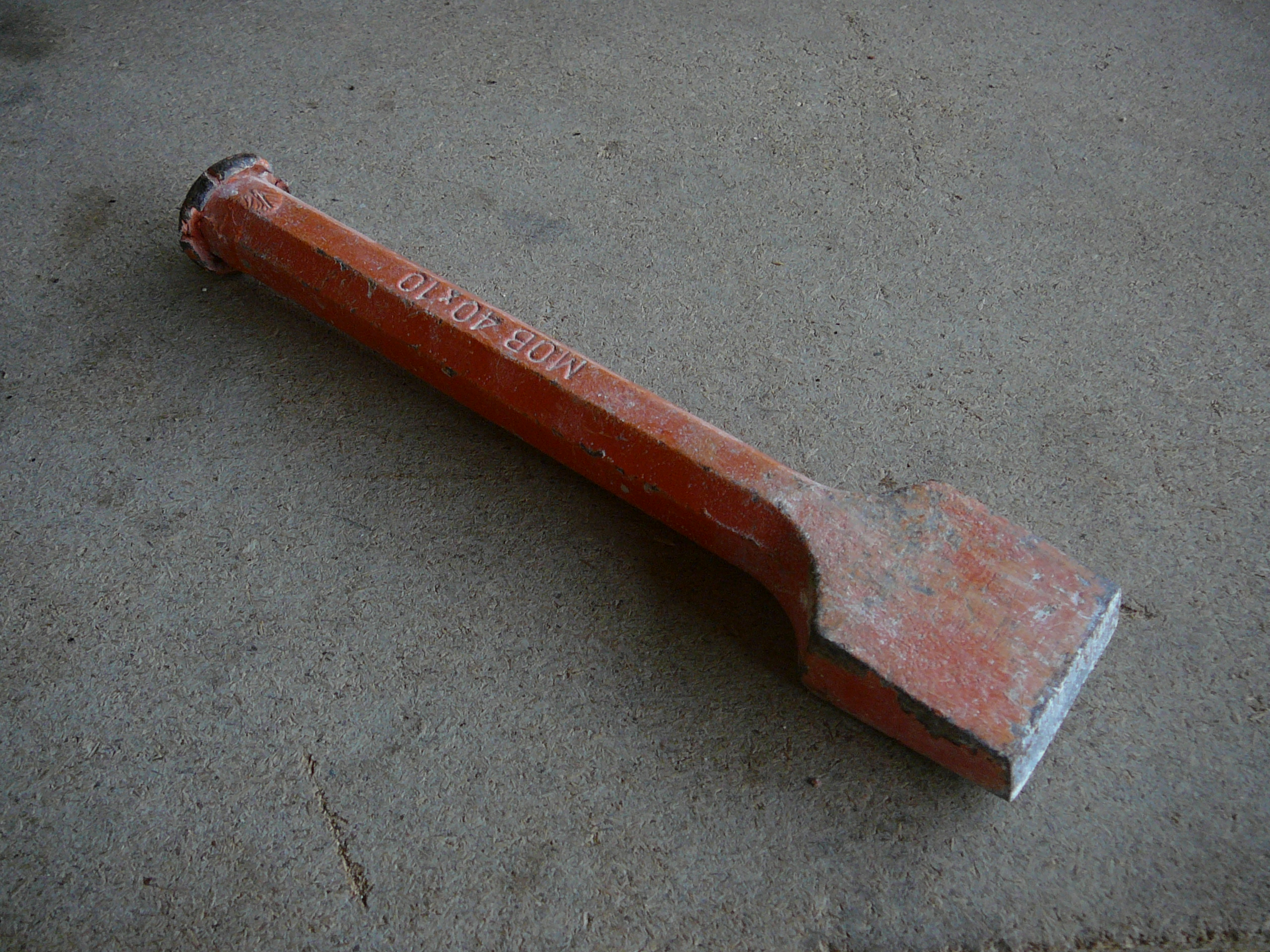
Pitching tool used in preliminary rough shaping blocks of stone

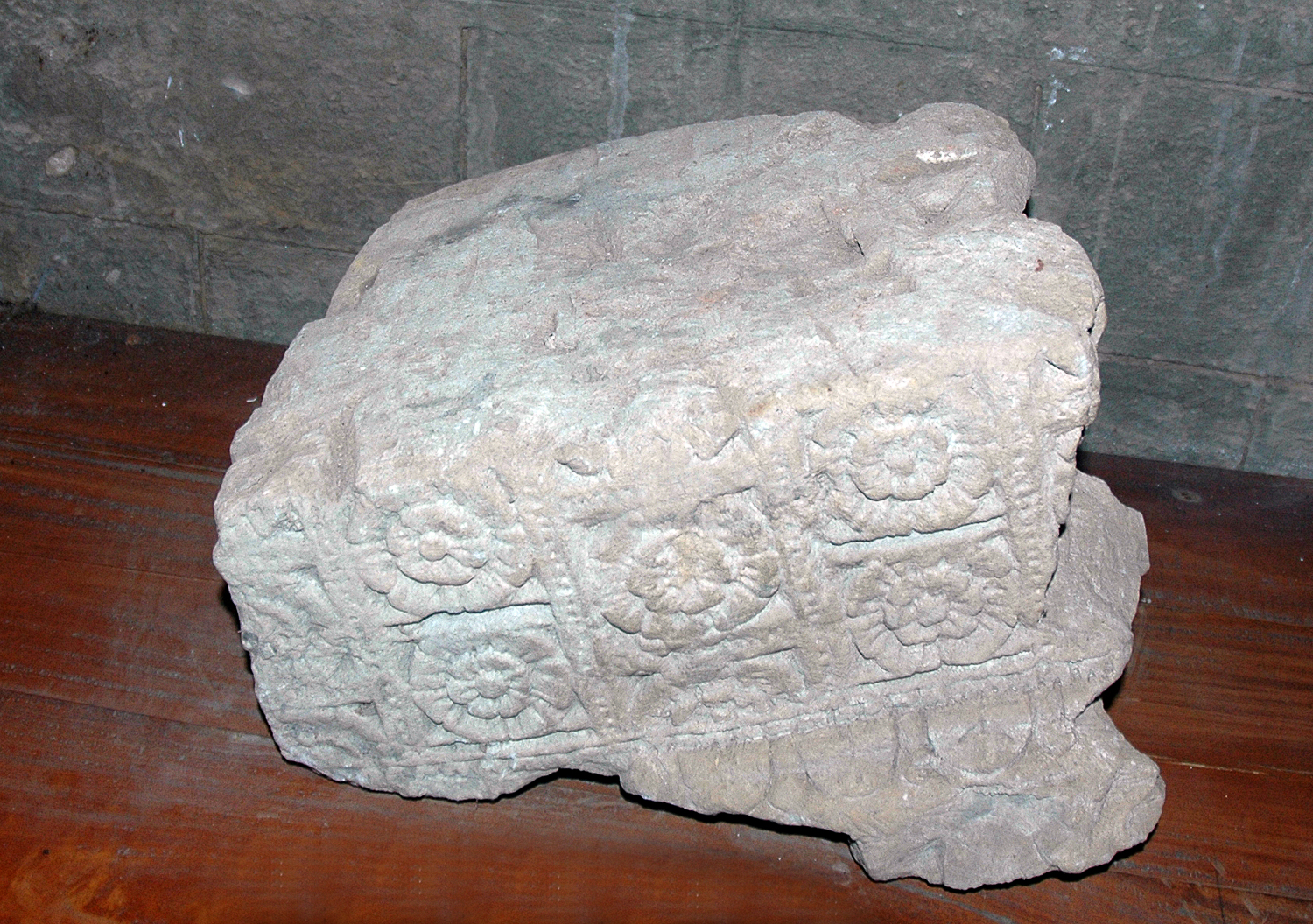
Carved flower on stone, ancient work, Archaeological museum of Jaffna, Sri Lanka

Carved sculpture, ancient work, from Chichen Itza, Mexico

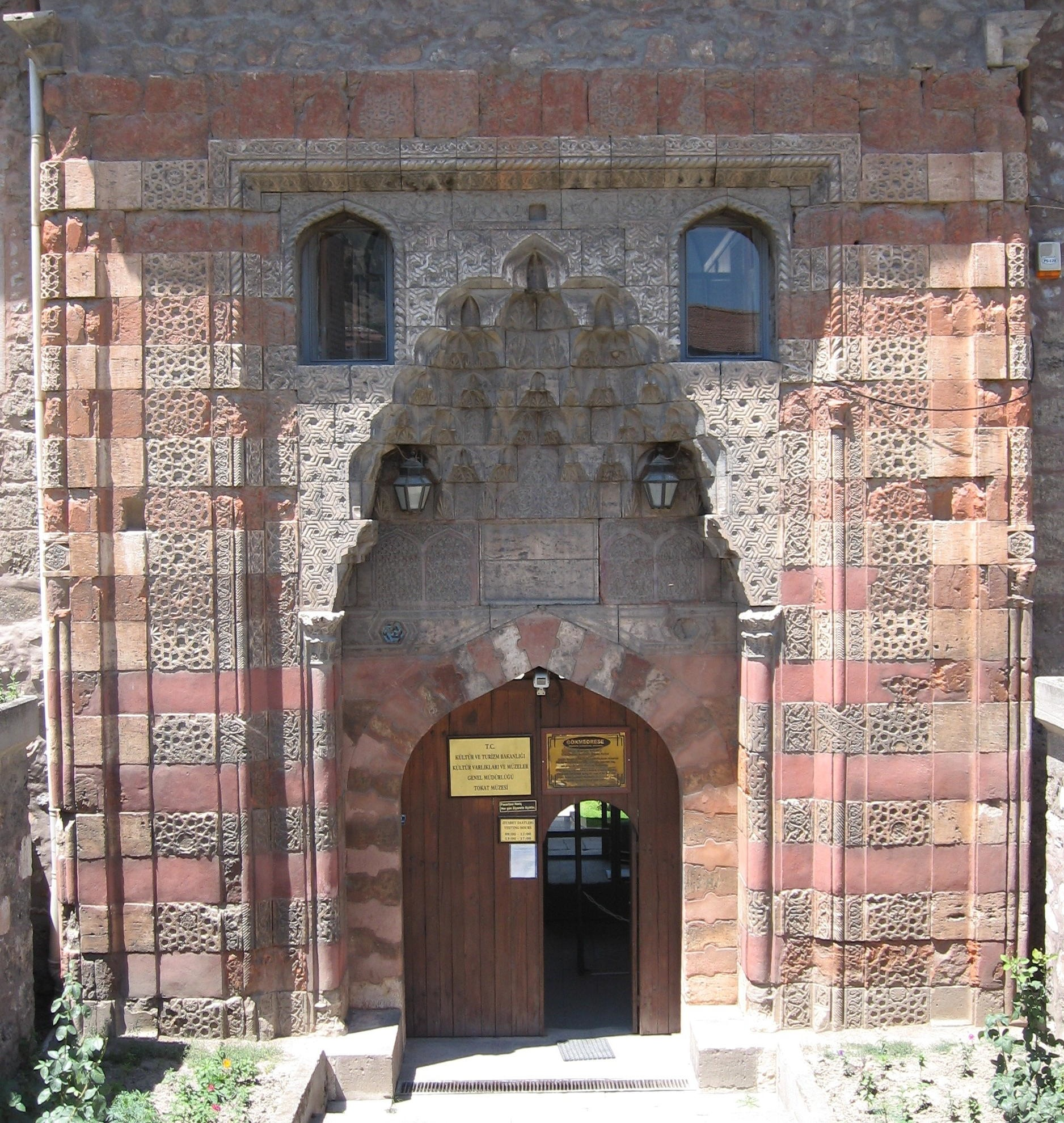
Seljuk Gök Medrese in Tokat, Turkey

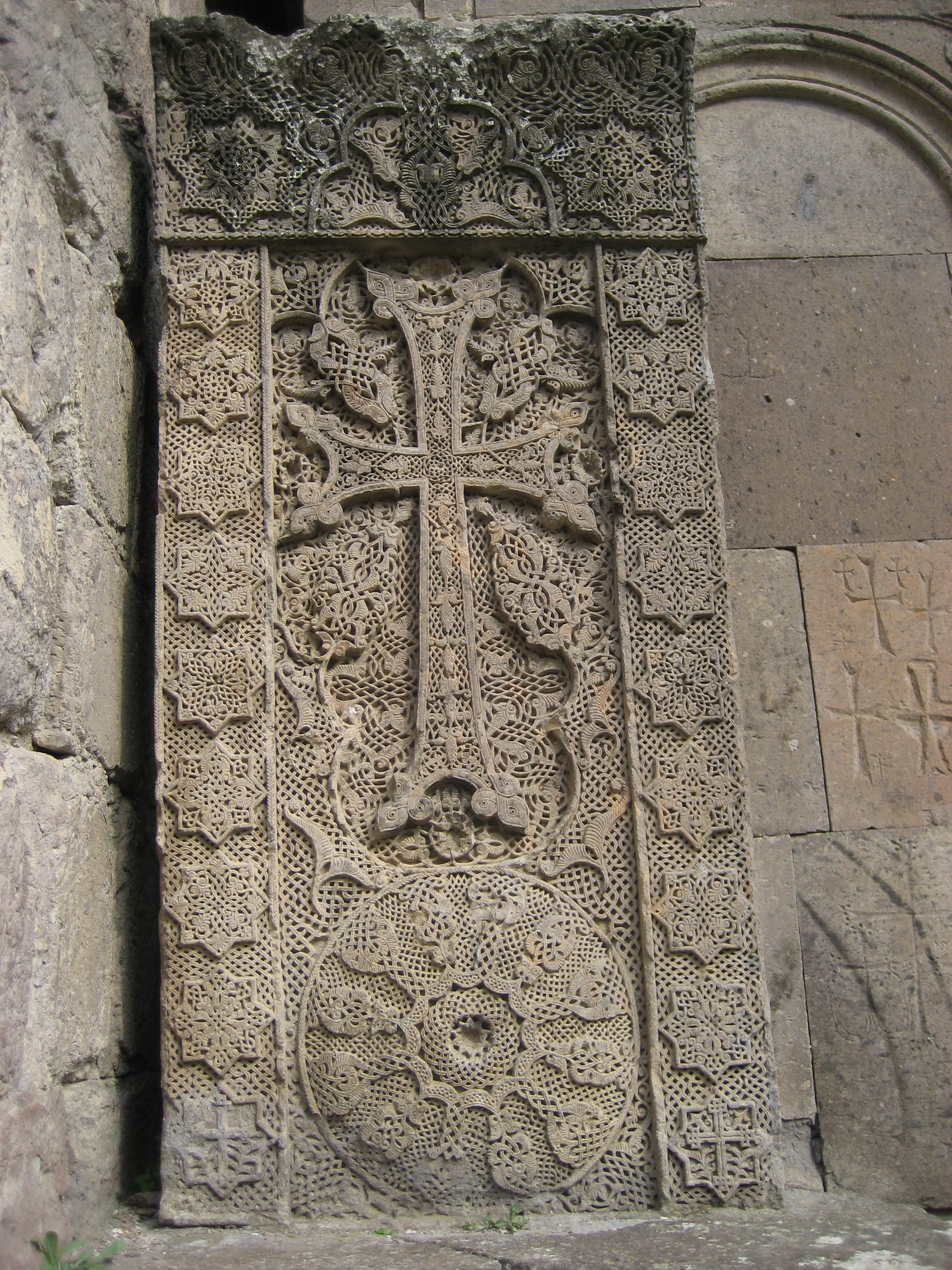
A famous khachkar at Goshavank Armenia

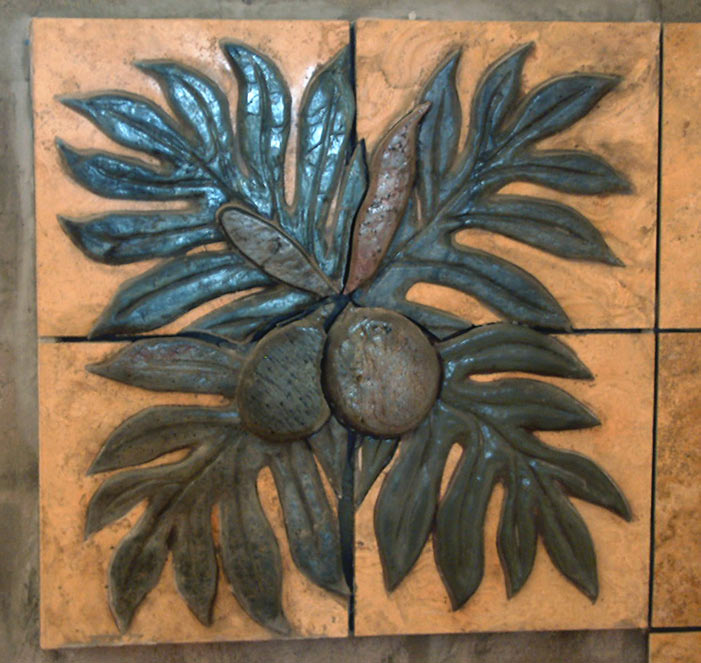
Diamond blade and bit method: 3D carved slate and travertine Breadfruit wall mural by Janna Morrison, 2007, Maui, Hawaii

== See also ==
- Chalk carving
- List of colossal sculptures in situ
- Khachkar
- Megalith
- Rock-cut architecture
- Stone sculpture
- Stonemasonry
- The Stonemason (2020 book)
- Songjiang Tangjing Building
