= Drifter drill =

Hydraulic or pneumatic powered rock or ground drill

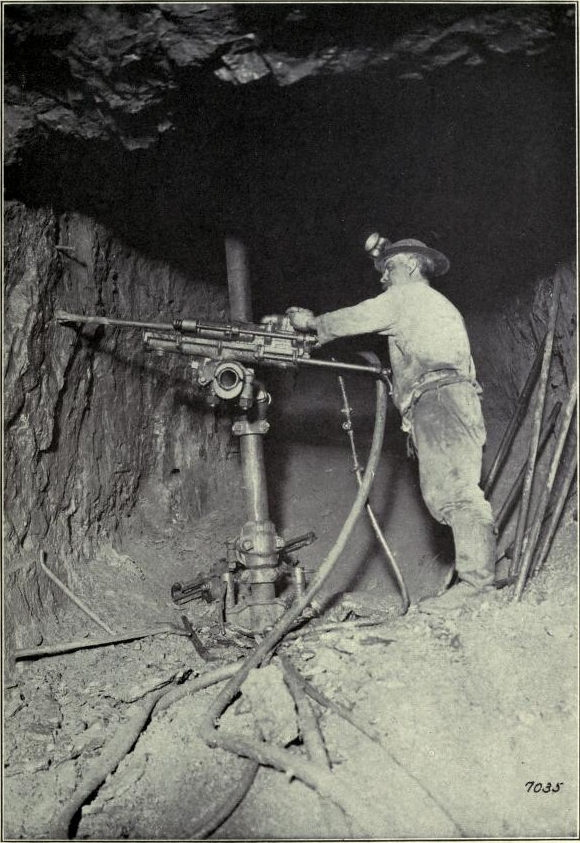
Power rock drill, mounted on a column, in operation in a mine

A drifter drill, sometimes simply called a rock drill, is a tool used in mining and civil engineering to drill into rock. Rock drills are used for making holes for placing dynamite or other explosives in rock blasting, and holes for plug and feather quarrying.

While a rock drill may be as simple as a specialized form of chisel, it may also take the form of a powered machine. The mechanism may be worked or powered by hand, by steam, by compressed air (pneumatics), by hydraulics, or by electricity.

Machine rock drills come in two basic forms: those that operate by percussion (using a reciprocating motion), and those that are abrasive (using a rotary motion). A smaller, hand-held percussion rock drill is considered a type of jackhammer.

== History and types ==
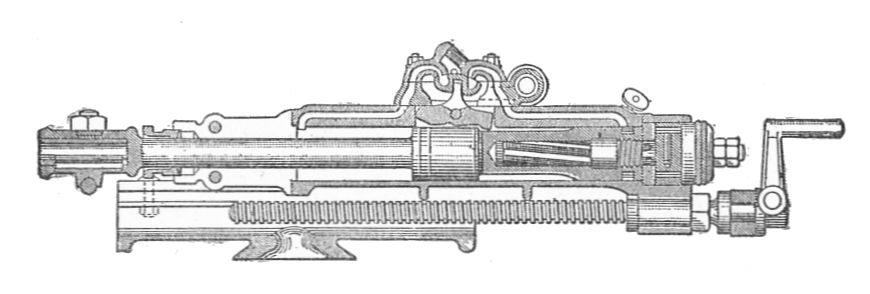
A pneumatic rock drill. The detacheable drill bit is not shown, but would be at left. At the bottom is the feed-screw (worked by the crank at right), which advances the drill as the hole deepens. The mounting point is at the bottom.

The simplest form of rock drill consists of a long chisel or drill steel that was struck with a sledgehammer. Mark Twain, who worked unsuccessfully as a silver miner in the early 1860s before taking up journalism, described the process: "One of us held the iron drill in its place and another would strike with an eight-pound sledge--it was like driving nails on a large scale. In the course of an hour or two the drill would reach a depth of two or three feet, making a hole a couple of inches in diameter." This hole was then filled with the blasting powder. In "jump-driving", a team of 2-4 men worked a single hole, each taking turns pounding. Around 1900, the average jump-driver could produce 50 feet (15 m) of hole a day.

Powered rock drills eventually replaced the manual use of a chisel to bore holes by the turn of the 20th century. The dramatic differences between the hand steel and power drills was the basis for the legend of American folk hero John Henry, who according to folklore undertook a competition pitting his hand steel against a steam power drill, only to collapse dead when victorious.

The first steam drill was developed in 1813 by Richard Trevithick. Steam drills found greater use in surface quarries than in underground mines, as there they could be much closer to the requisite boilers.

All rock drills produce dust which is hazardous to inhale, causing widespread silicosis among ancient miners. Modern rock drills flood the borehole with water to capture the dust and improve the air quality in the mine. This has the additional benefits of lubricating and cooling the drill bit. In 1867, French civil engineer M. Leschott introduced the diamond drill bit.

== Configurations ==
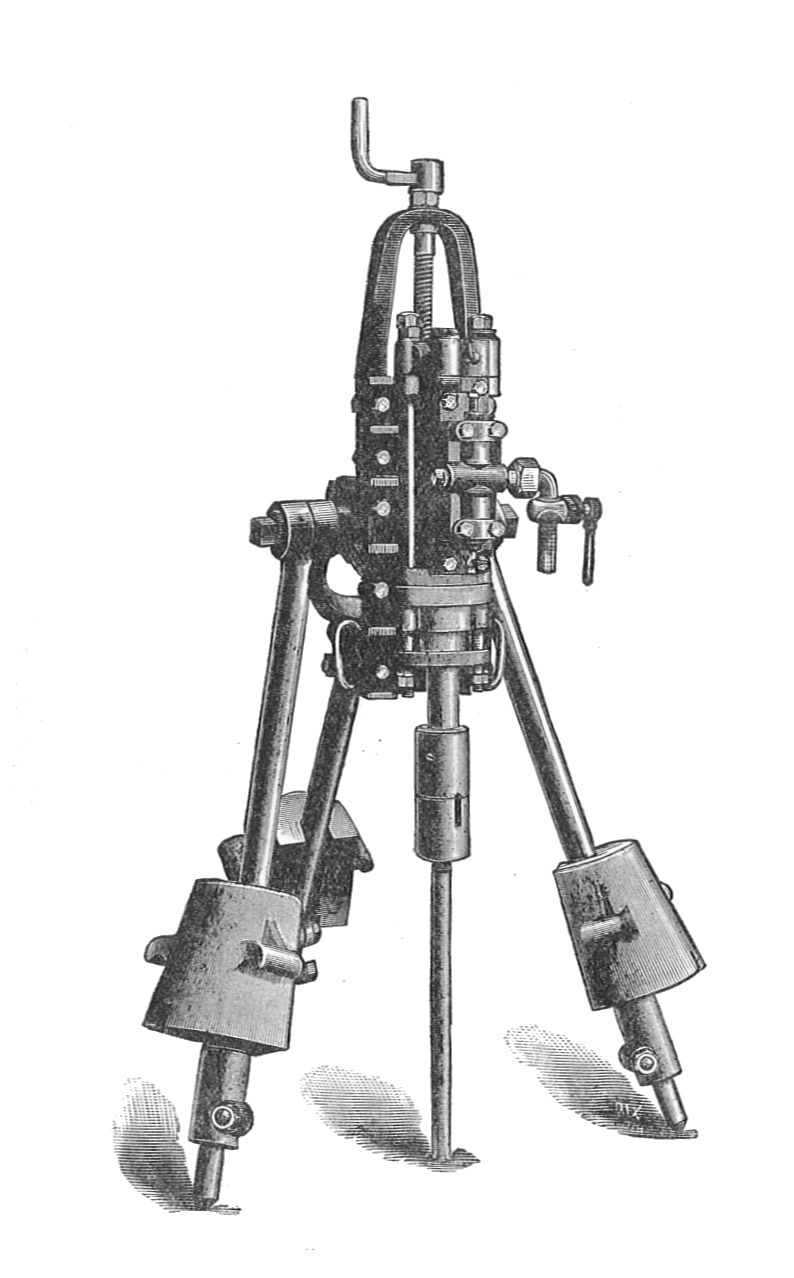
Rock drill mounted on a tripod. The large objects on the legs are weights to anchor it down into position

In reciprocating power drills, the drilling cylinder is mounted on a feed-screw, such that as the hole is drilled and the drilling point recedes from the rock face, the drill-bit continues to move into it, while the anchor point (on the tripod or column) remains in place. The drill bit has to be changed out for a longer one every 12 to 30 inches (30 to 76 cm), depending on the length of the feed screw.

Rock drills may be mounted for anchoring against the rockface in several different ways. For downward vertical drilling, particularly in quarrying, rock drills may be mounted on tripods with attached weights so as to provide sufficient pressure against the surface. For horizontal drilling, jack mounts or columns may be used, which lock into the ceiling and floor for the drill to push against.

A quarry bar consists of a rock drill mounted to a long rod, such that the rock drill may be moved along it. This tool is used in quarrying to produce a straight row of holes, such as for use with the plug and feather to split the stone along the given line.

== Drill bits ==
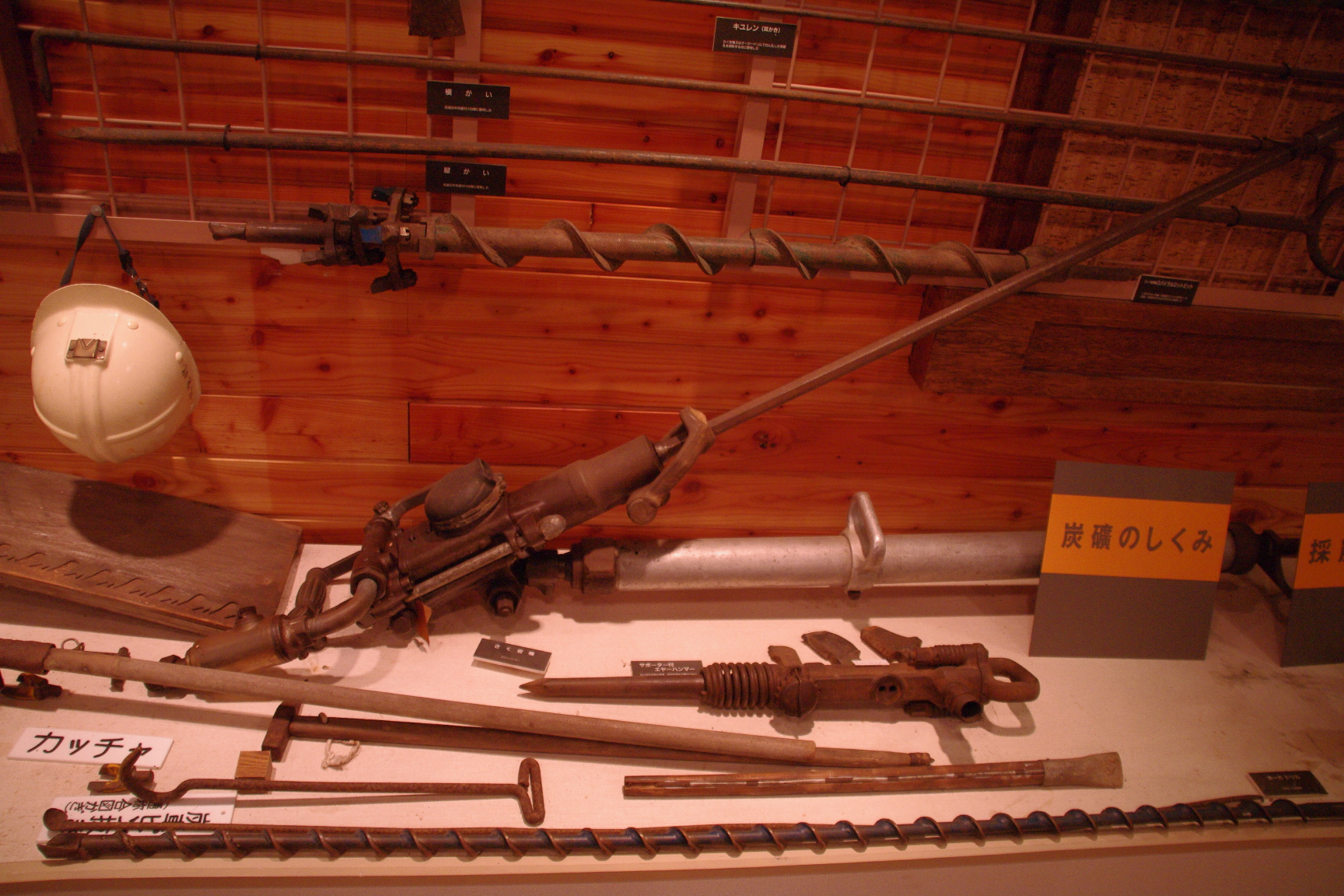
Various rock drills and bits at a museum in Japan

Rock is hard and would quickly wear out a plain steel drill bit. Typically the drill is tipped with an insert of a much harder material that can be replaced as it wears away, such as tungsten carbide. The differential wear between different bits used to make a single hole could result in an uneven hole in which a blasting charge might not properly fit. This was a potentially dangerous situation with relatively unstable explosives, such as dynamite, if they were forced. To prevent this, a tool was used for measuring the individual bits and the hole.

Rotary rock drills often use bits coated in diamond (in the form of bort). The diamonds are set into metal or ceramic such that the harder diamond protrudes as the softer material wears, shielding the bulk from further wear until the diamond slowly wears away. For drilling through ice or frozen soil, heated drill bits may be used.

== Early rock drills ==
In 1849, J. J. Couch, an American inventor from Philadelphia, received the first patent for a rock drill. It featured a drill rod which passed through a hollow piston and was thrown against the rock.

In 1851, James Fowle received a patent for a rock drill powered by steam or compressed air.

== See also ==
- Churn drill
- John Henry (folklore)
