= Non-explosive demolition agents =

Chemical mixtures that expand on setting in drilled holes to split rock

Non-explosive demolition agents are chemicals that are an alternative to explosives and gas pressure blasting products in demolition, mining, and quarrying. To use non-explosive demolition agents in demolition or quarrying, holes are drilled in the base rock as they would be for use with conventional explosives. A slurry mixture of the non-explosive demolition agent and water is poured into the drill holes. Over the next few hours the slurry expands, cracking the rock in a pattern somewhat like the cracking that would occur from conventional explosives.

Non-explosive demolition agents offer many advantages including that they are silent and do not produce vibration the way a conventional explosive would. In some applications conventional explosives are more economical than non-explosive demolition agents. In many countries these are available without restriction, unlike explosives which are highly regulated.

The active ingredient is typically calcium oxide, "burnt lime," and is typically mixed with Portland cement and modifiers.

These agents are much safer than explosives, but they have to be used as directed to avoid steam explosions during the first few hours after being placed.

Typical applications / parameters
Application	Parameter				Usage amount (kg/m^{3})
Application	Aperture (mm)	Pitch-row (cm)	Array pitch (cm)	Bore depth	Usage amount (kg/m^{3})
Light Rock	30–45	30–50	30–50	H	8–10
Medium-hard Rock	30–45	25–40	20–35	1.05H	10–15
Hard Granite	35–45	20–40	20–30	1.05H	18–20
Rock Cutting	30–40	20–35	50-80	H	5–15
Unreinforced Concrete and Boulder Stones	35–50	20–30	25–35	0.9H	8–15
Reinforced Concrete	30–45	15–25	15–25	H	15–25

Many patents describe non-explosive demolition agents containing CaO, SiO_{2} and/or cement.

== See also ==
- Plug and feather
- Explosive material
- Mining
