= Songjiang Tangjing Building =

Chinese cultural relic

Songjiang Tang Jing Building
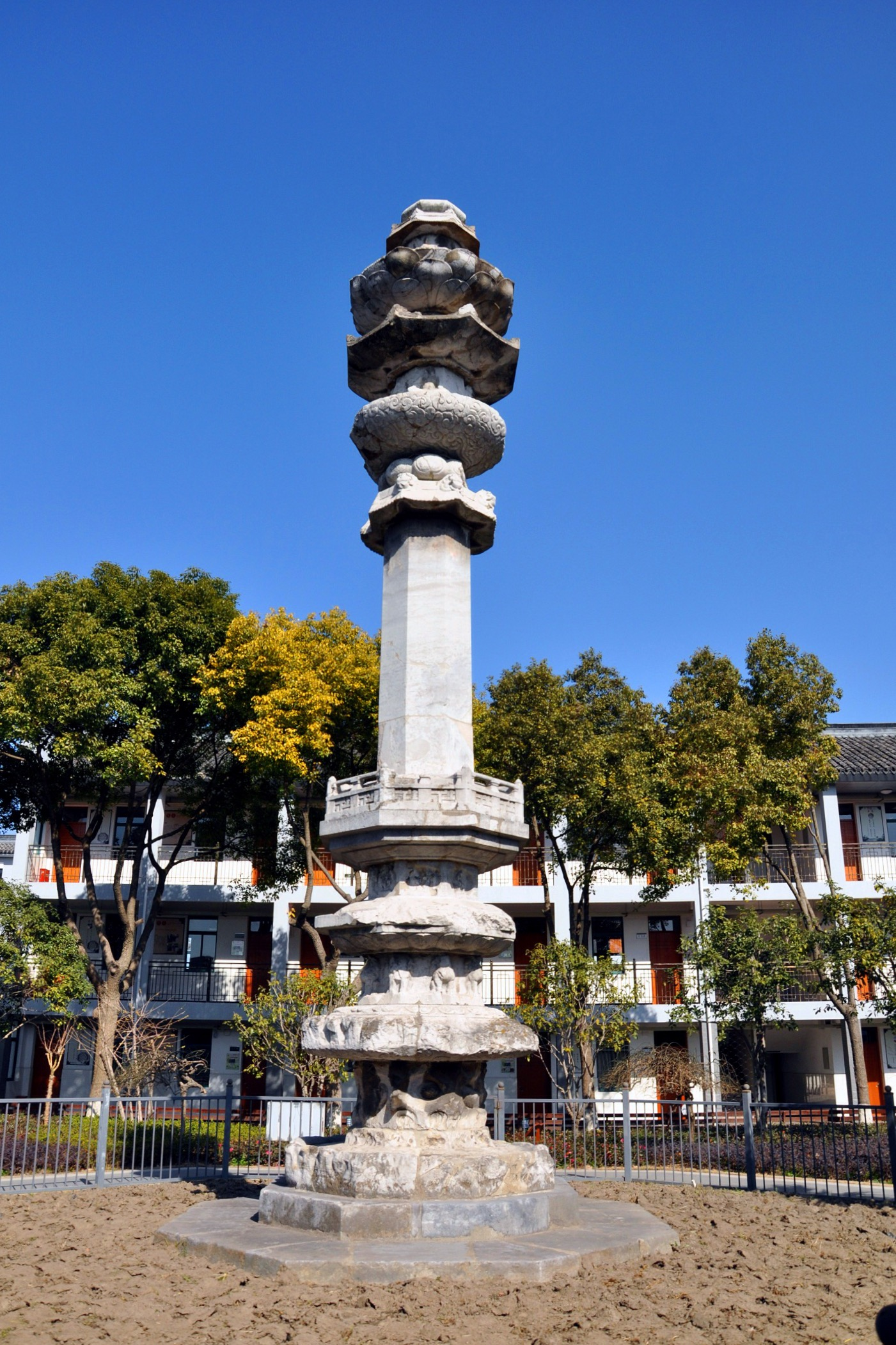
- National key cultural relics protection unit announced by the State Council of the People's Republic of China
- Interactive map of Songjiang Tang Jing Building
- Location: Songjiang District, Shanghai
- Coordinates: 31°00′28″N 121°14′14″E
- Type: Stone carvings and others
- Restored date: 1963

The Songjiang Tang Sutra Building, also known as Songjiang Tang Dynasty Dharana Sutra Stone Building, is located in the Zhongshan Primary School, Songjiang District, Shanghai, People's Republic of China, the oldest surviving above-ground relic in Shanghai, built in 859 AD. Since then, it has tilted due to age and weathering, and was restored in 1963. On January 13, 1988, it was announced as a national key cultural relic protection unit.

== History ==
The Songjiang Tang Sutra Building is the oldest terrestrial relic in Shanghai, also known as the Songjiang Tang Dharana Sutra Stone Building. According to the inscriptions on the body of the building, the Songjiang Tang Sutra Building was built in the 13th year of the Tang dynasty (859). It was built by local native Li Song for his deceased parents and his second brother Jianfu, and belongs to the category of tomb blocks. The earliest relevant record is found in the Yuan Zhiyuan Jiahe Zhi, while the Ming Chongzhen Songjiang Fu Zhi records the construction of the scripture building in the 13th year of Tang Dazhong (859). However, there are still many local legends about the construction of this scripture building, some claiming that the place where the scripture building was built was often flooded with water and the mud and stones could not be blocked, so the scripture building was built to seal it. There are also folk legends that this sutra building was built to suppress a local blackfish spirit. (Note: This kind of saying is widely spread, and there is a black fish lane for this reason.) In modern times, only a part of the block on the mound and the above 10 levels were exposed, while the block was cracked and destroyed in many places due to weathering, and only one-eighth of the original hook and bar part of the block was left intact. The warp block as a whole is also severely tilted, with a maximum offset of 23.93 cm. The condition inside the mound is unknown because it was not excavated at that time.

The base of the sutra building was once excavated from within the earth in 1959, but no large-scale, related cleaning and restoration work was carried out at that time. On September 7, 1962, the Songjiang Tang Sutra Building was listed under the name of "Tang Dharani Sutra Building", and the Shanghai Cultural Relics Custodianship Committee granted special funds to repair the Tang Sutra Building. During the dismantling process necessary for maintenance, 125 pieces of "Kaiyuan Tongbao", 8 pieces of "Qianyuan Chongbao" and 2 pieces of "Wu Baht" were found in the recesses of the top of the building. Copper coins were also found in the gap between the edges of several layers near the base, including one "Shengsong Yuanbao" and two "Chongning Tongbao". In November 1964, the restoration of the sutra building was completed. The repaired warp block is 1.6 meters above the ground. On December 7, 1977, the Songjiang Tang Sutra Building was again announced as a cultural relics protection unit of Shanghai under the name of "Tang Dharani Sutra Building". On January 13, 1988, the Songjiang Tangjing Building was announced by the State Council as the third batch of national key cultural relics protection units.

== Appearance ==
The Songjiang Tang Sutra Building has 21 surviving floors, all of which are octagonal in shape except for the 13th, 16th and 19th floors. (Note: The occlusal surface of the thirteenth layer is octagonal and the outer contour is round.) The bottom-up layers are in the following order:

- Base, 190 cm in diameter and 39 cm high, carved on the sides with a seawater motif;
- The second layer, 107 cm in diameter and 46 cm in height, on which are engraved coiled dragons;
- The third layer, 172 cm in diameter and 36.5 cm in height, with an image of Buddha on the side and a single petal of a supine lotus on the upper bevel;
- Fourth layer, 92.5 cm in diameter and 37.45 cm in height, with a seating lion carved on each of the eight sides;
- The fifth layer, 166 cm in diameter and 40 cm in height, with flowering plants and peonies carved in the shade on the upper bevel and lotus petals on the lower bevel;
- The sixth layer, 83.5 cm in diameter and 27 cm in height, with a pot door carved on each side and a cross-legged Bodhisattva sit in the middle of the pot door;
- Seventh layer, 159 cm in diameter and 29.5 cm in height, without patterns;
- The eighth floor, 152 cm in diameter and 36.5 cm in height, with a pillar at each corner and a stone column engraved with a hook and a slice pattern between each two pillars, with a shallow groove in the middle to accommodate the body of the building, surrounded by a pattern of 16 lotus petals engraved;
- The ninth layer, 76 cm in diameter and 46 cm in height, on which are engraved the names of the people who donated to the establishment of the sutra building during the Tang dynasty and the items donated Among them are "skirt", "quilt", "embroidered quilt", "long towel", "yellow shirt", "pants", "shirt", "hand towel", "silk". The list of donors totals 137 people, of whom 31 are women; a total of 13 people have official titles among the donors in mind, and the highest official rank held is the sixth rank and the lowest is the ninth rank;
- The tenth layer, 76 cm in diameter and 177 cm in height, with texts inscribed on each side, 10 lines on each side, of which the main west side is the sequence, the last six lines in the northwest direction bear in mind the construction of the building, and the rest of the sides are inscribed with sutras, the text of which is the Buddha's Dzogchen Dharani Sutra;
- Eleventh layer, 120.5 cm in diameter and 34 cm in height, with a lion's head carved into the lower end of each corner, each with a ring in its mouth;
- The twelfth layer, 89 cm in diameter and 27 cm in height, with a spherical curved surface protruding from each side, on which are carved lotus and Ruyi motifs;
- Thirteenth layer, 155 cm in diameter and 62 cm in height, with scrolling clouds carved on the outer curved surface;
- The fourteenth layer, 60 cm in diameter and 57.5 cm in height, each side inscribed with one of the Four Heavenly Kings;
- The fifteenth layer, 157.5 cm in diameter and 36.5 cm in height, is rafter-shaped, with the corners of the wings projecting outward and curving up, and the ends of the corners carved in the shape of a Ruyi;
- Sixteenth layer, 57 cm in diameter and 23.5 cm in height, with a coiled dragon carved on the outer curved surface;
- The seventeenth layer, 158 cm in diameter and 36 cm in height, carved with lotus petals in full bloom;
- The eighteenth layer, with an upper diameter of 70 cm, a lower diameter of 86 cm and a height of 17.5 cm, has a base without patterns;
- Nineteenth floor, 65 cm in diameter and 40 cm in height, with 16 relief figures carved on the outer curved surface, including Buddhas, Bodhisattvas, monarchs and ladies-in-waiting;
- The twentieth layer, 91 centimeters in diameter and 29 centimeters in height, carved with a Ruyi pattern for the upper and lower warped corners;
- The twenty-first layer, 64 cm in diameter and 18.2 cm in height, is a prismatic flat cover with no pattern.

In addition, the upper part of the pedestal has a return hook and corner pillar, and the pillar is connected to the platform, which originally housed eight statues of Buddha. (Note: It was later deposited in the Songjiang Museum.)

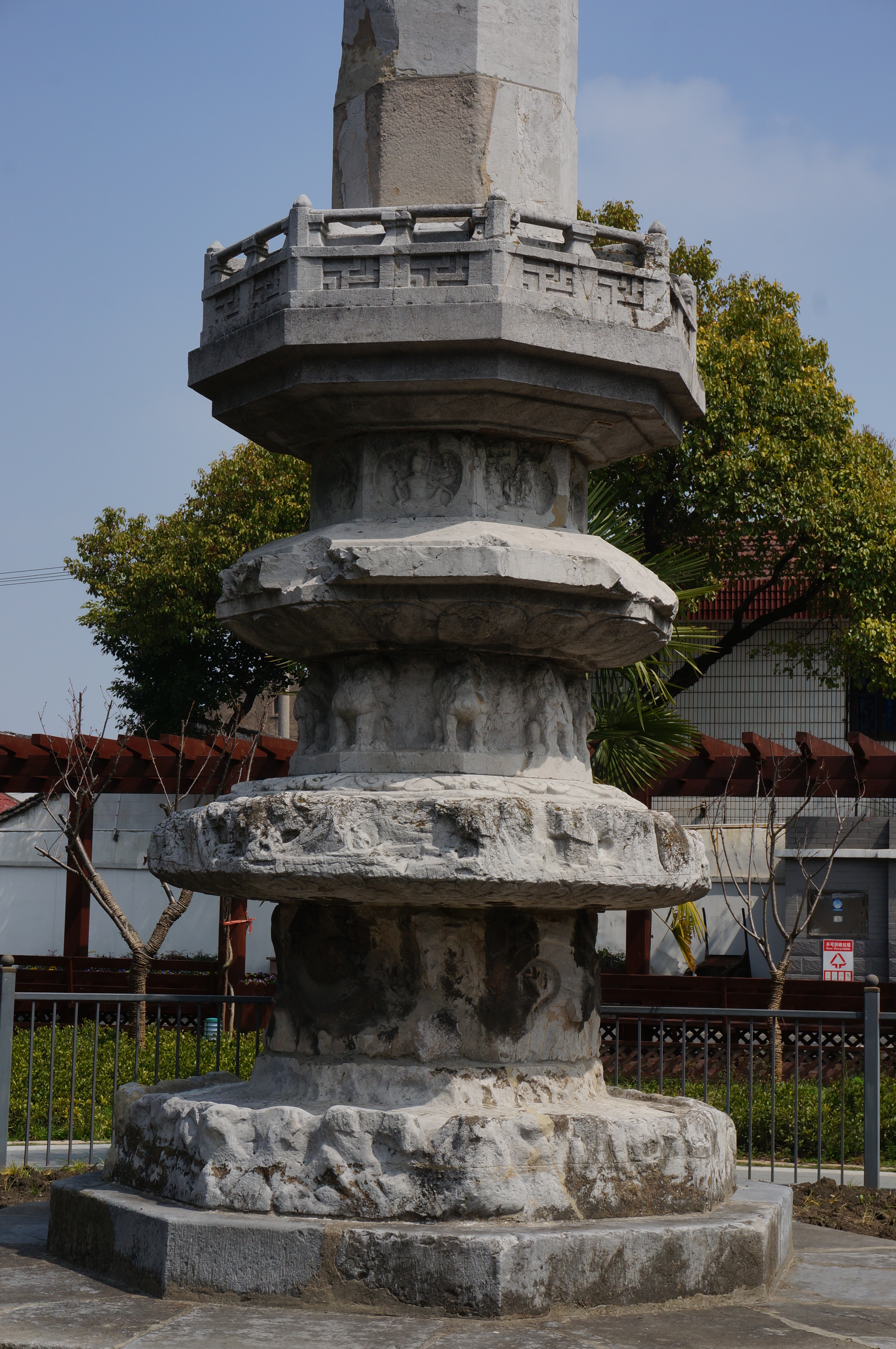
Close up of the southwest side of the sutra banner from the bottom up

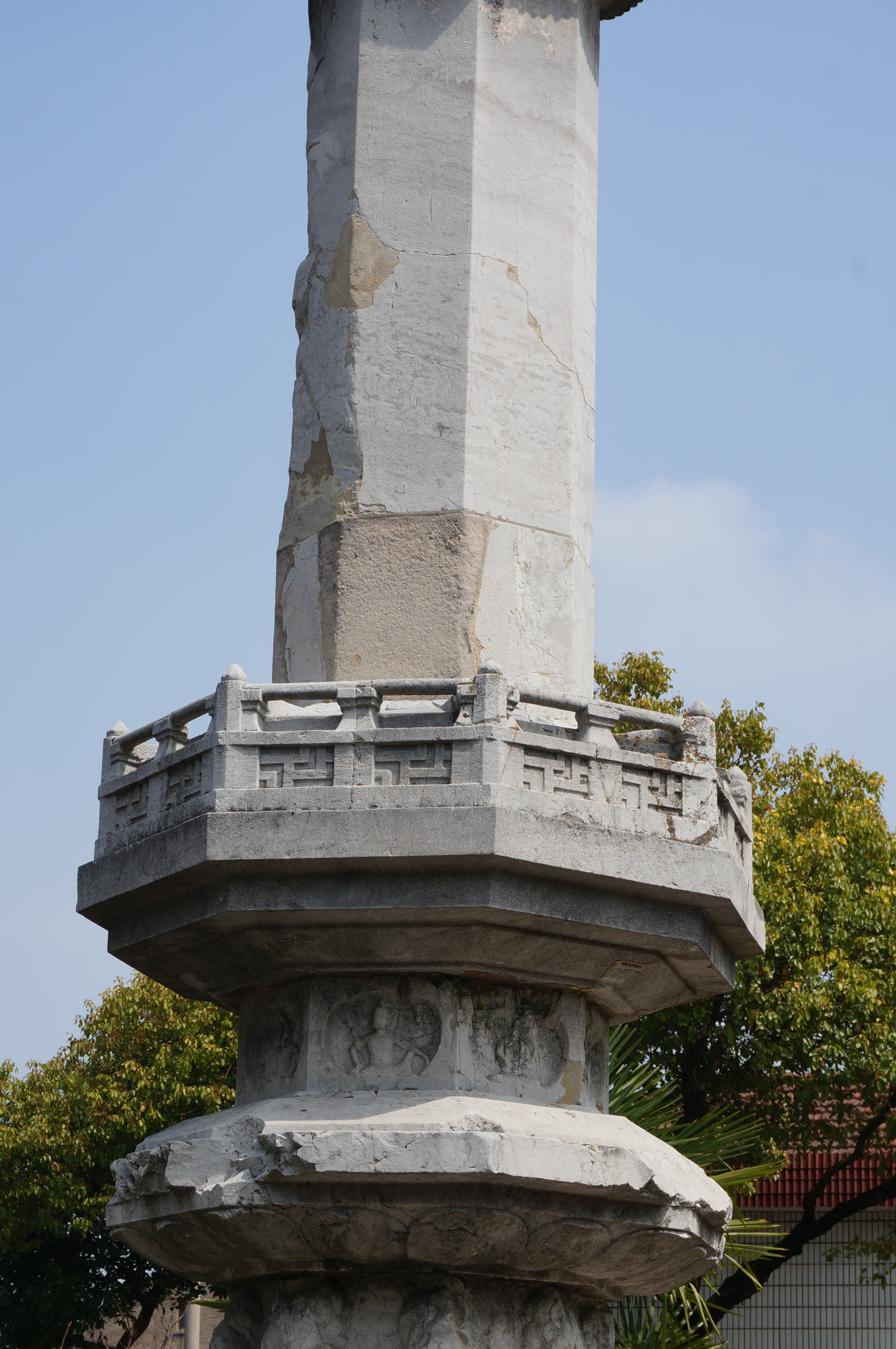
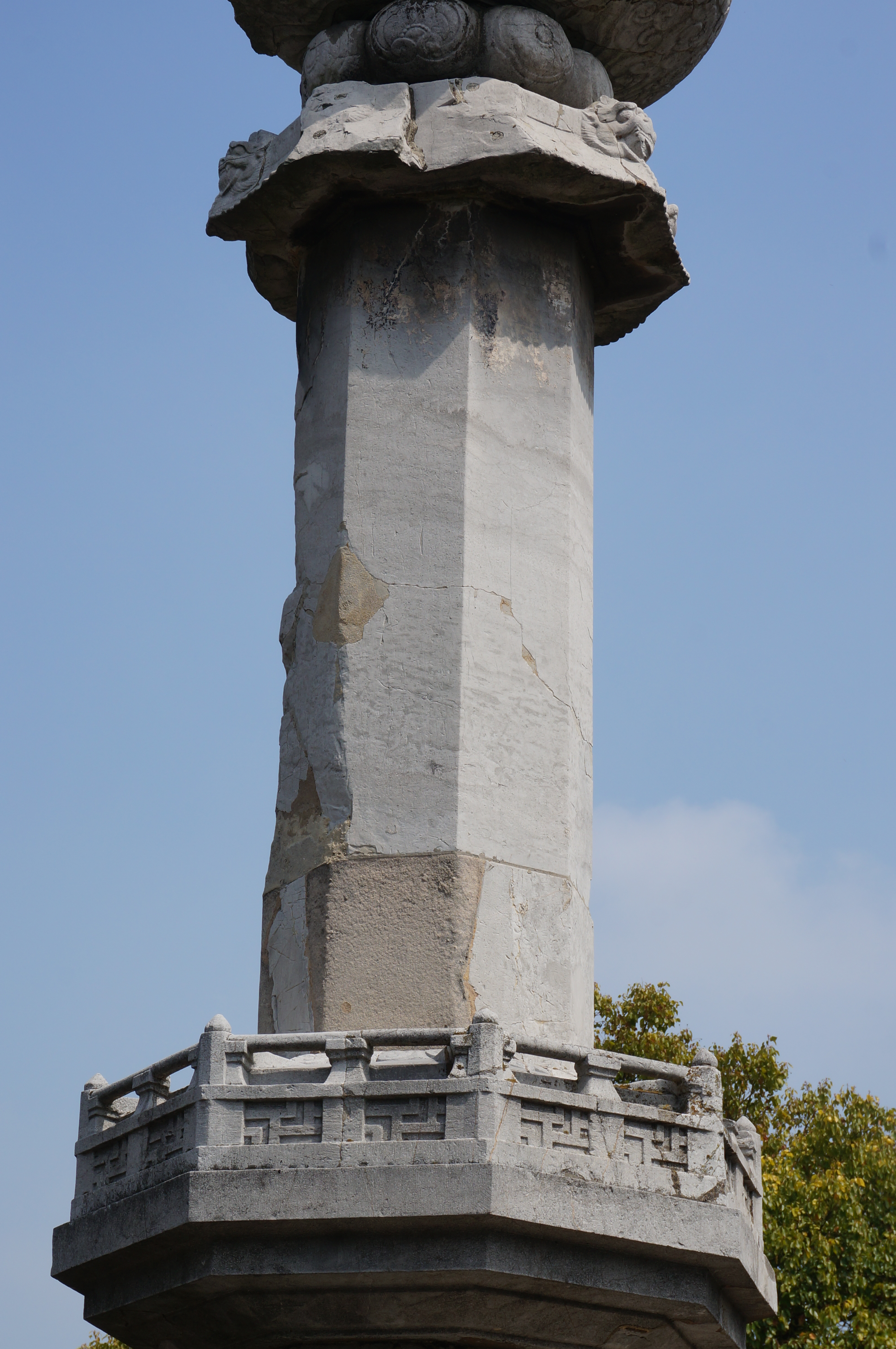
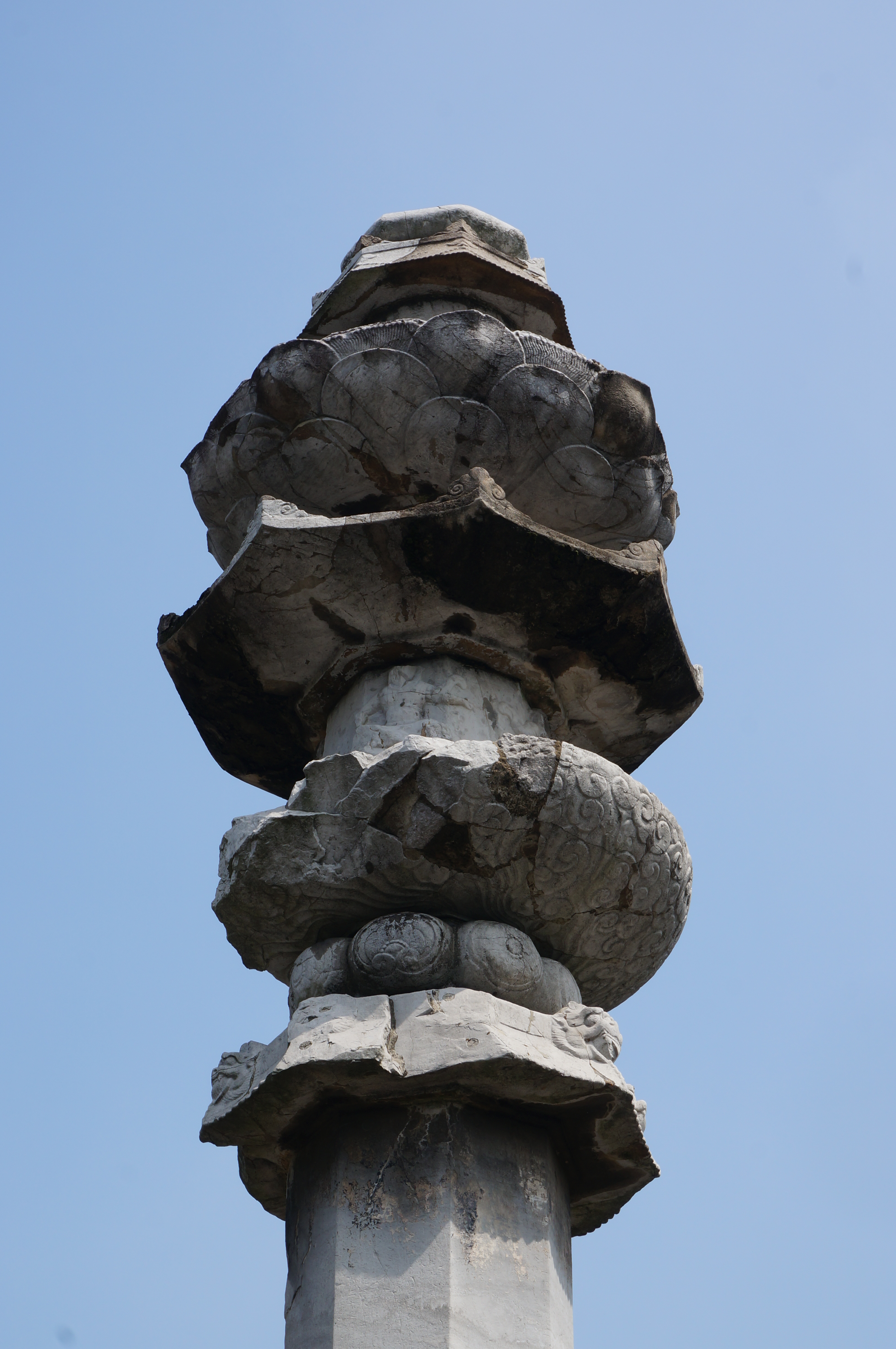

== Related Maintenance ==
In 1962, the Shanghai Municipal Government selected personnel to carry out maintenance work on the Songjiang Tang Sutra Building. The heritage department staff first cleared the 100 square meters around the scripture building and the 3-meter-deep soil layer, the mound was found to have a 10-stage block body with the base, and there was a brick paving the block in the Tang dynasty style. Afterwards, the maintenance staff surrounded the base with stones and built a wall about 3 meters high, outside of which stones and clay were piled into a mound.

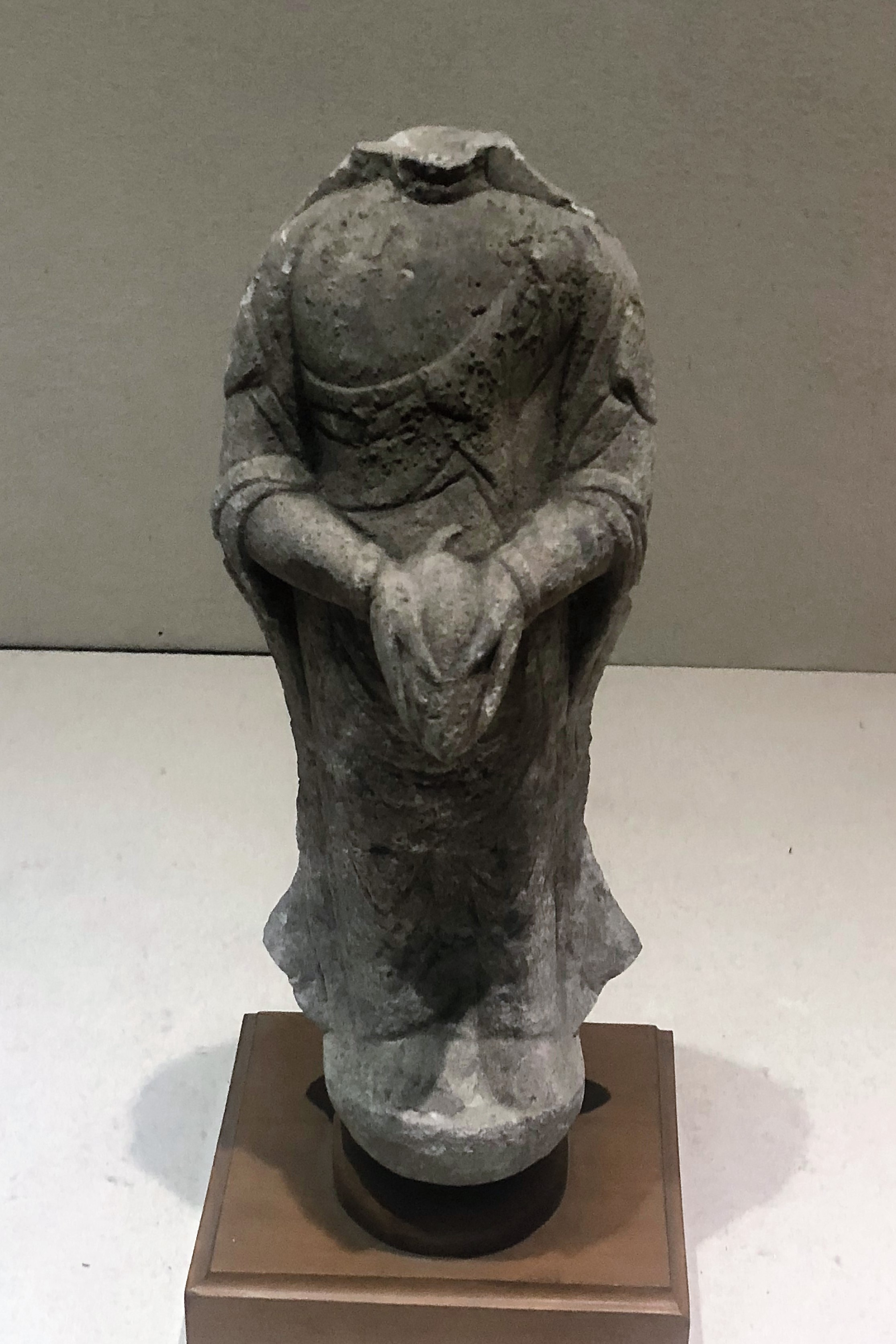
The statue found during the restoration of the sutra building in 1962 is presumed to be a component of the original sutra building

The restoration project was undertaken by the Shanghai Museum Restoration and Reproduction Workshop. In May 1963, the workshop on the warp block upper smaller carved parts for trial gluing, after many trials practice success. In August of the same year, all 21 levels of stone elements were reinforced and glued together. In September, the restoration and installation of each part of the scripture building began. To ensure horizontal splicing, the staff filled the gaps between each level with ancient money-like copper plates. In October, the surface of the warp block was sprayed with silicone rubber after the restoration, installation, and construction were completed to prevent the block from absorbing water and delay the weathering of the surface of the warp block. The restoration of the scripture block was completed in November 1964. (Note: This time, part of the restoration project was studied as a project subject of "Polyacrylate-Epoxy Resin Bonding Application Technology for Fractured Rock Sculptures" in the "Science and Technology Development Plan from 1963 to 1972".)
