= Plug and feather =

Set of tools for splitting stone

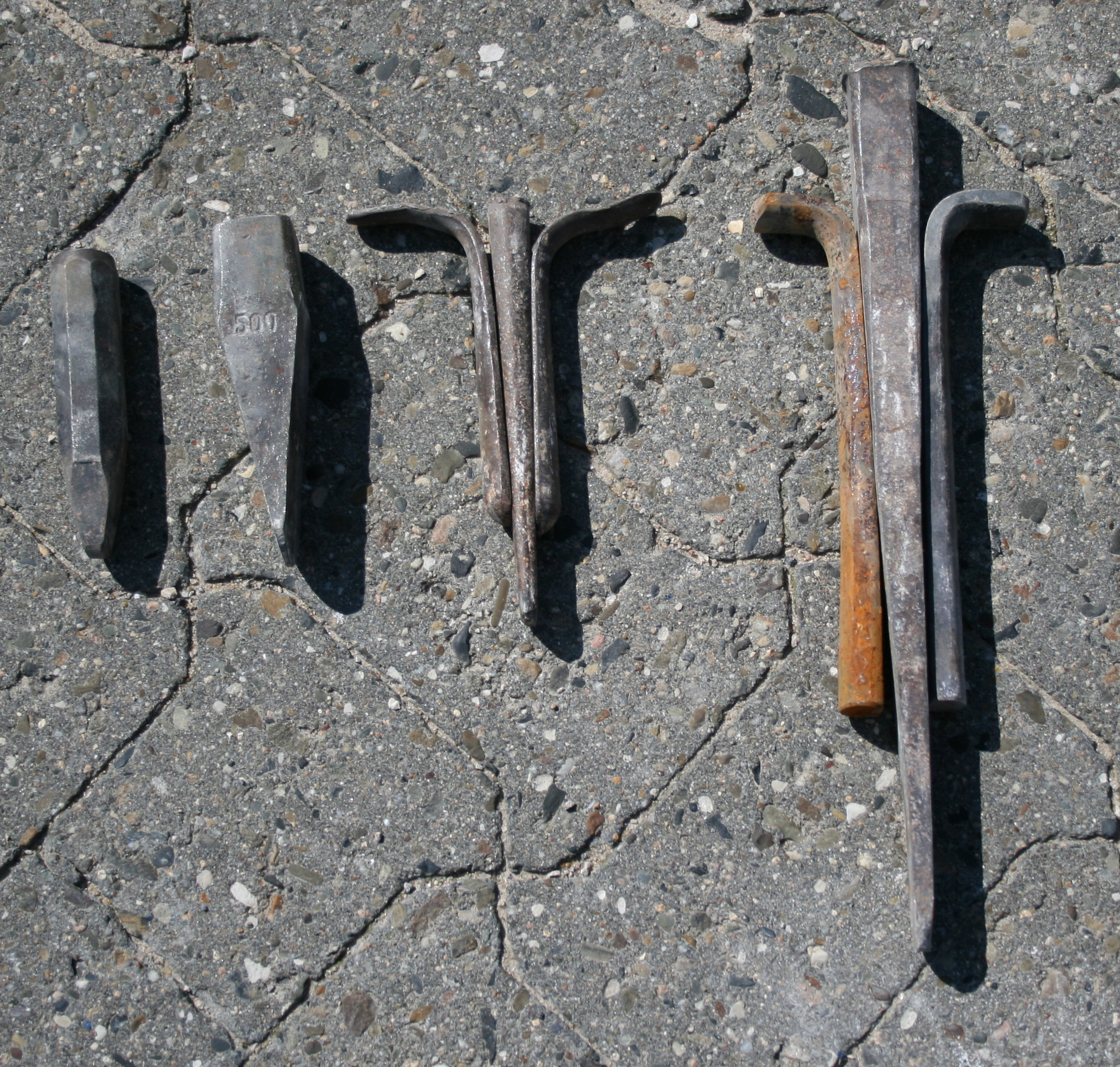
- Various examples of plug and feathers
- Other names: Feathers and wedges Wedges and shims Plugs and wedges

Plug and feather, also known as plugs and wedges, feather and wedges, wedges and shims, pins and feathers and feather and tare, is a technique and a three-piece tool set used to split stone.

== Description ==
The working principle of the plug and feathers

Each set consists of a metal wedge (the plug), and two metal shims (the feathers). The feathers are wide at the bottom, and tapered and curved at the top. When the two feathers are placed on either side of the plug, the combined width of the set is the same at both ends.

== Technique ==
A stone being split using a single plug and feathers

Multiple sets of plug and feathers are typically used to split a single, large piece of stone. The stone is first examined to determine the direction of the grain and to identify any potential defects. After the location of the intended split is chosen, a line is scored on the surface of the stone. A number of holes are then cut or drilled into the stone face along the scored line approximately 10 to 20 centimetres (3.9 to 7.9 in) apart. Plug and feather sets are inserted in the holes, with the "ears" of the feathers facing the direction of the desired split.

The plugs are then struck with a hammer in sequence. An audible tone from the wedges changes to a 'ringing sound' when the wedges are tight. Between each series of strikes, a pause of several minutes allows the stone to react to the pressure. Eventually a crack appears along the line that was scored on the surface and the stone splits apart.

Attempting to split the stone too quickly may cause the stone to "blow out" at the site of the plug or split at an undesirable section. While the stone might be recoverable, it requires additional work.

== History ==
Variations of the plug and feather method have been used since ancient Egyptian times. With this simple mechanical technique, the stone was first measured and marked. Bronze plugs and feathers were then driven into grooves which had been previously cut with a chisel and mallet. This was the most common method used by the Egyptians for quarrying limestone and sandstone. Evidence of this method for cutting obelisks in the quarries of Aswan can clearly be seen. The technique was also used by the Romans.

On Dartmoor, Devon, England, the process is known as feather and tare and it was used from around 1800 to split the large blocks of granite found on the ground there. It was, for instance, used to make the rails for the Haytor Granite Tramway in 1820.

In New England, the plug and feather technique is first mentioned in The New-England Farmer; Or, Georgical Dictionary (1790) by Samuel Deane. Deane wrote: "... another method of breaking rocks, which ought to be generally known, and which sometimes turns out cheaper, is this: Drill two holes in a stone, ranging with the grain, when that can be discovered with the eye. Then filling each hole with two semi-cylindrical pieces of iron, drive a long steel wedge between them. the stone will thus be split open. And commonly, very regular shaped pieces for building may be obtained."

In 1803, Lieutenant Governor Robbins of Massachusetts was a member of a committee that had been tasked with building a new state prison. In a chance encounter during the same year, Robbins came into contact with Mr. Tarbox, who was using a modified version of the plug and feather method that had been described by Deane. Instead of using only two holes, Tarbox drilled as many holes as were necessary, spacing them six to eight inches (15–20 cm) apart. Robbins hired Tarbox to teach his technique to the quarrymen at the quarries in Quincy, Massachusetts. Within a year, the price of quarried stone was cut in half. The method spread quickly and became the basis of the modern plug and feather method still used today.

Circa 1803, according to William Pattee's History of Old Braintree and Quincy (1878) Josiah Bemis, George Stearns, and Michael Wild developed a splitting method similar in concept to the plug and feather method. This technique for splitting stone (referred to by modern researchers as the "Flat Wedge Method") entailed cutting slots in a shallow line into the stone using a cape chisel struck with a large hammer. Small, flat metal wedges were then driven between shims made of sheet iron. The method of feathers and plugs began to be employed around this time, and spread rapidly throughout the region. Evidence of stone split with both methods indicate the evolution of this technique. The method using the cape chisel created long rectangular slots, whereas the newer method, using a plug drill, left round holes.

The plug and feather method is still widely in use today.

== Gallery ==
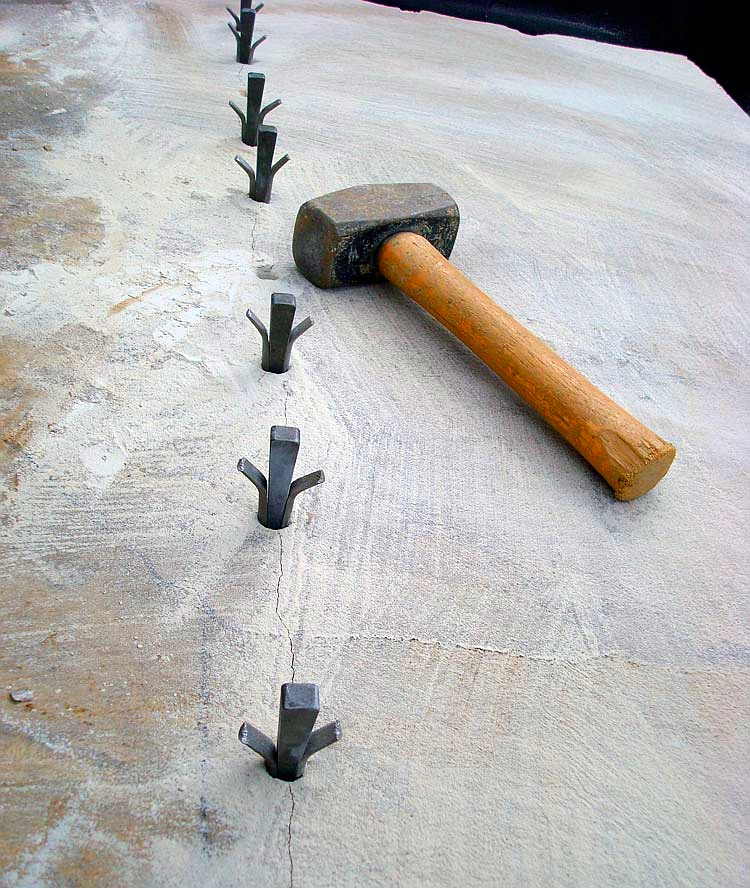
Plug and feathers with stone showing fracture line

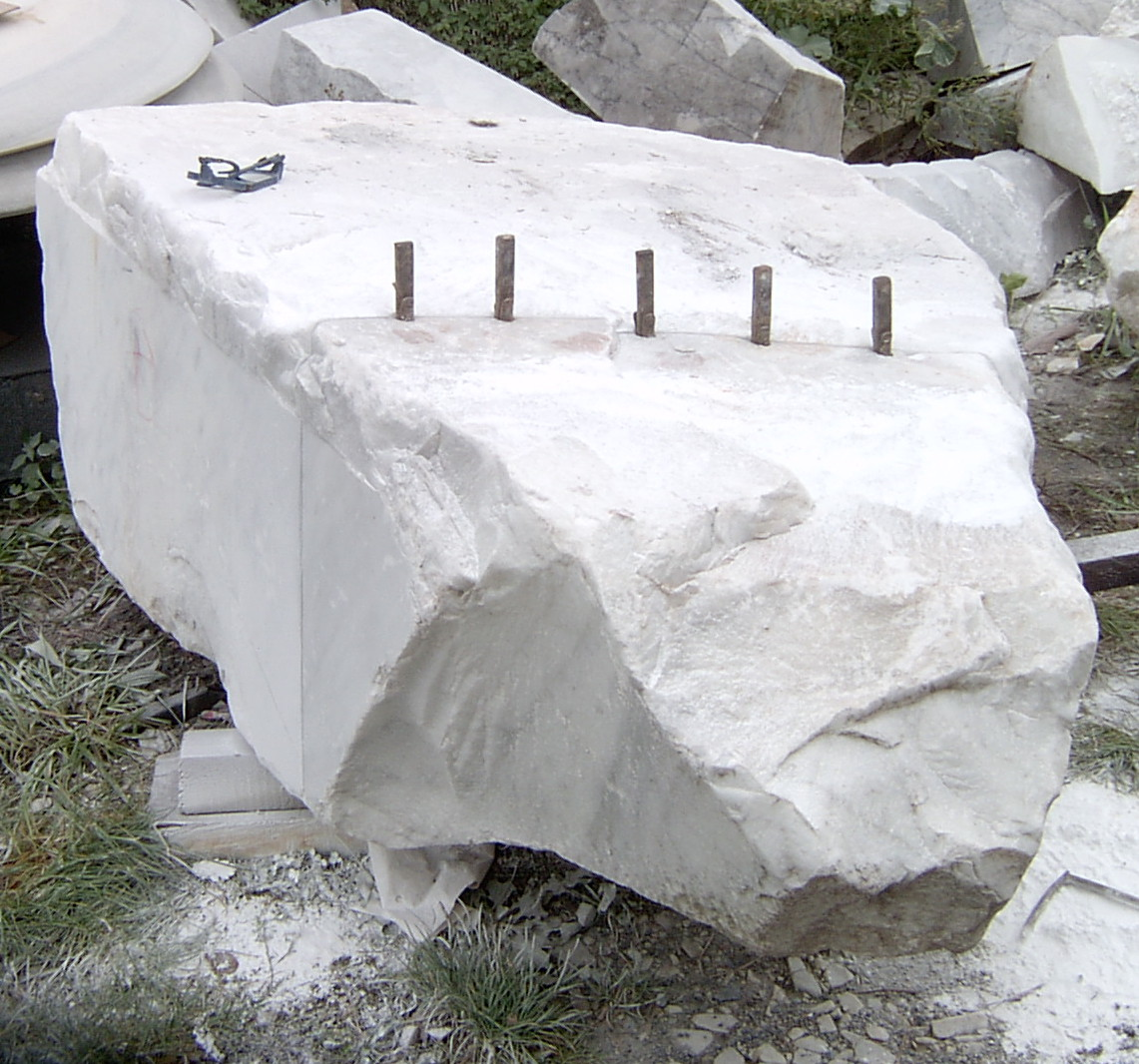
Five sets of plug and feathers in their respective holes

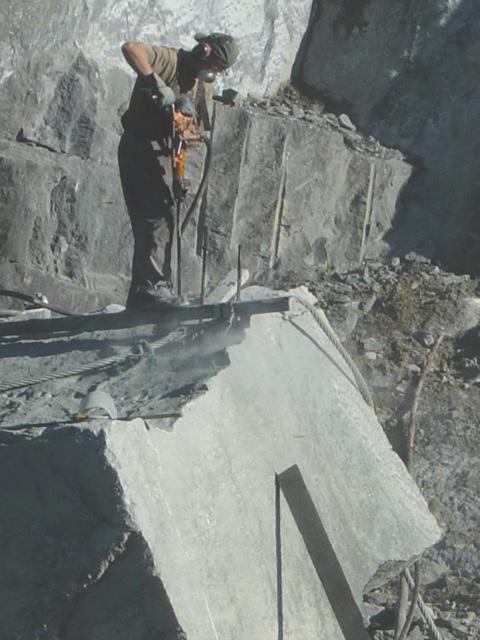
Pneumatic drilling as a preparation for splitting gabbro in a Norwegian quarry

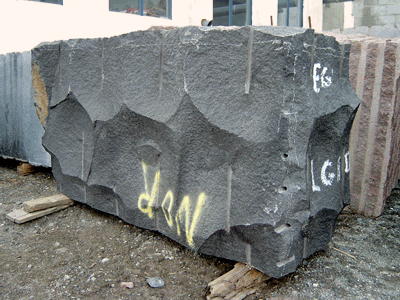
Tell-tale signs of splitting techniques used on a block of black granite

== See also ==
- Masonry – Building of structures from individual units of stone, bricks, or blocks
- Non-explosive demolition agents – Chemical mixtures that expand on setting in drilled holes to split rock, another way of splitting stone
- Stonemasonry – Creation of buildings, structures, and sculpture using stone
