= Thomas (surname) =

Origin
- Meaning: "son of Thomas"
- Region of origin: Great Britain, France, Germany, and Netherlands

Thomas is a common surname of English, Welsh, Irish, Scottish, French, German, Dutch, and Danish origin.

It derives from the medieval personal name, of Biblical origin, from Hebrew תאומא t'om'a, a byname meaning 'twin'. It was borne by one of the disciples of Christ, best known for his skepticism about Christ's resurrection (John 20, John 20:24–29). The th- spelling in English results from the initial letter of the name in the Greek New Testament being a theta. The English pronunciation as t rather than a dental fricative is the result of French influence from an early date. In Britain, the surname is widely distributed throughout the country, but especially common in Cornwall and Wales. Thomas is the ninth most common surname in the United Kingdom. It is found as a personal name among Christians in India, it is also used as a family name among the Saint Thomas Christian families from Kerala, South India.

In the 1990 United States Census, Thomas was the twelfth most common surname, accounting for 0.3% of the population.

In France, Thomas (pronounced [tɔmɑ]) is the third most widespread surname after Martin and Bernard, with over 100,000 people with this name.

== People ==
=== A ===
- Aaron Thomas (disambiguation), multiple people
- Abraham Thomas (surgeon) (born 1950), Indian reconstructive surgeon
- Adalius Thomas (born 1977), American football player
- Adam Thomas (disambiguation), multiple people
- Ade Renner Thomas, former Chief Justice of Sierra Leone
- Adonis Thomas (born 1993), American basketball player
- Adrian Thomas (composer) (born 19??), British? music academic
- Adrian P. Thomas (born c. 1982), American convicted and then acquitted of infanticide
- Adrienne Thomas (novelist), pseudonym of Hertha Deutsch (1897–1980), a German novelist
- Adrienne Thomas (archivist) (born 19??), acting Archivist of the United States
- Ahmad Thomas (born 1994), American football player
- Aidan Thomas (born 19??), English footballer
- Aiden Thomas (born 19??), Latin-American writer
- A. J. Thomas (disambiguation), multiple people
- Aeronwy Thomas (1943–2009), English translator
- Akeem Thomas (born 1990), Antiguan international footballer
- Aki Thomas (born 1979), American basketball coach
- Akil Thomas (born 2000), Canadian-American ice hockey player
- Alan Thomas (disambiguation), multiple people
- Albert and Albie Thomas (disambiguation), multiple people
- Albie Thomas (1935–2013), Australian middle- and long-distance runner
- Alec Thomas (c. 1894 – 19??), Native American linguist, anthropologist, and politician
- Aled Thomas (born 1985), Welsh rugby union footballer
- Alek Thomas (born 2000), American baseball player
- Alex Thomas (born 1978), English rock drummer
- Alexandrios Thomas (born 1971), Indian priest
- Alfonso Thomas (born 1977), South African cricketer
- Alfred Thomas (disambiguation), multiple people
- Algernon Thomas (1857–1937), New Zealand academic
- Allan Thomas (born 1990), Lebanese-South African football goalkeeper
- Allen Thomas (1830–1907), Confederate States Army brigadier general
- Alma Thomas (1891–1978), American expressionist painter
- Alun Thomas (1926–1991), Welsh international rugby union footballer
- Alys Thomas (born 1990), British swimmer
- Alyssa Thomas (born 1992), American basketball player
- Amare Thomas (born 2005), American football player
- Amber Thomas (born 1993), Canadian Paralympic swimmer
- Ambroise Thomas (1811–1896), French opera composer
- Ambry Thomas (born 1999), American football player
- Aminta Thomas (born 1990), Australian handball player
- Amos Thomas (Nebraska politician) (1882–1962), American politician and brigadier general from Nebraska
- Amos Thomas (Wisconsin politician) (1826–?), American politician from Wisconsin
- Anatole Thomas (born 1970), English cricketer
- André Thomas (cinematographer) (1911–1956), French cinematographer
- André J. Thomas (born 1952), American composer
- Andre Thomas, American man on death row for murdering his estranged wife and two children
- Andrea Thomas (German athlete) (born 1963), German Olympic sprinter
- Andrea Thomas (Jamaican athlete) (born 1968), Jamaican Olympic sprinter and middle-distance runner
- Andrés Thomas (born 1963), Dominican baseball player
- Andrew and Andy Thomas (disambiguation), multiple people
- Andy Thomas (born 1951), Australian-American astronaut
- Angie Thomas (born 1988), American young adult author
- Anna Thomas (born 1948), German-born American film screenwriter and film producer
- Annette Thomas (born 1965), American-born publishing executive
- Annick Le Thomas (1936–2024), French botanist
- Anthony Thomas (disambiguation), multiple people
- Antoine Thomas (1644–1709), Belgian Jesuit priest and missionary
- Antoine Jean-Baptiste Thomas (1791–1834), French painter and lithographer
- Antoine-Léonard Thomas (1732–1785), French poet and literary critic
- Antoine Thomas (linguist) (1857–1935), French linguist
- Antonia Thomas (born 1986), English actress
- Antonio Thomas, ring name of Tom Matera (born 1980), American wrestler
- Antony Thomas (born 1940), English filmmaker
- Anup Mathew Thomas (born 1977), Indian visual artist
- Arthur Thomas (disambiguation), multiple people
- Arsema Thomas (born 1994), American actress
- Artie Thomas (1884–1960), Australian rules footballer
- Arwel Thomas (born 1974), Welsh rugby union international
- Ashley Thomas (born 1985), English musician and actor aka Bashy
- Aswad Thomas (born 1989), English footballer
- Athir Thomas (born 1987), South Sudanese international footballer
- Audra Thomas, Northern Irish TV presenter
- Audrey Thomas (born 1935), Canadian novelist and short story writer
- Augusta Read Thomas (born 1964), American composer
- Augustus Thomas (1857–1934), American playwright
- Aurealius Thomas (1934–2021), American football player
- Austin Thomas (1939–2018), Aruban Olympic fencer
- Azareye'h Thomas (born 2004), American football player

=== B ===
- Banner Thomas (c. 1954–2017), American bassist
- Barrie Thomas (born 1937), English footballer
- Barry Thomas (artist), New Zealand artist and film maker
- Barry Thomas (cricketer) (born 1956), New Zealand cricketer
- Barry Thomas (decathlete) (born 1972), British athlete
- Barry Thomas (rugby union) (1937–2018), New Zealand rugby player
- Barry Thomas (sound engineer) (1932–2017), American film sound engineer
- Barry Thomas (speedway rider) (born 1951), British speedway rider
- Ben and Benjamin Thomas (disambiguation), multiple people
- Bep Thomas (born 1938), Dutch football referee
- Bernard Thomas (born 1945), Welsh Anglican Archdeacon
- Bert Thomas (1883–1966), British cartoonist
- Bertha Thomas (1845–1918), English author
- Bess Thomas (1892–1968), Australian librarian
- Betsy Thomas, American television writer
- Betty Thomas (born 1948), American actress and director
- Bill and Billie Thomas (disambiguation), multiple people
- B. J. Thomas (1942–2021), American pop singer
- Blair Thomas (born 1967), American football player and coach
- Bob, Bobbie and Bobby Thomas (disambiguation), multiple people
- Bode Thomas (1918–1953), Nigerian politician
- Borger Thomas (born 1995), Norwegian footballer
- Brad and Bradley Thomas (disambiguation), multiple people
- Brandon Thomas (disambiguation), multiple people
- Brayden Thomas (born 1998), American football player
- Brett Thomas (born 1959), American spree killer and rapist
- Brian Thomas (disambiguation), multiple people
- Brianna Thomas, musical artist
- Broderick Thomas (born 1967), American football player
- Bronwen Thomas (born 1969), Canadian freestyle skier
- Bruce Thomas (musician) (born 1948), English rock bassist
- Bruce Thomas (actor) (born 1961), American actor
- Bruce Thomas (cricketer) (born 1942), Australian cricketer
- Bryan Thomas (American football) (born 1979), American football player
- Bryan Thomas (architect) (1928–2024), British architect
- Bryan Thomas (canoeist) (born 1961), Australian canoeist
- Bryan M. Thomas (1836–1905), American general
- Bubba Thomas (born 2000), American football player
- Bud Thomas (pitcher) (1910–2001), American baseball pitcher
- Bud Thomas (shortstop) (1929–2015), American baseball shortstop
- Burke Thomas, American musician and record producer
- Buzz Thomas (born 1969), American politician in Michigan
- B. W. R. Thomas (born 1940s), Sri Lankan cricketer

=== C ===
- Caitlin Thomas (1913–1994), author wife of Dylan Thomas
- Calvin Thomas (disambiguation), multiple people
- Cam Thomas (born 2001), American basketball player
- Cam Thomas (cornerback) (born 1991), American football player
- Cam Thomas (defensive tackle) (born 1986), American football player
- Cameron Thomas (defensive end) (born 2000), American football player
- Cameron Thomas (politician) (born 1982), British politician
- Carl Thomas (disambiguation), multiple people
- Carla Thomas (born 1942), American singer
- Carla Thomas (basketball), American basketball player
- Carlos Thomas (born 1987), American Canadian football defensive back
- Carmen Thomas (born 1946), German journalist, radio and television presenter, author and lecturer
- Caroline Thomas (1959–2008), British international relations academic
- Carrie Thomas Alexander-Bahrenberg (1861–1929), American businesswoman and activist
- Caryl Thomas (born 1986), Welsh rugby union player
- Casey Thomas (born 1990), Welsh footballer
- Catalina Thomas (1531–1574), Spanish religious
- Catherine Thomas (born 1963), Welsh politician
- Catrin Thomas (born 1964), British ski mountaineer and mountain climber
- Cave Thomas, English painter
- Cecil Thomas (disambiguation), multiple people
- Ceiron Thomas (born 1983), Welsh rugby union footballer
- Celia Thomas, Baroness Thomas of Winchester (born 1945), British politician
- Ceri Thomas British journalist and media executive
- C. F. Thomas Chennikkara Francis Thomas (1939–2020), Indian politician
- Chad Thomas (born 1995), American football player
- Chan Thomas, American ufologist and writer
- Chance Thomas (born 1960s), American composer
- Chantal Thomas (born 1945), French writer and historian
- Chantal J.M. Thomas, American law professor
- Charlene Thomas (born 1982), English middle-distance runner
- Charles Thomas (disambiguation), multiple people
- Chase Thomas (born 1989), American football player
- Chelsea Thomas (born 1990), American softball player
- Chloe Thomas (born 19??), British TV and film director
- Chris and Christopher Thomas (disambiguation), multiple people
- Christi Thomas (born 1982), American basketball player
- Christian Thomas (disambiguation), multiple people
- Chuck Thomas (American football) (born 1960), professional American football player
- Claire Thomas (born 1986), American food enthusiast and blogger
- Clara Thomas (academic), Canadian academic
- Clara Thomas (politician), American politician
- Clarence Thomas (born 1948), United States Supreme Court justice
- Claude Thomas (disambiguation), multiple people
- Clem Thomas (1929–1996), Welsh rugby union international
- Clendon Thomas (1935–2026), American football player
- Clete Thomas (born 1983), American baseball player
- Clevan Thomas (born 1979), American football player
- Clint Thomas (1896–1990), American baseball player
- Clive Thomas (disambiguation)
- Cody Thomas (born 1994), American baseball player
- Colette Thomas (1929–2001), French Olympic swimmer
- Connor Thomas (born 1998), American baseball player
- Conor Thomas (born 1993), English footballer
- Corey Thomas (American football) (born 1975), American football player
- Cori Thomas, American playwright
- Courtney Thomas (born 1988), American beauty pageant titleholder
- Craig Thomas (disambiguation), multiple people
- Curtis Thomas (born 1948), American politician in Pennsylvania
- Cyriac Thomas (born 1943), Indian academic
- Cyril Thomas (boxer) (born 1976), French boxer

=== D ===
- Dafydd Elis-Thomas (1946–2025), Welsh politician
- Dai Thomas (rugby league) (1879–1958), rugby league footballer who played in the 1900s for Other Nationalities, and Oldham
- Dai Thomas (rugby union) (1909–??), Welsh international rugby union footballer
- Dai Thomas (footballer, born 1975), Welsh footballer
- Dale O. Thomas (1923–2004), American wrestler and wrestling coach
- Dale Thomas (footballer) (born 1987), Australian rules footballer
- Dallas Thomas (born 1989), American football player
- Damar Thomas (born 2004), English boxer
- Damien Thomas (1942–2025), British actor
- Damon Thomas (American football) (born 1970), American football player
- Damon Thomas (politician) (born 1949), Australian public official
- Damon Thomas (record producer), American record producer, half of The Underdogs duo
- Dan and Daniel Thomas (disambiguation), multiple people
- Dana Thomas (born 1964), American fashion journalist
- Daniel, Daniela, Dann and Danny Thomas (disambiguation), multiple people
- Dante Thomas (born 1978) American R&B singer and musician
- Darren Thomas (born 1975), Welsh footballer
- Darron Thomas (born 1990), American former football quarterback
- Daryl Thomas (1965–2018), American basketball player and coach
- Da'shawn Thomas (born 1987), US Canadian football player
- Dave and David Thomas (disambiguation) multiple people
- Davyd Thomas (born 1956), Deputy Chief of Navy, Royal Australian Navy
- Dean Thomas (footballer) (born 1961), former manager of Hinckley United
- Dean Thomas (motorcyclist) (born 1973), motorcycle racer from Australia
- Dean Thomas (rugby league) (born 1966), an English rugby league coach and former player
- DeAndre Thomas (born 1986), American basketball player
- De'Anthony Thomas (born 1993), American football player
- Debi Thomas (born 1967), American Olympic figure skater
- Dee Thomas (born 1967), American football player
- Delano Thomas, American indoor volleyball player
- Delme Thomas (born 1942), Welsh rugby union international
- Demaryius Thomas (1987–2021), American football player
- Denise Thomas (born 1979), Irish footballer
- Dennis "Dee Tee" Thomas (1951–2021), founding member of the band Kool & the Gang
- Deon Thomas (born 1971), American-Israeli basketball player
- Derek Thomas (disambiguation), multiple people
- Derrel Thomas (born 1951), American baseball player
- Derrick Thomas (agricultural scientist) (1944–2013), British agricultural scientist
- Derrick Thomas (1967–2000), US American football player
- Deshaun Thomas (born 1991), American basketball player
- Devin Thomas (born 1986), American football player
- Devon Thomas (born 1989), West Indian cricketer from Antigua
- Diane Thomas (1946–1985), American screenwriter
- Dick Thomas (disambiguation), multiple people
- Dillon Thomas (born 1992), American baseball player
- Din Thomas (born 1976), American mixed martial artist
- D. M. Thomas (1935–2023), British novelist, poet, playwright and translator
- Dom Thomas (born 1996), Scottish footballer
- Dominic Thomas (born 1995), English footballer
- Donald and Donnie Thomas (disambiguation), multiple people
- Dontarrious Thomas (born 1980), American football player
- Dorival Thomas (born 1976), Brazilian footballer
- Dorothy Thomas (disambiguation), multiple people
- Doug Thomas (basketball) (born 1983), American basketball player
- Douglas Thomas (academic) (born 1966), American scholar, researcher and journalist
- Douglas Thomas (Maine politician) (born 1969), American politician in Maine
- DQ Thomas (born 1998), American football player
- Drake Thomas (born 2000), American football player
- Duane Thomas (1947–2024), American football running back
- Duane Thomas (boxer) (1961–2000), American boxer
- Dwayne Thomas (born 1984), American Virgin Islands footballer
- Dwight Thomas (born 1980), Jamaican sprinter
- Dylan Thomas (1914–1953), Welsh poet
- Dywane Thomas, Jr. (born 1990), American bassist and experimental musician

=== E ===
- E. Donnall Thomas (1920–2012), American physician, developer of bone marrow transplant
- E. J. Thomas, American politician in Ohio
- E. Parry Thomas (1921–2016), American banker
- Earl Thomas (born 1989), American football player.
- Earl Thomas (basketball) (1915–1989), American professional basketball player
- Earl Thomas (musician) (born 1960), American blues and soul singer
- Earl Thomas (wide receiver) (1948–2020), professional American football player
- Earle Thomas, New Zealand international football (soccer) player
- Earlie Thomas (1945–2022), American football player
- Ebony Elizabeth Thomas, American writer and educator
- Ed and Eddie Thomas (disambiguation), multiple people
- Edgar Thomas (cricketer) (1875–1936), English cricketer
- Edgar Thomas (footballer) (1895–?), Welsh international footballer
- Edmund Thomas (Parliamentarian) (1633–1677), Welsh politician
- Edmund Thomas, New Zealand jurist
- Edward Thomas (disambiguation), multiple people
- Edwin Thomas (disambiguation), multiple people
- Elean Thomas (1947–2004), Jamaican poet, novelist, journalist and activist
- Elin Manahan Thomas (born 1977), Welsh soprano
- Elizabeth Thomas (disambiguation), multiple people
- Ella Thomas (born 1991), Eritrean-American model and actress
- Ellen Thomas (born 1947), American peace activist
- Ellen Thomas (born 1956), British actress
- Elliot Griffin Thomas (1926–2019), American Roman Catholic bishop
- Elmer Thomas (1876–1965), U.S. Senator from Oklahoma
- Elvis Thomas (soccer, born 1972), Canadian international soccer player
- Elvis Thomas (footballer, born 1994), Antiguan footballer
- Emily Thomas (gymnast) (born 2001), Welsh gymnast
- Emily Thomas (snowboarder) (born 1973), Australian snowboarder
- Emily Thomas (swimmer), New Zealand swimmer
- Emma Thomas British film producer
- Emmitt Thomas (born 1943), American football player and coach
- Emory Thomas (born 1939), American historian and academic
- Ena Thomas (1935–2020), Welsh television chef
- Ender Thomas, Venezuelan singer-songwriter
- Eric Thomas (disambiguation), multiple people
- Erich Thomas (1897–1960), German flying ace
- Ernest Ivy Thomas, Jr. (1924–1945), U.S. Marine
- Ernest Lee Thomas (born 1949), American actor
- Ernst-Marcus Thomas (born 1973), German TV host, radio dj and journalist
- Eustase Thomas-Salignac (1847–1943), French tenor
- Evan Thomas (disambiguation), multiple people
- Evelyn Thomas (1953–2024), American pop singer
- Évelyne Thomas (born 1964), French TV talk show host

=== F ===
- Faith Thomas (1933–2023), Australian cricket and field hockey player
- Fay Thomas (1903–1990), American baseball player
- Festus Thomas (born 1963), Namibian politician
- Forrest M. Thomas Jr. (1953–2013), American singer known as Forrest
- Francis Thomas (disambiguation), multiple people
- Frank and Frankie Thomas (disambiguation), multiple people
- Franklin Thomas (disambiguation), multiple people
- Frazier Thomas (1918–1985), American TV presenter and children's author
- Fred, Freddie, Frederic and Frederick Thomas (disambiguation), multiple people
- Freeman Thomas (born 1957), American automobile designer
- Frosty Thomas (1881–1970), American baseball player
- F.W.L. Thomas (c.1812–1885), Royal Navy officer, photographer, and historian

=== G ===
- G. Thomas, pseudonym of American music video director Paul Hunter (director)
- Gabriel Thomas (1824–1905), French sculptor
- Gabriel Thomas (aviator) (born 1896, date of death unknown), French World War I flying ace
- Gareth Thomas (disambiguation), multiple people
- Garth Thomas (1963–2025), American football player
- Garvin Thomas, American TV journalist
- Gary Thomas (disambiguation), multiple people
- Gavin Thomas (born 1977), Welsh rugby union international
- Gene Thomas (1937–2012), American pop singer, one half of the duo Gene & Debbe
- Geoff and Geoffrey Thomas (disambiguation), multiple people
- Georg Thomas (1890–1946) German general
- George Thomas (disambiguation), multiple people
- Geraint Thomas (born 1986), Welsh racing cyclist
- Gerald Thomas (disambiguation), multiple people
- Gerard Thomas (1663–1721), Flemish Baroque painter
- Gerrit Thomas (born 1973), German electronic musician
- Gerry Thomas (1922–2005), American salesman
- Gertrude Auld Thomas (1872–1959), American soprano and composer
- Glen Thomas (born 1967), English football player
- Glynne Thomas (1935–2021), British ice hockey player
- Gordon Thomas (disambiguation), multiple people
- Gorman Thomas (born 1950), American baseball player
- Grady Thomas (born 1941), American singer
- Graeme Thomas (born 1988), British rower
- Graham Stuart Thomas (1909–2003), English horticulturalist and garden designer
- Grahame Thomas (born 1938), Australian cricketer
- Grant Thomas (disambiguation), multiple people
- Greg Thomas (born 1960), Welsh cricketer who played for England
- Guy Thomas (born 1977), New Zealand equestrian
- Gwenda Thomas (born 1942), Welsh labour party politician
- Gwyn Thomas (disambiguation), multiple people

=== H ===
- Haile Thomas (born 2000), American motivational speaker
- Hank Willis Thomas (born 1976), American visual artist
- Harold Thomas (disambiguation), multiple people
- Harry Thomas (disambiguation), multiple people
- Harvey Thomas (disambiguation), multiple people
- Haydn Thomas (born 1982), English rugby union footballer
- Heather Thomas (born 1957), American actress, screenwriter, author and political activist
- Heck Thomas (1850–1912) Oklahoma lawman
- Héctor Thomas (1938–2008), Venezuelan Olympic decathlete
- Hedley Thomas, Australian investigative journalist and author
- Heidi Thomas (born 1962), English screenwriter and playwright
- Helen Thomas (disambiguation), multiple people
- Hendry Thomas (born 1985), Honduran footballer
- Henri and Henry Thomas (disambiguation), multiple people
- Hilah Thomas (1909–2009), American medical science writer
- Hiram Thomas (1889–1974), Canadian politician in Nova Scotia
- Hollis Thomas (born 1974), American football player and coach
- Holly A. Thomas, American judge
- Homer L. Thomas (1913–2003), American art historian and archaeologist
- Horace Thomas (1890–1916), Welsh rugby union international
- Howard Thomas (producer) (1909–1986), UK radio producer and TV executive
- Howard Thomas (scientist) (1948–2022), Welsh plant scientist
- Howard Thomas (wrestler) (1905–1995), Canadian wrestler
- Hubert Thomas (disambiguation), multiple people
- Hugh Thomas (disambiguation), multiple people
- Huw Thomas (1927–2009), Welsh broadcaster, barrister and Liberal politician

=== I ===
- Ian Thomas (disambiguation), multiple people
- Ibrahima Thomas (born 1987), Senegalese basketball player
- Iestyn Thomas (born 1976), Welsh rugby union international
- Ike Thomas (born 1947), American football cornerback
- Imogen Thomas (born 1982), Welsh model and TV personality
- Ira Thomas (1881–1958), American baseball player
- Irma Thomas (born 1941), American singer
- Irving Thomas (born 1966), American basketball player
- Irwin Thomas (born 1971), Australian singer-songwriter and guitarist
- Isaac Thomas (1784–1859), American congressman from Tennessee
- Isaiah and Isiah Thomas (disambiguation), multiple people
- Ivan Thomas (born 1991), British cricketer
- Ivan Thomas (lawyer) (1913–2000), New Zealand lawyer and NZR administrator
- Ivor Thomas (disambiguation), multiple people
- Iwan Thomas (born 1974), British (Welsh) Olympic athlete

=== J ===
- Jack Thomas (disambiguation), multiple people
- Jackie Thomas (singer) (born 1990), winner of the first series of The X Factor in New Zealand
- Jacob Thomas (VC) (1833–1911), British Victoria Cross recipient
- Jacob Thomas (soccer) (born 1977), American soccer player
- Jacqueline Thomas, victim in a high-profile English murder case from the 1960s
- Jade Thomas (born 1982), Welsh footballer
- Jah Thomas (born 1955), Jamaican dj and record producer
- Jai'Den Thomas (born 2005), American football player
- Jaimie Thomas (born 1986), American football player
- Jake Thomas (born 1990), American actor
- Jake Thomas (Canadian football) (born 1990), Canadian football defensive tackle
- Jakobe Thomas (born 2003), American football player
- Jamario Thomas (born 1985), American football player
- Jamel Thomas (born 1976), American basketball player
- James Thomas (disambiguation), multiple people
- Jamie Thomas (born 1974), American skateboarder
- Jamie Thomas (footballer, born 1985), Antiguan international footballer
- Jamie Thomas (footballer, born 1997), English-born Welsh footballer
- Jamie Thomas (soccer, born 1992), American soccer player
- Jamo Thomas, American funk and soul singer
- Jan Thomas (born 1958), American children's book author and illustrator
- Jane Thomas (disambiguation), multiple people
- J. Antonio Thomas (1912–1998), Canadian politician
- Jarret Thomas (born 1981), American Olympic snowboarder
- Jasmine Thomas (basketball) (born 1989), American basketball player
- Jason Thomas (Marine) (born 1974), US marine and September 11 rescuer
- Jason Thomas (footballer) (born 1997), Vanuatuan footballer
- Jay Thomas (1948–2017), American actor, comedian and radio talk-show host
- Jay Thomas (American football) (born 1960), American football coach
- Jayden Thomas (born 2002), American football player
- Jaylon Thomas (born 2000), American football player
- Jean Bell Thomas (1881–1982), American folk festival promoter
- Jean Thomas (biochemist) (born 1942), Welsh; Master of St Catharine's College, Cambridge
- Jean Thomas (novelist), pseudonym of American romantic novelist Robert "Bob" Rogers
- Jean-Charles Thomas (1929–2023), French Roman Catholic bishop
- Jean-Christophe Thomas (born 1964), French footballer
- Jean-Claude Thomas (1950–2018), French politician
- Jeff and Jeffrey Thomas (disambiguation)
- Jefferson Thomas (1942–2010), one American of the "Little Rock Nine"
- Jemea Thomas (born 1990), American football player
- Jennifer Thomas (born 1973), American fitness model and wrestler
- Jeremy Thomas (born 1949), British film producer
- Jermaine Thomas (born 1990), American football running back
- Jermaine Thomas (basketball) (born 1984), American basketball player
- Jérôme Thomas (born 1979), French boxer
- Jerome Thomas (born 1983), English footballer
- Jerry Thomas (disambiguation), multiple people
- Jess Thomas (1927–1993), American operatic tenor
- Jesse Thomas (disambiguation), multiple people
- Jessica Thomas (born 1984), Australian netball player
- Jessica Thomas (basketball) (born 1994), American basketball player
- Jessie Thomas, American educator
- Jewerl Thomas (born 1957), American football player
- Jim and Jimmy Thomas (disambiguation), multiple people
- Jithin Thomas (born 1990), Indian high jumper
- Joan Thomas, Canadian novelist and book reviewer
- Jobey Thomas (born 1980), American basketball player
- Jodi Thomas, pen name of American author Jodi Koumalats
- Joe Thomas (disambiguation), multiple people
- Joel Thomas (disambiguation), multiple people
- Joey Thomas (born 1980), American football player for the Miami Dolphins
- Johannes Thomas (born 1949), (East) German Olympic rower
- John and Johnny Thomas (disambiguation), multiple people
- Jomo Thomas (born 1974), American businessman, attorney and author
- Jon R. Thomas (1946–2017), US Assistant Secretary of State
- Jonathan Thomas (born 1982), Welsh rugby union international
- Jonathan Taylor Thomas (born 1981), American TV and movie actor
- Jordan Thomas (American football) (born 1996), American football player
- Jose Thomas, Indian film director
- Joseph Thomas (disambiguation), multiple people
- Josh Thomas (disambiguation), multiple people
- Josiah Thomas (disambiguation), multiple people
- Joy Thomas, Indian politician
- Joy A. Thomas (1963–2020) American Indian-born information theorist, science, and author
- Joyce Carol Thomas (1938–2016), American poet and playwright
- Joyyan Thomas (born 1998), Pakistani footballer
- J. Parnell Thomas (1895–1970), U.S. Congressman from New Jersey
- J. T. Thomas (disambiguation), multiple people
- Juanyeh Thomas (born 2000), American football player
- Jules Thomas (1886–1943), American baseball player
- Julia Thomas (died 1879), British woman murdered by her maid
- Julie Thomas (born 1967), Welsh lawn bowler
- Julie Thomas, first Chief Minister of Saint Helena
- Julian Thomas (journalist) (1843–1896), English-born Australian journalist and author
- Julian Thomas (born 1959), British archaeologist
- Julius Thomas (born 1988), American football player
- Justin Thomas (disambiguation), multiple people

=== K ===
- Kadell Thomas (born 1996), Canadian soccer player
- Karen P. Thomas (born 1957), American composer
- Karin Thomas (born 1961), Swiss Olympic cross country skier
- Karine Thomas (born 1989), Canadian Olympic synchronised swimmer
- Karl Thomas (disambiguation), multiple people
- Karolin Thomas (born 1985), German footballer
- Katherine Thomas (born 1966), English-born American musician known as The Great Kat
- Kathrin Thomas (1944–2023), Lord Lieutenant of Mid Glamorgan
- Kathryn Thomas (born 1979), Irish TV presenter
- Keith Thomas (disambiguation), multiple people
- Kelly Thomas (disambiguation), several people
- Ken, Keni, Kenn, Kenneth and Kenny Thomas (disambiguation), multiple people
- Keir Thomas (born 1998), American football player
- Kelon Thomas (born 2000), Canadian football player
- Keshia Thomas, an African-American photographed shielding a white man at a KKK rally
- Kevin Thomas (disambiguation), multiple people
- Keyeno Thomas (born 1977), Trinidadian international footballer
- Khyri Thomas (born 1996), American basketball player for Maccabi Tel Aviv of the Israeli Basketball Premier League and the EuroLeague
- Kim Thomas Smith, American politician
- Kiondre Thomas (born 1998), American football player
- Kit Thomas (born 1947), American film maker and record producer
- Kiwaukee Thomas (born 1977), US American and Canadian football player
- Kris Thomas (born 1984), American singer
- Kristen Thomas (born 1993), American rugby player
- Kristian Thomas (born 1989), British Olympic gymnast
- Kristin Scott Thomas (born 1960), English actress
- Krystal Thomas (born 1989), American basketball player
- Kurien Thomas (1922–2000), Indian missionary and Pentecostal theologian
- Kurt Thomas (disambiguation), multiple people
- K.V. Thomas (born 1946), Indian politician
- Kwame Thomas (born 1995), English footballer
- Kyle Thomas (born 1983), Canadian writer, director, producer, and actor

=== L ===
- Lamaar Thomas (born 1990), American football player
- Lamar Thomas (born 1970), American football player
- Lance Thomas (born 1988), American basketball player
- Lane Thomas (born 1995), American baseball player
- Lanny Thomas, American politician
- Larri Thomas (1932–2013), American actress and dancer
- Larry Thomas (disambiguation), multiple people
- Latasha Thomas (born 1965), American politician in Chicago
- LaToya Thomas (born 1981), American basketball player
- Laura Thomas, Welsh lawn and indoor bowler
- Laurence Thomas, American philosopher and academic
- Lavale Thomas (born 1963), American football player
- Lawrence S. Thomas, III, retired American brigadier general
- Lawrence Thomas (footballer) (born 1992), Australian footballer
- Lee Thomas (disambiguation), multiple people
- Leland Evan Thomas (1918–1942), United States Marine Corps pilot
- Len Thomas (1908–1943), Australian rules footballer
- Leo Thomas (1923–2001), American baseball player
- Leon Thomas (jazz singer) (1937–1999), American jazz singer
- Leon Thomas (born 1993), American actor, songwriter and singer
- Leron Thomas (born 1979), American jazz trumpeter, composer and vocalist
- LeSean Thomas (born 1975), American TV animation producer, director, animator, comic book artist and writer
- Les and Leslie Thomas (disambiguation), multiple people
- Lewis Thomas (disambiguation), multiple people
- Lillian Thomas (born 1949), Canadian politician in Winnipeg
- Lillo Thomas (born 1961), American athlete and soul musician
- Lily Thomas (1927–2019), Indian lawyer
- Lindsay Thomas (disambiguation), multiple people
- Liz Thomas (born 1987), American hiker
- L. Joseph Thomas (born 1942), American educator and administrator
- Llewellyn Thomas (1865–1924), English cricketer
- Llewellyn Thomas (1903–1992), British physicist and applied mathematician
- Logan Thomas (born 1991), American football player
- Lorenzo Thomas (1804–1875), American Army officer and temporary Secretary of War under Andrew Johnson
- Lorenzo Thomas (poet) (1944–2005), Panamanian-born American poet
- Lorna Thomas (1917–2014), Australian cricket player and manager
- Lot Thomas (1843–1905), American judge and congressman
- Louie Myfanwy Thomas (1908–68), Welsh writer
- Louis Thomas, Count of Soissons (1657–1702), Savoyard Prince and Imperial Austrian Army officer
- Louis Thomas (writer) (1885–1962), French writer
- Lowell Thomas (1892–1981), American writer, broadcaster, traveler, and businessman
- Lowell Thomas, Jr. (1923–2016), American film and television producer, Alaskan state senator
- Lucille Cole Thomas (1921–2019), American librarian
- Luke Thomas (born 1993), Welsh chef
- Lyda Ann Thomas, Mayor of Galveston, Texas
- Lynda Thomas (born 1981), Mexican musician and singer-songwriter
- Lynn Thomas (1959–2021), American football player
- Lynne Thomas (born 1939), Welsh cricketer (played for England)
- Lynne M. Thomas, American librarian

=== M ===
- M. E. Thomas, pseudonymous female law professor and sociopath
- M. Louise Thomas (1822–1907), American social reformer
- Mable Thomas (born 1957), American politician in Georgia
- Madison Thomas, Canadian film and television director
- Malcolm Thomas (disambiguation), multiple people
- Mandisa Thomas, American atheist activist
- Mansel Thomas (1909–1986), Welsh composer and conductor
- Marc Thomas (computer scientist) (1950–2017), American computer scientist and mathematician
- Marc Thomas (rugby union) (born 1990), Welsh rugby union footballer
- Marco Thomas (born 1983), American football player
- Marcus Thomas (disambiguation), multiple people
- Margaret Thomas (disambiguation), multiple people
- Maria Thomas (1941–1989), pen name of American writer Roberta Thomas
- Marie Thomas (1896–1966), Indonesian physician
- Marie-Bernadette Thomas (born 1955), French association football player
- Marjorie Thomas (1923–2008), English opera and oratorio singer
- Mark Thomas (disambiguation), multiple people
- Marlo Thomas (born 1937), American actress, daughter of Danny Thomas
- Martha Thomas (disambiguation), multiple people
- Martin Thomas (disambiguation), multiple people
- Martyn Thomas (born 1948), British software engineer
- Martyn Thomas (rugby union) (born 1987), Welsh rugby union player
- Marvell Thomas (1941–2017), American keyboard player
- Mary Thomas (disambiguation), multiple people
- Mathew, Matt and Matthew Thomas (disambiguation), multiple people
- Max Thomas (disambiguation), multiple people
- May Miles Thomas (born 1959), Scottish film director
- M. Carey Thomas (1857–1935), American suffragette and educator
- Meamea Thomas (1987–2013), I-Kiribati Olympic weightlifter
- Meleek Thomas (born 2006), American basketball player
- Mel Thomas (born 1985), American basketball player
- Melissa Thomas, Australian actress
- Melissa Thomas (dancer), ballet dancer
- Meredith Thomas (1892–1984), British Royal Air Force senior commander
- Michael Thomas (disambiguation), multiple people
- Michel Thomas (1914–2005), Polish-born French resistance fighter, linguist and American educator
- Michelle Thomas (c. 1968–1998), American actress
- Mick, Mickey, and Mike Thomas (disambiguation), multiple people
- Mickalene Thomas (born 1971), American artist
- Mikel Thomas (born 1987), Trinidad and Tobago sprinter
- Miles Thomas (1897–1980), British business executive
- Milt Thomas, American author and novelist
- Minnie Thomas Boyce (1870–1929), American writer
- Mitchell Thomas (born 1964), English footballer
- Mitchell Thomas Soldier Australian Army RAAC (Born 1997), Soldier
- Mitchell Thomas (curler) (born 1998), Australian curler
- Mohamed Sanni-Thomas (1927–2007), Ghanaian middle-distance runner
- Momo Thomas (born 1990), American football player
- Morgan Thomas (1824–1903), Welsh-Australian surgeon and public benefactor

=== N ===
- Naím Thomas (born 1980), Spanish singer and actor
- Natasha Thomas (born 1986), Danish pop singer-songwriter
- Nathan Thomas (disambiguation), multiple people
- Ned Thomas (rugby league), Welsh rugby league footballer who played in the 1910s, and 1920s
- Neil Thomas (Canadian football) (born c. 1940), Canadian football player
- Neil Thomas (gymnast) (born 1968), English Olympic gymnast
- Nelly Thomas, Australian comedian
- Nene Thomas (born 1968), American fantasy artist
- Nicholas, Nick, Nicky and Nico Thomas (disambiguation), multiple people
- Nikki Thomas, deputy director of 'Sex Professionals of Canada'
- Nils Thomas (1889–1979), Norwegian Olympic sailor
- Niveda Thomas (born 1995), Indian actress
- Noah Thomas (American football) (born 2004), American football player
- Noel Thomas Sir John Noel Thomas (1915–1983), British general in WWII
- Noel Thomas (curler) (born 1980), English wheelchair curler
- Noemie Thomas (born 1996), Canadian swimmer
- Nolan Thomas, American singer
- Norman Thomas (disambiguation), multiple people
- Norman Thomas (1884–1968), American socialist and six-time presidential candidate
- Norris Thomas (1954–2025), American football player
- Nutter Thomas (Arthur Nutter Thomas) (1869–1954), Anglican Bishop of Adelaide

=== O ===
- Oldfield Thomas (1858–1929), British zoologist
- Olive Thomas (1894–1920), American actress
- Olivia Thomas (disambiguation), multiple people
- Oliver Thomas (born 1957), American politician in New Orleans
- Olivier Thomas (born 1974), French footballer
- Omar Thomas (born 1982), American basketball player
- Oswald Thomas (1882–1963), German astronomer
- Owen Thomas (disambiguation), multiple people

=== P ===
- P. A. Thomas, Indian film director, producer, scriptwriter and actor
- Paca Thomas, American animator
- Pam Thomas, American TV producer, director and casting director
- Pascal Thomas (born 1945), French screenwriter and film director
- Pat and Patrick Thomas (disambiguation), multiple people
- Patty Thomas (dancer) (1922–2014)
- Paul Thomas (disambiguation), multiple people
- P.C. Thomas (born 1950), Indian politician
- P. D. G. Thomas (1930–2020), Welsh historian
- Peelipose Thomas, Indian politician
- Perry Thomas American football coach
- Pete and Peter Thomas (disambiguation), multiple people
- Petria Thomas (born 1975), Australian Olympic swimmer
- Phil, Philip, Philipa, Philippa and Phillip Thomas (disambiguation), multiple people
- Phoebe Thomas (born 1983), British actress
- Pierre Thomas (disambiguation), multiple people
- Pinklon Thomas (born 1958), American boxer
- Prince Varughese Thomas (born 1969), Indian-American artist
- Prins Thomas, Norwegian record producer and dj
- Priya Thomas, Canadian musician, dancer and choreographer
- P. T. Thomas (1950–2021) Indian politician

=== Q ===
- Quantavious Thomas (born 1992), American rapper professionally known as Young Nudy
- Quentin Thomas (born 1944), British civil servant

=== R ===
- Rachel Thomas (actress) (1905–1995), Welsh actress
- Rachel Thomas (skydiver), Indian skydiver
- Rachel Thomas (academic), American computer scientist
- Rackley Thomas (born 1980), Antigua and Barbudan international footballer
- Radha Thomas, Indian jazz musician
- Rajaji Mathew Thomas (born 1954), Indian politician
- Ralph Thomas (disambiguation), several people
- Ramblin' Thomas (c.1902–c.1945), American country blues singer, guitarist and songwriter
- Randal E. Thomas, American Army officer
- Randy Thomas (musician) (born 1954), American Christian musician
- Randy Thomas (American football) (born 1976), American football player
- Rasta Thomas (born 1981), American dancer, martial artist, gymnast and choreographer
- Ratcliff Thomas (born 1974), American football player
- Ráv Thomas, Australian singer-songwriter
- Ray Thomas (disambiguation), several people
- Raymond Thomas (disambiguation), several people
- Rebecca Thomas, American filmmaker
- Red Thomas (1898–1962), American baseball player
- Reg and Reggie Thomas (disambiguation). multiple people
- Regena Thomas, American politician
- Regina D. Thomas, American politician in Georgia
- Regis Deon Thomas (born 1970), American convicted murderer on death row in California
- Reji Thomas, American artist
- Rekha R. Thomas, American mathematician
- René Thomas (disambiguation), multiple people
- Reno Thomas (1922–2009), American politician in Pennsylvania
- Rhodri Glyn Thomas (born 1953), Welsh politician
- Rhylan Thomas (born 2000), American baseball player
- Rhys Thomas (disambiguation), multiple people
- Richard, Richie, Ricki, Ricky and Ritchie Thomas (disambiguation), several people
- R Mason Thomas (born 2004), American football player
- Robert, Rob, Bob, and Bobby Thomas, several people
- Robin Thomas (born 1949), American actor and sculptor
- Robin Thomas (mathematician) (1962–2020), American mathematician
- Roc Thomas (born 1995), American football player
- Rod Thomas (disambiguation)
  - Rod Thomas (1947–2025), Welsh international footballer
  - Rod Thomas (bishop) (born 1954), English bishop
  - Rodney Thomas (1973–2014), American football player
- Rodolphe Thomas (born 1962), French politician
- Roger Thomas (disambiguation), multiple people
- Rohn Thomas, American actor
- Romain Thomas (born 1988), French footballer
- Ron, Ronald, Ronni and Ronnie Thomas (disambiguation), multiple people
- R. Roosevelt Thomas Jr. (1944–2013), American diversity practitioner
- Rose Thomas (disambiguation), multiple people
- Rosemary Thomas (1901–1961), American poet and teacher
- Rosie Thomas (writer) (born 1947), British writer
- Rosie Thomas (singer-songwriter) (born c. 1978), American singer-songwriter
- Ross Thomas (author) (1926–1995), American writer of crime fiction
- Ross Thomas (actor) (born 1981), American actor
- Roy Thomas (disambiguation), multiple people
- Rozonda Thomas (born 1971), American R&B singer
- R. S. Thomas (1913–2000), Welsh poet and Anglican clergyman
- Rufus Thomas (1917–2001), American R&B singer
- Russ Thomas (1924–1991), American football player
- Russell Thomas, American operatic tenor
- Ruth Thomas (children's writer) (1927–2011), English author
- Ruth Thomas (novelist) (born 1967), British writer
- Ryan Thomas (disambiguation), multiple people

=== S ===
- Sally Thomas (born 1939), Australian judge
- Sally Thomas (powerlifter) (born 1970), Canadian para-powerlifter
- Sam Fan Thomas (born 1952), Cameroonian musician
- Sam Thomas (basketball) (born 1999), American basketball player
- Sam Thomas (campaigner) (born 1986), Writer/Campaigner/Activist
- Sam Thomas (jockey) (born 1984), Welsh jockey
- Samuel Thomas (priest) (1627–1693), English nonjuring clergyman and controversialist
- Samuel Bell Thomas (died 1943), New York lawyer
- Sandra Thomas (born 1986), Indian film producer and actress
- Santonio Thomas (born 1981), American football player
- Sara Thomas (born 1941), American politician in Mississippi
- Sarah Thomas (disambiguation), multiple people
- Scarlett Thomas (born 1972), English author
- Scott Thomas (disambiguation), multiple people
- Seán Thomas (died 1999), Irish football manager
- Sean Patrick Thomas (born 1970), American actor
- Semajay Thomas (born 1993), American boxer
- Shamarko Thomas (born 1991), American football player
- Shardé Thomas (born 1990), American fife player
- Shavar Thomas (born 1981), Jamaican footballer
- Sheleen Thomas, American singer
- Shenton Thomas (1879–1962), British Governor of Nyasaland, Gold Coast and the Straits Settlements
- Sheree Thomas, American writer
- Sherry Thomas (born 1975), American novelist
- Shirley Thomas (USC professor) (1920–2005), radio/television actress/writer/producer
- Shirley Thomas (athlete) (born 1963), British Olympic sprinter
- Sian Thomas (born 1953), Welsh actress
- Sidney Runyan Thomas (born 1953), American judge
- Simeon Thomas (born 1993), American football player
- Simon Thomas (disambiguation), multiple people
- Sinclair Thomas (born 1968), British Paralympic basketball player and coach
- Skylar Thomas (born 1993), Canadian soccer player
- Skyler Thomas (born 2003), American football player
- Sloan Thomas (born 1981), American football player
- Solomon Thomas (born 1995), American football player
- Sonya Thomas (born 1967), American competitive eater
- Spencer Thomas (born 1951), American football player
- Stacey Thomas (born 1978), American basketball player
- Stacey Thomas (American football) (born 1984), American football strong safety
- Stan Thomas (disambiguation), multiple people
- Star Thomas (born 2001), American football player
- Starling Thomas V (born 2000), American football player
- Stephen, Steve and Steven Thomas (disambiguation), multiple people
- Sthefany Thomas (born 1989), Argentine basketball player
- Stu Thomas (born 1967), Australian musician
- Stuart Michael Thomas (born 1970), American composer
- Sue Thomas (agent) (1950–2022), deaf FBI agent
- Sue Thomas (author) (born 1951), English author
- Sunny Thomas (1941–2025), Indian sport shooter and sport shooting coach
- Sunset Thomas (born 1972), American artist and former pornographic actress
- Susan Thomas, Baroness Thomas of Walliswood (1935–2023), British businesswoman and politician
- Sy Thomas (born 1979), British TV presenter, comedian and actor

=== T ===
- Tabby Thomas (1929–2014), American blues musician
- Taffy Thomas, English storyteller
- Tamorley Thomas (born 1983), Antiguan international footballer
- Tammy Thomas (born 1970/71), disgraced American sprint cyclist
- Tanisha Thomas (born 1985), American reality TV participant
- Tarlos Thomas (born 1977), American football player
- Taryn Thomas (born 1983), American pornographic actress
- Tasha Thomas (c. 1945–1984), American R&B and disco singer
- TaShawn Thomas (born 1993), American basketball player in the Israeli Premier League
- Tavierre Thomas (born 1996), American football player
- Tavion Thomas (born 2000), American football player
- Ted and Teddy Thomas (disambiguation), multiple people
- Tennessee Thomas (born 1984), British drummer and actress
- Terence Thomas, Baron Thomas of Macclesfield (1937–2018), British politician
- Terrance Thomas (born 1980), American basketball player
- Terrell Thomas (born 1985), American football player
- Terry Thomas (disambiguation), multiple people
- Theodore Thomas (disambiguation), multiple people
- Thom Thomas (1935–2015), American Playwright
- Thomas Thomas (disambiguation), multiple people
- T. H. Thomas (1839–1915), Welsh artist
- Thurman Thomas (born 1966), American football player
- Tiara Thomas (born 1989), American singer-songwriter
- Tillman Thomas (born 1947), Prime Minister of Grenada 2008–2013
- Timothy Thomas (disambiguation), multiple people
- Tina Louise Thomas (born 1955), American beauty pageant title holder and singer
- Tom and Tommy Thomas (disambiguation), multiple people
- Tony Thomas (disambiguation), multiple people
- Torey Thomas (born 1985), American basketball player
- Tovino Thomas (born 1989), Indian actor
- Tra Thomas (born 1974), American football player
- Tracie Thomas (born 1965), American musician and actress
- Tracy Yerkes Thomas (1899–1983), American mathematician
- Travis Thomas (born 1984), American football player
- Trevian Thomas (born 2002), American football player
- Trevor Thomas (disambiguation), multiple people
- T. Rhys Thomas (born 1982), Wales rugby union international hooker
- Tristan Thomas (born 1986), Australian hurdler
- Truth Thomas, American singer-songwriter and poet
- Tyler Thomas (born 1990), American football player
- Tyrus Thomas (born 1986), American basketball player

=== V ===
- Valentine Thomas (died 1603), English criminal
- Valerie Thomas (scientist), American scientist and inventor
- Vance Thomas, Puerto Rican attorney
- Vaneese Thomas (born August 24, 1952), American R&B, jazz and soul blues singer
- Vashti Thomas (born 1990), Panamaian track and field athlete
- Vaughan Thomas (rugby league) (born 1945), English rugby league footballer who played in the 1960s
- Vera Thomas English table tennis player
- Verneda Thomas (1936–2016), American Olympic volleyball player
- Vernon Thomas (born 1935), Anglo Indian author
- Vernon Thomas (wrestler) (1914–1957), New Zealand wrestler
- Viola Thomas (born 1939), Canadian barrel rolling champion
- Virginia Thomas (born 1957), American attorney
- Viv Thomas (born 1948), South African-born British pornographic producer
- Vivien Thomas (1910–1985), American surgical technician and medical researcher

=== W ===
- Walter Thomas (disambiguation)
- Ward Thomas (television executive) (1923–2019), British television executive
- Warren Thomas (1958–2005), American comedian
- W. Aubrey Thomas (1866–1951), U.S. Representative from Ohio
- Wayne Thomas (disambiguation), multiple people
- W. C. E. Thomas (William C. E. Thomas, 1818–1876), American civic leader
- Wendy Thomas (born 1961), American businesswoman and former mascot of Wendy's
- Wendy Thomas (politician) (born 1958 or 1959), New Hampshire state representative
- Werner Thomas (born 1931), Swiss accordionist
- Wes Thomas (born 1987), English footballer
- W. Ian Thomas (1914–2007), Christian speaker and author
- Wilfred Thomas (1875–1953), inaugural Bishop of Brandon
- Wilfrid Thomas (1904–1991) British-Australian singer and broadcaster
- Wilhelm Thomas (1892–1976), German Generalleutnant during World War II
- Will, William and Willie Thomas (disambiguation), multiple people
- Willis Thomas (born 1937), American basketball player
- W. I. Thomas (1863–1947), American sociologist

=== X ===
- Xavier Thomas (born 1999), American football player

=== Y ===
- Yann Thomas (born 1990), English rugby union footballer
- Yousif Thomas (1934–1999), Iraqi-born Chaldean Catholic archbishop
- Yvonne Thomas (1913–1990), American abstract artist

=== Z ===
- Zach Thomas (disambiguation), multiple people
- Zavion Thomas (born 2004), American football player
- Zephaniah Thomas (born 1989), English-born footballer who plays for St. Kitts and Nevis

== Fictional characters ==
- Arthur Thomas (Emmerdale), in the British soap opera Emmerdale
- Jasmine Thomas (Emmerdale), in the British soap opera Emmerdale
- Thomas the Tank Engine, and others in the Thomas & Friends franchise

== See also ==
- Thomas (disambiguation)
- Thomas (given name)
- Thomason (disambiguation)
