= Edgar Thomas =

Edgar Thomas may refer to:

- Edgar Thomas (cricketer) (1875–1936), English cricketer
- Edgar Thomas (footballer) (1895–?), Welsh international footballer

== See also ==
- Thomas (surname)
