= E. Thomas (disambiguation) =

E. Thomas may refer to:

- E. Thomas, an Italian fabric mill
- People with given name abbreviated "E." and surname Thomas
  - Earle Thomas, New Zealand international footballer
  - Edward Thomas (disambiguation), multiple people
  - Edwin Thomas (disambiguation), multiple people
  - Elizabeth Thomas (disambiguation), multiple people
  - Eric Thomas (disambiguation), multiple people
