= Vernon Thomas (disambiguation) =

Vernon Thomas (born 1935) is an Anglo-Indian writer.

Vernon Thomas may also refer to:

- Vernon Thomas (artist) (1894–1962), American artist
- Vernon Thomas (wrestler) (1914–1957), New Zealand wrestler

== See also ==
- Thomas Vernon (disambiguation)
