= Thomas Vernon =

Thomas Vernon may refer to:

- Thomas Vernon (Shropshire MP) (died 1556), MP for Shropshire
- Sir Thomas Vernon (merchant) (1631–1711), English merchant and MP for the City of London
- Thomas Vernon (lawyer) (1654–1721), Chancery lawyer and MP for Worcestershire
- Thomas Vernon (Whitchurch MP) (1666–1726), MP for Whitchurch (UK Parliament constituency)
- Thomas Vernon (Worcester MP) (1724–1771), landowner and MP for Worcester, cousin of the above
- Thomas Shrawley Vernon (1759–1825), High Sheriff of Worcestershire in 1825
- Thomas Vernon (engraver) (c. 1824–1872), English engraver
- Roy Vernon (Thomas Royston Vernon, 1937–1993), Welsh footballer
- Tom Vernon (1939–2013), British broadcaster and writer

== See also ==
- Vernon Thomas (disambiguation)
