= Patrick Thomas =

Patrick or Pat Thomas may refer to:

== Arts and entertainment ==
- Pat Thomas (American musician) (born 1964), American music journalist and musician
- Pat Thomas (Ghanaian musician) (born 1946), Ghanaian vocalist and songwriter
- Pat Thomas (journalist) (born 1959), American author
- Pat Thomas (pianist) (born 1960), British pianist
- Pat Thomas (singer) (died 1992), American jazz singer
- Patrick Thomas (actor) (born 1961), American actor
- Patrick Thomas (conductor) (1932–2017), Australian conductor
- Patrick Thomas (graphic artist) (born 1965), English artist

== Sport ==
- Pat Thomas (boxer) (born 1950), Welsh boxer
- Pat Thomas (defensive back) (born 1954), American footballer
- Pat Thomas (linebacker) (born 1983), American footballer

== Other people ==
- Pat Thomas (parasitologist) (1915–1999), Australian parasitologist who published under her maiden name Patricia Mawson
- Pat Thomas (politician) (1933–2000), North Florida politician
- Patricia M. Mawson, also known as Pat Thomas
- Patrick Thomas (businessman) (born 1947), French business executive

== See also ==
- Patricia Thompson (disambiguation)
- Patty Thomas (1922–2014), American dancer and actress
- Thomas (surname)
- Thomas Patrick (disambiguation)
