= Jessica Thomas (disambiguation) =

Jessica Thomas is a netball player.

Jessica Thomas may also refer to:

- Jessica Thomas, American-Cameroonian basketball player
- Jessica Thomas, character played by Alicia Silverstone, see List of The Wonder Years episodes
- Jessica Thomas, see History of Ashland, Kentucky#Controversies

== See also ==
- Jessie Thomas, educator
- Jesse Thomas (disambiguation)
