= Aaron Thomas =

Aaron Thomas may also refer to:

- Aaron Thomas (American football) (1937–2024), American football player
- Aaron H. Thomas, alleged East Coast rapist
- Aaron Thomas (cricketer) (born 1985), English cricketer
- Aaron Rahsaan Thomas, American television and film screenwriter and producer
- Cameron Thomas (politician) (born Aaron Cameron Thomas, 1982), British politician
- Teezo Touchdown (born 1992), American singer and rapper
