= Thomas Cecil (disambiguation) =

Thomas Cecil, Earl of Exeter, Lord Burghley and minister to Elizabeth I of England.

Thomas Cecil may also refer to:

- Thomas Cecil (engraver), English engraver who flourished about 1630
- Lord Thomas Cecil (1797–1873), British peer and member of Parliament for Stamford
- Tommy Cecil, musician who worked with Cyro Baptista

== See also ==
- Cecil Thomas (disambiguation)
