= Lindsay Thomas =

Lindsay Thomas may refer to:

- Lindsay Thomas (politician) (born 1943), American politician and businessman
- Lindsay Thomas (actress) (1978–2010), Canadian stage actress
- Lindsay Thomas (footballer, born 1988), Australian rules footballer for North Melbourne and Port Adelaide
- Lindsay Thomas (footballer, born 1955), Australian rules footballer for St Kilda
