= Gerald Thomas (disambiguation) =

Gerald Thomas (1920–1993) was an English film director.

Gerald Thomas may also refer to:

- Gerald Thomas (theatre director) (born 1954), Brazilian-American theater director and writer
- Gerald C. Thomas (1894–1984), United States Marine Corps general
- Gerald Eustis Thomas (1929–2019), American admiral, diplomat and academic
- Gerald W. Thomas (1919–2013), president emeritus of New Mexico State University

== See also ==
- Gerard Thomas (1663–1721), Flemish Baroque painter
- Gerry Thomas (1922–2005), American salesman
- Jerry Thomas (disambiguation)
