= Harvey Thomas =

Harvey Thomas may refer to:

- Harvey Thomas (luthier), American luthier
- Harvey Thomas (footballer) (born 2005), Australian rules footballer
