= Clive Thomas =

Clive Thomas may refer to:

- Clive Thomas (football) (born 1936), Welsh football referee
- Clive Eric Thomas (born 1971), Anglican archdeacon
- Clive Y. Thomas (born 1938), Guyanese economics professor and political activist
