= Calvin Thomas =

Calvin Thomas may refer to:

- Calvin Thomas (actor) (1885–1964), American actor
- Calvin Thomas (critical theorist) (born 1956), American professor of critical theory, modern and postmodern literature and culture
- Calvin Thomas (director) (born 1986), Canadian filmmaker
- Calvin Thomas (linguist) (1854–1919), American scholar, and professor of Germanic languages
- Cal Thomas (born 1942), columnist and former Vice President of the Moral Majority
- Calvin Thomas (American football) (born 1960), former professional American football player
- Cal Thomas (American football) (1915–1982), professional football player
- Calvin Thomas, Yoshukai Karate practitioner
