= Mark Thomas (disambiguation) =

Mark Thomas (born 1963) is a British comedian and political activist.

Mark Thomas may also refer to:

- Mark Thomas (MP), English politician who sat in the House of Commons in 1659
- Mark Thomas (flutist) (1931-2022), American flutist
- Mark Thomas (composer) (c.1956-2023), Welsh film score composer
- Mark Thomas (rugby league) (born 1963), Australian rugby league footballer
- Mark Thomas (weightlifter) (born 1963), British weightlifter
- Mark G. Thomas (born 1964), British evolutionary geneticist
- Mark Thomas (sprinter) (born 1965), British sprinter
- Mark Thomas (newspaper editor) (born 1967), former editor of The People
- Mark Thomas (defensive end) (born 1969), American football defensive end
- Mark Thomas (tight end) (born 1976), American football tight end
- Mark Thomas (cricketer) (born 1977), English cricketer
- Mark Thomas (ice hockey) (born 1983), English ice hockey player
- Mark Thomas (bank robber), a member of the Aryan Republican Army, who robbed 22 Midwest US banks

== See also ==
- Marc Thomas (disambiguation)
- Marcus Thomas (disambiguation)
