= Walter Thomas =

Walter Thomas may refer to:

- Walter Thomas (baseball) (1911–1983), American Negro league baseball player
- Walter Thomas (musician) (1907–1981), saxophonist and arranger in Cab Calloway's orchestra
- Walter Aubrey Thomas (1864–1934), British architect
- Brandon Thomas (playwright) (Walter Brandon Thomas, 1848–1914), British playwright
- Walter Babington Thomas (1919–2017), known as Sandy, New Zealand-born British general
- Walter W. Thomas (1849–1912), English architect
- Walter Horstmann Thomas (1876–1948), American architect
- Walter Thomas (priest), Church of Ireland priest

== See also ==
- Walt Thomas (William Walter Thomas), American baseball player
- Thomas Walter (disambiguation)
