= Zachary Thompson =

Zac, Zach, Zack, Zak, or Zachary Thompson may refer to:

- Zac Thompson (born 1993), English footballer
- Zach Thompson (American football) (born 1991), American gridiron football player
- Zach Thompson (baseball) (born 1993), American right-handed baseball pitcher
- Zack Thompson (born 1997), American left-handed baseball pitcher

== See also ==
- Zach Thomas (disambiguation)
