= Jesse Thomas =

Jesse Thomas may refer to:

- Jesse Thomas (musician) (1911–1995), blues guitarist and singer from Louisiana
- Jesse Thomas (American football) (1928–2012), American pro football player in the NFL, AFL and CFL
- Jesse B. Thomas (1777–1853), U.S. politician
- Jesse Thomas (triathlete) (born 1980), American triathlete and steeplechase runner
- Jesse B. Thomas Jr. (1806–1850), Illinois politician

== See also ==
- Jessie O. Thomas (1885–1972), educator
- Jess Thomas (1927–1993), American operatic tenor
- Jessica Thomas (disambiguation)
