= Marc Thomas =

Marc Thomas may refer to:

- Marc Thomas (computer scientist) (1950–2017), American mathematician
- Marc Thomas (rugby union) (born 1990), Welsh rugby union player

== See also ==
- Mark Thomas (disambiguation)
