= Leslie Thomas (disambiguation) =

Leslie Thomas (1931–2014) was a British author

Leslie or Les Thomas may also refer to:

- Les Thomas (rugby), Welsh rugby union and rugby league footballer who played in the 1940s
- Les Thomas (footballer) (1906–1997), Australian footballer for Collingwood
- Les Thomas (politician), American politician in the state of Washington
- Leslie Thomas (politician) (1906–1971), British Conservative politician
- Leslie Thomas (barrister) (born 1965), British barrister
