= Daniel Thomas =

Daniel, Danny or Dan Thomas may refer to:

== Law and politics ==
- Daniel M. Thomas (1809–1894), early politician in California, United States
- Daniel Lleufer Thomas (1863–1940), Welsh magistrate and reformer
- Daniel Holcombe Thomas (1906–2000), U.S. federal judge
- Dan Thomas (born c. 1981), British politician
- Danny Tommo (Daniel Thomas, born 1988), British far-right activist

== Sport ==
- Dan Thomas (infielder) (fl. 1927–1931), American baseball player
- Dan Thomas (outfielder) (fl. 1939–1940), American baseball player
- Daniel Thomas (sprinter) (born 1937), Tanzanian sprinter
- Danny Thomas (baseball) (1951–1980), American baseball player
- Danny Thomas (footballer, born 1961), English foornaller
- Danny Thomas (footballer, born 1981), English footballer
- Danny Thomas (footballer, born 1985), Welsh footballer
- Daniel Thomas (running back) (born 1987), American football player
- Dan Thomas (footballer) (born 1991), English footballer
- Dan Thomas (rugby union) (born 1993), Welsh rugby union player
- Daniel Thomas (safety) (born 1998), American football player
- Danny Thomas (tennis) (born 1999), American tennis player

== Other people ==
- Daniel Remshart Thomas (1843–1915), American businessman
- Danny Thomas (1912–1991), American entertainer
- Danny Thomas (drummer) (born 1948), American drummer
- Daniel Edward Thomas (born 1959), American Catholic bishop

== Fictional characters ==
- Daniel Thomas (Emmerdale), in the British TV soap opera Emmerdale
