= Edwin Thomas =

Edwin Thomas may refer to:

- Edwin Thomas (novelist) (born 1977), English historical novelist
- Edwin Stark Thomas (1872–1952), American judge
- Edwin Thomas Maynard (1878–1961), known as Edwin Thomas, Welsh international rugby player
- Edwin Thomas (rugby league), English rugby league footballer of the 1920s and 1930s
- Eddie Thomas (footballer, born 1932) (1932–2020), English footballer
- Edwin Thomas (actor) (born 1987), English actor
- Edwin Lorimer Thomas, American physicist
- Edwin Ross Thomas (1850–1936), founder of Thomas Motor Company
