= Alfred Thomas =

Alfred Thomas may refer to:

- Alfred Thomas, 1st Baron Pontypridd
- Alfred Delavan Thomas (1837–1896), US federal judge
- Alfred Brumwell Thomas (1868–1948), English architect
- Alfred Thomas (boxer) (born 1949), Guyanese boxer
- Alfred Thomas (footballer) (1895–19??), English footballer
- Alfred Thomas (bowls) (1899–19??), Welsh bowls player
