= Thomas Terry =

Thomas or Tom Terry may refer to:

- Tomás Terry (died 1886), Cuban business magnate
- Thomas D. Terry (1816–1897), president of Santa Clara University
- Tom Terry (meteorologist) (born 1969), television meteorologist
- Tom Terry (author), author and broadcaster
- Terry-Thomas (1911–1990), who used this stage name for a short while

== See also ==
- Terry Thomas (disambiguation)
