= Ron Thomas =

Ron Thomas may refer to:

- Ron Thomas (basketball) (1950–2018), American basketball forward
- Ron Thomas (footballer) (born 1948), Australian rules footballer
- Ron Thomas (bowls) (1928–?), Welsh indoor and lawn bowler
- Ron Thomas (tennis) (1888–1936), Australian tennis player
- Ron Thomas (actor), American actor in The Karate Kid and Cobra Kai playing Bobby Brown

== See also ==
- Ronald Thomas (disambiguation)
