= Kevin Thomas =

Kevin Thomas may refer to:

- Kevin Thomas (center) (born 1964), American football center for the Tampa Bay Buccaneers
- Kevin Thomas (cornerback, born 1978), American football cornerback for the Buffalo Bills
- Kevin Thomas (cornerback, born 1986), American football cornerback for the Philadelphia Eagles
- Kevin Thomas (film critic) (born 1936), entertainment writer for the Los Angeles Times
- Kevin Thomas (footballer, born 1944) (1944–2022), English football (soccer) player
- Kevin Thomas (footballer, born 1975), Scottish football (soccer) player
- Kevin Thomas (cricketer) (born 1963), former English cricketer
- Kevin Thomas (politician) (born 1984), American politician

== See also ==
- Kevin Thoms (born 1979), American television/film actor and voice actor
