= Jerry Thomas =

Jerry Thomas may refer to:

- Jerry Thomas (bartender) (1830–1885), American bartender
- Jerry Thomas (baseball) (1936–2026), American baseball player
- Jerry Thomas (Florida politician) (1929–1980), American banker and politician
- Jerry Thomas (Louisiana politician) (1953–2023), American politician
- Jerry Thomas (Royal Marines officer), British general

== See also ==
- Gerry Thomas (1922–2005), salesman
- Jeremy Thomas (born 1949), British film producer
- Gerard Thomas (1663–1721), painter
- Gerald Thomas (disambiguation)
