= Lawrence Thomas =

Lawrence Thomas may refer to:

- Lawrence Thomas (soccer) (born 1992), Australian footballer
- Lawrence S. Thomas III, American brigadier general
- Lawrence Thomas (American football) (born 1993), American football defensive end
- Lawrence Thomas (priest) (1889–1960), Archdeacon of Margam

== See also ==
- Laurence Thomas, American philosopher
- Larry Thomas (disambiguation)
