= Benjamin Thomas =

Benjamin or Ben Thomas may refer to:

== Arts and entertainment ==
- Ben Thomas (photographer) (born 1981), Australian photographer
- Benny Ninja (Benjamin Thomas), American dancer and choreographer
- Ben Thomas (actor), Australian actor

== Sports ==
- Ben Thomas (American football) (born 1961), American football player
- Benjamin Thomas (cricketer) (born 1989), Indian cricketer
- Benjamin Thomas (cyclist) (born 1995), French cyclist
- Ben Thomas (ice hockey) (born 1996), Canadian ice hockey player
- Ben Thomas (rugby league) (born 1997), Australian rugby league footballer
- Ben Thomas (rugby union) (born 1998), Welsh rugby union player
- Ben Thomas (bowls), Welsh lawn bowler

== Others ==
- Benjamin Thomas (politician) (1813–1878), American politician and judge in Massachusetts
- Benjamin Thomas (industrialist) (1860–1914), American businessman
- Sir Ben Bowen Thomas (1899–1977), Welsh civil servant and university president
- Benjamin P. Thomas (1902–1956), American historian

== See also ==
- Lynching of Benjamin Thomas, Infamous 1899 American murder
- Thomas (surname)
