= Rose Thomas =

Rose Thomas or Rosie Thomas may refer to:

== People ==
- Rosie Thomas (writer) (born 1947), pen name of Welsh romance novelist
- Rosie Thomas (singer-songwriter), American musician and comedian
- Rose Thomas (rugby union) (born 1988), French rugby sevens 2016 Olympian
- Rose Thomas (field hockey) (born 1992), Welsh goalkeeper, also for Great Britain
- Rose Fay Thomas (1852–1929), American writer and advocate for animals

== Fictional characters ==
- Rosé Thomas, a Fullmetal Alchemist character

== See also ==
- Rosemary Thomas (1901–1961), American poet and teacher
- Rosa Graham Thomas, award-winning British shrub named in 1983 for horticulturalist Graham Thomas
