= Eric Thomas =

Eric Thomas or Erik Thomas may refer to:

- Eric Thomas (motivational speaker) (born 1970), American motivational speaker
- Eric Thomas (cornerback) (born 1964), former American football player
- Eric Thomas (wide receiver) (born 1991), arena football player
- Eric Thomas (hurdler) (1973–2022), American track and field athlete
- Eric Thomas (gynaecologist) (1953–2023), Vice-Chancellor of the University of Bristol
- Eric Thomas, inventor of LISTSERV
- Eric Thomas (offensive lineman) in 2007 Austin Wranglers season
- Eric Thomas (soccer), member of the Football Hall of Fame Western Australia
- Erik Thomas (basketball) (born 1993), Argentinian basketball player
- R. Eric Thomas (born c. 1982), American author, playwright, television writer and advice columnist

== See also ==
- E. Thomas (disambiguation)
- Thomas (surname)
