= Anthony Thomas =

Anthony Thomas may refer to:

- Anthony Thomas (American football) (born 1977), American football player
- Anthony Thomas (English footballer) (born 1982), English footballer with Hemel Hempstead Town, Barnet and Cambridge City
- Anthony William Thomas (born 1949), Australian professor of physics at the University of Adelaide
- Anthony Richard Thomas, former British Ambassador to Angola and High Commissioner to Jamaica

== See also ==
- Antony Thomas (born 1940), English filmmaker
- Tony Thomas (disambiguation)
- Antonio Thomas (disambiguation)
