= Reginald Thomas =

Reginald, Reggie or Reg Thomas may refer to:

- Reg Thomas (runner) (1907–1946), Welsh middle-distance runner
- Reg Thomas (English footballer) (1912–1983), English footballer
- Reg Thomas (Australian footballer) (1909–1966), Australian rules footballer
- Reg Thomas (ice hockey) (born 1953), Canadian ice hockey player
- Reggie Thomas (born 1953), American politician
- Reginald Thomas and Reggie (wrestler), ring names of American professional wrestler and former acrobat Sidney Iking Bateman (born 1993)
