= Simon Thomas =

Simon Thomas may refer to:

- Simon Thomas (politician) (born 1963), Welsh politician, Plaid Cymru MP for Ceredigion 2000–05
- Simon Thomas (presenter) (born 1972 or 1973), English television presenter
- Simon Thomas (footballer) (born 1984), English football player
- Simon Thomas (soccer) (born 1990), Canadian football player
