= Andrew Thomas =

Andrew or Andy Thomas may refer to:

== Arts and entertainment ==
- Andrew J. Thomas (1875–1965), American architect
- Andrew Thomas (composer) (1939–2026), American composer and musician

== Sports ==
- Andy Thomas (footballer, born 1962), English footballer
- Andy Thomas (footballer, born 1977), English footballer
- Andy Thomas (footballer, born 1982), English footballer
- Andrew Thomas (soccer, born 1998), Russian footballer of English-American descent
- Andrew Thomas (American football) (born 1999), American football offensive tackle
- Andrew Thomas (ice hockey) (born 1985), American ice hockey player

== Others ==
- A. R. B. Thomas (Andrew Rowland Benedick Thomas, 1904–1985), English chess player
- Andrew Thomas (Australian politician) (1936–2011), Australian senator
- Andy Thomas (born 1951), Australian astronaut
- Andrew Thomas (American politician) (born 1966), American county attorney in Arizona
