= Margaret Thomas (disambiguation) =

Margaret Thomas (1842–1929) was an English-born Australian travel writer, poet and artist.

Margaret Thomas may also refer to:

- Margaret Murie (1902–2003), American conservationist born Margaret Thomas
- Margaret Thomas (hymnwriter) (1779–18??), Welsh hymnwriter
- Margaret Thomas (painter) (1916–2016), British artist
- Margaret Thomas (sport shooter) (born 1953), British sport shooter
- Margaret Haig Thomas, 2nd Viscountess Rhondda (1883–1958), Welsh noblewoman, businesswoman, and suffragette
- Marlo Thomas (born 1937), American actress, producer, author, and social activist, born Margaret Julia Thomas

== See also ==
- Margaret Thomas-Neale (born 1931), British gymnast
