= Carl Thomas =

Carl Thomas may refer to:

- Carl Thomas (baseball) (1932–2013), American Major League Baseball pitcher
- Carl Thomas (basketball) (born 1969), American basketball player
- Carl Thomas (singer) (born 1970), American R&B singer
- Tre Thomas (Carl Grady Thomas III, born 1975), American football player
- Carl Thomas, member of dance music group K-Klass
- Carl Thomas, fictional character in On Beauty

== See also ==
- Karl Thomas (disambiguation)
