= Rhys Thomas =

Rhys Thomas may refer to:

- Rhys ap Thomas (1449–1525), Welsh soldier and landholder
- Rhys Thomas (juggler) (born 1963), American juggler
- Rhys Thomas (comedian) (born 1978), English comedian and actor
- Rhys Thomas (director) (born 1979), Welsh television director, Saturday Night Live
- Rhys M. Thomas (born 1982), Wales rugby union international prop 2007
- T. Rhys Thomas (born 1982), Wales rugby union international hooker 2007
