= Karl Thomas (disambiguation) =

Karl Thomas (1871–1900) was an American sailor.

Karl Thomas may also refer to:

- Karl Thomas (cricketer)
- Karl Thomas, Prince of Löwenstein-Wertheim-Rosenberg (1783–1849)
- Karl O. Thomas (born 1963), American admiral who serves as the commander of the United States Seventh Fleet

== See also ==
- Carl Thomas (disambiguation)
