= Gary Thomas =

Gary Thomas may refer to:

- Gary Thomas (academic) (1938–2008), American academic
- Gary Thomas (author) (born 1961), American Christian writer
- Gary Thomas (cricketer, born 1973), English cricketer
- Gary Thomas (cricketer, born 1958), English cricketer
- Gary Thomas (musician) (born 1960), American jazz saxophonist
- Father Gary Thomas, American exorcist and consultant to the film The Rite
- Gary L. Thomas (game designer), American game designer
- Gary W. Thomas (1938–2017), American prosecutor and judge wounded in the Marin County courthouse incident
- Gary L. Thomas (general) (born 1962), U.S. Marine Corps general

== See also ==
- USS Thomas J. Gary, an Edsall-class destroyer escort
- Gareth Thomas (disambiguation)
