= Lee Thomas =

Lee Thomas may refer to:

- Lee Arden Thomas (1886–1953), American architect
- Lee Thomas (baseball) (1936–2022), American baseball player and executive
- Lee M. Thomas (born 1944), head of the United States Environmental Protection Agency, 1985–1989
- Lee Thomas (reporter) (born 1967), American reporter and author of Turning White
- Lee Thomas (rugby union) (born 1984), rugby player
- Lee Thomas (horror writer), horror writer of Stained and The Dust of Wonderland

== See also ==
- Thomas Lee (disambiguation)
