= Lindsay Thomas (footballer, born 1955) =

Australian rules footballer

Personal information
- Full name: Lindsay Thomas
- Born: 6 October 1955 (age 71)
- Original team: City South
- Height: 193 cm (6 ft 4 in)
- Weight: 91 kg (201 lb)

Playing career^{1}
Years	Club	Games (Goals)
1975	St Kilda	4 (0)
- ^{1} Playing statistics correct to the end of 1975.

Lindsay Thomas (born 6 October 1955) is a former Australian rules footballer who played with St Kilda in the Victorian Football League (VFL).
