= Jeffrey Thomas =

Jeffrey or Jeff Thomas may refer to:

- Jeff Thomas (boxer) (born 1981), British professional boxer
- Jeff Thomas (cricketer) (born 1971), Australian cricketer
- Jeff Thomas (curler) (born 1954), Canadian curler and coach
- Jeff Thomas (footballer) (born 1949), Welsh footballer for Newport County
- Jeff Thomas (photographer) (born 1956), Canadian photographer
- Jeff Thomas (wide receiver) (born 1998), American football wide receiver
- Jeffrey Thomas (actor), Welsh actor and writer
- Jeffrey Thomas (musician), artistic director of the American Bach Soloists
- Jeffrey Thomas (politician) (1933–1989), British politician
- Jeffrey Thomas (writer) (born 1957), American horror and science fiction writer
- Jeff Thomas (model) (1987–2023), American model and Peter Thiel's boyfriend prior to his death

== See also ==
- Geoffrey Thomas (disambiguation)
