= Philip Thomas =

Philip Thomas may refer to:

- Philip E. Thomas (1776–1861), American railway executive
- Philip Francis Thomas (1810–1890), American legislator
- Philip J. Thomas (1921–2007), Canadian folklorist
- Philip Michael Thomas (born 1949), American actor
- Philip Thomas (cricketer) (born 1978), English cricketer
- Sir Philip Thomas (diplomat), British diplomat
- Phil Thomas (rugby) (1877–1915), Welsh rugby union and rugby league footballer who played in the 1900s and 1910s
- Phil Thomas (footballer) (1952–1998), English footballer
- Philip Thomas (born 1965), Jamaican singer, better known as Cutty Ranks
- Phil Thomas (cyclist) (1916-2004), Australian cyclist

== See also ==
- Philippa Thomas (born 1965), British newsreader and journalist
- Phillip Thomas (born 1989), American footballer
