= Prince Varughese Thomas =

Artist

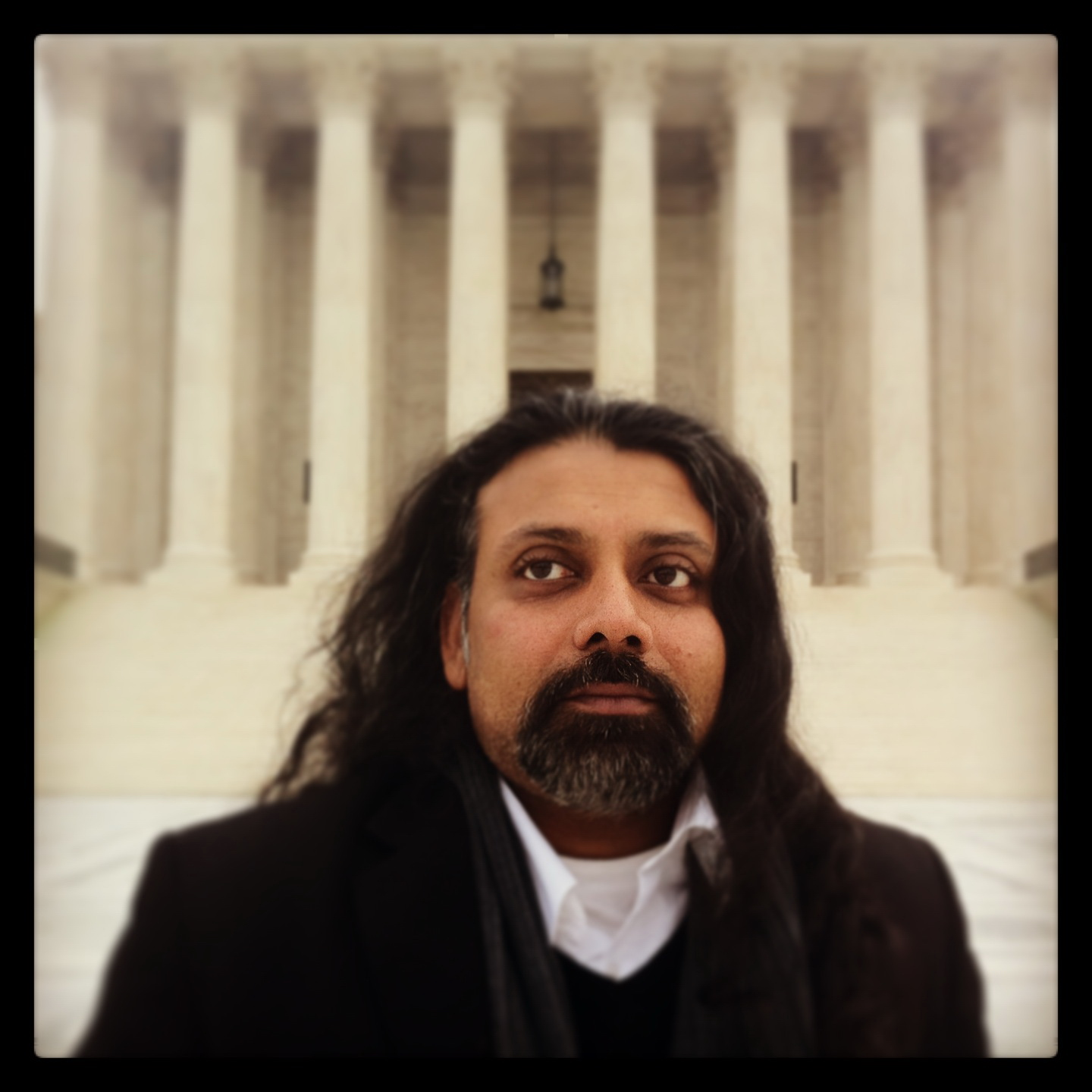
- Born: Prince Varughese Kapplingattil Thomas; July 23, 1969 (age 56); Kuwait City, Kuwait
- Education: University of Houston; University of Texas at Arlington
- Known for: Photography, Video Art, Digital Art, Installation Art
- Notable work: That Was Then, 2014; Body Count, 2008-2012
- Spouse: Britt Thomas
- Awards: ArtPrize 7 Juried Award in Time-Based Media
- Website: princevthomas.com

Prince Varughese Thomas (Prince Varughese Kapplingattil Thomas, born 1969) is a multi-media artist who is part of what has come to be known as the Indian Diaspora. Thomas had actually been born in Kuwait, the son of Christian, Malayalam-speaking guest workers from India's southern Kerala state. Being Indian by birth, born in Kuwait, naturalized in the US, and raised primarily between India and the United States, he has always felt outside the dominant culture in which he exists. This sense of being the ‘Other’ has influenced how he views the world, approaches his conceptual concerns, and creates art. With an educational background and degrees in both psychology and art, he investigates and deconstructs complex sociopolitical issues from the interstices in personally expressive ways that humanize his subjects by incorporating a variety of photographic, video, drawing, and installation techniques into his artwork. Thomas currently resides in Houston, Texas. He is an associate professor of art at Lamar University in Beaumont, Texas. He is represented by Hooks-Epstein Galleries in Houston, Texas.

== Education ==
Thomas received his B.A. in psychology from the University of Texas at Arlington, and M.F.A. from the University of Houston.

== Major works ==
=== That Was Then (2014) ===
That Was Then is a Single Channel Video with the actual audio reporting of the first hours of Operation Desert Storm on CNN. It takes the viewer through the initial bombing stage of Baghdad in 1991 with reporters Peter Arnett, Bernard Shaw, and John Holliman. The live coverage was significant because it was unedited and established CNN as a credible news agency. It also established the notion of 24-hour news as a viable business model. Prince Thomas remembered as a young man watching the CNN footage and thinking, like most Americans, that the footage looked like a video game. It looked hyper-real. He synched this audio with video footage he recorded from a Fourth of July fireworks display to comment on the close link between the past and present.

- This video was selected as the juried award winner at ArtPrize 7 in the Time-Based category in 2015. It was selected by Time-Based juror Shari Frilot, Los Angeles-based Senior Programmer of Sundance Film Festival and Curator of New Frontier at Sundance. Frilot pointed to the deceptive simplicity of Thomas’ piece, saying “It’s a simple juxtaposition of a fireworks show and the CNN coverage of the first gulf war attack, but as the piece goes on it expresses how war is narrativized, not only in contemporary warfare but in the way we celebrate war. The piece links its critique and message to something that we kind of universally relate to in America - because we’ve experienced it.”

=== Body Count (2008-2012) ===
Body Count is a project that seeks to question the value of civilian life in times of warfare. This piece focuses on civilian deaths that are a direct result of US involvement in Iraq. Thomas chose to use the conservative numbers being collected by the Iraq Body Count project (IBC), whose numbers come from verifiable civilian deaths reported to the media, as the basis for this piece.

As the viewer enters the space, on white tables stacked in rows of 25, sits over 109,000 US pennies all painted white. Each US penny represents one civilian life. A single penny in its own right is very insignificant and devoid of any real value. And, like pennies being thrown into a jar at the end of a day, the total deaths in any given day of war can be easily processed, reconciled, and forgotten. But to be confronted by the vast numbers all at once is a far more difficult thing to ignore and, I hope, an emotionally arresting experience. This piece is also intended to subtly question the relationship between commerce and war as was questioned by President Eisenhower in describing the Military/Industrial Complex.

The counting system for this piece is as follows: each stack of pennies equates to 25 lives; one gap between the stacks of pennies indicates a separation of months; and two gaps indicate a separation of years.

=== K.I.A. (2012) ===
K.I.A. is an ongoing series of works on paper that seeks to raise awareness of the incredible number of US lives that have been lost through warfare. This series focuses on US soldiers that have been killed in action since the start of the second gulf war. Each work focuses on a specific state in the United States and the soldiers that have died in action from that particular state. In a predefined area on a piece of Arches watercolor paper, Prince Thomas intuitively begins writing each soldier's name who has been killed in action. The density of the drawing increases as one soldier's name is written over another. The dense black areas in the drawing are thereby created by writing each individuals name over another reflecting the sheer numbers of people that have been affected by war. The drawing is finished when the last soldier's name is written on the paper. The title of each piece reflects the US state from which the soldiers originated (e.g. California, Texas, Alabama, etc.).

- When exhibited in Asia Society Texas Center's exhibition Site Lines, Houston Chronicle writer Molly Glentzer wrote, "'K.I.A. (Texas)' memorializes 427 Texas-based soldiers who have died in Iraq. Their names are layered to the point of abstraction, held within a circle that evokes a Zen Buddhist enso, a symbol that can refer both to enlightenment and a void."

=== On Joy, On Sorrow (2009) ===
‘’On Joy, On Sorrow’’ is a two-channel video displayed separately across from one another, creating a visual and auditory dialog. The video juxtaposes two abstractly conveyed interdependent emotions. The work is personal and stems from events in Thomas’s life that have led him to recognize the threads that run between both emotions. It is inspired by poet Kahlil Gibran’s quote, “Your joy is your sorrow unmasked”. The original music is scored in collaboration with composer, Joel Love.

- "One water-like fluid rhythmically falls like rain while the other blood-like reacts like two slow motion flickering candle flames. They are reminiscent of Bill Viola´s videos with fire and water but without the human form. One screen seems to initially evoke joy and then moves into sorrow; while the other begins more sorrowfully and moves towards joy, though the ambiguity of the piece leaves this interpretation open."
- "The flame vacillates between threatening to be snuffed out and spinning ecstatically like a whirling dervish; the water shifts between drizzle, downpour and dissipation. It’s a beautiful piece that feels cleansing to watch."

=== Liquid Sky (2009) ===
"In 2005, I became the primary caregiver to both my elderly parents. Through this transition in our lives, I have been keenly aware of the changes that come with the process of aging. I am using this experience to create a body of work that speaks to what I can best describe as the Doctrine of Impermanence. The Impermanence Doctrine states that all aspects of the world are in a process of constant change. Life embodies change through the process of aging, the cycle of birth and rebirth, and in every loss that we experience. Due to the impermanent nature of all things, having attachments to them is futile and only leads to pain and suffering. Reflections in water, like the landscape, are constantly in flux and never remain the same for very long. I feel that the intangible nature of the landscape and its reflection is my honest and direct response to conveying the idea of impermanence. The series Liquid Sky represents a combination of Digital and Alternative Processes Photography. Unlike my previous projects, in this series I am working from a traditional straight photographic shooting method. The formal content of the images in this series are exactly the same as when I shot them through the camera lens. The final images consist of combining the straight photographs with emulsion transfers of the same image."

=== Fashion Accessories (2002-2006) ===
‘’Fashion Accessories’’ metaphorically explores the intersections of popular culture, science and commerce. With the up tick of “designer drugs” in recent years, released as an answer to various personal enhancements, Thomas asks the viewer to question the use of pharmaceutical science and technology in our everyday lives. The series consists of twenty diptychs (40 images, 45 inches by 45 inches each) created through a combination of chemical, alternative and digital photographic techniques.

- "It is an endearing marriage of high and low."

== Museums ==
Museums where his work has been shown:

- Station Museum of Contemporary Art, Houston, TX
- The Fed Galleries @ Kendall College of Art and Design, Grand Rapids, MI
- Queens Museum of Art, New York
- Zentralbibliothek Zürich, Zurich
- Museum of Fine Arts, Houston
- the Gallery of the National Library of Argentina
- Bunker 8, Beijing, China
- Center for the Visual Arts, Toledo, OH
- Society for Contemporary Photography, Kansas City, MO
- Museum of New Art, Detroit, MI
- The Alternative Museum, NY, NY
- the Light Factory, Charlotte, NC
- Museum of Contemporary Art of Georgia
- Art Museum of Southeast Texas, Beaumont, Texas

== Collections ==
His work is represented in the collections of the Museum of Fine Arts, Houston, the Art Museum of Southeast Texas, George Bush Intercontinental Airport and the City of Houston.

== Awards ==
- Houston Arts Alliance Support for Artists and Creative Individuals Grant 2018
- ArtPrize 7 Juried Award Winner in Time-Based Media, 2015
- The Hunting Art Prize Finalist, 2014
- Texas Biennial Artist, 2013
- Houston Center for Photography Carol Crow Memorial Fellowship, 2009
- First Place Award, Works On Paper 2000, LSU; Baton Rouge, Louisiana, 2001
- Cultural Arts Council of Houston & Harris County Artist Fellowship Award, 1999

== Lectures ==
- “Faking What? Photography’s Love Affair with Science & Technology”, Museum of Fine Arts, Houston, 2013
- Video Jam, Contemporary Arts Museum, Houston, 2012
