= Daniel M. Thomas =

American politician

Daniel Monroe Thomas (December 27, 1809 – March 21, 1894) was an early California politician and pioneer to Los Angeles. He served on the second Los Angeles County Board of Supervisors from 1853 to 1854, and was the first county judge for San Bernardino County, California.

Born in Rockingham, North Carolina, Thomas was baptized into the Church of Latter Day Saints in 1844 and moved to Utah in 1847. By the 1850s, he had travelled to California, where Thomas was a leading activist in the establishment of San Bernardino County, and once was established, Thomas was elected as its first County Judge in January 1853. Outside of his political and judicial activities, he was a farmer.

A 1922 account noted that "Daniel M. Thomas, who was elected with the first officers of the county at a special election held under the act creating the county in June, 1853, had the distinction of being the first county judge of San Bernardino County, and in the following fall, at the regular election, was chosen to succeed himself for a full term of four years. While he had no training in the law, he was a man of fair education and wielded some influence among his people, the Mormons, with whom he returned to Salt Lake in 1857".

In 1859, Thomas was elected a probate judge in the Utah Territory. serving until 1865. Thomas died in St. George, Utah Territory, at the age of 84.
