= Kelly Thomas (disambiguation) =

Kelly Thomas may refer to:

- Kelly Thomas (American football) (born 1960), American former professional football player
- Kelly Thomas (born 1981), British bobsledder
- Killing of Kelly Thomas (1974–2011), American man who was beaten to death

== See also ==
- Nelly Thomas, Australian comedian, educator, author, and broadcaster
