= Helen Thomas (disambiguation) =

Helen Thomas (1920–2013) was an American journalist.

Helen Thomas could also refer to:

- Helen L. Thomas (1905–1997), American historian and scientist
- Helen Thomas (activist) (1966–1989), Welsh peace activist
- Helen Thomas Dranga (1866–1927), British-American painter
