= Terry Thomas =

Terry Thomas may refer to:

- Terry-Thomas (1911–1990), English comic actor
- Terry Thomas (basketball) (1953–1998), American NBA player
- Terence Thomas, Baron Thomas of Macclesfield (1937–2018), British peer
- Terry Thomas (musician), founding member of the British rock band Charlie and record producer
- Terry Thomas (athlete) (born 1997), Jamaican sprinter

== See also ==
- Thomas Terry (disambiguation)
