= Olivia Thomas =

Olivia Thomas may refer to:

- Olivia Thomas (cricketer) (born 2004), English cricketer
- Olivia Thomas (soccer) (born 2005), American soccer player
- Olivia Jordan Thomas (born 1988), American actress, model, and beauty queen
