= Ivor Thomas =

Ivor Thomas may refer to:

- Ivor Thomas (sculptor) (1873–1913), British sculptor, brother of Bert Thomas
- Ivor Thomas (trade unionist) (1875–1963), Welsh trade unionist and socialist activist
- Sir Ivor Thomas (British Army officer) (1893–1972), British Army general
- Ivor Owen Thomas (1898–1982), British trade unionist and Labour Party politician
- Ivor Thomas (rugby union) (1900–1995), Welsh international rugby union player
- Ivor Bulmer-Thomas (born Ivor Thomas, 1905–1993), British journalist and politician
- Ivor Thomas (boxer), 19th-century Welsh boxer, see Boxing in Wales
- Ivor Thomas (golfer), English golfer, winner of the Golf Illustrated Gold Vase in 1935
