= Raymond Thomas =

Raymond Thomas may refer to:

- Raymond Thomas (athlete) (1931–2002), French shot putter
- Raymond Thomas (cyclist) (born 1968), Jamaican cyclist
- Raymond A. Thomas (born 1958), retired U.S. Army general

== See also ==
- Ray Thomas (disambiguation)
