= Les Thomas (footballer) =

Australian rules footballer

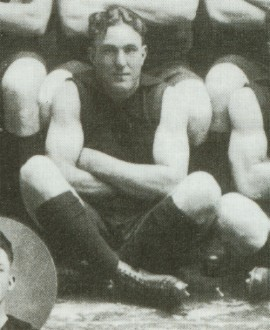
- Thomas in 1928

Personal information
- Full name: Leslie Frank Thomas
- Born: 28 May 1906; Goodwood, South Australia
- Died: 13 August 1997 (aged 91); Adelaide, South Australia
- Original team: Coo-ee Juniors
- Height: 162 cm (5 ft 4 in)
- Weight: 73 kg (161 lb)
- Position: Rover

Playing career^{1}
Years	Club	Games (Goals)
1925–1927	West Adelaide	18 (18)
1928	Collingwood	2 (0)
1929–1930	Sturt	18 (15)
- ^{1} Playing statistics correct to the end of 1930.

Les Thomas (28 May 1906 – 13 August 1997) was an Australian rules footballer who played with Collingwood in the Victorian Football League (VFL).
