= Walter Thomas (priest) =

- Church: Church of Ireland

Personal details
- Born: Athlone
- Died: June 1743

The Ven. Walter Thomas was a Church of Ireland priest in the first half of the 18th century.

== Biography ==
Walter Thomas was born in Athlone and educated at Trinity College there. He was Archdeacon of Killaloe from 1714 to 1715. He may be the same Walter Thomas who was Precentor of Cashel from 1715 to 1720; then Treasurer of Cashel from 1721 until his resignation on 16 April 1737, and for many years Rector of Thurles. His son George was Treasurer of Cashel from 1737 to 1768.

He also involved himself with the political, social, and religious issues of his time. On 18 September 1727 he informed William Smyth that John Allen was going to vote for Robert French and John King, and thus get over his engagement to Lowther. The same year, he opposed Benjamin Holme at a Quakers Meeting held in Thurles.

He died in June 1743.

== Sources ==
- Blacker, Beaver Henry (1860). Brief sketches of the parishes of Booterstown and Donnybrook. Dublin: George Herbert.
- Cotton, Henry (1851). Fasti ecclesiae hibernicae: the succession of the prelates and members of the cathedral bodies in Ireland. Dublin: Hodges and Smith.
- Malcomson, Anthony Peter William (2006), Papers of the family of Smythe of Barbavilla (PDF), Dublin: National Library of Ireland
- Wight, Thomas; Rutty, Thomas (1800). A history of the rise and progress of the people called Quakers: in Ireland, from the year 1653 to 1700 (2nd ed.). London: William Phillips, George Yard and Lombard Street.
