= Clive Eric Thomas =

Anglican Archdeacon of St. Vincent and the Grenadines

The Venerable Clive Eric Thomas is the Anglican Archdeacon of St. Vincent and the Grenadines.

== Early life and education ==
He was born on 24 November 1971 to Stella and Ernest Thomas from La Digue, St. Andrew Parish, Grenada. He was educated at the Holy Innocent Anglican Primary School; the St. Joseph Convent, Grenville, Grenada; Codrington College in Barbados, and the University of the West Indies, Cave Hill, Barbados. He was ordained to the Holy Order of Deacons on 29 June 1995 and to the Holy Order of Priests on 25 July 1996.

== Career ==
He has held the position of Chairman of the Conference of Churches Grenada, Chaplain to the Grenada Scouts Association, Director on the Board of the Grenada Cultural Foundation, Chairman of the Board of Directors of the Grenada Cultural Foundation, and District Disaster Management Coordinator for South East St. Georges Grenada. In this last position he made contributions to disaster management in Grenada and participated in meetings to formulate policies to govern disaster management there, such as during the passage of Hurricane Ivan and the years following.

He is the rector of St. Matthew's Anglican Parish, Biabou, St. Vincent; a canon in the Cathedral Church of St George, Diocese of the Windward Islands; and Archdeacon of St. Vincent and the Grenadines.

== Personal life ==
He is married to Claudia Wendine Thomas née Harewood from St. David's Village, Christ Church, Barbados. They have two children, Clyde Emmanuel Thomas and Christina Erica Thomas.
