= Larry Thomas =

Larry Thomas may refer to:

- Larry Thomas (actor) (born 1956), American actor best known for portraying "The Soup Nazi" on the NBC sitcom Seinfeld
- Larry Thomas (baseball) (born 1969), baseball player
- Larry D. Thomas (born 1947), Texas poet laureate
- Larry Thomas (racing driver) (1936–1965), NASCAR driver
- Larry Thomas (political advisor) (c. 1948–2018), American politician advisor

== See also ==
- Larry St. Thomas, American baseball player
- Lawrence Thomas (disambiguation)
