= René Thomas =

René Thomas may refer to:

- René Thomas (sport shooter) (1865–1925), French sport shooter
- René Thomas (racing driver) (1886–1975), French auto racer
- René Thomas (guitarist) (1927–1975), Belgian jazz guitarist
- René Thomas (biologist) (1928–2017), Belgian scientist
