= Aaron H. Thomas =

American rapist sentenced to life in prison

Aaron H. Thomas, also known as the East Coast Rapist, is an American who was convicted of committing a number of rapes in Maryland, Virginia, Connecticut and Rhode Island since 1997. Police had DNA evidence from the first attacks, but had not matched the DNA in any criminal database. On March 4, 2011, police in Connecticut arrested 39-year-old trucker and New Haven resident Thomas after claiming to have matched his DNA to that of the rapist from a cigarette butt he discarded. Thomas underwent police questioning. On March 5, 2011, jailers reported that Thomas attempted to hang himself while in a jail cell.

The rapist's modus operandi was to trail the women he selected as victims to learn about their personal lives and then attack them under cover of night. He usually approached the victim in an open area, talked to her briefly, and then forced her into a more secluded area to rape her. He used handguns, knives, a screwdriver, and a broken bottle as weapons during the attacks. On four occasions, he attacked more than one victim in the same incident.

On March 1, 2013, Thomas was sentenced to three life terms in prison plus an additional 80 years for his Halloween 2009 attack on three teenaged trick-or-treaters in Prince William County, Virginia, having pleaded guilty to said attack in November 2012. Later in March 2013, Thomas was sentenced to two additional life terms for a May 2001 rape and abduction at a Leesburg apartment complex, having pleaded guilty to said attack in November 2012. Later in March 2013, Thomas was indicted on six counts of first-degree rape and multiple related charges in Prince George's County, Maryland, and, as of March 26, 2013, faced a total of 54 charges in said county.

In June 2015, Thomas pleaded guilty to three rapes that took place in Prince George's County, Maryland, between 1997 and 2001 and received three more life terms that are to be served concurrently with time being served in Virginia. Prosecutors also dropped charges against Thomas in three cases because of a lack of evidence.

== Crimes ==
Date and time	Victim's race and age	Location	Weapon	Notes
January 5, 1997; 5:00 am	Black female; age 34	Forestville, MD	Handgun	No DNA evidence
February 19, 1997; 12:46 am	Black female; age 25	Forestville, MD	Handgun	DNA obtained
March 6, 1997; 4:00 am	Black female; age 27	Forestville, MD	Handgun	Two blocks from first attack; no DNA evidence
August 20, 1997; 12:45 am	Black female; age 18	Suitland, MD	Knife	DNA obtained
July 3, 1998; 11:00 pm	Black females; ages 16 and 18	Temple Hills, MD	Broken bottle	Only younger victim raped; DNA obtained
June 19, 1999; 11:17 pm	Black female; age 19	Hybla Valley, VA	Knife	DNA obtained
January 13, 2000; 7:30 pm	Black female; age 18	Hybla Valley, VA	Knife	DNA obtained
November 20, 2000; 6:00 pm	White female; age 35	Alexandria, VA	Knife	Victim fought back and was not raped; DNA obtained
May 24, 2001; 7:45 pm	White female; age 41	Leesburg, VA	Screwdriver	Victim was bound; DNA obtained
August 16, 2001; 10:00 pm	Black females; ages 18 and 19	Temple Hills, MD	Handgun	Both victims raped; DNA obtained
December 28, 2001; 7:30 pm	Black female; age 29	Hybla Valley, VA	Knife	Last rape for four years; DNA obtained
January 28, 2006; 2:21 am	Black female; age 46	New Haven, CT	None	Feces left behind; no DNA evidence
February 20, 2006; 3:45 am	Black female; age 17	New Haven, CT	None	Condom used; no DNA evidence
November 28, 2006; 5:22 pm	White females; ages 11 and 39	Cranston, RI	None	Dog scared rapist away before rape; feces left behind; DNA obtained
January 10, 2007; 1:21 am	Mixed-race female; age 27	New Haven, CT	None	DNA obtained
January 21, 2007; 6:10 am	Black female; age 33	New Haven, CT	None	Victim fought back and was not raped; no DNA evidence
October 31, 2009; 9:11 pm	Black females; ages 16, 17, and 17	Dale City, VA	Handgun	Youngest victim called police; rapist fled after attacking older victims; DNA obtained
