= Ralph Thomas (disambiguation) =

Ralph Thomas (1915–2001) was an English film director.

Ralph Thomas may also refer to:

- Ralph Thomas (American football) (1929–2024), American football player
- Ralph Thomas (Australian footballer) (born 1952), Australian footballer for Footscray
- Ralph W. Thomas (1862–1920), New York politician
- Ralph L. Thomas (1939–2026), Brazilian-born Canadian film director
- Ralph Thomas (activist) (born 1938), Canadian activist
- Ralph Thomas (diplomat), Jamaican banker, academic and diplomat
