= Bradley Thomas =

Bradley Thomas may refer to:

- Brad Thomas (baseball) (born 1977), Australian baseball player
- Brad Thomas (cricketer) (born 1972), Australian cricket player
- Bradley Thomas (athlete) (born 1967), Australian Paralympic athlete
- Brad Thomas (American politician) (born 1979), member of the Georgia House of Representatives
- Bradley Thomas (British politician), MP for Bromsgrove
- Bradley Thomas (producer) (born 1965), American film and television producer
- Bradley Thomas Batsford, British founder of Batsford Books
