= Aaron Thomas (cricketer) =

English cricketer

Personal information
- Full name: Aaron Courteney Thomas
- Born: 6 May 1985 (age 41); Edmonton, London, England
- Batting: Right-handed
- Role: Wicketkeeper

Domestic team information
- Years: Team
- 2003: Nottinghamshire
- 2001: Nottinghamshire Cricket Board

Career statistics
Competition	FC	LA
Matches	1	2
Runs scored	–	7
Batting average	–	–
100s/50s	–/–	–/–
Top score	–	7*
Balls bowled	–	–
Wickets	–	–
Bowling average	–	–
5 wickets in innings	–	–
10 wickets in match	–	–
Best bowling	–	–
Catches/stumpings	1/–	1/1
- Source: Cricinfo, 28 September 2010

Aaron Courteney Thomas (born 6 May 1985) is a former English cricketer. Thomas is a right-handed batsman who plays primarily as a wicketkeeper. He was born at Edmonton, London.

Thomas made his debut in List-A cricket for the Nottinghamshire Cricket Board against Bedfordshire in the 2001 Cheltenham & Gloucester Trophy at Wardown Park, Luton, with the Board losing by 3 wickets. His second and final List-A appearance for the Board came in 1st round of the 2002 Cheltenham & Gloucester Trophy against Oxfordshire at the Christ Church Ground, Oxford. This round of the competition was played in 2001, with the Board losing by 5 wickets. In his 2 List-A matches for the Board he batted in a single innings, scoring an unbeaten 7. Behind the stumps he took a single catch and made a single stumping.

Thomas made a single first-class appearance for Nottinghamshire against India in 2003. Not required to bat in the match, Thomas took a single catch behind the stumps.

In local cricket he currently represents the West Indian Cavaliers in the Nottinghamshire Cricket Board Premier League.
