= Cecil Thomas =

Cecil Thomas may refer to:

- Cecil Thomas (cricketer) (1926-1996), Guyanese cricketer
- Cecil Thomas (journalist) (1883–1960), British newspaper editor
- Cecil Thomas (politician) (born 1952), Ohio politician
- Cecil Thomas (sculptor) (1885–1976), British sculptor
- Cecil V. Thomas (1892–1947), American educator

== See also ==
- Thomas Cecil (disambiguation)
