= Calvin Thomas (critical theorist) =

American academic

Calvin Thomas is an American academic who works in the fields of critical theory, modern and postmodern literature and culture. He is a professor at Georgia State University. His writings have focused on gender, sexuality and the body, with an especial interest in "straight" responses to queer theory.

== Publications ==
- Thomas, Calvin (1998). Male Matters. Champaign: University of Illinois Press. ISBN 0-252-06500-X.
- Thomas, Calvin (2000). Straight with a Twist: Queer Theory and the Subject of Heterosexuality. Champaign: University of Illinois Press. ISBN 0-252-06813-0.
- Thomas, Calvin (2008). Masculinity, Psychoanalysis, Straight Queer Theory: Essays on Abjection in Literature, Mass Culture, and Film. New York: Palgrave/Macmillan. ISBN 0-230-60008-5.
- Thomas, Calvin (2013). Ten Lessons in Theory: An Introduction to Theoretical Writing. London: Bloomsbury Academic. ISBN 1623564026
