= Ray Thomas (disambiguation) =

Ray Thomas (1941–2018) was an English musician and a former member of The Moody Blues.

Ray Thomas may also refer to:

- Ray Thomas (Canadian politician) (1917–1985), Canadian judge and politician from Alberta
- Ray Thomas (Nebraska politician) (1883–1945), American politician from Nebraska
- Ray Thomas (rugby league), Australian rugby league footballer
- Ray Thomas (baseball) (1910–1993), American baseball player
- Ray Thomas (footballer, born 1926) (1926–1989), Australian footballer for Essendon and South Melbourne
- Ray Thomas (footballer, born 1940) (1940–2021), Australian footballer for Collingwood
- Ray B. Thomas (1884–1931), American college football coach for New Hampshire and Vermont

== See also ==
- Rae Thomas, fictional character in American soap opera Passions
- Raymond Thomas (disambiguation)
