= Malcolm Thomas =

Malcolm Thomas may refer to:

- Malcolm Thomas (basketball, born 1988), American professional basketball player
- Malcolm Thomas (basketball, born 1963), American college basketball player
- Malcolm Thomas (rugby union) (1929–2012), Welsh rugby player
- Malcolm Thomas or Mike Thomas (running back) (1953–2019), American football player
- Malcolm James Thomas or Malcolm Vaughn (1929–2010), Welsh singer and actor
