= Derek Thomas =

Derek Thomas may refer to:

- Derek Thomas (politician) (born 1972), British politician
- Derek Thomas (theologian) (born 1953), professor of theology
- Derek Thomas (basketball) (born 1966), college basketball coach

== See also ==
- Derrick Thomas (agricultural scientist) (1944–2013), British agricultural scientist
- Derrick Thomas (1967–2000), American football linebacker
