= Marcus Thomas =

Marcus Thomas may refer to:

- Marcus Thomas (defensive tackle) (born 1985), for the Denver Broncos
- Marcus Thomas (running back) (born 1984), free agent
- Marcus Thomas (actor), film actor
- Marcus Thomas (boxer) (born 1970)

== See also ==
- Marc Thomas (disambiguation)
