= Roger Thomas =

Roger Thomas may refer to:

- Roger Thomas (footballer) (born 1973), Jamaican footballer
- Roger Thomas (American football coach) (born 1947), American football coach
- Roger Thomas (British politician) (1925–1994), British Labour Party politician
- Roger Thomas (Iowa politician) (born 1950), Iowa State Representative
- Roger Thomas (Kentucky politician), Kentucky State Representative
- Roger C. Thomas (1939–2024), British physiologist
- Roger Thomas (diplomat), former British Ambassador to Azerbaijan
- Roger J. Thomas (1942–2015), solar physicist
- Roger Thomas (designer) (born 1951), American interior designer
- Roger "Raj" Thomas, fictional character on the U.S. TV series What's Happening!! and What's Happening Now!!
