= Joel Thomas =

Joel Thomas may refer to:

- Joel Thomas (swimmer) (born 1966), American Olympic swimmer in the 1992 Games
- Joël Thomas (born 1987), French footballer
- Joel Thomas (artist), American fantasy artist
- Joel Thomas (American football) (born 1974), American football coach
