= Zach Thomas (disambiguation) =

Zach Thomas (born 1973) is an American former gridiron football player who played as a linebacker.

Zach, Zack, or Zachary Thomas may also refer to:

- Zach Thomas (basketball) (born 1996), American basketball player
- Zach Thomas (wide receiver) (born 1960), American former gridiron football player
- Zachary Thomas (offensive lineman) (born 1998), American football player
- Zack Thomas, a fictional character in the 1963 movie 4 for Texas

== See also ==
- Zachary Thompson (disambiguation)
