= Kevin Thomas (cricketer) =

English cricketer

Personal information
- Full name: Kevin Oliver Thomas
- Born: 20 June 1963 (age 63); Mile End, London, England
- Batting: Right-handed
- Bowling: Right-arm fast-medium

Domestic team information
- Years: Team
- 1991–1992: Cambridgeshire
- 1990: Essex

Career statistics
Competition	First-class	List A
Matches	1	1
Runs scored	2	2
Batting average	2.00	2.00
100s/50s	0/0	0/0
Top score	2	2
Balls bowled	110	24
Wickets	0	0
Bowling average	–	–
5 wickets in innings	0	0
10 wickets in match	0	–
Best bowling	–	–
Catches/stumpings	0/–	0/–
- Source: Cricinfo, 27 November 2010

Kevin Oliver Thomas (born 20 June 1963) is a former English cricketer. Thomas was a right-handed batsman who bowled right-arm fast-medium. He was born in Mile End, London.

== Career ==
Thomas made his one and only first-class appearance for Essex in 1989 against the touring New Zealanders.

The following season, Thomas joined Cambridgeshire. During that season he made his only List A appearance in that format against Kent in the 1991 NatWest Trophy.

It was during the 1991 season that he made his Minor Counties Championship debut against Norfolk. From 1991 to 1992, he represented the county in 3 Championship matches, the last of which came against Suffolk. He made a single MCCA Knockout Trophy appearance against Norfolk in 1991.
