= Norman Thomas (disambiguation) =

Norman Thomas may refer to:

- Norman Thomas (1884–1968), American socialist, pacifist and presidential candidate for the Socialist Party of America
- Norman G. Thomas (1930–2020), American astronomer
- Norman Thomas (Australian politician) (1894–?), New South Wales politician
- Norman Thomas (broadcaster) (1947/8–2011), British radio personality
