= Geoffrey Thomas =

Geoff or Geoffrey Thomas may refer to:

- Geoffrey Thomas (academic) (born 1941), president of Kellogg College, Oxford
- Geoffrey Thomas (businessman) (born 1959), Australian businessman
- Geoff Thomas (footballer, born 1948) (1948–2013), Welsh football player (Swansea City)
- Geoff Thomas (footballer, born 1964), English international football player (Crystal Palace)
- Geoff Thomas (pastor) (born 1938), Welsh pastor
- Geoff Thomas (tennis), Australian tennis player

== See also ==
- Jeffrey Thomas (disambiguation)
