= Timothy Thomas =

Timothy, Tim, or Timmy Thomas may refer to:

- Timothy Thomas (record producer), part of duo R. City with his brother Theron Thomas
- Timothy Thomas, an unarmed African American man shot and killed by a Cincinnati Police Department patrolman sparking the Cincinnati riots of 2001
- Tim Thomas (athlete) (born 1973), Welsh pole vaulter
- Tim Thomas (basketball) (born 1977), American professional basketball player
- Tim Thomas (ice hockey, born 1963), American ice hockey defenseman
- Tim Thomas (ice hockey, born 1974), American professional ice hockey goaltender
- Tim Thomas (kickboxer) (born 1983), Muay Thai kickboxer
- Timmy Thomas (1944–2022), American R&B singer

== Fictional characters ==
- Reverend Tim Tom, a character from the TV sitcom The Middle
- Timothy Thomas Turner or Timmy Turner, a main character in The Fairly OddParents

== See also ==
- Timothy Thomas Fortune (1856–1928), American orator, civil rights leader, journalist, writer, editor and publisher
- Timothy Thomas Ryan (born 1968), American football offensive lineman
