= Hilah Thomas =

American medical science writer

- Born: Hilah Frances Bryan; November 27, 1909; Charlottesville, Virginia, U.S.
- Died: March 14, 2009 (aged 99)
- Education: Smith College; University of Virginia
- Children: 4
- Scientific career
- Fields: Pharmacology, medical writing
- Workplaces: Sweet Briar College; National Institutes of Health

Hilah Bryan Thomas (November 27, 1909 – March 14, 2009) was an American medical science writer who worked at the National Institutes of Health for 22 years. She was an elected fellow of the American Medical Writers Association.

== Life ==
Hilah Frances Bryan was born November 27, 1909, in Charlottesville, Virginia, to Henrietta Kemp White and William Minor Bryan. She spent most of her childhood on east coast U.S. Public Health Service reservations. Her father was a public health doctor who worked on U.S. Marine hospitals. Thomas' aunt taught her how to swim at the age of five while she was living in Mobile, Alabama. She graduated from Smith College in 1931. Thomas completed a M.A. in biology from the University of Virginia in 1932 and then became a research assistant in pharmacology with a Baltimore pharmaceutical company.

Thomas held positions as a secretary with the Miller School of Biology at the University of Virginia and laboratory instructor at Sweet Briar College. At Sweet Briar, she was replaced by Martha Clark in 1939. She married lawyer Llewellyn C. Thomas on August 12, 1939, in Charlottesville, Virginia. They had four children, including, Hilah Frances Thomas, Elizabeth Mayer, Ellen Thomas, and Merrick Thomas. She put her career on pause to become a housewife and mother. After her four children went away to school, she became a civil servant. Thomas worked for the National Institutes of Health (NIH) division of research and National Institute of General Medical Sciences for six years. In 1966, Thomas became a medical science writer in the office of scientific and health reports in the National Institute of Dental Research (NIDR). In 1980, she was elected an active fellow of the American Medical Writers Association in recognition of her professional achievements and her contributions to the goals and activities of the association. She retired June 30, 1983, with 22 years of Federal service.

Through 1999, she swam daily as a form of exercise. She died March 14, 2009.
