= Alfred Thomas (footballer) =

English footballer

Personal information
- Date of birth: 1895
- Place of birth: Hetton-le-Hole, England
- Height: 5 ft 9 in (1.75 m)
- Position: Outside right

Senior career*
Years	Team	Apps	(Gls)
- Llanelli
- Houghton Main Colliery
1921–1923	Bradford City	14	(1)
1923	Merthyr Town		
1923–1925	Hull City	36	(4)
- South Shields
- Ashington
- Hetton United
Total		50	(5)
- * Club domestic league appearances and goals

Alfred Thomas (born 1895) was an English footballer who played as an outside right.

== Career ==
Born in Hetton-le-Hole, Thomas spent his early career with Llanelli and Houghton Main Colliery. He joined Bradford City in November 1921, making 14 league appearances for the club, before moving to Merthyr Town in February 1923. He later played for Hull City, South Shields, Ashington and Hetton United.

== Sources ==
- Frost, Terry (1988). Bradford City A Complete Record 1903-1988. Breedon Books Sport. ISBN 0-907969-38-0.
