= Patricia Thompson =

Patricia Thompson may refer to:

- Patricia Thompson (producer) (1947–2010), American television producer and documentary filmmaker
- Patricia Thompson (writer) (1926–2016), American philosopher and author
- Patricia Thompson (businesswoman) (born 1940), British businesswoman
- Patty Thompson (swimmer) (Patricia E. Thompson, born 1945), Canadian freestyle swimmer

== See also ==
- Patricia Thomson (1937–2024), Australian cricketer
- Pat Thomson (1940–1992), English-born Australian actress
