= Ronald Thomas =

Ronald Thomas is the name of:

- Ronald Thomas (politician) (1929–2020), British Labour Party politician
- Ronald Thomas (cellist) (born 1954), American cellist
- R. S. Thomas (1913–2000), Welsh poet and Anglican clergyman
- Ronald Thomas (tennis) (1888–1936), Australian Olympic tennis player
- Ronald Thomas (cricketer) (1915–1987), Australian cricketer
- Ronald R. Thomas (1949–2023), American academic administrator

== See also ==
- Ron Thomas (disambiguation)
- Ronnie Thomas (born 1955), NASCAR driver
