= Thomas Vernon (engraver) =

British engraver

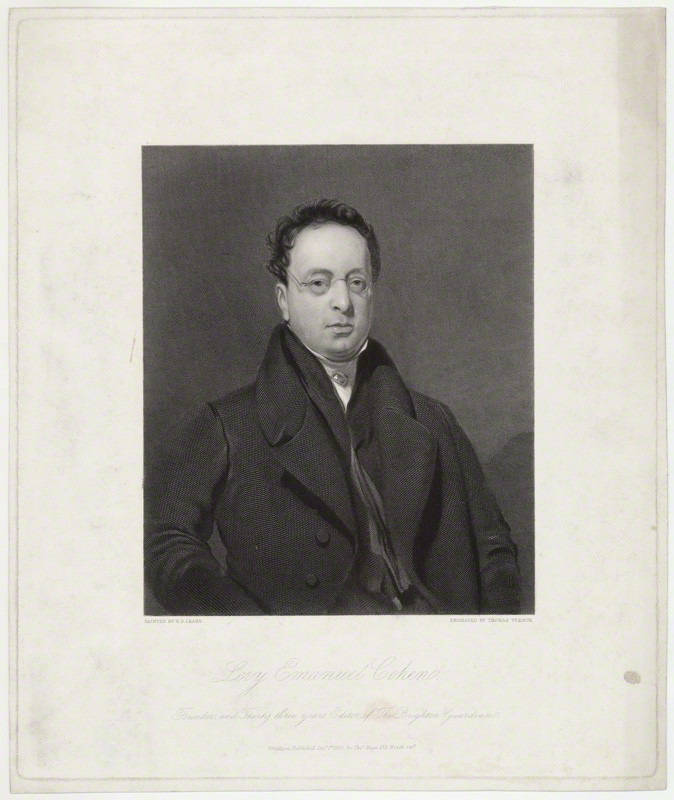
Levy Emanuel Cohen by Thomas Vernon, after Edward Daniel Leahy.

Thomas Vernon (1824? – 28 February 1872) was a British engraver.

Vernon was born in Staffordshire about 1824, and studied first in Paris and later in England, where he was a pupil of Peter Lightfoot. He worked in pure line, and became one of the best engravers of figure subjects of his day.

Vernon engraved for Samuel Carter Hall's "Royal Gallery of Art, Ancient and Modern": Dyce's Virgin Mother, Winterhalter's portrait of Princess Helena as an amazon, and two other plates. He also engraved several for The Art Journal. Vernon's last and most important work was Christ healing the Paralytic, from the picture by Murillo belonging at that time to Colonel Tomine, M.P. who presented the plate to the Newspaper Press Fund. Veron died on 28 January 1872.
