= Edwin Thomas (novelist) =

English historical novelist

Edwin Thomas (born 1977) is an English historical novelist. He was born in 1977 in Frankfurt, West Germany, and grew up in Belgium and Connecticut, United States. He studied history at Lincoln College, Oxford, where he also worked in the theatre. He now lives in York with his wife and son.

== Biography ==
After three years working at a local actuarial firm to pay the bills, he decided to start working part-time and focus on writing, He saw an advert for the Debut Dagger competition. He entered it with the first chapter of what became The Blighted Cliffs and finished runner-up. Eventually, he found an agent and a publisher.

He writes naval historical novels about Napoleon wars centred on the eponymous Lieutenant Martin Jerrold. His other series, written under the pseudonym Tom Harper, is centred on the First Crusade. His novel The Book of Secrets interweaves a present-day mystery with a historical account of the inventor of the printing press, Johannes Gutenberg and the artist known as the Master of the Playing Cards.

Thomas is chair of the South Bank multi-academy trust of schools.

== Reluctant Adventures of Lieutenant Martin Jerrold ==
1. The Blighted Cliffs (2003) (runner-up of the 2001 Crime Writers' Association "Debut Dagger" Award)
2. Chains of Albion (2004)
3. Treason's River (2006)

== As Tom Harper ==
=== Crusade series ===
1. The Mosaic of Shadows (2004)
2. Knights of the Cross (2005)
3. Siege of Heaven (2006)

=== Courtney ===
(A series by Wilbur Smith; books with Wilbur Smith)

- 15. The Tiger's Prey (2017)
- 17. Ghost Fire (2019)
- 19. Storm Tide (2022)

=== Others ===
- The Lost Temple (2007)
- The Book of Secrets (2009)
- The Lazarus Vault (2010)
- Secrets of the Dead (2012)
- The Orpheus Descent (2013)
- Zodiac Station (2015)
- Black River (2015)
