= Keshia Thomas =

African-American woman who saved a then Ku Klux Klan member from being lynched

Keshia Thomas (born c. 1978) is an African-American woman and human rights activist known for a 1996 event at which she was photographed protecting a man believed to have been a Ku Klux Klan supporter. The resulting photograph, which was taken by Mark Brunner, has been considered to be iconic in nature and was named one of Life magazine's "Pictures of the Year" for 1996.

== Rally ==
In June 1996 a branch of the Ku Klux Klan announced plans to hold a rally in Ann Arbor, Michigan. In response, several people in the Ann Arbor area planned to hold a protest against the Ku Klux Klan's presence on the day of the rally. Thomas was one of several people that attended and protested from an area that had been fenced and set aside for the protesters.

The protest proceeded until one protester announced over a megaphone that there was "a Klansman in the crowd". The unnamed man was a middle-aged white male wearing a T-shirt depicting the Confederate flag and an "SS tattoo". The man began to run but was knocked down, kicked, and beaten with placards.

Thomas, who was at that time 18 years old, shielded the man from the crowd and shouted for the attackers to stop and is credited as saying that you "can't beat goodness into a person". Shortly after that point the police arrived on the scene.

A news report stated that seven anti-Klansmen protesters were arrested at the event and a large group of protesters were tear gassed after they attempted to enter the police station where fifteen Klansmen were being kept for their safety.

== Aftermath ==
After the rally Thomas was praised for her actions by Senator Ernest Hollings and a reporter for The Day commented that while the man was "wrong for the views he sanctioned", the protesters were also in the wrong "in their violence against him". Thomas also received praise and attention from multiple media outlets, including People and the National Enquirer, the latter of which wanted to give her a hero award. Joseph H. Brown of The Tampa Tribune compared Thomas favorably to Martin Luther King Jr. and called her "a modern-day profile in courage." For her acts, Thomas received the Congress of Racial Equality's Harmony Award in August 1996.

The Ann Arbor Police considered pursuing charges of resisting and obstructing police against Thomas, stating that she had shoved a deputy who was in the process of assisting a fellow deputy who was being assaulted by a protestor, Jana Cephas. Thomas was maced, and in a statement to the Ann Arbor City Council, she questioned why the mace was used, as she had been attempting to assist two teens who were knocked down during the rally. Cephas was charged with assault, charges that were later dismissed. This prevented prosecutors from pursuing charges against Thomas.

Thomas expressed that she had protected the man due to her own religious convictions and because she "knew what it was like to be hurt ... The many times that that happened, I wish someone would have stood up for me." A few months after the June event, Thomas was thanked by the son of the unnamed man she rescued.

Since the event, Thomas has gone on to become a human rights activist, and in 2016, noted that, "The real accomplishment of all this to me is to know that his son and daughter don't share the same views. History didn't repeat itself. That's what gives me hope that the world can get better from generation to generation."
