= Adam Thomas (disambiguation) =

Adam Thomas (born 1988) is an English actor.

Adam Thomas may also refer to:

- Adam Thomas (rugby union) (born 1986), Welsh rugby union player
- Adam Thomas (footballer) (born 1992), New Zealand footballer
- Adam Thomas (cricketer) (born 2006), English cricket player
- Adam Thomas (politician), American politician in Kansas
