= Trevor Thomas =

Trevor Thomas may refer to:

- Trevor Thomas (actor), British actor
- Trevor Thomas (athlete), in Athletics at the 1966 Central American and Caribbean Games
- Trevor Thomas (art historian), (1907–1993), British art historian and curator
- Trevor Thomas (hiker), American blind hiker
- Trevor Thomas (historian) (1934–2020), British historian at the School of Slavonic and East European Studies
- Trevor Thomas (rugby) (1907–1969), rugby union, and rugby league footballer of the 1930s and 1940s
- Trevor Thomas (Colonel), Antiguan Chief of Defence
