= Gareth Thomas =

Gareth Thomas may refer to:

- Gareth Thomas (materials scientist) (1932–2014), American electron microscopist, professor at the University of California, Berkeley
- Gareth Thomas (actor) (1945–2016), Welsh actor
- Gareth Thomas (Welsh Labour politician) (born 1954), former member of parliament for the Clwyd West constituency
- Gaz Thomas, member of the Senedd in Wales
- Gareth Thomas (English politician) (born 1967), member of parliament for Harrow West
- Gareth Thomas (rugby, born 1974), Welsh rugby union and rugby league footballer
- Gareth Thomas (rugby union, born 1993), Welsh rugby union footballer for the Ospreys

== See also ==
- Gary Thomas (disambiguation)
