= Edwin Lorimer Thomas =

American Professor of Engineering

Edwin Lorimer Thomas is a research professor in the Materials Science and Engineering department at the University of Virginia. Previously he worked at Texas A&M, Rice, MIT, UMassachusetts and the University of Minnesota. He was elected to the National Academy of Engineering and to the American Academy of Arts and Sciences. He served as department head in the Polymer Science and Engineering department at UMassachusetts. At MIT he was the founding director of the Institute for Soldier Nanotechnology and served as deparment head in Materials Science and Engineering. At Rice, Thomas as the Ernest Dell Butcher Professor of Engineering and William and Stephanie Sick Dean of the George R. Brown School of Engineering from 2011 to 2017.

Thomas earned a B.S. in mechanical engineering from the University of Massachusetts Amherst in 1969 and a Ph.D. in materials science and engineering from Cornell University in 1974. Thomas was awarded the status of Fellow in the American Physical Society, after they were nominated by their Division of Polymer Physics in 1985, for being a leading authority on the application of electron microscopy and scattering techniques to problems in polymer structure-property relations and for contributions on mosaic block structure of semicrystalline polymers as well as on the structure of the noncrystalline solid state of glassy polymers.

== See also ==
- List of fellows of the American Physical Society (1972–1997)
- Members of the National Academy of Engineering, USA
