= Vernon Thomas (artist) =

American artist (1894–1962)

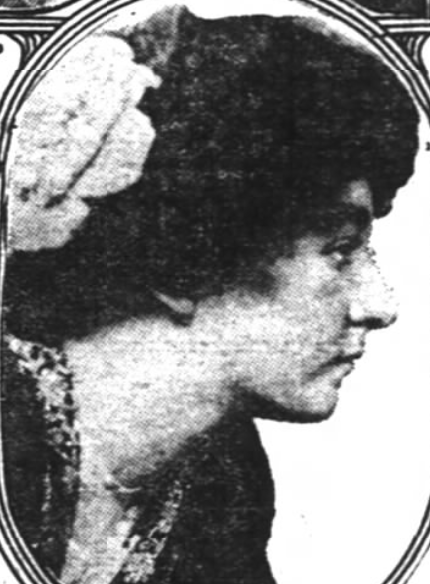
- Vernon Thomas, from a 1910 newspaper
- Born: Vernon Thomas; September 12, 1894; Evanston, Illinois, U.S.
- Died: April 4, 1962 (aged 67); Hartford, Connecticut, U.S.
- Other names: Vernon Thomas Rudd, Vernon Thomas Leigh
- Occupations: Artist, illustrator

Vernon H. Thomas Kirkbride Rudd Leigh (September 12, 1894 – April 4, 1962) was an American artist, known professionally as Vernon Thomas after 1928. She specialized in portraits of children. Her works were exhibited internationally, and appeared on magazine covers in the 1920s and 1930s.

== Early life and education ==
Vernon Thomas was born in Evanston, Illinois, the daughter of Herbert Alden Thomas and Evelyn Seavey Thomas. Her brother Rodney S. Thomas was an international traveler and businessman. She graduated from the Art Institute of Chicago, where she studied with Charles Webster Hawthorne. While at the Art Institute, she performed in a Shakespeare-themed student production.

== Career ==
Vernon Thomas made prints, watercolors, pastels, and oil paintings, mostly portraits of children, or illustrations of children at play. Her art appeared on the covers of magazines including The Woman Citizen in 1926. She created more than a dozen Good Housekeeping covers between 1934 and 1936. She was a member of the Chicago Society of Etchers, and exhibited her works in Chicago, Washington, D.C., Los Angeles, and internationally. While in Chicago she worked with fellow printmaker Bertha Jaques. In 1928, she won the Mrs. Julius Rosenwald Purchase Prize at the Art Institute of Chicago exhibition, for "Cut-outs".

== Personal life and legacy ==
Thomas married three times. She married fellow artist Earle Rosslyn Kirkbride in 1918. The Kirkbrides divorced in the late 1920s. She married Spencer T. Rudd soon after; he died by suicide in 1932. She moved to New York City, and married her third husband, publisher Maurice Chaffee Leigh, in 1945; he died in 1955. She died in 1962, in Hartford, Connecticut, in her late seventies. Her works are held by museums including the Smithsonian American Art Museum and the Nelson-Atkins Museum of Art.
