= Alexandrios Thomas =

Indian priest (born 1971)

His Grace Mor Alexandrios Thomas Metropolitan of Ireland Diocese
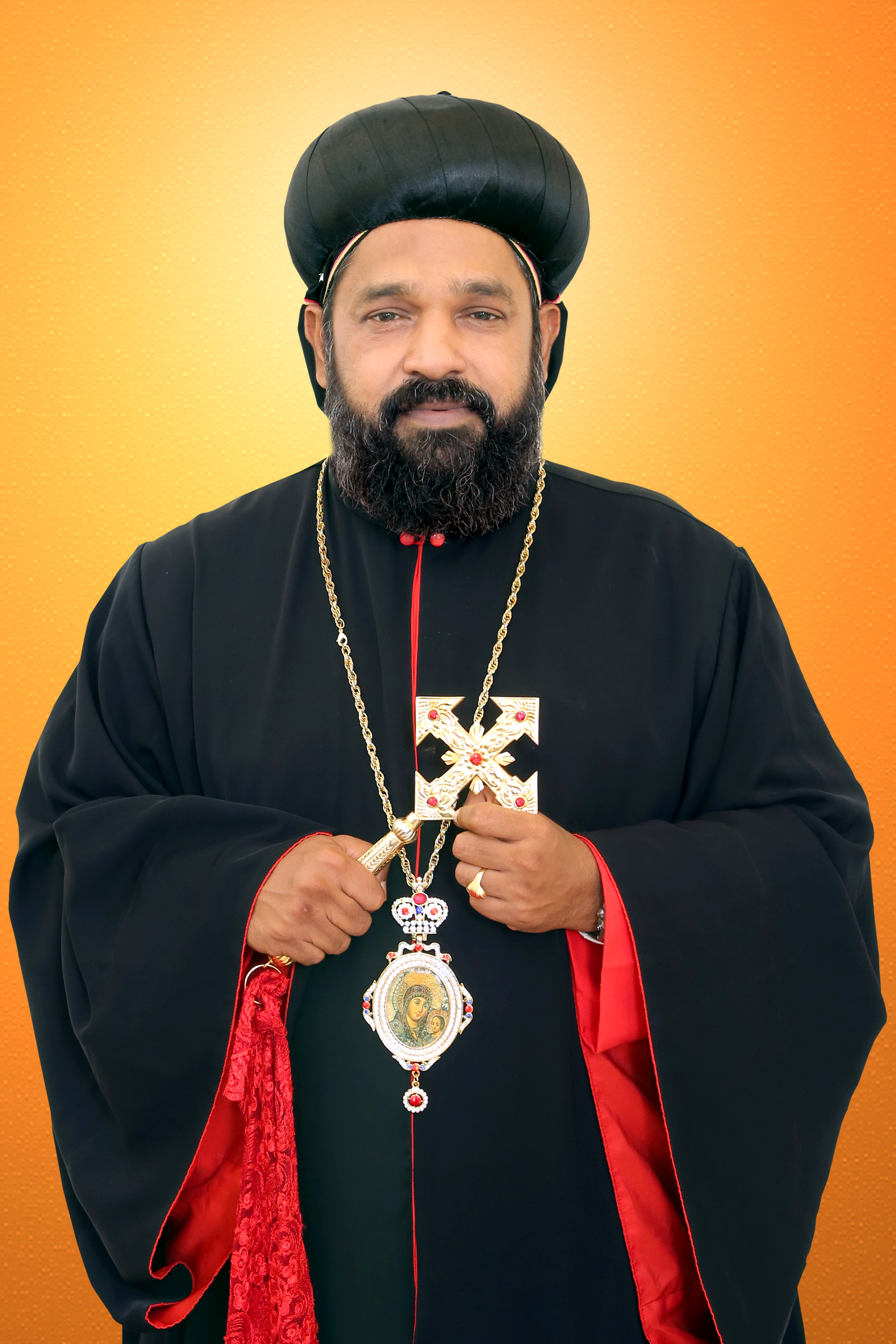
- Mor Alexandrios Thomas Metropolitan
- Church: Syriac Orthodox Church
- Diocese: Metropolitan of Ireland Diocese of the Syriac Orthodox Church
- See: Holy Apostolic See of Antioch & All East

Orders
- Ordination: 15 May 2004 (Kassisso) by Thomas Mor Timotheos
- Consecration: 2 January 2012 by Baselios Thomas I
- Rank: Metropolitan

Personal details
- Born: 9 July 1971 Kottayam
- Parents: Late Fr. N. M. Abraham, Neriyanthara & Mrs. Elizabeth Abraham
- Education: M.Div (Master of Divinity, Beracah Bible College & Seminary, Thiruvallur), B.Th from Presbyterian Theological Seminary, Dehradun, B.Com M.G University, Diploma in Philosophy, Theological Studies M.S.O.T. Seminary
- Alma mater: M.G University

Mor Alexandrios Thomas, formerly Thomas Abraham Neriyanthara, is the Metropolitan of Ireland Diocese of Malankara Jacobite Syriac Orthodox Church. A popular priest in the state, he was ordained in 2004 and consecrated in 2012 by Baselios Thomas I.

== Biography ==
Thomas Abraham Neriyanthara was born in Panampady, Kottayam, Kerala in 1971 as son of Fr. N. M. Abraham and Mrs. Elizabeth Abraham. He was baptized at St. Mary's Jacobite Syrian Orthodox Church Panampady, Kottayam his home parish.

== Theological studies ==
After his graduation, he joined the Presbyterian Theological Seminary, Dehradun for his Theological studies. He completed his B.Th. (Bachelor of Theology) Post which he completed Master of Divinity from Beracah Bible College & Seminary, Thiruvallur. He also holds a diploma in Philosophy from Mor Aphrem Seminary, Vadavathoor, Kottayam, Kerala

== Ordination ==
Thomas Abraham Neriyanthara was ordained as a deacon on 15 March 1997, by Joseph Mor Gregorios and as a priest on 15 May 2004, by Thomas Mor Themotheos. After his ordination as priest he served as vicar in St. Peter's J.S.O Church, Chicago, USA and St. Mary's JSO Church, Vellore, Tamil Nadu. He was elevated to the position of Metropolitan (Bishop) as Thomas Mor Alexandrios on 2 January 2012 at the Puthencuriz St. Athanasious Cathedral by Baselios Thomas I.

== Other positions ==
He is the founder and director of Santhwana Guidance & Counselling Centre at Vellore, Tamil Nadu. The centre was consecrated by Baselios Thomas I on 24 March 2012.

The synod of the Jacobite Church made him metropolitan of their Mumbai diocese on 13 June 2013.
