= Kurt Thomas =

Kurt Thomas may refer to:

- Kurt Thomas (composer) (1904–1973), German composer, conductor, and music educator
- Kurt Thomas (gymnast) (1956–2020), American gymnast
- Kurt Thomas (basketball) (born 1972), American basketball player
- Kurt Thomas (general) (1896–1943), German general during World War II

== See also ==
- Curtis Thomas, American politician
- Kurt St. Thomas (born 1963), American filmmaker, author, and disc jockey
