= Harvey Thomas (luthier) =

American luthier

Harvey Thomas was an American luthier who built a number of distinctive guitars in the 1960s.

Thomas was based in Kent, Washington, where he built guitars apparently uninfluenced by any other guitar builder. It included a cross-shaped guitar (called the Maltese), a triangular one (the Mandarin), and "the deranged mutations of the Mod and the Riot King." Thomas custom-built guitars as well, both electric and acoustic, including a number of enormous hollow-body guitars.
