= Keith Thomas =

Keith Thomas may refer to:

- Keith Thomas (footballer, born 1961) (born 1961), Australian rules footballer
- Keith Thomas (footballer, born 1929) (1929–2017), Australian rules footballer
- Keith Thomas (English footballer) (1929–2021), English footballer
- Keith Thomas (historian) (born 1933), Welsh historian
- Keith Thomas (record producer), American record producer and songwriter
- Keith Thomas (saxophonist), British saxophonist, writer and producer
- Keith Thomas (sailor) (born 1956), sailor who competed for the British Virgin Islands
- Keith Thomas (director), American film director and screenwriter
