= Tony Thomas =

Tony Thomas may refer to:

- Tony Thomas (film historian) (1927–1997)
- Tony Thomas (footballer) (born 1971), English footballer with Tranmere Rovers, Everton and Motherwell
- Tony Thomas (guitarist) (1959–2022, aka Tony "Strat" Thomas), American funk and blues guitarist
- Anthony William Thomas (born 1949), known as Tony, professor of physics at the University of Adelaide
- Tony Thomas (producer) (born 1948), American television and film producer
- Tony Thomas (rugby league), rugby league footballer of the 1960s and 1970s
- Tony Thomas (baseball) (born 1986), American baseball player
- Raymond A. Thomas (born 1958, also known as Tony Thomas), American general

== See also ==
- Anthony Thomas (disambiguation)
- Antonio Thomas (disambiguation)
