= Antonio Thomas =

Antonio Thomas may refer to:

- Antonio Thomas (cricketer) (born 1982), Barbadian cricketer
- Antonio Thomas (wrestler), stage name of professional wrestler Tom Matera
- J. Antonio Thomas, Canadian politician
- Antonio Thomás, 16th-century Portuguese marine and conquistador

== See also ==
- Tony Thomas (disambiguation)
