= Edgar Thomas (cricketer) =

English cricketer

Personal information
- Born: 2 November 1875; Bristol
- Died: 20 March 1936 (aged 60); Hammersmith, London
- Batting: Right-handed

Domestic team information
- Years: Team
- 1895-1907: Gloucestershire
- Source: Cricinfo, 30 March 2014

Edgar Thomas (2 November 1875 – 20 March 1936) was an English cricketer. He played for Gloucestershire between 1895 and 1907.
