= Edgar Thomas (footballer) =

Welsh footballer

Personal information
- Full name: Daniel Edgar Thomas
- Date of birth: 1895
- Height: 5 ft 8 in (1.73 m)
- Position: Midfielder

Senior career*
Years	Team	Apps	(Gls)
–1923	Cardiff Albion		
1923–1924	Cardiff Camerons		
1925–192?	Cardiff Corinthians		
192?–1928	Cardiff City		
1928–1929	Cardiff Corinthians		
1929–193?	Lovell's Athletic		
193?–1934	Oswestry Town		
193?–193?	Llanerch Celts		

International career
1923–1934	Wales Amateur	12	(0)
1925	Wales	1	(0)
- * Club domestic league appearances and goals

Daniel Edgar Thomas (born 1895; date of death unknown), commonly known as Edgar Thomas, was a Welsh footballer who played as a midfielder and made one appearance for the Wales national team.

== Career ==
Thomas made his first and only international appearance for Wales on 28 February 1925 in the 1924–25 British Home Championship against England. The home match, which was played in Swansea, finished as a 1–2 loss for Wales. He also made twelve appearances for the Welsh amateur team between 1923 and 1934.

== Career statistics ==
=== International ===
Wales
Year	Apps	Goals
1925	1	0
Total	1	0
