= Rosemary Thomas =

American poet

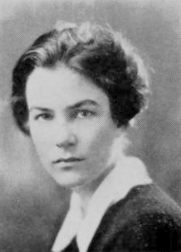
- In the Smith College yearbook, 1923
- Born: February 16, 1901
- Died: April 7, 1961 (aged 60); New York, New York, US
- Education: Smith College; Columbia University
- Occupations: Poet, teacher

Rosemary Thomas (February 16, 1901 – April 7, 1961) was an American poet and teacher, known for her book of poems Immediate Sun, which won the Twayne First Book Contest in 1951.

== Education ==
Thomas graduated from Smith College in 1923. In 1950, she received a Master of Arts degree from Columbia University for an essay on Lawrence Durrell, the British poet and novelist.

She taught creative writing at various schools including Spence School and Brearley School in New York, Shipley School in Bryn Mawr, Pennsylvania and Oxford School in Hartford, Connecticut.

== Literary career ==
In 1951, Thomas won the Twayne First Book Contest for her only book of poems, Immediate Sun. The book had a foreword written by Archibald MacLeish, who described her poems as having "a common quality, a characteristic idiom, and inflection the reader would recognize again as a man recognizes the inflection of a decisive voice". The book includes a poem about her brother-in-law, Canadian tennis star J.F. Foulkes, entitled "The Colonel".

A review in the Chicago Tribune described Thomas's poetry as "serene, pleasant lyrics written by a young woman whose compassion is happily tempered by a graceful wit"; while the reviewer felt the book was not consistent in quality throughout, he concluded she had a "modest but genuine talent". A reviewer in the St Louis Post-Dispatch praised her "impressive demonstration of modern verse technique" and descriptive language, although felt that her poems were "[m]ore fashionable than original".

Thomas's poems were also published in the New York Times, The New Yorker, and in other magazines. The final years of her life, which she devoted entirely to her writing, were divided between her homes in Duxbury, Massachusetts, and New York City, where she died in 1961.

== Legacy ==
A posthumous collection of her poems was published in 1968, titled Selected Poems of Rosemary Thomas, with a foreword by Mark van Doren. He wrote: "Rosemary Thomas's poems will last, as all things excellent do, for the simple reason that nothing like them exists elsewhere."

In 2004, her poem "The Elephants Pass Carnegie Hall" was set to music by composer David Leisner in his piece A Timeless Procession. It was first performed in 2011 at Symphony Space in New York City. The program for the performance records that Leisner discovered Thomas's poems by chance at a library book sale in the late 1980s. He describes her as a "lyrical, imaginative, spiritual-minded poet whose work simply begged me to set it to music".

The English Language and Literature Department at Smith College awards the Rosemary Thomas Poetry Prize annually to the best poem or group of poems.
