= Vernon Thomas =

Vernon Thomas (born 1935) is a Kolkata-based Anglo Indian author. He is the author of 119 books, novels and retold stories for children, teenagers and young adults. While most of his books have been brought out by Pauline Publications, as many as 250 short stories of his have been published in journals in India, Italy, the UK and South Africa. Thomas lost his eyesight in 1994 as a result of two faulty cataract operations and continues to write.

== Honors and awards ==
The Kolkata Archdiocese conferred the Life Time Achievement Award on Vernon Thomas, emulating a similar award bestowed on the veteran writer by the SARNEWS agency. The award consists of a citation and an exquisitely made wooden book, which opens up to an acrylic page where the dedication is engraved.

Thomas has been featured in Men Of Achievement and The International Who’s Who of World Authors published by the Biographical Centre of Cambridge, England. A Commerce graduate, Thomas did a postal course in the art of storytelling from the Regent Institute of London. He has a fan club based in Howrah, managed by Argha Mukherjee.

== Bibliography ==
=== Original Fiction ===
- The Mystery of the Secret Package
- The Mystery of the Strange Look Alike
- Mystery at St. Anne's Home
- Mystery at St. Lucy's
- Mystery of the Strange Legacy
- Mystery of the Elusive Thief
- Secret of the Haunted House
- The Mummy’s Little Man
- Bobby Blues
- Aunt Agatha's Cataract Days
- Just Grandma and Other Humorous Stories
- Roses for Remembrance
- Tomorrow May Be Too Late and Other Stories
- The Mystery at Lime Tree House

=== Retold Stories ===
- Famous Old Fairy Tales
- Legends from Northern India
- Fairy Tales from India
- Folk Tales from India
- Bedtime Stories from India
- More stories from the Arabian nights
