= Marc Thomas (computer scientist) =

American computer scientist

Marc Phillip Thomas (1949–2017) was a professor of computer science and mathematics, retired chair and a system administrator of Computer Science department at CSU Bakersfield. He obtained a Ph.D. in mathematics from UC Berkeley in 1976.

His successful research projects include the resolution of the commutative Singer–Wermer conjecture and construction of a non-standard closed ideal in a certain radical Banach algebra of power series and their quotients.

== Exposition ==
- The Relationship between C, ANSI C, and C++
- "The Unix Operating System". Archived from the original on October 5, 2002. (from Encyclopedia of Information Systems)
- "The PC Organism". Archived from the original on April 28, 1997.
- "OS/2 FAQ". Archived from the original on April 28, 1997.
- Remarks on Network Security
- Typical Hacking Attempts
- Typical Buffer Overflow Hack Attempts
- Moronic Hacking
- Efficient Hacking

== Publications ==
- Elements in the radical of a Banach algebra obeying the unbounded Kleinecke-Shirokov conjecture
- Marc P. Thomas (Jan 2003). "Local power series quotients of commutative Banach and Fréchet algebras". Trans. Amer. Math. Soc. 355 (5): 2139–2160. doi:10.1090/S0002-9947-03-03251-3.
- Prime-like Elements and Semi-direct Products in Commutative Banach Algebras
- Marc P. Thomas (1983). "Closed Ideals of l^{1}({ω_{n}}) when {ω_{n}} is Star-Shaped". Pacific Journal of Mathematics. 105 (1): 237–255. doi:10.2140/pjm.1983.105.237.
- Principal Ideals and Semi-direct Products in Commutative Banach Algebras
- Single-Element Properties in Commutative Radical Banach Algebras:a Classification Scheme
- Reduction of discontinuity for derivations on Frechet algebras
- Radical Banach Algebrasand Quasinilpotent Weighted Shift Operators.
- The image of a derivation is contained in the radical (MR970607)
- Marc P. Thomas (1993). "Primitive Ideals and Derivations on Non-Commutative Banach Algebras". Pacific Journal of Mathematics. 159 (1): 139–152. doi:10.2140/pjm.1993.159.139.
- Marc P. Thomas (1978). "Algebra Homomorphisms and the Functional Calculus". Pacific Journal of Mathematics. 79 (1): 251–269. doi:10.2140/pjm.1978.79.251.
