= Gerry Thomas =

Canadian businessman and inventor

Gerry Thomas (February 17, 1922 – July 18, 2005) was a Canadian who moved to the US to become a salesman. He is sometimes credited with inventing prepackaged meals in 1952. Thomas, who worked for the Swanson food company in America in the 1950s and went public with his account decades later, said he designed the company's famous three-compartment aluminum tray after seeing a similar tray used by Pan Am Airways. He also said he coined the name "TV Dinner" for such meals, brainstormed the idea of having the packaging resemble a TV set, and contributed the recipe for the cornbread stuffing. Thomas later said he was uncomfortable with being called the "father" of the TV dinner, because he felt he just built upon existing ideas.

Thomas became a marketing and sales executive after Swanson was acquired by Campbell Soup in 1955. He retired in 1970 after suffering a heart attack, then did consultancy and briefly directed Grand Central Art Galleries in New York City. Thomas' wife described him as a gourmet cook who "never ate TV dinners".

In recent years, Thomas' TV Dinner role was disputed by former Swanson and Campbell employees, frozen food industry officials, and Swanson family heirs, who said the product was created by the Swanson brothers, Clarke and Gilbert. (M. Crawford Pollock, who was Swanson's in-house marketing chief at the time, was also said to have played a role.) After Thomas' death in 2005, a Los Angeles Times opinion article that labeled him a "charlatan" spurred other newspapers to reexamine the TV Dinner's origins. As a result, dozens of publications printed retractions on obituaries that had called Thomas the TV Dinner inventor. The New York Times said that although Thomas was "widely reported to have had the inspiration, there have been competing claims, including one from the Swanson family, that W. Clarke Swanson, an owner of the company in the 1950s, had the idea." However, Pinnacle Foods, which currently owns Swanson, still credits Thomas with proposing the TV Dinner concept. And an Arizona Republic editorial termed the debate over his TV Dinner involvement "surprisingly vindictive."

The Library of Congress says the history of the TV Dinner is murky, but notes that frozen dinners existed several years before Swanson made the idea famous.
