= Jessie O. Thomas =

American educator

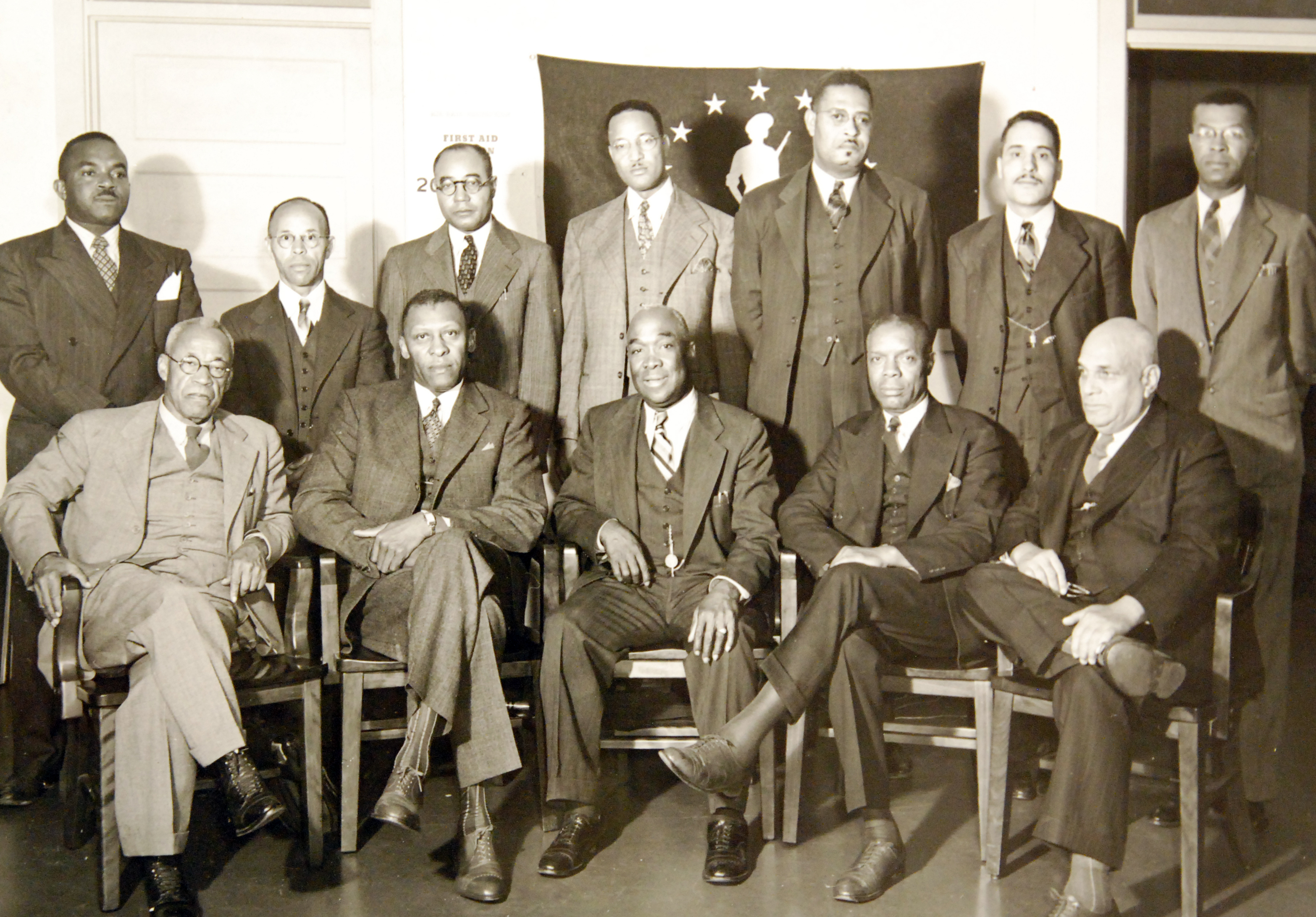
Among a group of prominent African Americans training with the Treasury Department to sell war bonds

Jessie O. Thomas (21 December 1885 – 18 February 1972) was a prominent African-American educator from Atlanta. He founded the Atlanta University School of Social Work in 1920 and was the first director of the Southern Field Division of the National Urban League.

He was born in Mississippi.

Thomas spoke at the 1921 opening of Joyland Park, Atlanta's first amusement park for Blacks. He was appointed to a Red Cross position and trained at the Treasury Department to sell war bonds.

In 1936, Thomas served as general manager of the Hall of Negro Life at the Texas Centennial Exposition.
