= List of Hertfordshire County Cricket Club List A players =

Hertfordshire County Cricket Club played in List A cricket matches between 1964 and 2003. This is a list of the players who appeared in those matches.

- Stuart Ambrose (1974–1976): SR Ambrose
- Steve Andrew (1999–2000): SJW Andrew
- John Appleyard (1966–1974): JD Appleyard
- Andy Armstrong (2002): A Armstrong
- Alan Bell (1966): TA Bell
- Ian Beven (1981): IR Beven
- Donald Bick (1971): DA Bick
- Stuart Boon (1964): SB Boon
- Bob Broadbent (1964): RG Broadbent
- Alan Burridge (1976–1977): AJ Burridge
- Stephen Burrow (1999–2000): S Burrow
- Gary Butcher (2003): GP Butcher
- John Carr (1991): JD Carr
- Cliff Cavener (1993–2001): CN Cavener
- Laurie Clough (1964–1971): TL Clough
- Brian Collins (1969–1987): BG Collins
- Francis Collyer (1969–1986): FE Collyer
- Lenny Cooper (2001): LMG Cooper
- Steve Cordingley (2001–2003): SG Cordingley
- Stuart Cradock (1976): S Cradock
- Tom Cranston (2001): TP Cranston
- John Cundle (1964): JWJ Cundle
- Alan Day (1966–1974): AR Day
- Stephen Dean (1983–1987): SA Dean
- Christopher Debenham (1977): CJ Debenham
- Dilip Doshi (1976): DR Doshi
- Micky Dunn (1971–1981): MT Dunn
- Richard Ellis (1993): RGP Ellis
- Justin Engelke (2000): JM Engelke
- Brian Evans (1983–1991): BG Evans
- David Evans (1969): DJ Evans
- Matthew Evans (1999–2002): MR Evans
- Mark Everett (1999–2002): MA Everett
- Jonathan Fellows-Smith (1966): JP Fellows-Smith
- Iain Fletcher (1990–2003): I Fletcher
- Ben Frazer (2001–2003): BJ Frazer
- Robin Gardner (1964–1966): LR Gardner
- Alan Garofall (1971–1989): AR Garofall
- Nicholas Gilbert (1984–1999): N Gilbert
- Neil Gladwin (2001): N Gladwin
- Mark Gouldstone (1993): MR Gouldstone
- Andy Griffin (1999–2000): AD Griffin
- Robert Hailey (1983–1988): RJ Hailey
- Gordon Harris (1990–1993): GAR Harris
- Jonathon Harvey (1993): JD Harvey
- Steve Henderson (1987–1989): SP Henderson
- Reuben Herbert (1987): R Herbert
- Basil Hollington (1971–1974): HB Hollington
- David Hughes (1999–2000): ND Hughes
- John Iberson (1964–1966): J Iberson
- Nigel Ilott (1993): NJ Ilott
- Martin James (1993–2002): MH James
- Richard Jerome (2000): RS Jerome
- Robin Johns (1976–1983): RL Johns
- Ian Jones (1969): CIM Jones
- Kafeel Jahangir (1993–2000): Kafeel Jahangir
- Ronnie Kotkamp (2002): R Kotkamp
- Derek Lane (1999): DM Lane
- Andy Lewis (2003): AS Lewis
- David Ligertwood (1991): DGC Ligertwood
- David Lowe (2001): D Lowe
- Stephen Lowe (2001): SJ Lowe
- Neil MacLaurin (1989–1991): NRC MacLaurin
- Kervin Marc (2002): K Marc
- Robin Marques (1964–1966): CVL Marques
- Bill Merry (1977–1991): WG Merry
- Andrew Miller (1988): AJT Miller
- Jamie Murch (2003): JCT Murch
- Peter Neal (1981–1988): EP Neal
- Andrew Needham (1989–1991): A Needham
- Martin Olley (1985–1989): MWC Olley
- Luke O'Reilly (1999): LJ O'Reilly
- Paul O'Reilly (2001–2002): PJ O'Reilly
- Wayne Osman (1974–1986): WM Osman
- David Ottley (1976–1986): DG Ottley
- Tom Pearman (2003): TJ Pearman
- Bob Pomphrey (1974–1981): RH Pomphrey
- Scott Ruskin (2001): SN Ruskin
- Robert Simons (1964–1966): RG Simons
- Tony Skeggs (2003): AE Skeggs
- David Smith (1989–1991): DM Smith
- Geoff Smith (1969): GJ Smith
- Matthew Smith (2001): ME Smith
- Tim Smith (1983–1990): TS Smith
- Len Stubbs (1969–1971): LG Stubbs
- David Surridge (1983–1993): D Surridge
- Steven Sylvester (1999–2000): SA Sylvester
- Chris Thomas (1983): C Thomas
- Henry Tilly (1964–1971): HW Tilly
- Neil Vartan (1990): RNR Vartan
- Michael Voss (1991): MF Voss
- Roy Wacey (1964–1976): RH Wacey
- Nick Walker (2001–2003): NGE Walker
- Matthew Walshe (1993): MJ Walshe
- David Ward (1999–2003): DM Ward
- Simon White (2001–2003): SP White
- James Wright (1974–1981): JDW Wright
- Lawrence Wright (1964): LW Wright
- Martin Wright (1986–1989): MCG Wright
- Nick Wright (1983–1991): NPG Wright
