= List of people from Welwyn Garden City =

Welwyn Garden City (/ˈwɛlɪn/ WEL-in) is a town in Hertfordshire, England. It is located approximately 20 miles (32 km) from Kings Cross, London. Founded in 1920, Welwyn Garden City was the second garden city in England. In 1948, it was designated one of the first new towns under the New Towns Act 1946.

The following notable people were born in, lived in, or are otherwise strongly associated with Welwyn Garden City.

== Academics ==
- Jack Goody (1919–2015), social anthropologist
- Jonathan M. Gregory, climate scientist
- Klaus Hasselmann (born 1931), Nobel Prize laureate, grew up in Welwyn Garden City
- Martin J. H. Mogridge (1940–2000), transportation researcher

== Arts ==
- Chris Floyd (born 1968), photographer
- Susanna Heron (born 1949), stone relief sculptor
- Andy Lomas (born 1967), digital artist

== Media ==
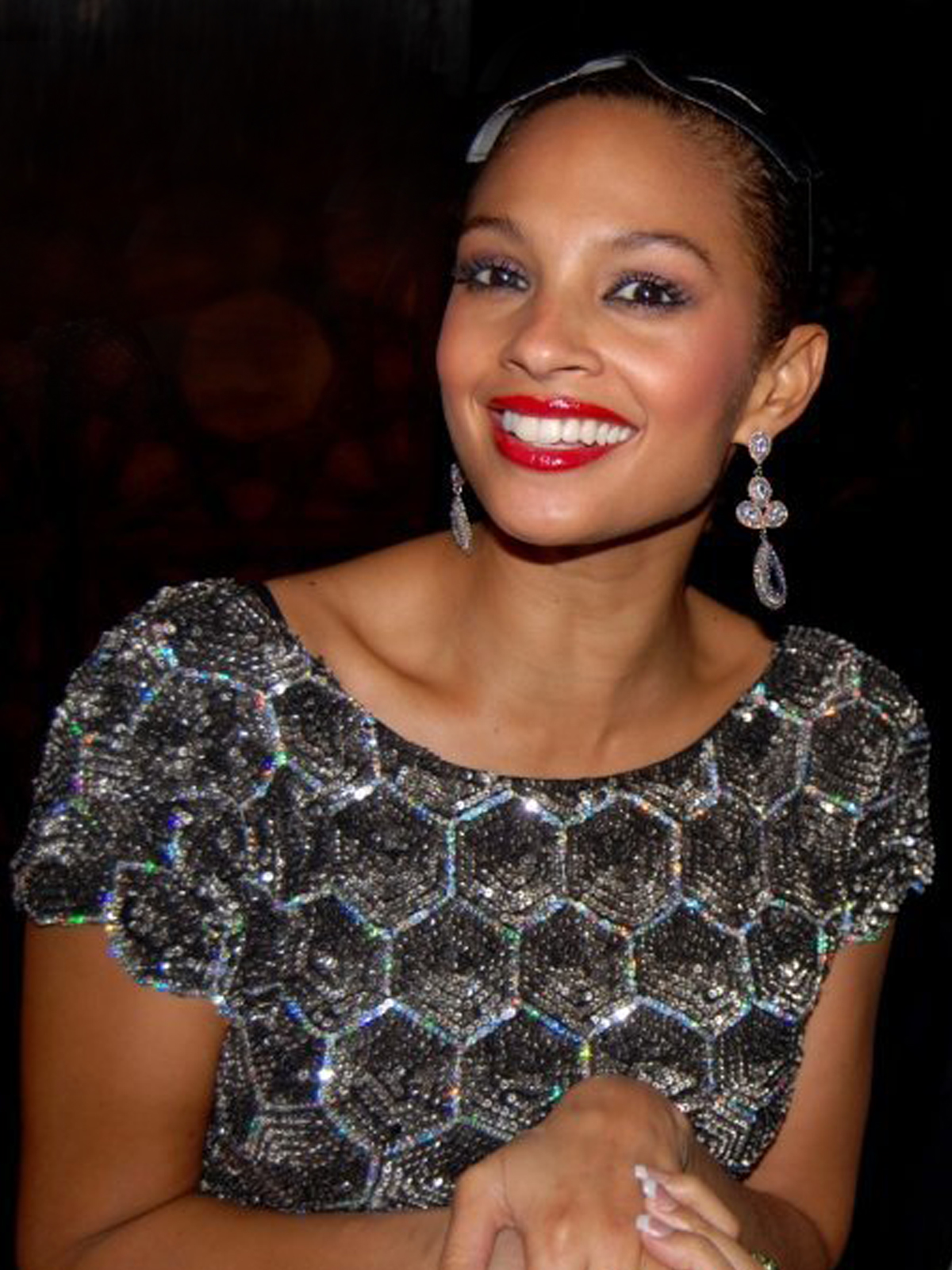
Alesha Dixon, media presenter and singer

- Colin Berry (1946–2025), disc jockey and newsreader
- Alesha Dixon (born 1978), media presenter, singer, model
- Briony McRoberts (1957–2013), film and television actress
- Jon Plowman (born 1953), television and film producer
- Edmund Purdom (1924–2009), stage and film actor
- Lisa Snowdon (born 1972), television presenter and model
- Una Stubbs (1937–2021), television actress
- Mark Thompson (born 1957), media executive
- Aiden Turner (born 1977), television actor and model
- Desmond Wilcox (1931–2000), documentary filmmaker

== Music ==
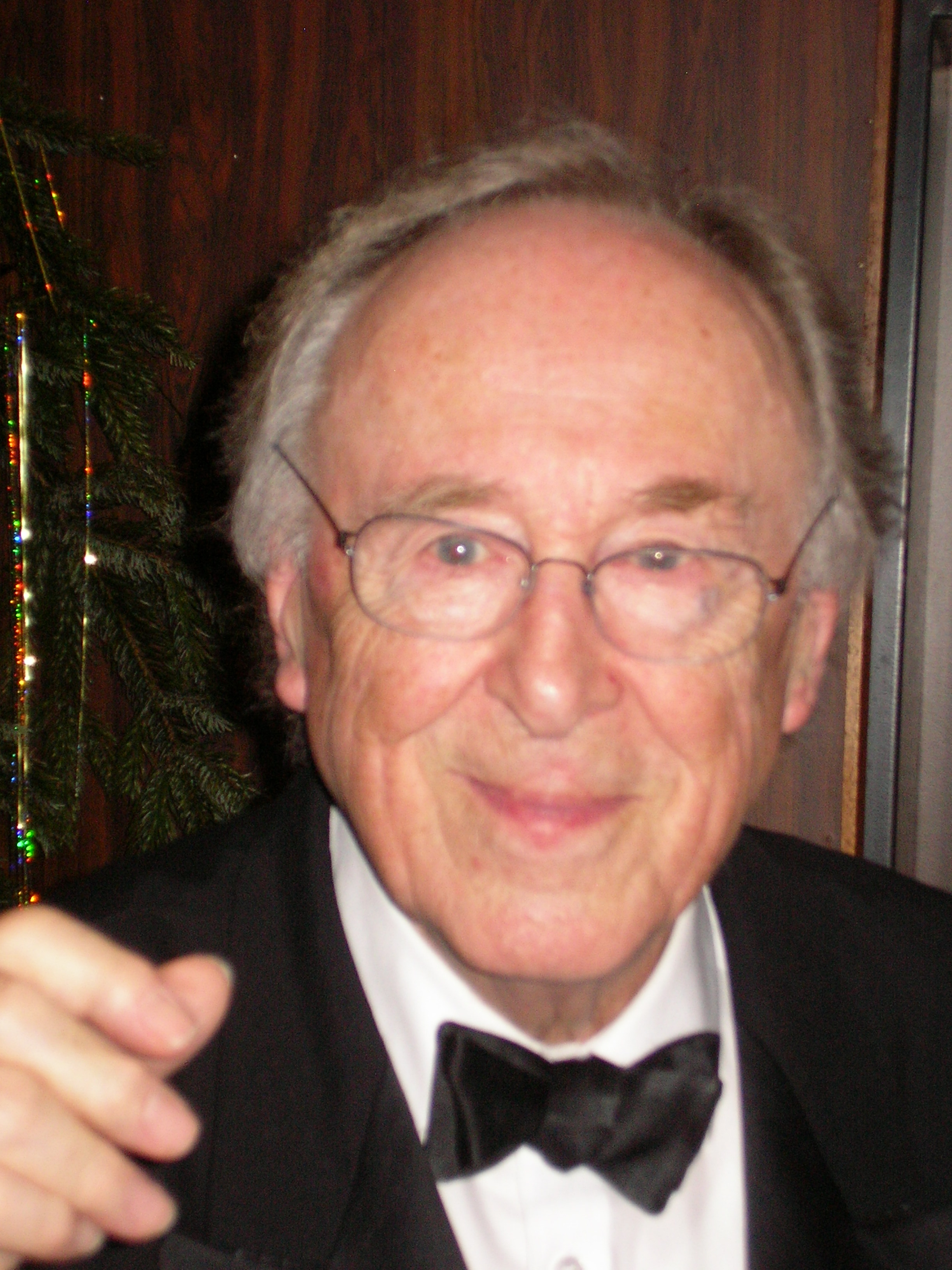
Chris Barber, jazz musician

- Chris Barber (1930–2021), jazz musician
- Jonathan Cole (born 1970), composer
- Lu Edmonds (born 1957), rock and folk musician
- Terry Ellis (born 1943), record producer
- Steve Kilbey (born 1954), singer-songwriter
- Alex Larke (born 1979), singer-songwriter
- Mat Osman (born 1967), bass guitarist
- Keith Reid (1946–2023), songwriter
- Mick Taylor (born 1949), rock musician

== Sports ==
=== Cricket ===
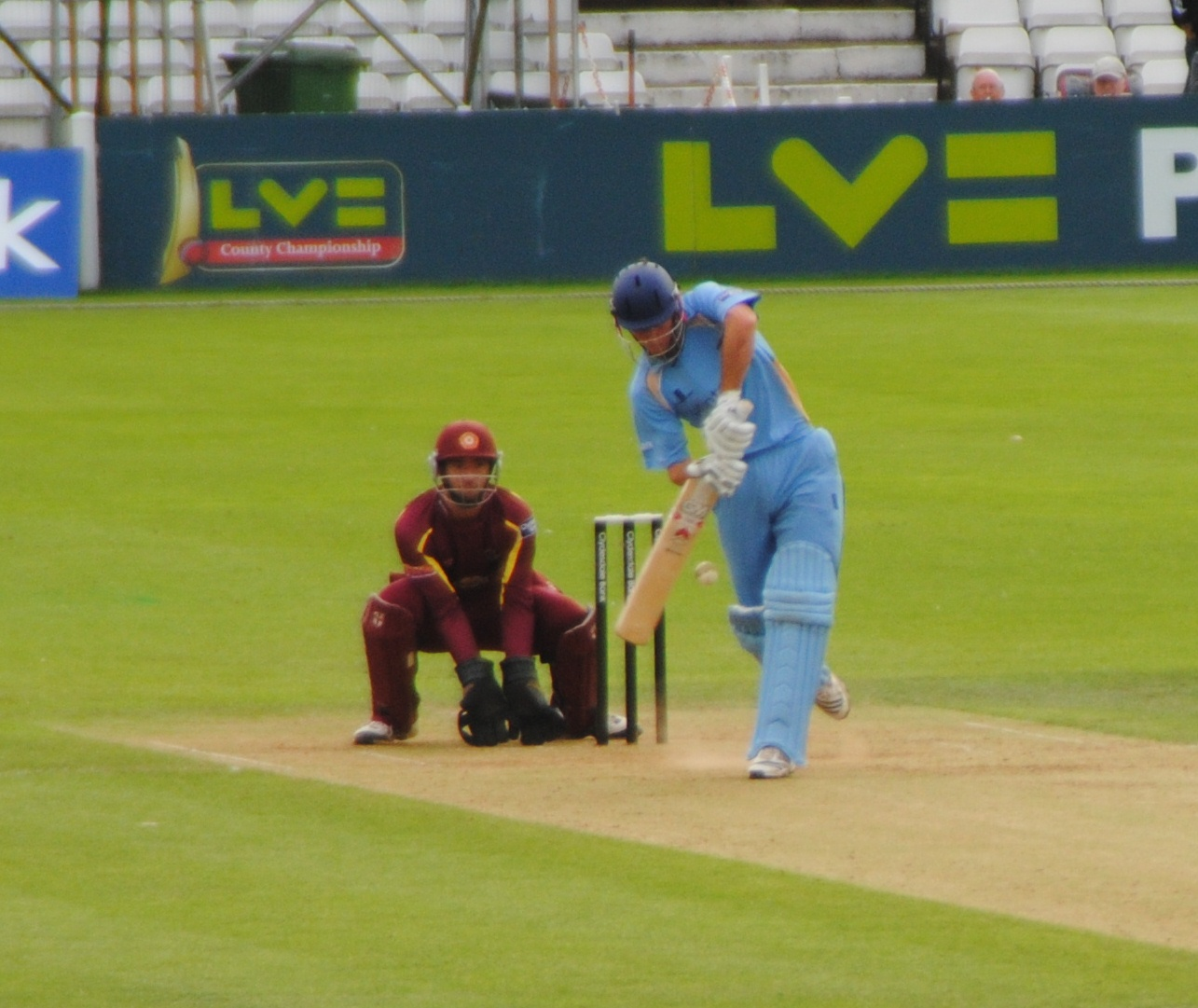
David Murphy, cricketer

- Simon Cowley (born 1979), cricketer
- John Cundle (born 1939), cricketer
- Stephen Dean (born 1964), cricketer
- Neil MacLaurin (born 1966), cricketer
- James Morris (born 1985), cricketer
- David Murphy (born 1989), cricketer
- Tom Pearman (born 1979), cricketer
- Robert Pitcher (born 1964), cricketer
- Luke Ryan (born 1988), cricketer
- Matthew Walshe (born 1970), cricketer

=== Football ===
- Luke Amos (born 1997), footballer
- Dominic Ball (born 1995), footballer
- Matt Ball (born 1993), footballer
- Damian Batt (born 1984), footballer
- Paul Cutler (born 1946), footballer
- Alex Davey (born 1994), footballer
- Mark Halsey (born 1961), football referee
- Ben Herd (born 1985), footballer
- Harry Hibbs (1906–1984), footballer
- David James (born 1970), footballer and coach
- Stuart Lewis (born 1987), footballer
- Ben Nugent (born 1992), footballer
- Mike Ryan (1930–2006), footballer
- Aaron Skelton (born 1974), footballer
- Oliver Skipp (born 2000), footballer
- Roger Smith (born 1944), footballer
- Jason Soloman (born 1970), footballer
- David Stephens (born 1991), footballer
- Harry Toffolo (born 1995), footballer

=== Others ===
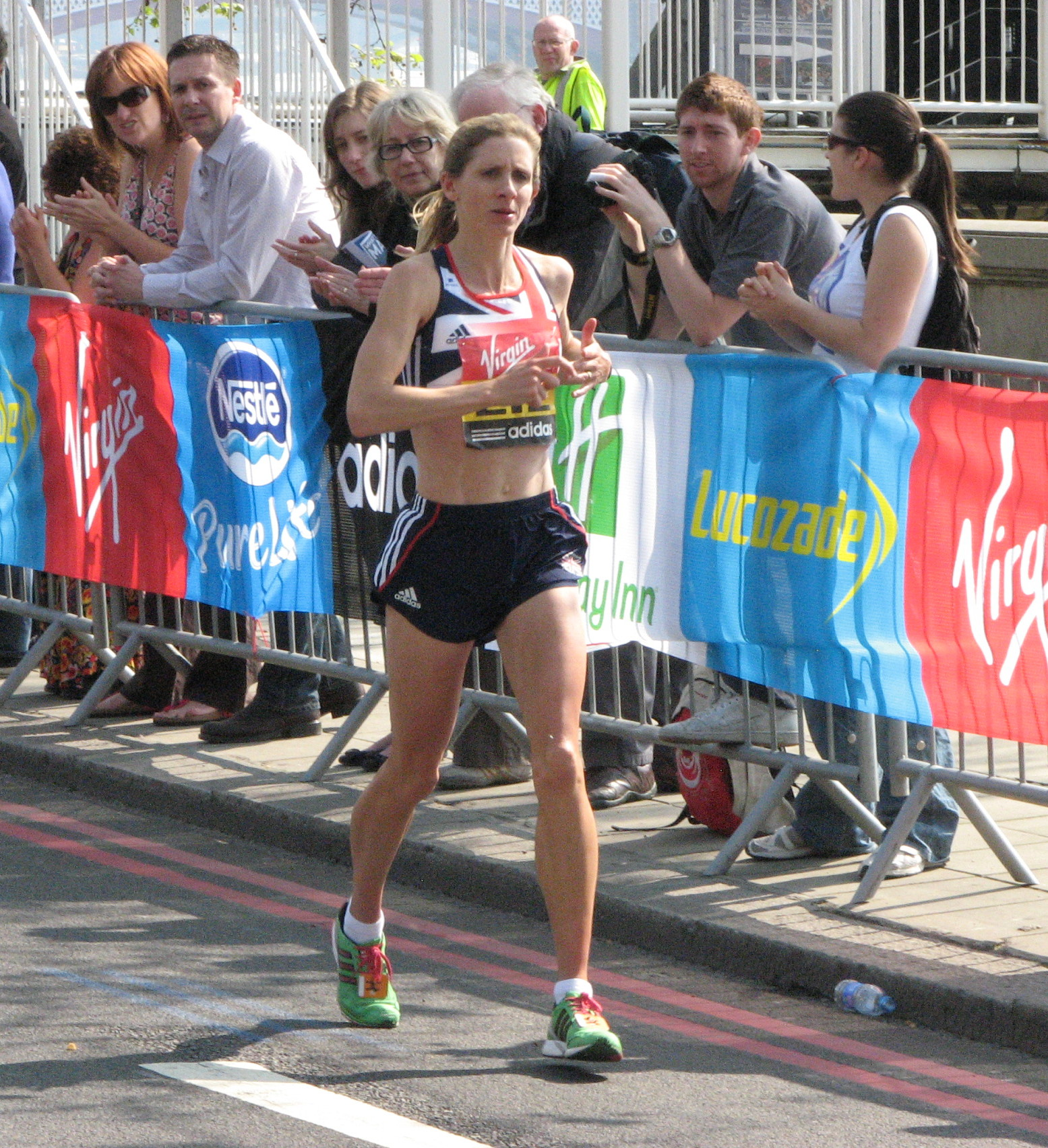
Liz Yelling, long-distance runner

- Nick Faldo (born 1957), golfer
- Jamie George (born 1990), rugby union player
- Lewis Gosling (born 2003), trampoline gymnast
- Tom Lewis (born 1991), golfer
- Brendan McKeown (born 1944), Olympic cyclist
- Hayley Sage (born 1986), Olympic diver
- Billy Joe Saunders (born 1989), professional middleweight boxer
- Gary Staines (born 1963), Olympic long-distance runner
- Jack Waller (born 1989), Olympic water polo player
- Liz Yelling (born 1974), Olympic long-distance runner

== Writing ==
- Paul Bright (born 1949), children's author
- Anthony Buckeridge (1912–2004), children's author
- Lewis Grassic Gibbon (1901–1935), novelist
- Jan Mark (1943–2006), children's author

== Miscellaneous ==
- Frederic Osborn (1885–1978), secretary of Welwyn Garden City Limited, founding company of Welwyn Garden City
- John Clements (1953–1976), posthumously awarded the George Cross for rescuing others from a 1976 hotel fire
- Andrew Lewin (born 1987), Member of Parliament for Welwyn Hatfield since 2024
