= 1926 in the United Kingdom =

Events from the year 1926 in the United Kingdom. The year was dominated by the general strike.

== Incumbents ==
- Monarch – George V
- Prime Minister – Stanley Baldwin (Conservative)

== Events ==
- 1 January – Law of Property Act 1925 and Administration of Estates Act 1925 come into effect modernising the laws on real estate and intestacy.
- 2 January – Contributory old age pensions payable to those between 65 and 70 years of age under the provisions of the Widows', Orphans', and Old-Age Contributory Pensions Act of 1925.
- 16 January – A British Broadcasting Company radio play by Ronald Knox about workers' revolution in London causes a panic among those who have not heard the preliminary announcement that it is a satire on broadcasting.
- 26 January – Scottish inventor John Logie Baird demonstrates his pioneering mechanical television system (which he calls a "televisor") at his London laboratory for members of the Royal Institution and a reporter from The Times.
- 31 January – British and Belgian troops leave Cologne.
- 9 February – Flooding of London suburbs.
- c. February – K2 red telephone box introduced, chiefly in London area.
- 6 March – The Shakespeare Memorial Theatre in Stratford-upon-Avon is destroyed by fire.
- 17 March – University of Reading chartered, the only institution to be newly granted full university status in the U.K. in the interwar period.
- 30 April – A state of emergency is proclaimed under the Emergency Powers Act 1920 on account of the "threat of cessation of work in Coal Mines".
- 1 May – Coal miners' lockout begins in Britain over planned pay reductions.
- 3 May – A general strike begins in support of the miners' strike at midnight 3–4 May.
- 4 May – The BBC broadcasts five news bulletins a day as no newspapers are published due to the general strike.
- 10 May – Talks between government and strikers begin.
- 12 May – The general strike ends at midnight 12–13 May without concessions to the strikers; coal miners remain on strike.
- 15 July – Re-Election of Ministers Act (1919) Amendment Act abolishes ministerial by-elections.
- 24 July – First greyhound racing track in Britain opens in Manchester.
- 6 August – American swimmer Gertrude Ederle becomes the first woman to swim the English Channel, from France to England.
- 7 August – The first British Grand Prix held at the Brooklands circuit near Weybridge.
- 18 August – The Miners' Federation of Great Britain begins negotiations with the government.
- 30 August – Cricketer Jack Hobbs scores 316 runs in a match at Lord's, the highest individual total scored at that ground.
- 29 November – Coal miners agree to end their national dispute and return to work. A majority of the Miners Federation have voted to continue the strike but with less than the required two-thirds majority.
- December – Imperial Chemical Industries formed by merger of Brunner Mond, Nobel Explosives, the United Alkali Company, and the British Dyestuffs Corporation.
- 2 December – The Prime Minister Stanley Baldwin ends the state of emergency that had been declared due to the miners' strike.
- 3 December – Disappearance of Agatha Chistie: Detective story writer Agatha Christie disappears from her home in Surrey; on 14 December she is found staying in a Harrogate hotel (under her husband's mistress's name).
- 7 December – The Council for the Preservation of Rural England, later the Campaign to Protect Rural England (CPRE), is founded by Patrick Abercrombie to limit urban sprawl and ribbon development.
- 15 December
  - Legitimacy Act 1926 permits the legitimisation of a child born to unmarried parents by their subsequent marriage to each other.
  - Judicial Proceedings (Regulation of Reports) Act, intended to restrict press reporting of salacious details in divorce cases.
  - Electricity (Supply) Act creates the Central Electricity Board to set up the National Grid.
- 31 December – Hadow report on The Education of the Adolescent published.

=== Undated ===
- New Ways, a house for Wenman Joseph Bassett-Lowke in Northampton, is designed by German architect Peter Behrens; it is "a pioneer of modern architecture in Britain".
- First appearance of the Gill Sans sans-serif typeface, designed by Eric Gill for Douglas Cleverdon.

== Publications ==
- Patrick Abercrombie's tract The Preservation of Rural England.
- Agatha Christie's Hercule Poirot novel The Murder of Roger Ackroyd.
- Georgette Heyer's historical romance novel These Old Shades.
- D. H. Lawrence's novel The Plumed Serpent.
- Hugh MacDiarmid's Scots language poem A Drunk Man Looks at the Thistle.
- A. A. Milne's children's book Winnie-the-Pooh.
- Dorothy L. Sayers' Lord Peter Wimsey novel Clouds of Witness.

== Births ==
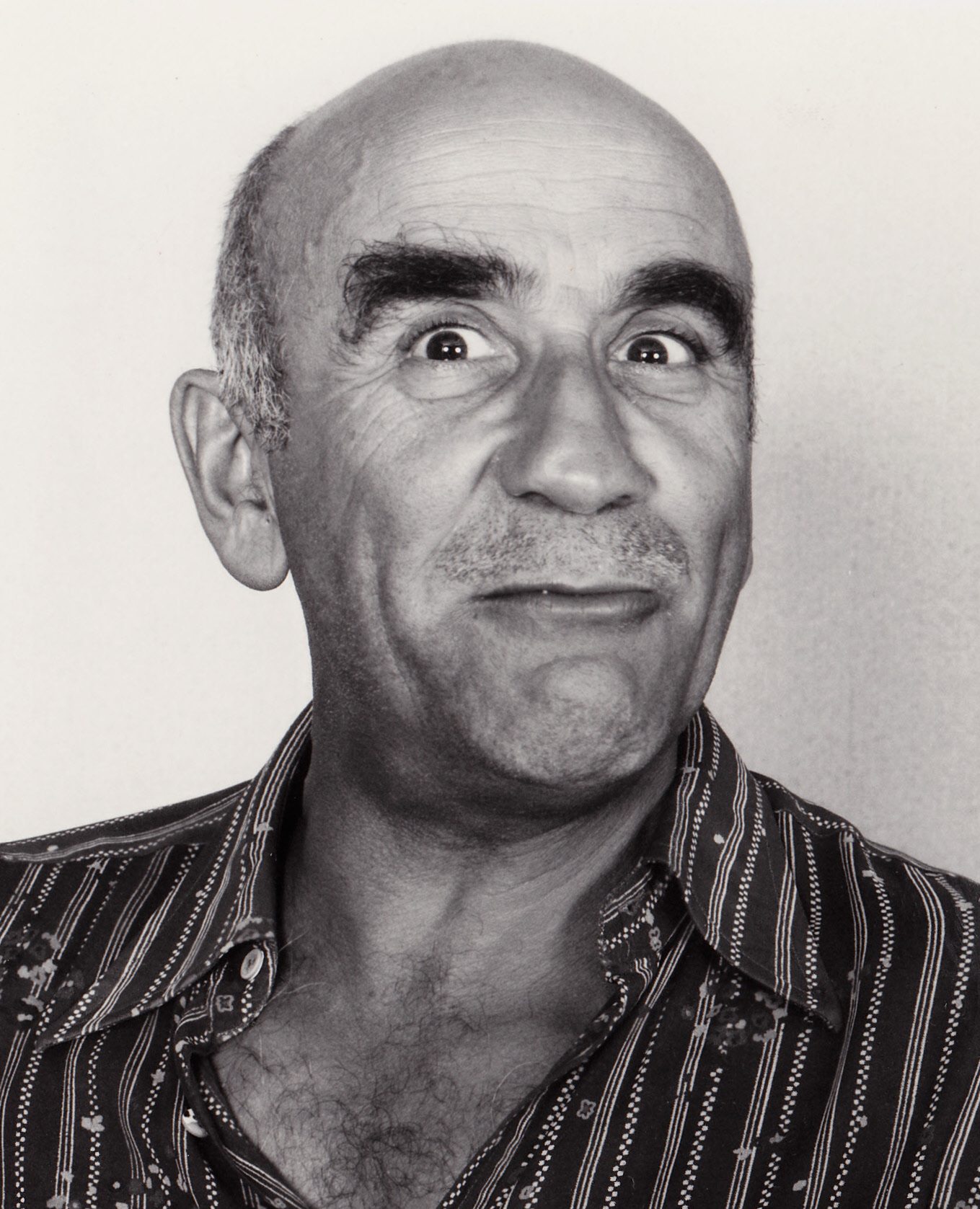
Warren Mitchell

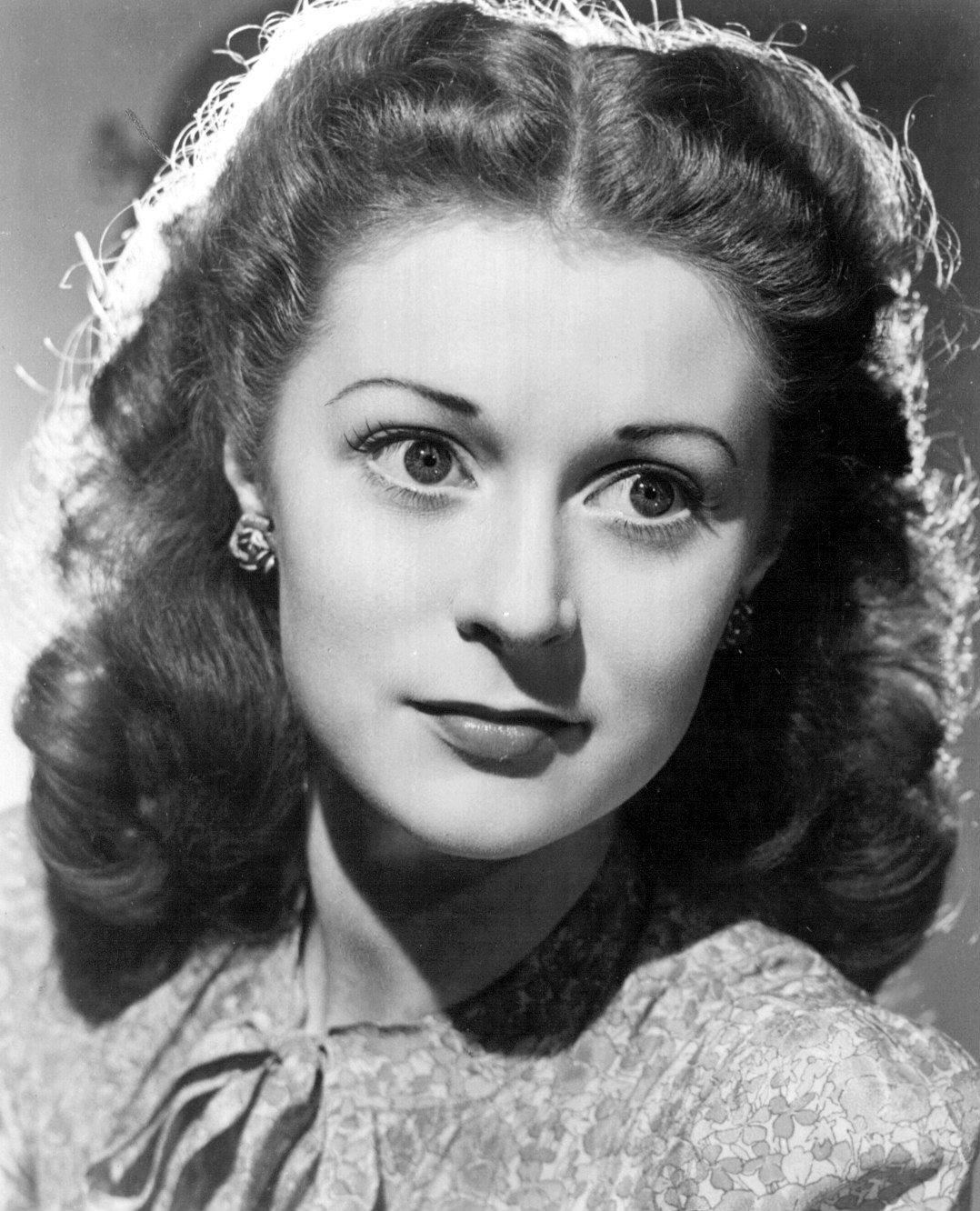
Moira Shearer

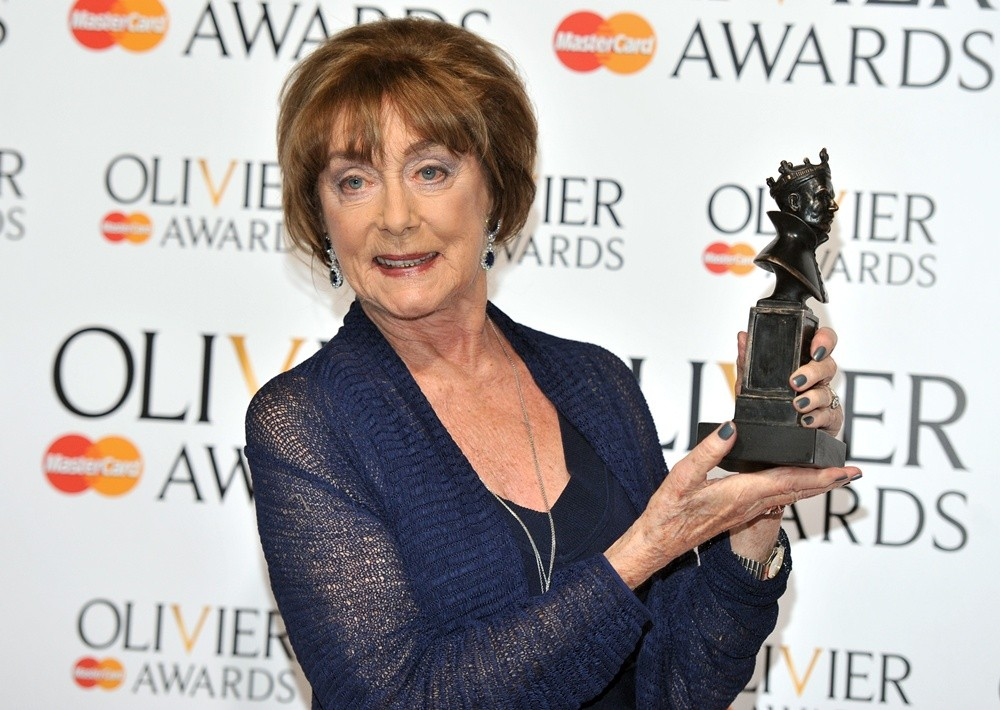
Gillian Lynne

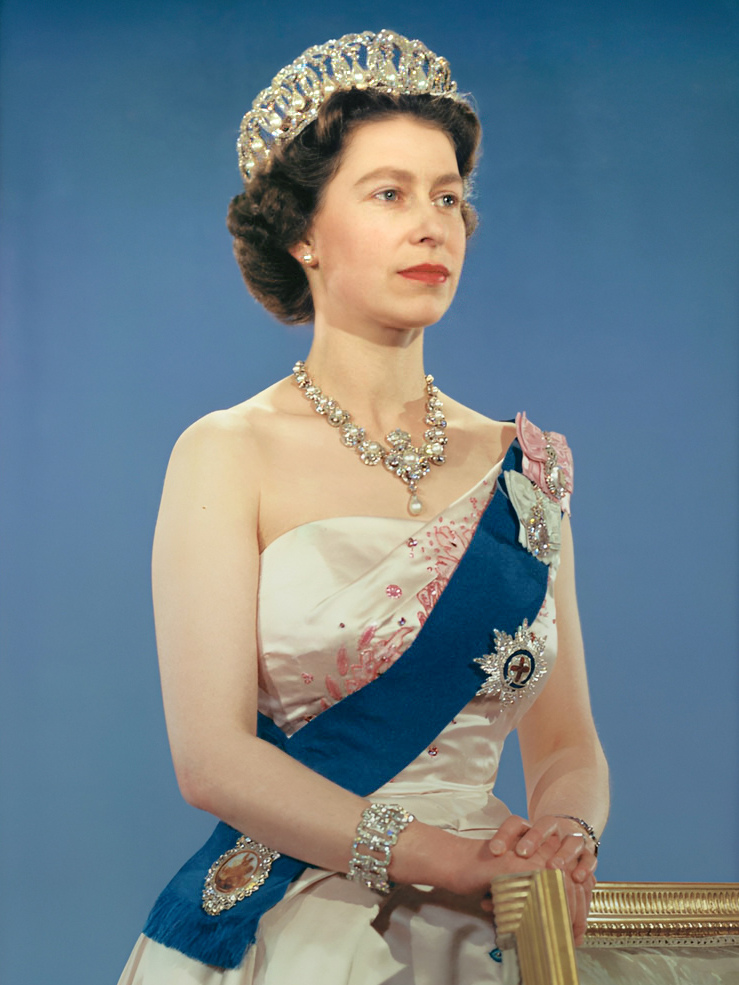
Elizabeth II

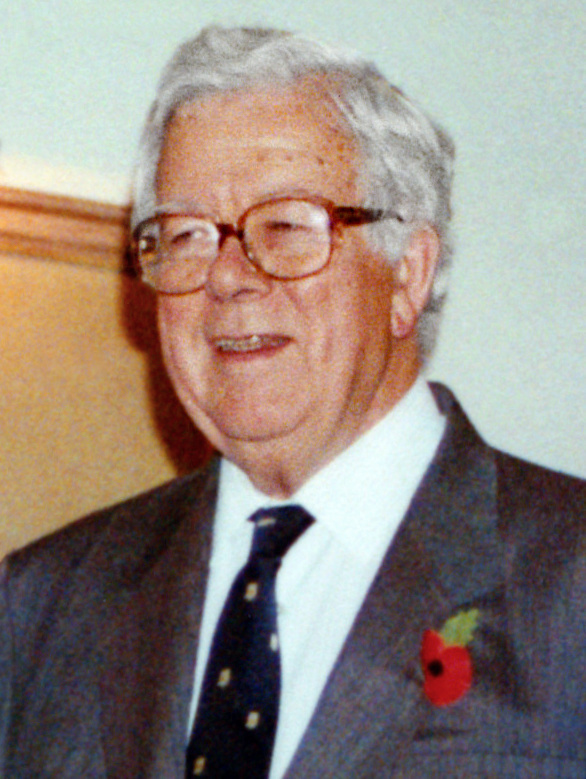
Geoffrey Howe

- 1 January – Laurie Clough, cricketer (died 2008)
- 3 January – George Martin, producer of The Beatles (died 2016)
- 4 January – Don Arden, music manager (died 2007)
- 5 January – Robin Leigh-Pemberton, Baron Kingsdown, peer, banker (died 2013)
- 13 January
  - Craigie Aitchison, painter (died 2009)
  - Michael Bond, author and creator of Paddington Bear (died 2017)
- 14 January – Warren Mitchell, actor (died 2015)
- 17 January – Moira Shearer, actress and dancer (died 2006)
- 19 January – Bob Wooler, disc jockey (died 2002)
- 20 January – Sarah Conlon, campaigner (died 2008)
- 25 January – Richard Davies, actor (died 2015)
- 26 January
  - Ronnie Hilton, singer and radio presenter (died 2001)
  - Charles Henderson Tidbury, brewing executive (died 2003)
- 2 February – David Whitfield, actor and singer (died 1980)
- 10 February
  - Danny Blanchflower, footballer and football manager (died 1993)
  - Hazel Court, actress (died 2008)
- 11 February – Alexander Gibson, conductor and founder of Scottish Opera (died 1995)
- 12 February – Paul Hamlyn, publisher and philanthropist (born in Germany; died 2001)
- 16 February
  - David C. H. Austin, rose breeder (died 2018)
  - John Schlesinger, film director (died 2003)
- 20 February – Gillian Lynne, choreographer (died 2018)
- 22 February – Kenneth Williams, actor (died 1988)
- 24 February – Reg Freeson, politician (died 2006)
- 1 March
  - Barbara Clegg, actress and scriptwriter (died 2025)
  - Bryan Jennett, neurosurgeon (died 2008)
- 2 March – George P. L. Walker, geologist (died 2005)
- 5 March – Norman Macfarlane, Baron Macfarlane of Bearsden, Scottish industrialist and politician (died 2021)
- 6 March – Ken Whyld, chess player and chess writer (died 2003)
- 8 March – Edith MacArthur, actress (died 2018)
- 11 March
  - Derek Benfield, actor (died 2009)
  - Dennis Wilshaw, footballer (died 2004)
- 12 March – Gudrun Ure, actress (died 2024)
- 14 March – Lita Roza, singer (died 2008)
- 19 March – Tony Collins, English football player and manager (died 2021)
- 22 March – Alastair Reid, Scottish poet and scholar of South American literature (died 2014)
- 24 March – Tony Streather, army officer (died 2018)
- 26 March – Frank Newby, structural engineer (died 2001)
- 27 March – Louis Blom-Cooper, lawyer (died 2018)
- 31 March – John Fowles, novelist (died 2005)
- 1 April – William Macpherson, Scottish High Court judge (died 2021)
- 2 April – Robert Holmes, scriptwriter (died 1986)
- 3 April – Timothy Bateson, actor (died 2009)
- 6 April – Ian Paisley, politician (died 2014)
- 8 April – David Neil MacKenzie, linguist (died 2001)
- 9 April – Gerry Fitt, politician (died 2005)
- 11 April – Gervase de Peyer, clarinetist (died 2017)
- 13 April – John Spencer-Churchill, 11th Duke of Marlborough, aristocrat (died 2014)
- 17 April – Gordon Rollings, actor (died 1985)
- 20 April – Cy Laurie, clarinetist (died 2002)
- 21 April
  - Arthur Rowley, footballer (died 2002)
  - Queen Elizabeth II (died 2022)
- 22 April – James Stirling, architect (died 1992)
- 24 April – Lady Elizabeth Cavendish, aristocrat and courtier (died 2018)
- 26 April – David Coleman, television sports broadcaster (died 2013)
- 29 April – Leonard Fenton, actor and director (died 2022)
- 30 April – Edmund Cooper, author and poet (died 1982)
- 2 May – Clive Jenkins, trade union leader (died 1999)
- 3 May – Eric Sams, musicologist and Shakespeare scholar (died 2004)
- 4 May – David Stoddart, Baron Stoddart of Swindon, politician (died 2020)
- 5 May – Maurice Taylor, Scottish Roman Catholic bishop (died 2023)
- 8 May – David Attenborough, broadcaster and naturalist
- 12 May – John Shipley Rowlinson, chemist and academic (died 2018)
- 14 May – Eric Morecambe, comedian (died 1984)
- 15 May – Anthony Shaffer (died 2001) and Peter Shaffer (died 2016), playwrights
- 16 May - Glen Michael, television presenter and children's entertainer (died 2025)
- 17 May
  - Cicely Berry, theatre director and voice coach (died 2018)
  - Tenniel Evans, actor (died 2009)
  - David Ogilvy, 13th Earl of Airlie, Scottish soldier, politician (died 2023)
- 19 May – Edward Parkes, engineer and academic (died 2019)
- 22 May – John Morrison, 2nd Viscount Dunrossil, peer and diplomat (died 2000)
- 23 May – Desmond Carrington, actor and broadcaster (died 2017)
- 24 May – Stanley Baxter, Scottish actor and screenwriter (died 2025)
- 25 May – David Wynne, sculptor (died 2014)
- 28 May – Colin Hutton, rugby union, rugby league player (died 2017)
- 29 May – Katie Boyle, Italian-British actress, television personality, and game-show panelist (died 2018)
- 1 June – Johnny Berry, footballer (died 1994)
- 4 June – Meredith Belbin, researcher and management consultant (died 2025)
- 8 June
  - Cranley Onslow, politician (died 2001)
  - David Williams, crime writer (died 2003)
- 10 June – Lionel Jeffries, actor and director (died 2010)
- 11 June – John Aspinall, zoo owner (died 2000)
- 17 June – Alan Walters, economist (died 2009)
- 20 June – Ernest Arthur Bell, biochemist (died 2006)
- 23 June – Lawson Soulsby, parasitologist (died 2017)
- 25 June – Dame Margaret Anstee, diplomat (died 2016)
- 26 June
  - Felicity Green, fashion journalist (died 2026)
  - Sir Rex Hunt, diplomat (died 2012)
  - Reg Newton, professional football goalkeeper (died 1976)
- 29 June – Denys Graham, Welsh actor (died 2024)
- 4 July – Willoughby Goddard, actor (died 2008)
- 5 July – Anthony Purssell, brewing executive, businessman and former athlete
- 7 July – Bobby McIlvenny, Northern Irish footballer (died 2016)
- 8 July – Ian Gilmour, Conservative politician (died 2007)
- 12 July – Cec Thompson, rugby league footballer (died 2011)
- 18 July
  - Elizabeth Jennings, poet (died 2001)
  - Robert Sloman, actor and journalist (died 2005)
- 21 July
  - Bill Pertwee, actor (died 2013)
  - Karel Reisz, Czech-born film director (died 2002)
- 22 July – Bryan Forbes, film director (died 2013)
- 27 July – Nina Lawson, wig-maker (died 2008)
- 30 July – Thomas Patrick Russell, High Court judge (died 2002)
- 1 August – Hannah Hauxwell, farmer and TV personality (died 2018)
- 3 August – Anthony Sampson, journalist and biographer (died 2004)
- 9 August – Willie Finlay, Scottish professional football player and coach (died 2014)
- 11 August – Bernard Ashley, businessman (died 2009)
- 13 August – Dennis Eagan, field hockey player (died 2012)
- 16 August – Christopher Polge, biologist (died 2006)
- 17 August – George Melly, jazz singer (died 2007)
- 19 August
  - George Daniels, horologist (died 2011)
  - Martin Halliday, physician (died 2008)
- 27 August – Pat Coombs, actress (died 2002)
- 4 September – George William Gray, Scottish-born chemist, pioneer of liquid crystal technology (died 2013)
- 6 September
  - Maurice Cowling, historian (died 2005)
  - Arthur Oldham, composer and choirmaster (died 2003)
- 7 September – Patrick Jenkin, Conservative politician (died 2016)
- 12 September – Dave Valentine, Scottish representative rugby union and rugby league footballer (died 1976)
- 17 September – Reginald Marsh, actor (died 2001)
- 18 September – Thomas Hetherington, barrister (died 2007)
- 24 September – Aubrey Burl, archaeologist (died 2020)
- 25 September – Stafford Beer, theorist and author (died 2002)
- 2 October – Jan Morris, born James Morris, travel writer (died 2020)
- 9 October – Ruth Ellis, nightclub hostess, last woman hanged in the UK (died 1955)
- 20 October
  - Austen Kark, television executive (died 2002)
  - Edward Douglas-Scott-Montagu, 3rd Baron Montagu of Beaulieu, aristocrat and founder of the National Motor Museum (died 2015)
- 21 October – Leonard Rossiter, actor (died 1984)
- 23 October – Janet Young, Baroness Young, politician (died 2002)
- 31 October – Jimmy Savile, disc jockey, broadcast presenter, philanthropist and serial sex offender (died 2011)
- 5 November – John Berger, art critic, novelist and painter (died 2017)
- 6 November – Frank Carson, comedian (died 2012)
- 8 November – John Louis Mansi, actor (died 2010)
- 11 November – Harold Perkin, social historian (died 2004)
- 12 November – Robert Goff, Baron Goff of Chieveley, lawyer and judge (died 2016)
- 14 November – Quentin Crewe, journalist and writer (died 1998)
- 20 November – John Gardner, writer (died 2007)
- 25 November
  - Terry Hall, ventriloquist (died 2007)
  - Terry Kilburn, actor
  - Peter Wright, ballet director and choreographer
- 28 November – David Alexander, Royal Marines general (died 2017)
- 17 December – John Poole, sculptor (died 2009)
- 18 December – Charles Whiting, military historian (died 2007)
- 20 December – Geoffrey Howe, Baron Howe of Aberavon, politician (died 2015)
- 22 December – Roberta Leigh, writer, artist and television producer (died 2014)
- 25 December – Barry Driscoll, painter and sculptor (died 2006)
- 26 December – Timothy Dudley-Smith, Anglican bishop and hymn writer (died 2024)
- 30 December – Stan Tracey, jazz musician (died 2013)

== Deaths ==
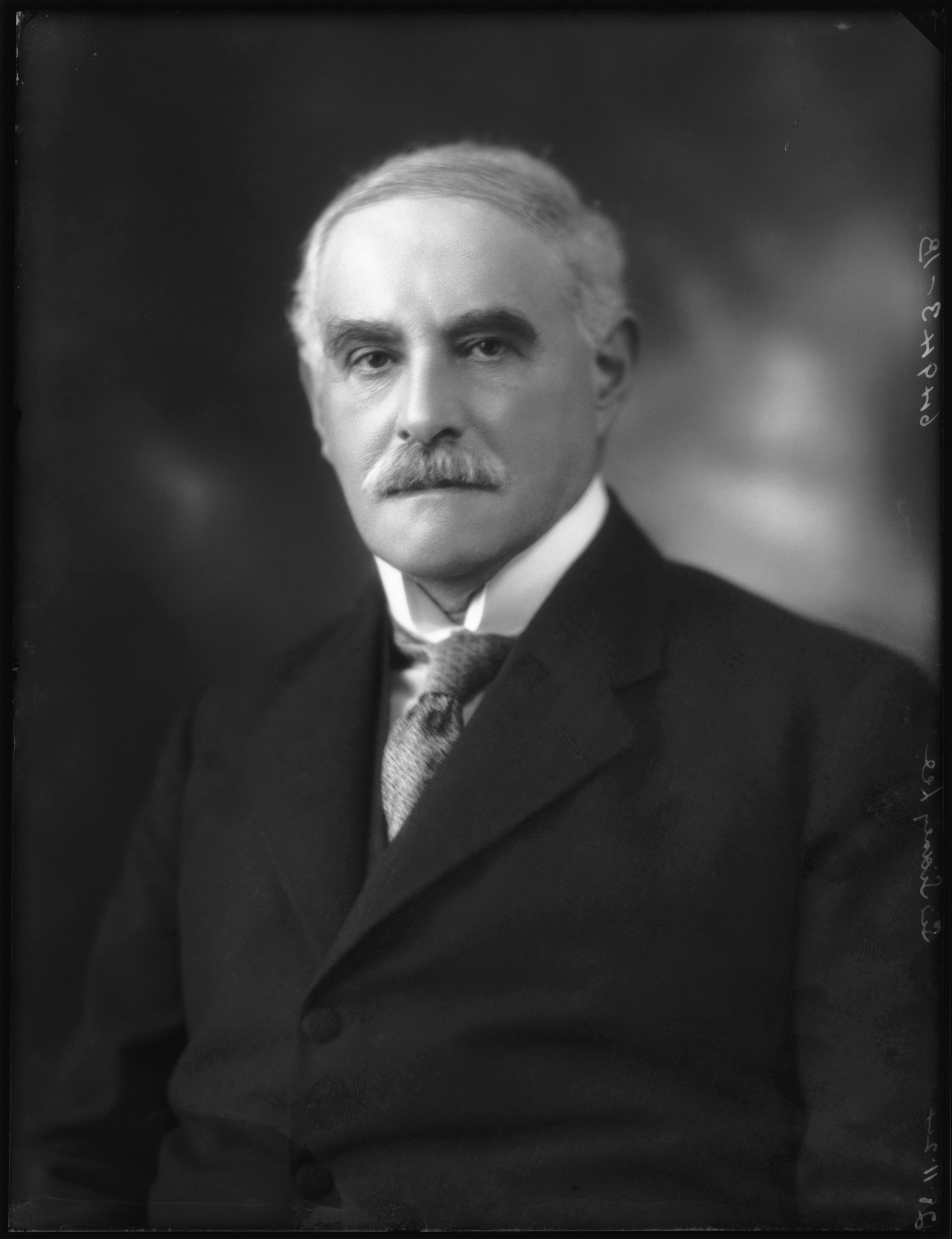
Sidney Lee

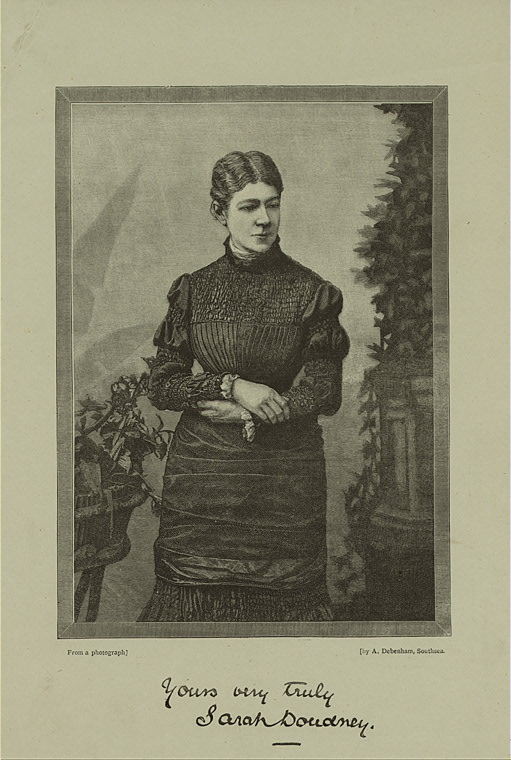
Sarah Doudney

- 6 January – John Bowers, Anglican suffragan Bishop of Thetford (born 1854)
- 28 January – Sir Ernest Troubridge, admiral (born 1862)
- 1 February – William Heap Bailey, Scottish footballer (born 1847)
- 7 February – William Evans Hoyle, director of the National Museum of Wales (born 1855)
- 8 February – William Bateson, geneticist (born 1861)
- 13 February – Francis Ysidro Edgeworth, Anglo-Irish political economist (born 1845)
- 13 February – Reginald Hargreaves, cricketer (born 1852)
- 3 March – Sir Sidney Lee, biographer (born 1859)
- 29 March – Charles Crook, teacher, trade unionist and politician (born 1862)
- 4 April – Thomas Burberry, businessman and inventor (born 1835)
- 9 May – J. M. Dent, publisher (born 1849)
- 21 May – Ronald Firbank, novelist (born 1886)
- 24 May – Sir Thomas Erskine Holland, academic lawyer (born 1835)
- 8 June – Emily Hobhouse, welfare campaigner (born 1860)
- 2 July – Laurence George Bomford, artist (born 1847)
- 12 July – Gertrude Bell, archaeologist, writer, spy, and administrator known as the "Uncrowned Queen of Iraq" (born 1868)
- 1 August – Israel Zangwill, novelist, poet and playwright (born 1864)
- 25 September – Herbert Booth, Salvationist, third son of William and Catherine Booth (born 1862)
- 28 September – Helen Allingham, watercolour painter and illustrator (born 1848)
- 5 October – Dorothy Tennant (Lady Stanley), artist (born 1855)
- 12 October – Edwin Abbott Abbott, schoolmaster and theologian (born 1838)
- 13 October – Eliseus Williams ("Eifion Wyn"), poet (born 1867)
- 4 November – John Owen, Bishop of St David's (born 1854)
- 15 November – Marjory Newbold, political activist (born 1883)
- 4 December – Ferdinand Begg, Scottish stockbroker and politician (born 1847)
- 8 December – Sarah Doudney, novelist, children's writer and hymnist (born 1841)

== See also ==
- List of British films of 1926
