= 1978 in the United Kingdom =

Events from the year 1978 in the United Kingdom.

== Incumbents ==
- Monarch – Elizabeth II
- Prime Minister – James Callaghan (Labour)

== Events ==
=== January ===
- 1 January – The otter becomes a protected species, ending hunting of it.
- 11 January – A North Sea storm surge ruins four piers in the UK: Herne Bay, Margate, Hunstanton and Skegness.
- 16 January – The firefighters strike ends after three months when fire crews accept an offer of a 10% pay rise and reduced working hours.
- 18 January – The European Court of Human Rights finds the United Kingdom government guilty of mistreating prisoners in Northern Ireland, but not guilty of torture.
- 30 January – Opposition leader Margaret Thatcher says that many Britons fear being "swamped by people with a different culture".
- 31 January – 18-year-old prostitute Helen Rytka is murdered in Huddersfield; she is believed to be the eighth victim of the Yorkshire Ripper.

=== February ===
- 9 February – Gordon McQueen, 25-year-old Scotland central defender, becomes Britain's first £500,000 footballer in a transfer from Leeds United to Manchester United.
- 13 February
  - Anna Ford becomes the first female newsreader on ITN.
  - An opinion poll conducted for the Daily Mail shows the Conservative opposition 11 points ahead of the Labour government, with an election due by October next year. The turnaround in fortunes for the Conservatives, who last month were narrowly behind Labour, is attributed to Margaret Thatcher's recent comments on immigration.
- 17 February – Twelve people are killed in the La Mon restaurant bombing in Belfast.
- 18 February – Twenty suspects are arrested in connection with the La Mon restaurant bombing.
- 20 February – Severe blizzards hit the south west of England.

=== March ===
- 8 March – The Hitchhiker's Guide to the Galaxy first broadcast by BBC Radio 4.
- 26 March – The body of 21-year-old prostitute and mother-of-two Yvonne Pearson, who was last seen alive on 21 January, is found in Leeds. The Yorkshire Ripper is believed to have been responsible.
- 30 March – Conservative Party recruit advertising agency Saatchi & Saatchi to revamp their image.

=== April ===
- April – First official naturist beach opens at Fairlight Glen in Covehurst Bay near Hastings.
- 3 April – Permanent radio broadcasts of proceedings in the House of Commons begin.
- 6 April – State Earnings-Related Pension Scheme introduced.
- 23 April – Nottingham Forest win the Football League First Division title for the first time in their history. Their manager Brian Clough, who guided their East Midlands rivals Derby County to the title six years ago, becomes only the third manager in history to lead two different clubs to top division title glory; the others were Tom Watson with Sunderland and Liverpool before WWI, and Herbert Chapman with Huddersfield Town and Arsenal during the interwar years.

=== May ===
- 1 May – Early May Bank Holiday observed for the first time.
- 4 May – Altab Ali is murdered in East London in a racially motivated attack which mobilises the British Bangladeshi community to protest.
- 6 May – Ipswich Town win the FA Cup for the first time by beating Arsenal 1–0 in the Wembley final.
- 10 May – Liverpool F.C. retain the European Cup with a 1–0 win over Club Brugge K.V., the Belgian champions, at Wembley Stadium.
- 16 May – 40-year-old prostitute Vera Millward is found stabbed to death in the grounds of the Manchester Royal Infirmary Hospital; she is believed to have been the tenth woman to die at the hands of the Yorkshire Ripper. Both of the victims killed outside Yorkshire have been killed in Manchester.
- 17 May – Charlie Chaplin's coffin, stolen 11 weeks previously, is found in a field about a mile away from the Chaplin home in Corsier near Lausanne, Switzerland.
- 25 May – Liberal Party leader David Steel announces that the Lib–Lab pact will be dissolved at the end of the current Parliamentary session by mutual consent, leaving Britain with a minority Labour government.
- 31 May – Labour wins the Hamilton by-election, retaining it in the face of a strong challenge from the Scottish National Party in that seat.

=== June ===
- 1 June – William Stern is declared bankrupt with debts of £118 million, the largest bankruptcy in British history at the time.
- 3 June – Freddie Laker is knighted.
- 8 June
  - Naomi James becomes the first woman to sail around the world single-handedly.
  - St Mary's Church in Barnes, London is gutted by fire.
- 13–16 June – The Romanian dictator Nicolae Ceaușescu and his wife Elena pay a state visit to the United Kingdom. He is made a Knight of the Order of the Bath, and she an honorary professor of the Polytechnic of Central London.
- 17 June – Media reports suggest that a general election will be held this autumn as the minority government led by James Callaghan and Labour appears to be nearing the end of its duration. Callaghan's chances of an election win are now looking brighter than they were four months ago, as the 11-point Conservative lead has evaporated.
- 19 June – Cricketer Ian Botham becomes the first man in the history of the game to score a century and take eight wickets in one innings of a Test match.
- 21 June
  - An outbreak of shooting between Provisional IRA members and the British Army leaves one civilian and three IRA men dead.
  - The Andrew Lloyd Webber musical Evita opens at the Prince Edward Theatre in London.

=== July ===
- 6 July – Eleven people are killed in the Taunton train fire.
- 7 July – Solomon Islands are annexed to the Crown and become independent from the United Kingdom.
- 15 July – The Picnic at Blackbushe Aerodrome, Camberley, Surrey, a concert featuring Bob Dylan, Eric Clapton and Joan Armatrading, attracts some 200,000 people.
- 25 July
  - Louise Brown becomes the world's first human born from in vitro fertilisation, in Oldham.
  - Motability, a charity which provides cars to disabled people, founded.

=== August ===
- 10 August – Financially troubled carmaker Chrysler agrees to sell its European operations, including the former Rootes Group factories in Britain, to French carmaker Peugeot with effect from 1 January 1979.
- 20 August – Gunmen open fire on an Israeli El Al airline bus in London.
- 25 August – U.S. Army Sergeant Walter Robinson "walks" across the English Channel in 11 hours 30 minutes, using homemade water shoes.

=== September ===
- 7 September
  - Prime Minister James Callaghan announces that he will not call a general election for this autumn, and faces accusations from Tory leader Margaret Thatcher and Liberal leader David Steel of "running scared", in spite of many opinion polls showing that Labour (currently a minority government) could win an election now with a majority, safeguarding its place in government until 1983. Callaghan also announces that the Lib-Lab pact, formed 18 months ago when the government lost its majority, has reached its end.
  - Bulgarian dissident Georgi Markov, 49, is stabbed with a poison-tipped umbrella as he walks across Waterloo Bridge, London, probably on orders of Bulgarian intelligence; he dies 4 days later.
- 15 September – German terrorist Astrid Proll arrested in London.
- 19 September – British Police launch a massive murder hunt, following the discovery of the dead body of newspaper boy Carl Bridgewater (13) at a farmhouse near Kingswinford in the West Midlands. Carl is believed to have been shot dead after disturbing a burglary at the property.
- 26 September – 23 Ford car plants are closed across Britain due to strikes.

=== October ===
- 17 October – A cull of Grey seals in the Orkney and Western Islands reduced after a public outcry.
- 23 October – The government announces plans for a new single exam to replace O Levels and CSEs.
- 25 October – A ceremony marks the completion of Liverpool Cathedral, for which the foundation stone was laid in 1904.
- 27 October – Four people die and four others are wounded in a shooting spree which began in a residential street in West Bromwich and ends at a petrol station some 20 miles away in Nuneaton.
- 28 October – Barry Williams, aged 36, is arrested in Derbyshire and charged with the previous day's shootings following a high-speed police chase.

=== November ===
- 3 November – Dominica gains its independence from the United Kingdom.
- 4 November – Many British bakeries impose bread rationing after a baker's strike led to panic buying of bread.
- 5 November – Rioters sack the British Embassy in Tehran.
- 10 November – Panic buying of bread stops as most bakers go back to work.
- 18 November – The British leg of the 1978 Kangaroo tour concludes with Australia winning the Ashes series by defeating Great Britain in the third and deciding Test match in Leeds.
- 20 November – Buckingham Palace announces that The Prince Andrew is to join the Royal Navy.
- 23 November – Pollyanna's nightclub in Birmingham is forced to lift its ban on black and Chinese revellers, after a one-year investigation by the Commission for Racial Equality concludes that the nightclub's entry policy was racist.
- 29 November – Viv Anderson, the 22-year-old Nottingham Forest defender, becomes England's first black international footballer when he appears in 1–0 friendly win over Czechoslovakia at Wembley Stadium – six months after he became the first black player to feature in an English league championship winning team and was also on the winning side in the final of the Football League Cup.
- 30 November – An industrial dispute closes down The Times newspaper (until 12 November 1979).

=== December ===
- Four men aged between 17 and 50 are charged with the murder of newspaper boy Carl Bridgewater at a farmhouse near Stourbridge in September this year. They are also accused of other armed robberies including a raid on a farmhouse near Halesowen and another at a Tesco supermarket on Birmingham's Castle Vale estate.
- 10 December – Peter D. Mitchell wins the Nobel Prize in Chemistry "for his contribution to the understanding of biological energy transfer through the formulation of the chemiosmotic theory".
- 14 December – The Labour minority government survives a vote of confidence.
- 21–22 December – The BBC is hit by a series of strikes. From Thursday 21 December, BBC One and BBC Two television are taken off air, as the BBC members of the ABS union strike over pay. On 22 December, the ABS union calls its radio members out on strike, which leads to the merging of BBC Radio 1, 2, 3 and 4 into one national radio network, which from 4.00 pm that day provides a management-run schedule of news and music. With the strike called so close to Christmas, the BBC does not want their festive television programming to be interrupted (Bill Cotton, the controller of BBC One, has prepared two Christmas schedules for BBC One, one if there is no strike, and one filled with repeats and films if there is), and so the BBC and ABS go to the government's conciliation service ACAS, and a deal is reached by 10.00 pm on 22 December, with the unions getting a 15% pay rise. BBC One and Two return to normal service by lunchtime on Saturday 23 December, with all BBC radio stations resuming normal programming at breakfast time of the same day.
- 23 December – The Marxist writer Malcolm Caldwell is shot dead in Cambodia shortly after meeting Pol Pot.

=== Undated ===
- Inflation reaches a six-year low of 8.3%, although unemployment is at a postwar high of 1,500,000.
- West midlands motorcycle manufacturer Norton Villiers Triumph is liquidated.
- Concrete Cows first erected in Milton Keynes.

== Publications ==
- J. G. Farrell's novel The Singapore Grip.
- Ken Follett's novel Eye of the Needle.
- Graham Greene's novel The Human Factor.
- Ian McEwan's novel The Cement Garden.
- Iris Murdoch's novel The Sea, the Sea.
- Roger Hargreaves' children’s books Timbuctoo (first twelve of a series of 25 books).

== Births ==
- 1 January – Alex Leigh, model
- 1 January – Phillip Mulryne, footballer
- 7 January – Dean Cosker, cricketer
- 17 January
  - Warren Feeney, footballer
  - Ricky Wilson, singer-songwriter
- 12 February – Gethin Jones, Welsh rugby player and television host
- 20 February – Jakki Degg, model
- 22 February – Jenny Frost, English singer and dancer
- 16 March – Anneliese Dodds, politician
- 22 March – Samantha Judge, Scottish field hockey forward
- 27 March – Romesh Ranganathan, comedian and broadcaster
- 31 March – Stephen Clemence, footballer
- 3 April – Matthew Goode, actor
- 7 April – Duncan James, actor and singer in boyband Blue
- 9 April – Rachel Stevens, singer
- 21 April – Carl Greenidge, cricketer
- 24 April – Beth Storry, field hockey goalkeeper
- 14 May – Emma Rochlin, Scottish field hockey defender
- 22 May – Katie Price, model and television personality
- 26 May – Laurence Fox, actor and political activist
- 29 May - Adam Rickitt, actor and singer
- June – Miranda Grell, Labour Councillor and first person to be found guilty of making false statements under the Representation of the People Act 1983
- 6 June – Carl Barât, singer and guitarist of rock band The Libertines
- 9 June – Matt Bellamy, lead singer of rock band Muse
- 14 June – Camilla Tominey, journalist and broadcaster
- 20 June – Frank Lampard, footballer
- 21 June – Tom Lister, actor
- 22 June – Dan Wheldon, racing driver (died 2011)
- 30 June – Romesh Ranganathan, comedian
- 2 July
  - Paul Danan, actor (died 2025)
  - Owain Yeoman, actor
- 9 July – Olivia Poulet, actress
- 23 July – Stuart Elliott, footballer
- 25 July – Louise Brown, first human born through in vitro fertilisation
- 31 July
  - Will Champion, musician
  - Justin Wilson, racing driver (died 2015)
- 5 August – Michael Bridges, football player and manager
- 19 August – Callum Blue, actor
- 22 August – James Corden, actor
- 23 August – Neil Gladwin, cricketer
- 27 August – Suranne Jones, actress
- 18 September – Ryan Lowe, football player and manager
- 23 September – Andy Fanton, cartoonist & writer
- 25 September – Jodie Kidd, model
- 2 October – Matt Hancock, Conservative politician
- 3 October – Christian Coulson, actor
- 5 October – Mark Gower, English footballer
- 6 October – Ricky Hatton, boxer (died 2025)
- 7 October
  - Alison Balsom, classical trumpeter
  - Jake Humphrey, television presenter
- 14 October – Paul Hunter, snooker player (died 2006)
- 20 October – Anthony Taylor, football referee
- 25 October – Russell Anderson, footballer
- 26 October – Jimmy Aggrey, footballer
- 10 November – Ruth Davidson, politician
- 18 November – Damien Johnson, footballer
- 19 November – Paul Anderson, actor
- 6 December – Jack Thorne, screenwriter and playwright
- 7 December – Suzannah Lipscomb, historian
- 7 December - Dr Ali Smith, Material Scientist
- 16 December – Joe Absolom, actor
- 23 December – Jodie Marsh, model
- 27 December – Simon Case, civil servant
- 29 December
  - Jake Berry, politician
  - Kieron Dyer, football player and manager

== Deaths ==
- 14 January – Harold Abrahams, athlete (born 1899)
- 18 January – Walter H. Thompson, Scotland Yard detective, bodyguard of Winston Churchill (born 1890)
- 22 January – Herbert Sutcliffe, cricketer (born 1894)
- 24 February – Mrs Mills (Gladys Mills), pianist (born 1918)
- 1 March – Paul Scott, novelist, playwright and poet (born 1920)
- 4 April – Sir Morien Morgan, aeronautics engineer (born 1912)
- 9 April – Sir Clough Williams-Ellis, architect (born 1883)
- 21 April – Sandy Denny, singer (born 1947)
- 11 May – Philip Ray, actor (born 1898)
- 16 May – Diana Hay, 23rd Countess of Erroll, noblewoman (born 1926 in Kenya)
- 18 May – Selwyn Lloyd, politician (born 1904)
- 7 June – Ronald George Wreyford Norrish, chemist, Nobel Prize laureate (born 1897)
- 23 July – Tommy McLaren, footballer (born 1949)
- 30 July – John Mackintosh, politician (born 1929)
- 31 July – Carleton Hobbs, actor (born 1898)
- 1 August – W. E. Butler, occultist (born 1898)
- 14 August
  - Nicolas Bentley, writer and illustrator (born 1907)
  - Norman Feather, nuclear physicist (born 1904)
- 19 August – Sir Max Mallowan, archaeologist, second husband of Agatha Christie (born 1904)
- 24 August – Dame Kathleen Kenyon, archaeologist of the Middle East and college principal (born 1906)
- 28 August – Robert Shaw, actor and novelist (born 1927)
- 4 September – Leonora Cohen, suffragette, trade unionist and feminist (born 1873)
- 7 September – Keith Moon, drummer (The Who) (drug overdose) (born 1946)
- 9 September – Hugh MacDiarmid, Scottish poet (born 1892)
- 13 September – George Beck, English Roman Catholic prelate, Archbishop of Liverpool (born 1904)
- 15 September – Edmund Crispin, writer and composer (born 1921)
- 17 October – Alison Chadwick-Onyszkiewicz, mountain climber (died on Annapurna) (born 1942)
- 28 October – Geoffrey Unsworth, cinematographer (born 1914)
- 8 November - Terence Mitford, archaeologist of the Near East (born 1905).
- 1 December – David Nixon, magician and television personality (born 1919)
- 23 December – Malcolm Caldwell, academic and writer (murdered) (born 1931)

== See also ==
- List of British films of 1978
