= Chris Thomas =

Chris Thomas may refer to:

- Chris Thomas (American football) (born 1971), former wide receiver in the NFL
- Chris Thomas (basketball player) (born 1982), former men's basketball player for the University of Notre Dame
- Chris Thomas (basketball coach) (born 1980), American basketball coach
- Chris Thomas (cricketer) (born 1959), English cricketer
- Chris Thomas (record producer) (born 1947), music producer
- Chris Thomas King (born 1962), American blues musician who debuted as Chris Thomas
- Christopher Thomas (1818–1879), American politician and lawyer
- Chris Thomas (Manx politician)
- Chris D. Thomas (born 1959), professor of biology
- Chris Thomas Devlin, American screenwriter
- Christopher Thomas (murderer) (born 1949), American mass murderer who killed 10 people in the 1984 Palm Sunday massacre

== See also ==
- Christian Thomas (disambiguation)
- Cris Thomas, American white hat hacker and cyber security researcher
- Kris Thomas (born 1984), singer
