= New Daisy Theatre =

Theater in Memphis, Tennessee, United States

Coordinates: 35.13945°N 90.050163°W

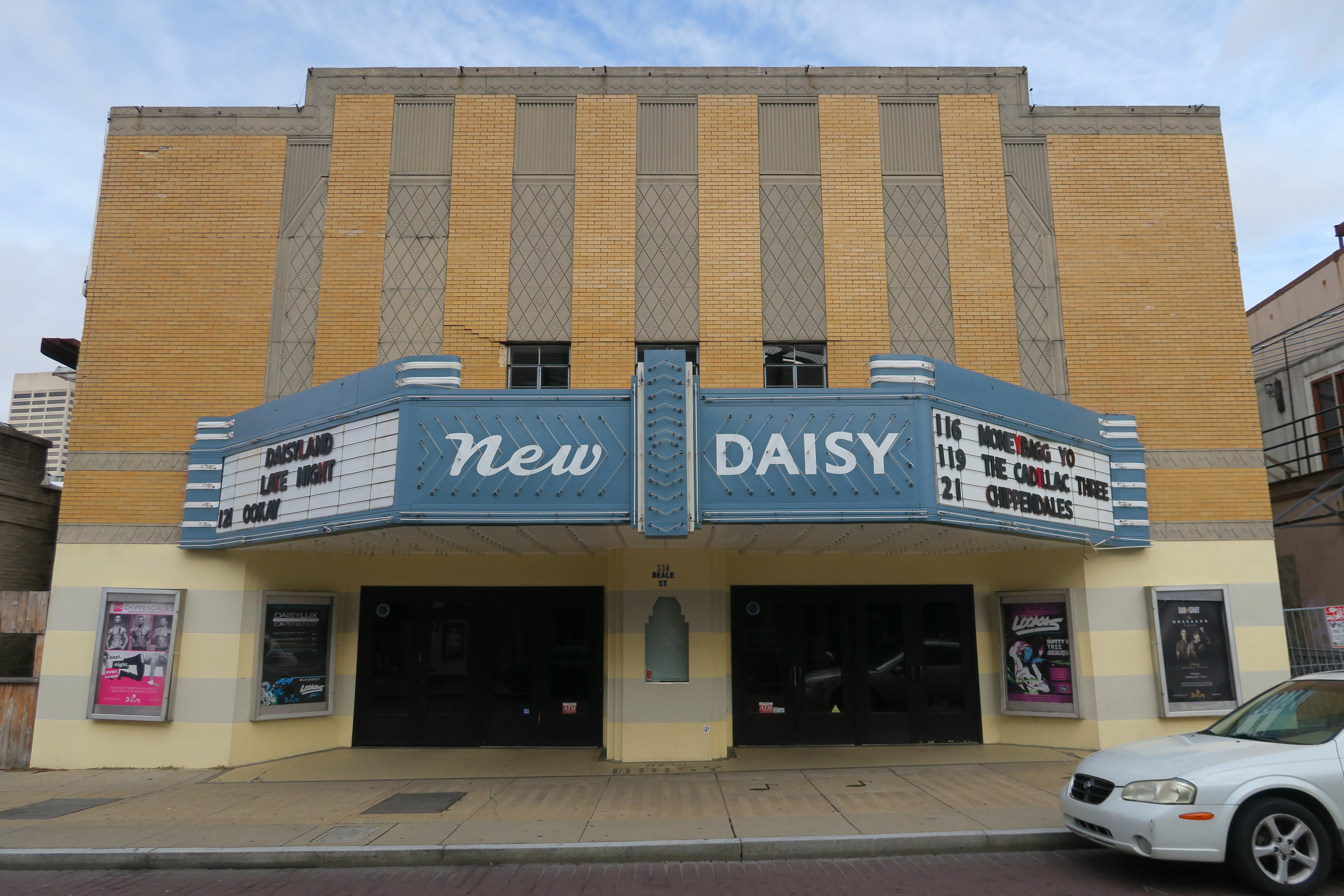
- Exterior view of the venue (c.2017)
- Interactive map of New Daisy Theatre
- Address: 330 Beale St; Memphis, Tennessee 38103-3131
- Location: Downtown Memphis
- Owner: Steve Adelman; J.W. Gibson II
- Operator: Live Nation
- Capacity: 1,083

Construction
- Renovated: 1982-83, 2015
- Closed: 1979-83
- Reopened: 1983

Website
- Venue Website
- New Daisy Theatre
- U.S. Historic district – Contributing property
- Architectural style: Streamline Moderne
- Part of: Beale Street Historic District (ID66000731)

The New Daisy Theatre is a music venue located on Beale Street in Memphis, Tennessee. It plays host to both local and national acts, as well the site of rental events.

The theater opened in 1936 and has featured artists such as John Lee Hooker, Gatemouth Brown, Jerry Lee Lewis, Al Green, Sam and Dave, Bob Dylan, Alex Chilton, the Cramps, Stevie Ray Vaughan, Phish, Kid Memphis, Son Lewis, Nirvana, Prince, Rufus Thomas, Justin Timberlake, Nelly, the Cult and Oasis, Ty Dolla $ign, J. Cole, Machine Gun Kelly, and All Time Low, among others.

Bob Dylan used the venue to record a video of a song from his Grammy-winning CD Time Out of Mind.

== History ==
In 1942, Paul and Sam Zerilla and their business partner, Joe Maceri, the owners of the original Daisy Theatre, opened the New Daisy Theatre at 330 Beale Street. The Zerillas and Maceri wanted to create a bigger performance space for popular acts.

In the first few decades after its opening, the New Daisy Theatre was primarily a movie theatre, but sometimes hosted live acts.

It had fallen into disrepair by the 1970s, and while several buildings around it were demolished, both the Old Daisy and New Daisy remained intact.

In the early 1980s, boxing promoter Mike Glenn began leasing the New Daisy and hosting matches. While boxing helped the theatre financially at the beginning, eventually Glenn began to host concerts, largely of rock music, which drew in more money than the boxing, although the latter continued. Glenn sold the New Daisy in November 2014, hosting John Hiatt as the last national act under his storied tenure.

In 2014, Steve Adelman and J.W. Gibson purchased the F.G.H. Corporation and the New Daisy Theatre, and in 2015 they invested $500,000 to renovate it. The renovation added a new floor, VIP areas, new bars, as well as new sound and lighting systems. Acts booked for the first two month included Seether, Drive-By Truckers, Joey Bada$$, Public Image Ltd., Everclear, and Steve Earle.

In 2019, Adelman was charged with writing a fraudulent check to former owner Mike Glenn. The charges were then dropped by police due to false claims. Adelman claimed that he intended to file a civil suit against Glenn "to address the wrongful conduct and hold parties accountable for their actions".

Spearheaded by Jon Shivers, with the Downtown Memphis Commission, The New Daisy Theatre reopened in 2023 and will again play host to local and national touring acts as well as corporate and private events.

== Notable performers ==
- Ike & Tina Turner - 1963
- Red Hot Chili Peppers - 1989
- Phish - 1991
- Alanis Morissette - 1995
- Tool - 1996
- Prince - 1997
- Bob Dylan - 1999
- They Might Be Giants - 2002
- Justin Timberlake - 2003
- Dierks Bentley - 2005
- Zac Brown Band - 2009
- Childish Gambino - 2011
- All Time Low - 2011
- Machine Gun Kelly - 2016
- J. Cole - 2017
- AJR - 2018
- Ty Dolla $ign - 2018
