= Nicholas Gilbert (disambiguation) =

Nicholas Gilbert (born 1963) is a former English cricketer.

Nicholas Gilbert or Nicolas Gilbert may also refer to:

- Nicolas Gilbert (born 1979), Canadian composer
- Nicolas Joseph Laurent Gilbert (1750–1780), French poet
- Nick Gilbert (born 1965), Canadian soccer player
- Nick Gilbert, original guitarist for the band Felt
