= Andy Lewis =

Andy Lewis may refer to:

== Entertainment ==
- Andy Lewis (bassist) (1967–2000), original bass guitarist with Australian group The Whitlams
- Andy Lewis (producer), English soul producer, best known for the album Billion Pound Project and his collaboration single with Paul Weller
- Andy Lewis (screenwriter) (1925–2018), American Academy Award-nominated screenwriter, best known for working on Klute
- Andy Lewis, guitarist of the Canadian Boys Night Out

== Sports ==
- Andy Lewis (slackliner) (1986–2026), American highliner and trickliner also known as Sketchy Andy
- Andy Lewis (cricketer) (born 1976), English cricketer
- Andy Lewis (triathlete) (born 1983), British paratriathlete

== See also ==
- Andrew Lewis (disambiguation)
