= Cundle =

Cundle is a surname. Notable people with the surname include:

- Greg Cundle (born 1997), English footballer
- John Cundle (born 1939), English cricketer
- Luke Cundle (born 2002), English footballer

== See also ==
- Cundletown, New South Wales, town
