= Vox (magazine) =

British music magazine from 1990 to 1998

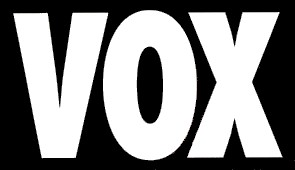
- Vox magazine logo
- Editor: Roy Carr
- Categories: Music tabloid
- Frequency: Monthly
- Publisher: IPC Media
- First issue: October 1990
- Final issue Number: June 1998; 92
- Country: United Kingdom
- Language: English
- ISSN: 0960-300X

Vox was a British music magazine, first issued in October 1990. It was published by IPC Media, and was later billed as a monthly sister-magazine to IPC's music weekly, the NME.

Although Vox was seen as IPC's response to EMAP's Q magazine, it was unable to match the circulation figures generated by Q in the 1990s and was closed in the late 1990s as IPC had launched Uncut. Even though Uncut was first established as an entertainment magazine targeting men aged 25 to 45 with a mixture of movies and music, it soon moved into the space vacated by Vox in the magazine marketplace, becoming more of a music magazine aimed at EMAP's rival Mojo (now published by the Bauer Media Group).

== See also ==
- Uncut magazine – published by IPC/TI Media/BandLab Technologies
- Later magazine – published by IPC (1999–2001)
- Mojo magazine – published by EMAP/Bauer
- Q magazine – published by EMAP/Bauer (1986–2020)
- Select magazine – published by EMAP/Bauer (1990–2001)
