= Scott Ruskin =

Scott Ruskin may refer to:

- Scott Ruskin (baseball) (born 1963), American baseball player
- Scott Ruskin (cricketer) (born 1975), English cricketer
