= Andrew Lewis =

Andrew Lewis may refer to:

== Law and politics ==
- Sir Andrew J. W. Lewis (1875-1952), Scottish businessman and politician; Lord Provost of Aberdeen
- Drew Lewis (Andrew L. Lewis Jr., 1931–2016), American railroad executive and US Secretary of Transportation
- Andrew Lewis (Pennsylvania politician) (born 1987), American politician in the Pennsylvania House of Representatives
- Andrew J. Lewis (politician) (born 1989), American politician on the Seattle City Council
- Andrew Lewis (professor), English legal scholar and professor at University College London

== Military ==
- Andrew Lewis (soldier) (1720–1781), American pioneer, surveyor, and soldier
- Andrew Lewis (Royal Navy officer) (1918–1994), British admiral
- Andrew L. Lewis (admiral) (born 1963), US Navy admiral

== Sports ==
- Andrew Lewis (boxer) (1970–2015), Guyanese boxer
- Andrew Lewis (rugby union) (born 1973), Welsh international rugby union player
- Andrew Lewis (soccer) (born 1974), American soccer player
- Andrew Lewis (racing driver) (born 1987), American racing driver
- Andrew Lewis (sailor) (born 1989), Trinidadian sailor
- Andrew Lewis (triathlete) (born 1983), British paratriathlete

== Others ==
- Andrew W. Lewis (1943–2017), American historian at Missouri State University
- Andrew Lewis (composer) (born 1963), British composer
- Andrew J. Lewis (comics), British comics writer
- Son Lewis (Andrew Lewis, born 1951), American blues singer and guitarist

== Other uses ==
- Andrew Lewis High School, Salem, Virginia

== See also ==
- Andy Lewis (disambiguation)
- Andre Lewis (disambiguation)
