= Andre Lewis =

Andre Lewis may refer to:

- Andre Lewis (musician) (1948–2012), American musician
- Andre Lewis (footballer) (born 1994), Jamaican footballer
- Andre Lewis, artistic director of the Royal Winnipeg Ballet

== See also ==
- Andrew Lewis (disambiguation)
