= Christian Thomas =

Christian Thomas may refer to:

- Christian Thomasius (1655–1728), German jurist and theologian
- Christian Thomas (long jumper) (born 1965), retired West German long jumper
- Christian Thomas (Danish gymnast) (1896–1970), Danish gymnast
- Christian Thomas (ice hockey) (born 1992), Canadian ice hockey player

== See also ==
- Saint Thomas Christians
- Chris Thomas (disambiguation)
- Kristian Thomas (born 1989), British gymnast
