= Alex Leigh =

English model

- Born: Alexandra Dallas Leigh; 2 October 1978 (age 48); Manchester, England
- Occupation: Fashion model

Alexandra Dallas Leigh (born October 1978) is an English fashion model. She was born in Manchester on 2 October 1978 and was formerly a waitress for William's Tavern. She went to school at Altrincham Grammar School for girls and speaks fluent Spanish, having lived there as a child.

Leigh started modelling at the age of 15. Many catwalk shows for well-known designers such as Betty Jackson, Tristan Webber, Jasper Conran, Dai Rees and Boudica have featured her. She has appeared as the cover model for Later, Shine, Vogue, Elle, Harper's, and Condé Nast Traveler and has been photographed by prestigious photographers like Rankin, Tony McGee and John Swannell. She stars in the Lynx TV fragrance adverts. She also was ranked amongst FHM's 100 Sexiest Women at No.93 in 2002. She writes a monthly column for Cheshire's LivingEDGE magazine. She appeared on Come Dine with Me, series 25, episodes 91–95, hosting episode 91.
