= David Lowe (cricketer) =

English cricketer

Personal information
- Full name: David Lowe
- Born: 12 January 1979 (age 47); Harlow, Essex, England
- Batting: Right-handed
- Relatives: Stephen Lowe (brother)

Domestic team information
- Years: Team
- 1999–2001: Hertfordshire

Career statistics
Competition	List A
Matches	3
Runs scored	18
Batting average	6.00
100s/50s	0/0
Top score	9
Catches/stumpings	0/–
- Source: Cricinfo, 9 May 2011

David Lowe (born 12 January 1979) is a former English cricketer. Lowe was a right-handed batsman. He was born in Harlow, Essex.

Lowe made his debut for Hertfordshire in the 1999 MCCA Knockout Trophy against the Surrey Cricket Board. Lowe played Minor counties cricket for Hertfordshire from 1999 to 2001, which included 8 Minor Counties Championship matches and 5 MCCA Knockout Trophy matches. In 2001, he made his List A debut against the Durham Cricket Board in the Cheltenham & Gloucester Trophy. He played 2 further List A matches for Hertfordshire, against Worcestershire in the 2nd round of the same competition and against Staffordshire in the 1st round of the 2002 Cheltenham & Gloucester Trophy which was held in 2001. In his 3 List A matches, he scored 18 runs at a batting average of 6.00 with a high score of 9.

His brother, Stephen Lowe, also played for Hertfordshire.
