= Len Stubbs =

English cricketer

Personal information
- Full name: Leonard George Stubbs
- Born: 24 October 1938 (age 88); Calcutta, Bengal Presidency, British Raj
- Batting: Right-handed

Domestic team information
- Years: Team
- 1967–1971: Hertfordshire

Career statistics
Competition	List A
Matches	3
Runs scored	32
Batting average	10.66
100s/50s	–/–
Top score	18
Balls bowled	–
Wickets	–
Bowling average	–
5 wickets in innings	–
10 wickets in match	–
Best bowling	–
Catches/stumpings	1/–
- Source: ESPNcricinfo, 5 September 2011

Leonard George Stubbs (born 24 October 1928) is a former English cricketer. Stubbs was a right-handed batsman. He was born in Calcutta, Bengal Presidency in the British Raj (today Kolkata, India).

Stubbs made his debut Hertfordshire in the 1967 Minor Counties Championship against Cambridgeshire. He played Minor counties cricket for Hertfordshire from 1967 to 1971, making 39 Minor Counties Championship appearances. He made his List A debut for the county against Devon in the 1969 Gillette Cup. He made two further List A appearances, against Glamorgan in the 2nd round of the same competition, and against Surrey in the 1st round of the 1971 Gillette Cup. In his three List A matches, he scored 32 runs at an average of 10.66, with a high score of 18.
