= Nicholas Wright (cricketer, born 1960) =

English cricketer

Personal information
- Full name: Nicholas Peter Gerrard Wright
- Born: 9 January 1960 (age 66); Mill Hill, Middlesex, England
- Batting: Left-handed
- Relatives: Martin Wright (brother)

Domestic team information
- Years: Team
- 1980–1997: Hertfordshire

Career statistics
Competition	List A
Matches	7
Runs scored	67
Batting average	9.57
100s/50s	0/0
Top score	17
Balls bowled	7
Wickets	1
Bowling average	11.00
5 wickets in innings	0
10 wickets in match	0
Best bowling	1/2
Catches/stumpings	0/–
- Source: Cricinfo, 6 June 2011

Nicholas Peter Gerrard Wright (born 9 January 1960) is a former English cricketer. Wright was a left-handed batsman, his bowling style is unknown. He was born in Mill Hill, Middlesex.

Wright made his debut for Hertfordshire in the 1980 Minor Counties Championship against Norfolk. Wright played Minor counties cricket for Hertfordshire from 1980 to 1997, which included 76 Minor Counties Championship matches and 21 MCCA Knockout Trophy matches. He made his List A debut against Hampshire in the 1983 NatWest Trophy. He made 6 further List A appearances for the county, the last coming against Warwickshire in the 1991 NatWest Trophy. In his 7 List A matches, he scored 67 runs at a batting average of 9.57, with a high score of 17. With the ball, he took a single wicket for the cost of 11 runs.

His brother, Martin, also played for Hertfordshire.
