= Wayne Osman =

English cricketer (born 1950)

Personal information
- Full name: Wayne Miles Osman
- Born: 19 August 1950 (age 76); Athens, Attica, Greece
- Batting: Left-handed
- Bowling: Left-arm medium

Domestic team information
- Years: Team
- 1982–1985: Minor Counties
- 1979: Minor Counties South
- 1978: Minor Counties West
- 1972–1986: Hertfordshire
- 1970–1971: Northamptonshire

Career statistics
Competition	First-class	List A
Matches	9	38
Runs scored	287	576
Batting average	17.93	16.45
100s/50s	–/1	–/2
Top score	60	62
Balls bowled	–	4
Wickets	–	–
Bowling average	–	–
5 wickets in innings	–	–
10 wickets in match	–	–
Best bowling	–	–
Catches/stumpings	6/–	9/–
- Source: Cricinfo, 5 September 2011

Wayne Miles Osman (born 19 August 1950) is a former English cricketer. Osman was a left-handed batsman who bowled left-arm medium pace. He was born in Athens, Greece.

Osman made his first-class debut for Northamptonshire against Cambridge University in 1970. He made eight further first-class appearances for the county, the last of which came against Gloucestershire in 1971 County Championship. In his nine first-class appearances, he scored 287 runs at an average of 17.93, with a high score of 60. This score, which was his only first-class fifty, came against Hampshire in 1971. He made his List A debut for Northamptonshire against Sussex in the 1971 John Player League. He made six further List A appearances for the county, the last of which came against Nottinghamshire in that same season. In these seven List A matches, he scored 224 runs at an average of 22.40, with a high score of 27.

Having left Northamptonshire at the end of the 1971 season, Osman proceeded to join Hertfordshire, who he made his debut for in the 1972 Minor Counties Championship against Suffolk. He played Minor counties cricket for Hertfordshire from 1972 to 1986, making 99 Minor Counties Championship appearances and 11 MCCA Knockout Trophy appearances. He made his List A debut for the county against Durham in the 1974 Gillette Cup. He made nine further List A appearances for the county, the last of which came against Hampshire in the 1986 NatWest Trophy. In his ten List A matches, he scored 224 runs at an average of 22.40, with a high score of 54. This score came against Leicestershire in the 1977 Gillette Cup.

He also played List A cricket for Minor Counties South and Minor Counties West. He four appearances Minor Counties West in the 1978 Benson & Hedges Cup and four appearances for Minor Counties South in the 1979 Benson & Hedges Cup. Further List A appearances came for the Minor Counties cricket team, who he first appeared for in the 1982 Benson & Hedges Cup against Yorkshire. He made twelve further List A appearances for the team, the last of which came against Hampshire in the 1985 Benson & Hedges Cup. In his thirteen appearances for the team, he scored 277 runs at an average of 21.43, with a high score of 53+against Derbyshire
