= Chris D. Thomas =

Christian David Thomas FRES FRS (born 9 September 1959) is a past president of the Royal Entomological Society. He has also served as Director of the Leverhulme Centre for Anthropocene Biodiversity at the University of York.

He completed his first degree (BA) in Applied Biology at the University of Cambridge, followed by an MSc in ecology at the University of Bangor and a PhD at the University of Texas at Austin. A professor in the Department of Biology at the University of York, he has also served as director of the Leverhulme Centre for Anthropocene Biodiversity until 2024, a new £10 million transdisciplinary research centre funded for 10 years from 2019. In July 2012, he was elected as a Fellow of the Royal Society.

== Selected publications ==
- Inheritors of the Earth: How Nature Is Thriving in an Age of Extinction. 2017. ISBN 978-0241240755
