= Nina Lawson =

Roberta Peters gets her wig styled by Nina Lawson at the Metropolitan Opera in 1983.

Nina Lawson (27 July 1926 – 9 September 2008) was a Scottish wigmaker who ran the Metropolitan Opera wig department from 1956 to 1987. She was responsible for cleaning up to 750 wigs a week in her early tenure, from every chorus member's wig to those of stars including Birgit Nilsson, Luciano Pavarotti, Joan Sutherland, Beverly Sills, and Plácido Domingo.

== Life and career ==
Lawson grew up in Forth, South Lanarkshire in Scotland, and attended Stowe Hairdressing College in Glasgow. She began her professional career as a theatrical hair-stylist at the Carl Rosa Opera Company in London. She then worked for the Sadler's Wells Opera and the Stratford Shakespeare Festival in Ontario, Canada. She was hired by Rudolf Bing, General Manager of the Metropolitan Opera, in October 1956 and left Stratford. The Met moved from renting wigs to purchasing a large inventory.

At the end of the 1987–88 Met season, Lawson retired to Ayr, Scotland. She died there of pernicious anemia on 9 September 2008, aged 82.
