= Martin Wright (cricketer, born 1963) =

English cricketer

Martin Wright (born 13 July 1963) was an English cricketer. He was a right-handed batsman who played for Hertfordshire. He was born in Hemel Hempstead.

Wright, who played for the team in the Minor Counties Championship between 1986 and 1997, made four List A appearances, in the NatWest Trophy competition between 1986 and 1989.

Wright's highest score in the competition came in 1989, when he scored 36 runs, the highest score of anyone on the Hertfordshire team, though this was not enough to prevent an exit in the first round of the competition at the hands of Nottinghamshire.

His brother, Nicholas, also played for Hertfordshire.
