= Simon White (cricketer) =

English cricketer

Personal information
- Full name: Simon Paul White
- Born: 4 December 1975 (age 50); St Albans, Hertfordshire, England
- Batting: Right-handed
- Bowling: Right-arm medium

Domestic team information
- Years: Team
- 1996–2015: Hertfordshire

Career statistics
Competition	List A
Matches	5
Runs scored	59
Batting average	14.75
100s/50s	0/0
Top score	31*
Balls bowled	264
Wickets	6
Bowling average	36.66
5 wickets in innings	0
10 wickets in match	0
Best bowling	2/32
Catches/stumpings	2/–
- Source: Cricinfo, 6 June 2011

Simon Paul White (born 4 December 1975) is an English cricketer. White is a right-handed batsman who bowls right-arm medium pace. He was born in St Albans, Hertfordshire.

White made his debut for Hertfordshire in the 1996 Minor Counties Championship against Cumberland. White has played Minor counties cricket for Hertfordshire from 1996 to 2015, which has included 81 Minor Counties Championship matches and 49 MCCA Knockout Trophy matches. In 2001, he made his List A debut against the Durham Cricket Board in the Cheltenham & Gloucester Trophy. He made 4 further List A appearances for the county, the last coming against Ireland in the 1st round of the 2004 Cheltenham & Gloucester Trophy, which was held in 2003. In his 5 List A matches, he scored 59 runs at a batting average of 14.75, with a high score of 31 not out. With the ball, he took 6 wickets at a bowling average of 36.66, with best figures of 2/32.

Between 2008 and 2010 he played for Welwyn Garden City in the Home Counties Premier League, before to moving to Harpenden in 2010 and playing with them until 2013. In total, he played 95 matches in the Home Counties League. The Hertfordshire Cricket League was reformed in 2014 and White played 32 matches with Harpenden from 2015 to 2016.

Outside of cricket he works as a P.E. teacher.
