= Mark Everett (cricketer) =

English cricketer (born 1967)

Personal information
- Full name: Mark Andrew Everett
- Born: 11 November 1967 (age 59); Harlow, Essex, England
- Batting: Left-handed
- Bowling: Slow left-arm orthodox

Domestic team information
- Years: Team
- 1992–2002: Hertfordshire

Career statistics
Competition	List A
Matches	4
Runs scored	26
Batting average	6.50
100s/50s	0/0
Top score	14
Catches/stumpings	0/–
- Source: Cricinfo, 7 June 2011

Mark Andrew Everett (born 11 November 1967) is a former English cricketer. Everett was a left-handed batsman who bowled slow left-arm orthodox. He was born in Harlow, Essex.

Everett made his debut for Hertfordshire in the 1992 MCCA Knockout Trophy against Oxfordshire. Everett played Minor counties cricket for Hertfordshire from 1992 to 2002, which included 39 Minor Counties Championship matches and 13 MCCA Knockout Trophy matches. He made his List A debut against the Sussex Cricket Board in the 1999 NatWest Trophy. He made 3 further List A appearances for the county, the last coming against Bedfordshire in the 1st round of the 2003 Cheltenham & Gloucester Trophy which was held in 2002. In his 4 List A matches, he scored 26 runs at an average of 6.50, with a high score of 14.
