= Luke O'Reilly (cricketer) =

English cricketer (born 1977)

Luke O'Reilly (born 9 July 1977) is an English cricketer. He was a right-handed batsman and right-arm medium-fast bowler who played for Hertfordshire. He was born in Westminster.

O'Reilly, who played two matches for Middlesex Second XI in the 1998 AON Risks Trophy, made four List A appearances between 1999 and 2001. Despite bowling for 30 overs, he never made an appearance as a batsman.

O'Reilly made one further C&G Trophy appearance, in 2001 for Middlesex CB.

As of 2008, O'Reilly still plays cricket in the Essex Cricket League for Woodford Wells, alongside such names as former Essex player Robert Leiper.
