= Stephen Lowe (cricketer) =

English cricketer

Personal information
- Full name: Stephen James Lowe
- Born: 7 May 1981 (age 45); Stevenage, Hertfordshire, England
- Batting: Left-handed
- Bowling: Leg break
- Role: Wicket-keeper
- Relatives: David Lowe (brother)

Domestic team information
- Years: Team
- 1999–2006: Hertfordshire
- 2003: Oxford UCCE

Career statistics
Competition	First-class	List A
Matches	2	2
Runs scored	59	5
Batting average	19.66	2.50
100s/50s	0/0	0/0
Top score	38	5
Catches/stumpings	5/2	5/1
- Source: Cricinfo, 6 June 2011

Stephen James Lowe (born 7 May 1981) is an English cricketer. Lowe is a left-handed batsman who bowls leg break, although he plays primarily as a wicket-keeper. He was born in Stevenage, Hertfordshire. Lowe's brother, David, has also played cricket for Hertfordshire.

Lowe made his debut for Hertfordshire in the 1999 Minor Counties Championship against Cambridgeshire. Lowe played Minor counties cricket for Hertfordshire from 1999 to 2006, which included 29 Minor Counties Championship matches and 15 MCCA Knockout Trophy matches. In 2001, he played 2 List A matches against the Durham Cricket Board and Worcestershire, both in the Cheltenham & Gloucester Trophy. In these 2 matches, he scored 5 runs at an average of 2.50. Behind the stumps he took 5 catches and made 2 stumpings.

Lowe also played first-class cricket, making 2 appearances for Oxford UCCE in 2003 against Middlesex and Hampshire. In these 2 matches, he scored 59 runs at an average of 19.66, with a high score of 38. Behind the stumps he took 5 catches and made 2 stumpings.
