= Jamie Murch =

Australian cricketer

James Clifford Thomas Murch (born 8 August 1975) is a former Australian cricketer. He was a right-handed batsman and right-arm medium-fast bowler who played for Hertfordshire. He was born in Melbourne.

Murch made a single appearance for the team, during the C&G Trophy in August 2003. From the middle order, he scored 24 runs with the bat, and took figures of 0–67 with the ball.

He is the son of first-class cricketer Nigel Murch. In 2009, he married Australian athlete Cathy Freeman.
