= Ronnie Kotkamp =

New Zealand cricketer

Personal information
- Full name: Ronald Kotkamp
- Born: 15 April 1972 (age 54); Dunedin, Otago, New Zealand
- Batting: Right-handed
- Bowling: Right-arm fast-medium

Domestic team information
- Years: Team
- 2002: Hertfordshire

Career statistics
| Competition | List A |
|---|---|
| Matches | 1 |
| Runs scored | 5 |
| Batting average | 5.00 |
| 100s/50s | –/– |
| Top score | 5 |
| Balls bowled | 42 |
| Wickets | 1 |
| Bowling average | 39.00 |
| 5 wickets in innings | – |
| 10 wickets in match | – |
| Best bowling | 1/39 |
| Catches/stumpings | –/– |
- Source: CricketArchive, 7 April 2011

Ronald Kotkamp (born 15 April 1972) is a former New Zealand cricketer. Kotkamp was a right-handed batsman who bowled right-arm fast-medium. He was born in Dunedin, Otago.

Kotkamp made his debut for Hertfordshire in the 2002 MCCA Knockout Trophy against the Essex Cricket Board, in what was his only Knockout Trophy match for the county. In that same season he made his only List A appearance against Bedfordshire in the 1st round of the 2003 Cheltenham & Gloucester Trophy which was held in 2002. In this match he scored 5 runs before being dismissed by Shaun Young, while with the ball he took the wicket of Neil Stanley for the cost of 39 runs.

As of 2010, he was back in New Zealand playing club cricket for Otago Country.
