= Roger Smith (footballer, born 1944) =

English footballer

Personal information
- Full name: Roger Anthony Smith
- Date of birth: 3 November 1944 (age 81)
- Place of birth: Welwyn Garden City, England
- Position: Winger

Senior career*
Years	Team	Apps	(Gls)
1962–1966	Tottenham Hotspur	0	(0)
1966–1967	Exeter City	6	(3)
1967–19??	Ashford Town (Kent)		
- * Club domestic league appearances and goals

Roger Anthony Smith (born 3 November 1944) is an English former professional footballer who played as a winger in the Football League for Exeter City in the 1960s.

== Statistics ==
Club	Season	Division	League		FA Cup		Other		Total	
Club	Season	Division	Apps	Goals	Apps	Goals	Apps	Goals	Apps	Goals
Tottenham Hotspur	1962–63	First Division	0	0	0	0	0	0	0	0
Exeter City	1966–67	Fourth Division	6	3	0	0	1	0	7	3
Career total			6	3	0	0	1	0	7	3
