= Tom Cranston (cricketer) =

English cricketer

Personal information
- Full name: Thomas Paul Cranston
- Born: 21 November 1983 (age 42); Aylesbury, Buckinghamshire, England
- Batting: Right-handed
- Bowling: Right-arm medium

Domestic team information
- Years: Team
- 2001–2002: Hertfordshire

Career statistics
Competition	List A
Matches	1
Runs scored	18
Batting average	18.00
100s/50s	–/–
Top score	18
Catches/stumpings	2/–
- Source: Cricinfo, 7 July 2019

Thomas Paul Cranston (born 21 November 1983) is an English former cricketer.

Cranston was born at Aylesbury in November 1983. He made his debut for Hertfordshire in a List A one-day match against Staffordshire at Welwyn Garden City in the 1st round of the 2002 Cheltenham & Gloucester Trophy (played in August 2001). Batting at number three, he was dismissed by Richard Cooper for 18 runs. The following year he made his debut in minor counties cricket for Hertfordshire, making three appearances in the Minor Counties Championship and two appearances in the MCCA Knockout Trophy.
