= Scott Ruskin (cricketer) =

English cricketer

Scott Ruskin (born 12 January 1975) is an English cricketer. He is a right-handed batsman and right-arm medium-fast bowler who played for Hertfordshire. He was born in Hertford.

Ruskin, who made his debut for the team in the 2000 Minor counties Championship, played in two C&G Trophy matches, during the 2001 season. From the tailend, he finished on 8 not out on his debut, and in his second match, a month later, he scored 6 runs.

As of 2008, Ruskin still plays for Hertford Cricket Club in the Evening Standard Challenge Trophy.
