= Nicholas Gilbert =

English cricketer (born 1963)

Personal information
- Born: 14 June 1963 (age 63); East Ham, Essex, England
- Batting: Right-handed

Domestic team information
- Years: Team
- 1983–1999: Hertfordshire

Career statistics
Competition	List A
Matches	7
Runs scored	79
Batting average	15.80
100s/50s	0/0
Top score	33
Catches/stumpings	1/–
- Source: Cricinfo, 6 June 2011

Nicholas Gilbert (born 14 June 1963) is a former English cricketer. Gilbert was a right-handed batsman. He was born in East Ham, Essex.

== Career ==
Gilbert made his debut for Hertfordshire in the 1983 Minor Counties Championship against Norfolk. Gilbert played Minor counties cricket for Hertfordshire from 1983 to 1999, which included 50 Minor Counties Championship matches and 18 MCCA Knockout Trophy matches. He made his List A debut against Somerset in the 1984 NatWest Trophy. He made 6 further List A appearances for the county, the last coming against Lancashire in the 1999 NatWest Trophy. In his 7 List A matches, he scored 79 runs at an average of 15.80, with a high score of 33.

In 1982, he played for the Second XIs of Northamptonshire, Sussex, Derbyshire and Nottinghamshire.
