= Stephen Dean =

English cricketer (born 1964)

Personal information
- Full name: Stephen Anthony Dean
- Born: 15 May 1964 (age 62); Welwyn Garden City, Hertfordshire, England
- Batting: Right-handed

Domestic team information
- Years: Team
- 1983–1988: Hertfordshire

Career statistics
Competition	List A
Matches	3
Runs scored	54
Batting average	18.00
100s/50s	0/0
Top score	42
Catches/stumpings	0/–
- Source: Cricinfo, 6 June 2011

Stephen Anthony Dean (born 15 May 1964) is a former English cricketer. Dean was a right-handed batsman. He was born in Welwyn Garden City, Hertfordshire.

Dean made his debut for Hertfordshire in the 1980 Minor Counties Championship against Norfolk and played Minor counties cricket for Hertfordshire from 1983 to 1988, which included 35 Minor Counties Championship matches and 5 MCCA Knockout Trophy matches. He made his List A debut against Hampshire in the 1983 NatWest Trophy. He made 2 further List A appearances for the county, against Hampshire in the 1986 NatWest Trophy and Surrey in the 1987 NatWest Trophy. In his 3 List A matches, he scored 54 runs at a batting average of 18.00, with a high score of 42.
