= Later (magazine) =

Defunct British men's magazine

- Deputy editor: Sam Delaney
- Categories: Men's magazine
- Frequency: Monthly
- Publisher: IPC Media
- Founded: 1999
- Final issue: 2001
- Country: United Kingdom
- Language: British English

Later was a monthly men's magazine (and "British lad magazine") published by IPC Media from April 1999 to early 2001.

== History and profile ==
Later was established in 1999. In an interview with Sam Delaney (who was deputy editor of Later in 2001 when he was 24 years old) in Heat magazine, "Later [was] designed to be Loaded for settled men in their 30s".

Later was a relatively short-lived UK monthly men's magazine (and "British lad magazine") published by IPC Media from April 1999 to early 2001. Later was established in 1999. In an interview with Sam Delaney that appeared in Heat magazine, (Delaney was deputy editor of Later in 2001 when he was 24 years old) Delaney said "Later [was] designed to be Loaded for settled men in their 30s". As a settled man in my 30s when I bought these magazines I can assert to the truth of that comment.

The UK band Madness was interviewed in the September 1999 issue.

In October 1999, Later featured an article on Tiswas, a 1974-1982 UK children's television series.

In January 2000, Mid Night Club, a Japanese street racing gang, was featured in an article by Andy Wilman.

In April 2000, "the editor of Later magazine had declared fatherhood 'the new rock 'n' roll'" and "better known for showing men how to nurse their pints than their kids, supplemented its usual fare (scantily clad models, gizmos, booze, fighting and sports) with a section called 'Dad.' In an earnest attempt to meld adolescent recklessness and adult responsibility, its pages have included reviews of the toys a man can 'enjoy' with his children (Action Man figures, super-soakers and remote-control racing cars) as well as advice on whether children should 'know Daddy's drunk' or whether he should 'pretend to be a normal sober human being.'"

In December 2000, Later had an article on martial arts, commenting "Wing Chun is the close protection bodyguards choice."

== Covers ==
- Pernille Holmboe, April 1999 (Issue 1): Pernille Holmboe (born 2 May 1977 in Bærum, Norway) is a Norwegian model widely known as the face of the Swedish clothing company Gina Tricot with whom she had a long-running contract that was terminated in 2010. She is especially known for this among Norwegians, to whom she has been "synonymous" with the brand.
- Caterina Murino, October 1999: Caterina Murino (born 15 September 1977) is an Italian actress. She began her acting career in the 1999 production of the play Richard III and later made her breakthrough with the 2004 film The Corsican File. She went on to appear in the 2006 film Casino Royale and received a European Golden Globe at the 2008 Italian Golden Globe Awards.
- Julienne Davis, November 1999: Julienne Davis (born 1973) is an American actress, singer, and model. She was born in Los Angeles, California. Davis was born on September 26, 1973, in Los Angeles. When she was seventeen, she left home to pursue a career in classical ballet in New York but after finding she was too tall to audition for corps de ballet she decided to become a fashion model instead. She is half Yankton Sioux.
- Elle Macpherson, January 2000: Eleanor Nancy Macpherson née Gow; born 1964) is an Australian model, businesswoman, television host and actress. She is known for her record five cover appearances for the Sports Illustrated Swimsuit Issue beginning in the 1980s, leading to her nickname "The Body", coined by Time in 1989. She is the founder, primary model, and creative director for a series of business ventures, including Elle Macpherson Intimates, a lingerie line, and The Body, a line of skin care products. She has been the host and executive producer of Britain & Ireland's Next Top Model from 2010 to 2013. She is an executive producer of NBC's Fashion Star and the host for the first season.

- Kristy Swanson, March 2000: Kristen Noel Swanson (born December 19, 1969) is an American actress. She is best recognised for having played Buffy Summers in the 1992 film Buffy the Vampire Slayer and appeared in the 1996 film The Phantom.

- Bob Mortimer, April 2000: Robert Renwick Mortimer (born 23 May 1959) is an English comedian and actor. He is known for his work with Vic Reeves as part of their Vic and Bob comedy double act.

- Jenny McCarthy, May 2000: Jennifer McCarthy Wahlberg (née Jennifer Ann McCarthy; born November 1, 1972) is an American actress, model, television host, satellite radio broadcaster, author, and anti-vaccine activist. She began her career in 1993 as a nude model for Playboy magazine and was later named their Playmate of the Year. McCarthy then had a television and film acting career, starting as a co-host on the MTV game show Singled Out, then some eponymous sitcoms, as well as films such as BASEketball, Diamonds, Scream 3, and Santa Baby. She is a former co-host of the ABC talk show The View. She is currently a judge on the Fox musical competition show The Masked Singer.

Ulrika Jonsson, July 2000: Eva Ulrika Jonsson (born 16 August 1967) is a United Kingdom-based Swedish television presenter and model. She became known as a TV-am weather presenter, moved on to present the ITV show Gladiators, and as a team captain of the BBC Two show Shooting Stars.

Pamela Anderson, August 2000: Pamela Denise Anderson (born July 1, 1967) is a Canadian-American model, actress, activist, television personality, and author. She is best known for her numerous appearances in Playboy magazine and for her work on the television series Home Improvement (1991–1997), Baywatch (1992–1998), and V.I.P. (1998–2002).

Mena Suvari, September 2000: Mena Alexandra Suvari born February 13, 1979) is an American actress, fashion designer, and model. After beginning her career as a model and guest-starring in several television series, she made her film debut in the drama Nowhere (1997). Suvari rose to international prominence for her roles in the 1999 film American Beauty, for which she received a BAFTA Award nomination for Best Supporting Actress, and in three of the American Pie original films (1999–2001, 2012).

- Lisa Snowdon, November 2000: Lisa Snowdon (born Lisa Snawdon on 23 January 1972) is an English television and radio presenter and fashion model. She was the host of the Living TV reality television show Britain's Next Top Model from 2006 until 2009. She also co-presented Capital Breakfast on Capital London from August 2008 until 18 December 2015.
- Caprice Bourret, December 2000: Caprice Bourret (born October 24, 1971) is an American businesswoman, model, actress, television personality. She lives in London where she runs her company, By Caprice. She attended Bishop Amat Highschool in La Puente, CA and graduated class of 1989.
- Lara Weller (former Lara Croft model), February 2001

Model Stampede, February 2001: Models: Cressida Wilson, Sophie Western, Daniella Lloyd, Alex Leigh, Tabitha Scanes, Lara Weller. Daniella Lloyd, aka Danielle Lloyd; Danielle O’Neill (formerly O'Hara; born 16 December 1983) is an English glamour model and television personality. A former Miss England (2004) and Miss Great Britain (2006), she first rose to prominence when she was stripped of her Miss Great Britain title after posing nude in the December 2006 edition of Playboy magazine. Her title was reinstated in 2010. In January 2007 she appeared on Celebrity Big Brother. She won the celebrity edition of The Weakest Link in 2008 and Total Wipeout in 2010. Lara Weller, (former Lara Croft model), February 2001: Lara Weller was born on April 6, 1975, in Rotterdam, Zuid-Holland, Netherlands. She is an actress, known for Compañeros (1998), 10 Years of Tomb Raider: A GameTap Retrospective (2008) and Lara Croft: Lethal and Loaded (2001).

- Nell McAndrew, March 2001: Tracey Jane McAndrew (born 6 November 1973), known as Nell McAndrew, is an English glamour model. She is also an accomplished amateur athlete, with a marathon personal best time of 2:54:39.

- Tara Palmer-Tomkinson, May 2001: Tara Claire Palmer-Tomkinson (23 December 1971 – 8 February 2017), also known as T P-T, was an English socialite and television personality. She appeared in several television shows, including the reality programme I'm a Celebrity...Get Me Out of Here!. In 2016 she was diagnosed with a pituitary tumour and an autoimmune condition. She died from a perforated ulcer on 8 February 2017.
- Virag Kiss, June 2001: Virág Magdolna Kiss is a Hungarian actor, born: 12 June 1972, Budapest, Hungary.
- Suzi Perry, July 2001: Suzi Perry (born 3 May 1970) in an RAF hospital in Cosford, Shropshire, is the daughter of a music promoter, her godfather was guitarist Mel Galley. Perry is an English television presenter, currently covering MotoGP for BT Sport. She is best known for covering MotoGP for the BBC for 13 years, The Gadget Show on Channel 5 for 9 years and the BBC's Formula One coverage from 2013 to 2015.

== Music ==
Later released several compilation albums. Serve Chilled featured tracks by Groove Armada and A Man Called Adam and The Later Lounge 1 and 2 in 2001. The Later Lounge 2 featured the debut single "Sea Groove" from Big Boss Man.
