= Laurie Clough =

English cricketer

Personal information
- Full name: Thomas Lawson Clough
- Born: 1 January 1926; Lynesack, County Durham, England
- Died: April 2008 (aged 82)
- Batting: Right-handed
- Role: Occasional wicket-keeper

Domestic team information
- Years: Team
- 1954–1971: Hertfordshire

Career statistics
Competition	List A
Matches	5
Runs scored	112
Batting average	22.40
100s/50s	–/–
Top score	47
Balls bowled	–
Wickets	–
Bowling average	–
5 wickets in innings	–
10 wickets in match	–
Best bowling	–
Catches/stumpings	1/–
- Source: Cricinfo, 5 September 2011

Thomas Lawson Clough (1 January 1926 – April 2008) was an English cricketer. Clough was a right-handed batsman who fielded occasionally as a wicket-keeper. He was born in Lynesack, County Durham and known by his nickname Laurie.

Clough made his debut Hertfordshire in the 1954 Minor Counties Championship against Cambridgeshire. He played Minor counties cricket for Hertfordshire from 1954 to 1971, making 89 Minor Counties Championship appearances. He made his List A debut for the county against Durham in the 1964 Gillette Cup. He made four further List A appearances for the county, the last of which came against Surrey in the 1971 Gillette Cup. In his five List A matches, he scored 112 runs at an average of 22.40, with a high score of 47.

He died in April 2008.
