= Neil Gladwin =

English cricketer

Neil Gladwin (born 23 August 1978) was an English cricketer. He was a right-handed batsman and wicket-keeper who played for Hertfordshire. He was born in Harlow.

Gladwin, who made his debut for Hertfordshire in the 1999 38-County Cup, made a single List A appearance, in 2001, in the C&G Trophy. From the middle order, he scored 8 runs and took one stumping.

Gladwin joined Saffron Walden in 2002 for whom he played until 2013. Having played two matches for Marylebone Cricket Club in 2014, he joined Harlow Town in the same season, for whom he still plays as of 2017.
