= Chris Thomas (cricketer) =

English cricketer (born 1959)

Chris Thomas (born 26 May 1959) was an English cricketer. He was a right-handed batsman and left-arm slow bowler who played for Hertfordshire. He was born in Billingham, County Durham.

Thomas, who represented Durham in the Minor Counties Championship between 1977 and 1981, before moving to Hertfordshire in 1983, made a single List A appearance for his second team, in 1983, against Cheshire. From the upper-middle order, he scored 11 runs.

Thomas' son, Matthew, has played for Norton in the North East Premier League since 2006. He captained Norton 1st team and led them to victory in the NYSD Division 1 & 2. Matthew finally got to play with his childhood hero Ryan Sidebottom in 2021.

Thomas' middle son, James, also plays for Norton. He is the opening bowler for the second team and plays for the first team. He is a quick bowler, with his best figures of 6–7 off 7 overs in the 2009/2010 season.

Thomas' third son Nick is also a cricketer, known for his batting and off spin bowling. Nick currently plays for his local college and for Norton, just as his brother had done.
