= Neil MacLaurin =

English cricketer

Personal information
- Full name: Neil Ralph Charter MacLaurin
- Born: 22 March 1966 (age 60); Welwyn Garden City, Hertfordshire, England
- Batting: Right-handed
- Bowling: Right-arm medium
- Relatives: Ian MacLaurin (father)

Domestic team information
- Years: Team
- 1989–1992: Hertfordshire
- 1986–1988: Middlesex

Career statistics
Competition	First-class	List A
Matches	1	8
Runs scored	37	65
Batting average	18.50	10.83
100s/50s	–/–	–/–
Top score	35	21
Balls bowled	6	12
Wickets	–	–
Bowling average	–	–
5 wickets in innings	–	–
10 wickets in match	–	–
Best bowling	–	–
Catches/stumpings	–/–	2/–
- Source: Cricinfo, 1 October 2011

Neil Ralph Charter MacLaurin (born 22 March 1966) is a former English cricketer. MacLaurin was a right-handed batsman who bowled right-arm medium pace. The son of Ian MacLaurin, Baron MacLaurin of Knebworth, a businessman and former chairman of the England and Wales Cricket Board, MacLaurin was born at Welwyn Garden City, Hertfordshire and educated at Malvern College.

MacLaurin made his debut for Middlesex in a List A match against Leicestershire in the 1986 John Player Special League. He made four further List A appearances for Middlesex, the last of which came against Northamptonshire in the 1988 Refuge Assurance League. In his five List A appearances for the county, he scored 20 runs at an average of 6.66, with a high score of 15 not out. He also made a single first-class appearance for Middlesex against Cambridge University in 1988. In this match, he scored 2 runs in Middlesex's first-innings, before being dismissed by Nigel Fenton, while in their second-innings he scored 35 runs, before being dismissed by the same bowler. He left Middlesex at the end of the 1988 season.

He joined Hertfordshire for the 1989 season, making his debut for the county in the MCCA Knockout Trophy against Buckinghamshire. He played Minor counties cricket for Hertfordshire from 1989 to 1992, making 21 Minor Counties Championship and eleven MCCA Knockout Trophy appearances. His first List A appearance for Hertfordshire came in the 1989 NatWest Trophy against Nottinghamshire. He made two further List A appearances for the county, against Warwickshire in the 1990 NatWest Trophy and against the same opponents in the 1991 NatWest Trophy. In his three matches, he scored 45 runs at an average of 15.00, with a high score of 21.
