= Tom Pearman =

English cricketer

Tom Pearman (born 9 January 1979) was an English cricketer. He was a right-handed batsman and wicket-keeper who played for Hertfordshire. He was born in Welwyn Garden City.

Pearman, who made his Hertfordshire debut in 2000 against Oxford Universities, and who played in the Minor Counties Championship between 2002 and 2004, made a single List A appearance for the team, in the C&G Trophy in August 2003, against Ireland.

From the tail end, Pearman scored 4 not out, and despite a century from Gary Butcher, the game finished in a defeat for Hertfordshire.
