= Son Lewis =

American songwriter

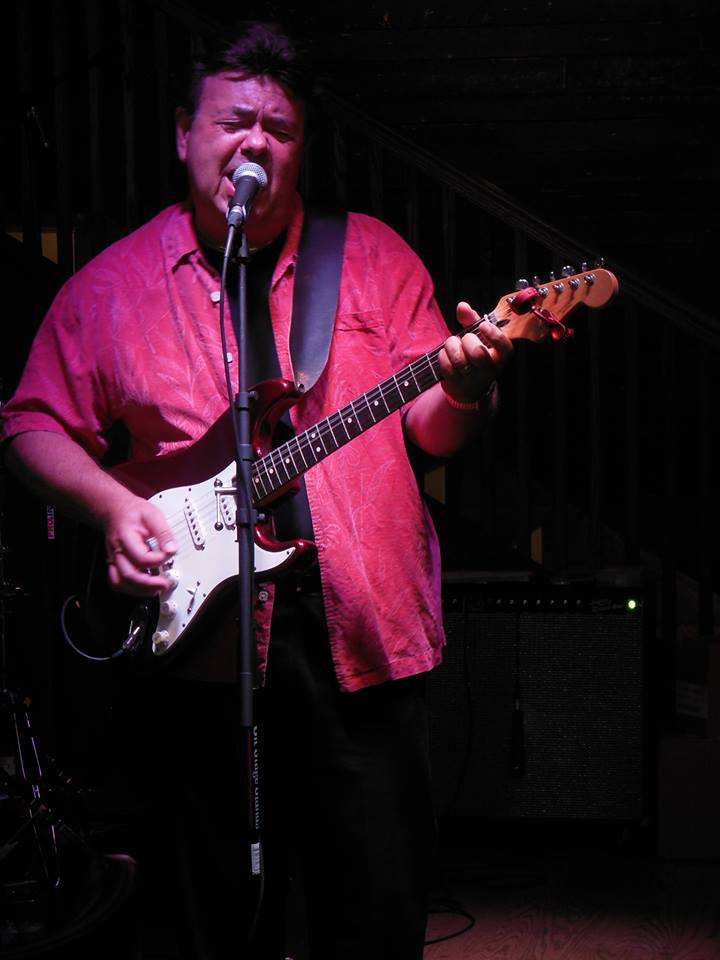
- photo by Barb Miears – Used with permission of performer.

Background information
- Born: Andrew Lewis; December 11, 1951 (age 74); Paterson, New Jersey, United States
- Genres: Electric blues, rhythm and blues
- Occupations: Guitarist, singer, songwriter
- Instruments: Electric and Acoustic Guitar, vocals
- Years active: Early 1970s–present
- Label: Silk City Records
- Website: Official website

Son Lewis (born Andrew Lewis, December 11, 1951, Paterson, New Jersey) is an American blues singer and guitarist. He was nicknamed "Son" or "Sonny" by his family, to differentiate him from his father, Andrew Lewis Sr.

== Family ==
He is the son of former soldier and businessman Andrew Lewis Sr. (whose photo is used on Lewis' "Dignified" CD cover) and his wife, Frances Frano. He has one sister, Michele.

== Career ==
Although not coming from a musical family, he was influenced by his cousin Carl Lewis, who exposed him to Delta and Chicago blues at a very young age. Lewis started playing guitar in 1964, studying under the R&B guitarist Dennis Gorgas, and later with Danny Kalb, founder and leader of The Blues Project. During that time, Lewis performed with The Avlons (on bass guitar) and fronted The Strangers and The Love Merchants (vocals and rhythm guitar) performing covers of "Blue-eyed Soul", Motown and STAX hits. By late 1968, Lewis had begun visiting the folk and blues clubs of New York City's Greenwich Village. After witnessing a performance by John P. Hammond at Gerde's Folk City, he was determined to begin performing as a solo acoustic performer. In early 1969, Lewis became a regular fixture at "open mics" and "hootenanys" in and around the New York/New Jersey area, singing and playing acoustic blues guitar in the Delta and Piedmont styles. These performances resulted in several paid gigs as an opening or support act at The Coffeehouse at Fairleigh Dickenson University in New Jersey. During that period, Lewis opened shows for The Manhattan Transfer (when they were a folk group), comedian Chris Rush, Melissa Manchester, J.F. Murphy and Free Flowing Salt.

In 1974, Lewis re-incorporated electric guitar into his repertoire and shortly thereafter formed The Son Lewis Blues Band, which has featured members of Mink DeVille, Exuma, Rockett 88, Impact and The Ricki Lee Jones Band.

Since 1979, he has appeared on numerous albums, primarily for New Jersey's Silk City Records and has appeared on numerous compilation albums. In 1996, he was selected by The Skyland Blues Society to represent Northern New Jersey in the 'International Blues Competition', held by the Blues Foundation in Memphis, Tennessee. He has also appeared on a number of local television programs and has over 25 live radio broadcasts to his credit.

== Songwriter ==
Long considered "an interpreter", Lewis originally wrote ballads in the late 1960s but refused to perform them in his live performances. He began writing blues and roots-based songs again in 2001, and now focuses extensively on original material for his recorded works. His CD Cadillac Rhythm, released in 2008, featured all original songs written by Lewis, or co-written with his keyboardist John Pittas. Lewis' original material was again featured prominently in his 2011 recording "Laws of Nature". Lewis has also returned to writing in other genres outside of Blues and his instrumental song "For Skylar" has been used by several broadcast radio stations as a music bed for public service announcements.

== Movie scores ==
Son Lewis contributed 19 original jazz compositions to Director Mike Lordi for use in the 2013 independent film Love in a Coffeeshop and four Blues tunes for Lordi's 2011 film The Big Weekend. He has also contributed numerous pieces for television, radio and internet advertisements.

== Narrations, voice overs and stage ==
Lewis has performed on the stage, appearing in John Brown's Body (as Clay Wingate), Thurber Carnival and Oh Dad, Poor Dad. He has done voice overs for various commercial advertising agencies as well as lent his voice to "The Laughing Bunny" Easter Toy. In the 1970s and 1980s, he narrated a number of Classic "Books on Tape", including works by James Fenimore Cooper (as Natty Bumppo) and Arthur Conan Doyle (as Dr. John Watson).

== Discography ==
- Live Radio, Son! (Bluesong 1974), out of print
- Solid Son (Silk City 1980), out of print
- Glad You Came (Silk City 1988), out of print
- Roadwork (Silk City 1991), out of print
- Next Train Smokin' (Silk City 1996)
- Borderline: The Ry Cooder Tribute (Hattori/Japan 1998) out of print
- Standing Room Only: Songs from the Last Roadhouse (Silk City 1999)
- Hobo Jungle: Independent Blues Artists (Silk City 2000)
- Santa Has Left The Building (Silk City 2003)
- Red, Hot, Blues (Silk City 2004)
- The Country Blues (Silk City 2004)
- Snake (Silk City 2005)
- Urban Legends of NJ (Silk City 2006)
- Dark Past (live album – Silk City 2007)
- Cadillac Rhythm (Silk City 2008)
- Not Fade Away (Silk City 2010)
- Laws of Nature (Silk City 2011)
- Dignified (Silk City 2012)
- Goin' South To Tampa (Silk City 2013)
- Too Hot (Silk City 2014)
- Stages (Silk City 2015)
- Talking with Ghosts (Silk City 2016)
- From Time To Time (Silk City 2017)
- Live at Van Gogh's Ear (Silk City 2018)
- Hoboken Nights (Silk City 2018)
- Pocono Garage (Silk City 2023)
