= Andy Lewis (cricketer) =

English cricketer

Andrew Stuart Lewis (born 6 July 1976) is an English cricketer. He is a right-handed batsman who played for Hertfordshire. He was born in Enfield.

Lewis, who made a single appearance in the Second XI Championship for Middlesex at the age of 16, made his debut for Hertfordshire in the Minor Counties Championship in 2003 - and made his only List A appearance for the team in the C&G Trophy in August 2003.

Lewis is still playing for Hertfordshire in the Minor Counties Championship as of 2011 & he has been Captain since talking over from David Ward in 2006.
