= Matthew Walshe =

English cricketer

Matthew James Walshe (born 1 April 1970) was an English cricketer who played for Hertfordshire as a right-handed batsman and right-arm medium-fast bowler. He was born in Welwyn Garden City.

Walshe, who played in the Second XI Championship for Leicestershire, Somerset, and Essex, made a single list A appearance for Hertfordshire, in the 1993 NatWest Trophy. He scored 1 batting at number 9 and took 2-67 off 12 overs opening the bowling. He dismissed Gloucestershire captain Tony Wright (hit wicket) for 14 and former England wicketkeeper Jack Russell (LBW) for 2. The Gloucestershire side that day also contained for England players Chris Broad, Mark Alleyne and Mike Smith along with former West Indian captain Courtney Walsh.

Matthew Walshe continued to represent Hertfordshire in the Minor Counties Championship until 1995. He also went on to play more than 200 games for Finchley Cricket Club, including an appearance in the 2006 Evening Standard trophy competition. Walshe captained the club's second XI and is currently serving on Finchley's executive and selection committees. He announced his retirement as a player in July 2023.
