= John Cundle =

English cricketer (born 1939)

John Cundle (born 6 August 1939) is an English former cricketer who played as a right-handed batsman for Hertfordshire. He was born in Welwyn Garden City.

Cundle, who represented the team in the Minor Counties Championship between 1961 and 1978, made a single List A appearance for the team, in the 1964 Gillette Cup, against Durham. From the opening order, he scored 2 runs, in a match in which Hertfordshire finished with just 63 runs on the board.
