= Department of Primary Industries (Queensland) =

Queensland state government department

Department overview
- Preceding agencies: Department of Agriculture and Fisheries; Primary Industries and Fisheries; Department of Primary Industries; Department of Agriculture and Stock; Department of Primary Industries and Fisheries; Department of Agriculture, Fisheries and Forestry
- Jurisdiction: Queensland Government
- Headquarters: 275 George Street, Brisbane
- Minister responsible: Tony Perrett, Minister for Primary Industries
- Child department: Biosecurity Queensland
- Website: dpi.qld.gov.au

The Department of Primary Industries is the Queensland Government department responsible for developing Queensland's primary industries. The section known as Biosecurity Queensland is responsible for biosecurity matters within the state.

The department was called the Department of Agriculture and Fisheries prior to November 2024.

== Functions ==
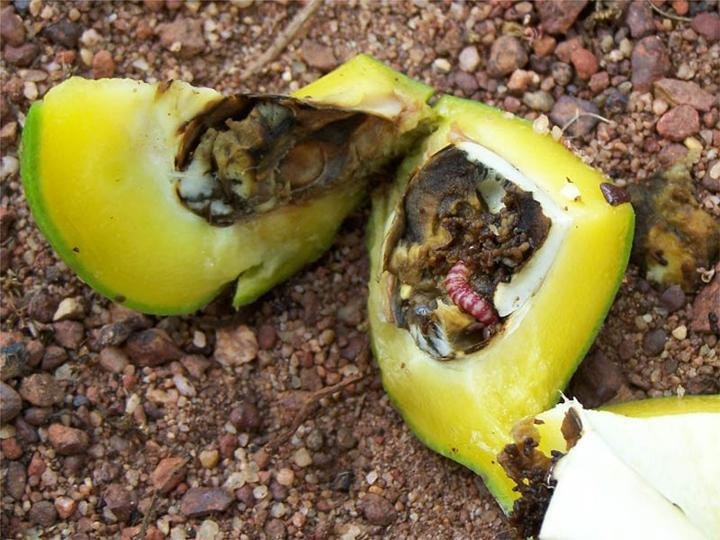
A quarantine area has been established on Cape York Peninsula and Torres Strait to stop the spread of the Red banded mango caterpillar.

Department of Primary Industries provides expertise and support that increases primary industries productivity, expands markets and assists with adaption to change. It conducts research, policy advice, protects against pests and diseases, maintains animal welfare standards, as well as managing fisheries.

== History ==
The first functions of the Department of Primary Industries began in 1855 when a sheep scab inspector began work in the New South Wales colony of Moreton Bay. After Queensland's Separation, livestock diseases were addressed through regulations administered by the Stock Branch in the Queensland Colonial Secretary's Office. The Stock Branch was established by the Queensland chief inspector of stock Patrick Robertson Gordon.

The department has been formerly known by various title, with various legislative responsibilities. Its previous names have been:

- Department of Agriculture (17 June 1887 – 1 January 1904)
- Department of Agriculture and Stock (1 January 1904 – 26 September 1963)
- Department of Primary Industries (26 September 1963 – 26 February 1996)
- Department of Primary Industries, Fisheries and Forestry (26 February 1996 – 29 June 1998)
- Department of Primary Industries (29 June 1998 – 12 February 2004)
- Department of Primary Industries and Fisheries (12 February 2004 – 25 March 2009)
- Department of Employment, Economic Development and Innovation (25 March 2009 – 3 April 2012)
- Department of Agriculture, Fisheries and Forestry (3 April 2012 – 16 February 2015)
- Department of Agriculture and Fisheries (16 February 2015 – 1 November 2024)

== Biosecurity ==
The Biosecurity Queensland section is responsible for coordinating efforts to minimise the risks and effects of threatening pests and diseases including weed management in the state.

Whilst federal legislation, Biosecurity Act 2015 (C'wealth), applies to the national border and Commonwealth land (e.g. defence sites) the state's Biosecurity Act 2014 (Qld), and the Queensland Biosecurity Strategy 2018–2023 govern and guide the department's responsibilities with regard to biosecurity and establishes the State's authority to manage post-border biosecurity issues.

The state, due to its geographical proximity to Papua New Guinea and Indonesia plus the volume of people and freight entry from overseas countries via a multitude of air and seaports, frequently is the site of incursions of exotic pests and diseases.

=== Livestock and animal diseases ===
In 2007, the newly formed Biosecurity Queensland led one of its largest responses after Equine Infuenza spread from NSW to, originally, Warwick and then throughout South East Queensland. The outbreak was contained and successfully eradicated. In 2009, Biosecurity Queensland was successful in its attempt to eradicate a citrus canker outbreak in Central Queensland. Queensland frequently responds to Hendra virus cases in horses and is seen as an international source of expertise in the management of Hendra virus; which as a zoonotic disease has caused multiple human fatalities. Whilst primarily affecting humans and horses, there have been isolated cases of Hendra virus in dogs. In 2016, White spot virus in prawns was detected on a prawn farm on the Logan River in south-east Queensland. a five-year response eradicated the virus from a number of local prawn farms however it was subsequently detected in open waters in Moreton Bay due to the difficulties in containing prawns and waste water to the farms plus native animals (crabs and birds) carrying the virus off the infected premises. This incursion was linked to the federal government permitting the import of potentially infected prawns for human consumption and recreational fishers potentially using these infected prawns for bait when fishing.

=== Plant Biosecurity ===
In 2010, Myrtle rust was detected in a retail nursery chain in suburban Brisbane; most likely introduced from NSW that had been combating the fungal pest via the nursery's supply chain. The response subsequently located Myrtle rust in over 200 properties throughout southern and central Queensland and was focused on attempting to slow the spread of the rust. In 2025, Biosecurity Queensland successfully contained and eradicated an incursion of the Varroa jacobsoni mite and an associated Asian honey bee incursion after it entered via the Port of Brisbane and spread through south-east Brisbane suburbs and industrial area. Soon after this successful eradication, a separate Varroa mite species, Varroa destructor, was detected at the Queensland-NSW border after its incursion and spread through NSW. It was not deemed feasible to contain or eradicate this pest. The Fall army worm was detected during routine surveillance activities by Biosecurity Queensland in the Torres Strait in 2020. The rapid dispersal ability of this pest meant that containment and eradication was not possible with the pest spreading throughout eastern Australia in the following months.

=== Environmental biosecurity ===
Biosecurity Queensland has led the National Red Imported Fire Ant Program, and its predecessors, since 2001 in what is considered to be Australia's longest eradication attempt. Whilst successfully eradicating some red imported fire ant incursions at ports, the program is plagued by pockets of community opposition and conspiracy theorists and variations in funding support which has impeded progress.

== Research ==
In 2009, Primary Industries and Fisheries (now Primary Industries) together with the University of Queensland were granted federal funding to study how methane emissions from cattle and sheep could be reduced.

== Publications ==
From 1897 to 1921 the department published the Queensland Agricultural Journal.

== Notable staff ==
- George Alexander Currie, agricultural scientist
- Alexandre Arsène Girault, entomologist
- Ernest James Goddard, science coordinator
- Bela "Bert" Grof, agricultural researcher
- Christopher Sheehy, dairy administrator
- Lindsay Stuart Smith, botanist

== See also ==
- 2007 Australian equine influenza outbreak
- Animal Research Institute, Yeerongpilly
- List of common weeds of Queensland
- Queensland State Soils Collection
