= Bela "Bert" Grof =

Australian agricultural researcher

Bela "Bert" Grof AM (9 June 1921 – 17 November 2011) was a Hungarian-born Australian agricultural researcher with contributions to grassland and forage research in the tropics.

== Education and early professional life ==
Grof was born in Győr, Hungary to Bela Grof and Maria née Gunde.

After migrating 1949 to Australia, he joined the Queensland Department of Agriculture and Stock in 1950. During the 1950s and 1960s, Grof was also involved in forage species collecting missions in Africa, Southeast Asia, and South and Central America.

== Professional life ==
Bert Grof spent large time of his researcher life in South America, dedicated to pasture and forage improvement. He excelled in evaluating the ecological adaptation of large collections of grass and legume forages to low fertility soils in the Colombian Llanos (i.e. Eastern Plains) (1978–1985) and the Cerrados of Brazil (1985–1992), working for the International Center for Tropical Agriculture (CIAT), one of the research centers under the Consultative Group on International Agricultural Research (CGIAR). After leaving Brazil in 1992, Grof moved to the Philippines to open a CIAT forages office for Asia and to initiate systematic evaluation of a large set of forage germplasm in South East Asia. In 1994, he returned to Brazil where he continued to work especially on Stylosanthes improvement until 1997, when he returned to Australia.

As a forage agronomist formed in the "Australian school", Grof initiated tropical legume plant breeding (selecting in hybrid Centrosema progenies) at CIAT as early as 1972 when he arrived in Colombia. He was involved in subsequent CIAT breeding programs in the legumes Stylosanthes capitata and S. guianensis during the late 1970s and throughout the 1980s.

He was an author of numerous scientific articles and book chapters, including several articles together with his CIAT colleague Derrick Thomas (see publication list below). As a pasture and forage researcher, Grof identified a large number of commercial grass and legume cultivars that enormously contributed to the improvement of tropical pastures, particularly in Australia and South America.

== Forage/pasture cultivars ==
The following forage/pasture cultivars were commercialized and/or released based on Bert Grof's germplasm collection and research results.

- Brachiaria decumbens cv. Basilisk - signal grass; now sown on tens of millions of hectares, particularly in Brazil;
- Stylosanthes guianensis cv. Cook and cv. Endeavour - stylo;
- Desmodium heterophyllum cv. Johnstone - hetero;
- Centrosema pubescens cv. Belalto - centro;
- Brachiaria ruziziensis cv. Kennedy - ruzi grass;
- Panicum maximum cv. Makueni - guinea grass;
- Stylosanthes guianensis cv. Ubon;
- Stylosanthes capitata + S. macrocephala cv. Campo Grande;
- Stylosanthes guianensis BRS Grof 1463 + S.guianensis BRS Grof 1480 cv. Bela;

== Honors and awards ==
In 2001, Bert Grof was made Fellow of the Tropical Grassland Society of Australia.

He was made a Member of the Order of Australia for services to primary industry through research and the development of sustainable tropical pasture technology to increase food production, rural incomes, and scientific knowledge in Asia, Central and Southern America, and Australia, was granted to Bert Grof in 2006.

== Bibliography ==
- Burt, R.L., Edye, L.A., Williams, W.T., Grof, B. and Nicholson, C.H.L. 1971 Numerical analysis of variation patterns in the genus Stylosanthes as an aid to plant introduction and assessment. Austral. J. Agric. Res. 22 (5): 737–757.
- Burt, R.L., Edye, L.A., Williams, W.T., Gillard, P., Grof, B., Page, M., Shaw, N.H., Williams, R.J. and Wilson, G.P.M. 1974. Small-sward testing of Stylosanthes in northern Australia: Preliminary considerations. Australian Journal of Agricultural Research 25:559-575.
- Dornelas Fernandes, C., Chakraborty, S., Grof, B., Abranches Purcino, H.M., do Socorro Bona Nascimento, M., D'Avila charchar, M.J., Verzignassi, J.R. and Sobrinho, J.M. 2004. Regional evaluation of Stylosanthes germplasm in Brazil. In: Chakraborty S. (ed.). High-yielding anthracnose-resistant Stylosanthes for agricultural systems. ACIAR Monograph no. 111, Canberra, Australia. pp. 127–134.
- Edye, L.A., Burt, R.L., Williams, W.T., Williams, R.J. and Grof, B. 1973. A preliminary agronomic evaluation of Stylosanthes species. Australian Journal of Agricultural Research 24:511-525.
- Edye, L.A., Williams, W.T., Burt, R.L., Winter, W.H., Grof, B. and Stillman, S.L. 1977. The assessment of seasonal yield using some Stylosanthes guyanensis accessions in humid tropical and subtropical environments [Queensland]. Australian Journal of Experimental Agriculture and Animal Husbandry 17(86):425-434.
- Grof, B. 1981. The performance of Andropogon gayanus-legume associations in Colombia. The Journal of Agricultural Science 96:233-237.
- Grof, B. 1982a. Breeding Centrosema pubescens in tropical South America. Tropical Grasslands 16: 80–83.
- Grof, B. 1982b. Performance of Desmodium ovalifolium Wall. in legume-grass associations. Tropical Agriculture (Trinidad) 59:33-37.
- Grof, B. 1983. Selección de cultivares forrajeros partiendo de muchas entradas sometidas a pastoreo. In: Paladines, O. (ed.). Germoplasma forrajero bajo pastoreo en pequeñas parcelas: metodologías de evaluación. Red Internacional de Evaluación de Pastos Tropicales (RIEPT), CIAT, Cali, Colombia. pp. 121–130.
- Grof, B. 1984. Yield attributes of three grasses in association with Desmodium ovalifolium in an isohyperthermic savanna environment of South America. Tropical Agriculture (Trinidad) 61(2):117-120.
- Grof, B. 1986a. Forage potential of some Centrosema species in the Llanos Orientales of Colombia. Tropical Grasslands 20(3):107-112.
- Grof, B. 1986b. Performance of associations of Desmodium canum/Brachiaria spp. in the Oxisol savannas of Colombia. Tropical Agriculture (Trinidad) 63(4):331-332.
- Grof, B. 1986c. Selection of the components of a synthetic variety of Andropogon gayanus. The Journal of Agricultural Science 106:629-633.
- Grof, B., 1991. Performance of three Centrosema spp. and Pueraria phaseoloides in grazed associations with Andropogon gayanus in the Eastern Plains of Colombia. Tropical Agriculture (Trinidad) 68(4):363-365.
- Grof, B. and Harding, W.A.T. 1970. Dry matter yields and animal production of Guinea grass (Panicum maximum) on the humid tropical coast of North Queensland. Tropical Grasslands 4(1):85-.95.
- Grof, B. and Thomas, D. 1990. The agronomy of Andropogon gayanus. In: Toledo, J.M., Vera, R., Lascano, C. and Lenné, J.M. (eds.). 1990. Andropogon gayanus Kunth: a grass for tropical acid soils. Centro Internacional de Agricultura Tropical (CIAT), Cali, Colombia. pp. 157–177.
- Grof, B., de Andrade, R.P., de Souza, M.A. and Valls, J.M.F. 1989a. Selection of Paspalum spp. adapted to seasonally flooded varzea lands in Central Brazil. Section 3: Forage plant breeding. Proceedings of the 16th International Grassland Congress, 4–11 Oct 1989, Nice, France. Association Francaise pour la Production Fourragere (AFPF), Versailles, France. pp. 291–292.
- Grof, B., de Andrade, R.P., Franca Dantas, M.S. and de Souza, M.A. 1989b. Selection of Brachiaria spp. for the acid soil savannas of the central plateau region of Brazil. Section 3: Forage plant breeding. Proceedings of the 16th International Grassland Congress, 4–11 Oct 1989, Nice, France. Association Francaise pour la Production Fourragere (AFPF), Versailles, France. pp. 267–268.
- Grof, B., Fernandes, C.D. and Fernandes A.T.F. 2001. A novel technique to produce polygenic resistance to anthracnose in Stylosanthes capitata. Proceedings of the XIX International Grassland Congress, 10–21 February 2001, São Pedro, SP, Brazil. ID # 13–01.
- Grof, B., Fernandes, C.D., Almeida, C.B. and dos Santos, A.V. 1997a. Development of a multicross cultivar of Stylosanthes spp. Proceedings of the 18th International Grassland Conference, Winnipeg, Canada. Vol. 1, pp. 4–31 to 4–32.
- Grof, B., Fernandes, C.D., Almeida, C.B. and dos Santos, A.V. 1997b. Selection of Stylosanthes guianensis for the Cerrados of Brazil. Proceedings of the 18th International Grassland Conference, Winnipeg, Canada. Vol. 1, pp. 4–33 to 4–34.
- Grof, B., Harding W.A.T. and Woolcock R.F. 1970. Effects of cutting on three ecotypes of Stylosanthes guyanensis. In: Proceedings XI International Grassland Congress. Surfers Paradise, QLD, Australia, 1970. pp. 226–230.
- Grof, B., Thomas, D., de Andrade, R.P., Zoby, J.L.F. and de Souza, M.A. 1989c. Perennial legumes and grass-legume associations adapted to poorly drained savannas in tropical South America [Aeschynomene mainly]. Section 3: Forage plant breeding. Proceedings of the 16th International Grassland Congress, 4–11 Oct 1989, Nice, France. Association Francaise pour la Production Fourragere (AFPF), Versailles, France. pp. 189–190.
- Grof, B., Flores, A.J., Mendoza, P.E. and Pizarro, E.A. 1990. Regional experience with Centrosema: Northern South America. In: Schultze-Kraft, R. and Clements, R.J. (eds.). Centrosema: Biology, agronomy, and utilization. Centro Internacional de Agricultura Tropical (CIAT), Cali, Colombia. Pp. 391–420.
- Hutton, E.M. and Grof B. 1993. Increased yield from transgressive segregates of a Stylosanthes capitata cross in a tropical oxisol. Tropical Agriculture (Trinidad) 70:345-350.
- Kitajima, E.W., Nasser, L.C.B. and Grof, B. 1987. Mycoplasmalike organisms associated with a witches broom of Centrosema brasilianum in the Federal District, Brazil. Fitopatologia Brasileira 12(3):281-283.
- Miles, J.W., Clements, R.J., Grof, B. and Serpa, A. 1990. Genetics and breeding of Centrosema. In: Schultze-Kraft, R. and Clements, R.J. (eds.). Centrosema: Biology, agronomy, and utilization. Centro Internacional de Agricultura Tropical (CIAT), Cali, Colombia. pp. 245–270.
- Miles, J.W. and Grof, B. 1990. Genetics and plant breeding of Andropogon gayanus. In: Toledo, J.M., Vera, R., Lascano, C. and Lenne, J.M. (eds.). Andropogon gayanus Kunth: a grass for tropical acid soils. Centro Internacional de Agricultura Tropical (CIAT), Cali, Colombia. pp. 19–35.
- Miles, J.W. and Grof, B. 1997. Recent advances in studies of anthracnose of Stylosanthes. III. Stylosanthes breeding approaches in South America. Tropical Grasslands 31: 430–434.
- Rocha, C.M. da, Palacios, E. and Grof, B. 1985. Capacidad de propagación de Arachis pintoi bajo pastoreo. Pasturas Tropicales – Boletin (Cali) 7(3):24-25.
- Thomas, D. and Grof, B. 1986. Some pasture species for the tropical savannas of South America. 1. Species of Stylosanthes. Herbage Abstracts 56(10):445-454.
- Thomas, D., Andrade, R.P. de and Grof, B. 1985. Problems experienced with forage legumes in a tropical savanna environment in Brazil. In: Proceedings of the 15th International Grassland Congress, 1985, Kyoto, Japan. The Science Council of Japan / Japanese Society of Grassland Science. pp. 144–146.
