= Brett Sheehy =

Australian artistic director and curator

Brett Sheehy AO
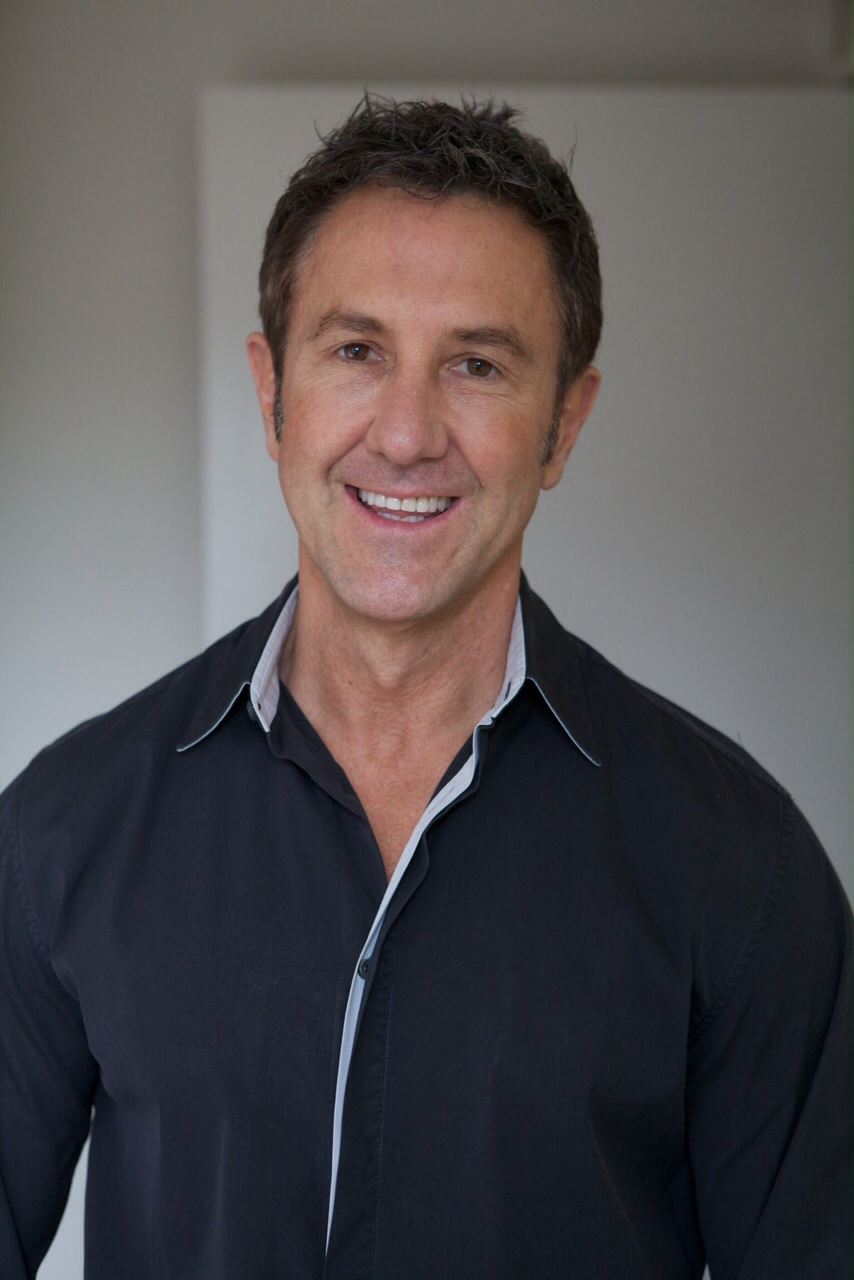
- Sheehy in 2012
- Born: Brisbane, Queensland, Australia
- Occupation: Artistic director
- Known for: – Artistic director & CEO of Melbourne Theatre Company – Artistic director & Co-CEO of Melbourne Festival – Artistic director & Co-CEO of Adelaide Festival – Artistic director & CEO of Sydney Festival – Various mentoring roles nationally
- Partner: Steven Nicholls (1994–present)

Brett Joseph Sheehy AO an Australian artistic director, producer and curator. He has been director of international arts festivals in Australia's state capital cities, Sydney Festival, Adelaide Festival, and Melbourne Festival.

== Early life and education ==
Sheehy was born and raised in Brisbane, Queensland, one of five children of Gabriel Joseph Sheehy, a retired civil and structural engineer, and founder of the consulting engineering firm, Sheehy & Partners Pty Ltd., and Joan Sheehy (née O'Sullivan), a homemaker and charity worker, particularly with the Vietnamese refugee community who arrived in Brisbane following the Vietnam War.

Sheehy was educated at St. Joseph's Christian Brothers College, Gregory Terrace, Brisbane and then at University of Queensland where he studied arts/law. Several of his family have been involved in law and public service in Queensland. His grandfather Sir Joseph Sheehy KBE served as senior puisne judge of the Supreme Court of Queensland, as administrator of the State of Queensland in 1965 and 1969, and as deputy governor and acting governor.

As a boy, Sheehy lived with an uncle, property developer Rick O'Sullivan, and his family on several occasions when Sheehy's mother endured lengthy illnesses. O'Sullivan was co-owner of the racehorse Think Big which won the Melbourne Cup in 1974 and 1975.

Despite several family members' legal background, Sheehy completed only three years of his law studies and his articled clerkship at Short, Punch & Greatorix Solicitors on Queensland's Gold Coast, before abandoning law and moving to Sydney in 1983.

== Career ==
=== Sydney Theatre Company ===
In Sydney, Sheehy became a theatre critic for the now defunct Sydney City Express newspaper and in late 1984 joined the Sydney Theatre Company (STC) under the stewardship of Richard Wherrett. At STC he held various positions over a ten-year period, including artistic associate, literary manager and deputy general manager, and he was dramaturg of a dozen productions.

While at STC, Sheehy is credited with helping give Sydney the now often-used moniker and nickname of "Emerald City" by suggesting this as the title for playwright David Williamson's 1987 play about the city, which Williamson accepted, adding a line of dialogue "The Emerald City of Oz. Everyone comes here along their yellow brick roads looking for the answers to their problems and all they find are the demons within themselves." The play Emerald City was produced nationally and later toured to the West End in London.

In 1991 Sheehy was involved in challenging the automatic attribution of world-wide English-speaking rights in American plays to US producers, which could prevent their presentation in Australia for several years following their Broadway premieres.

=== Sydney Festival ===
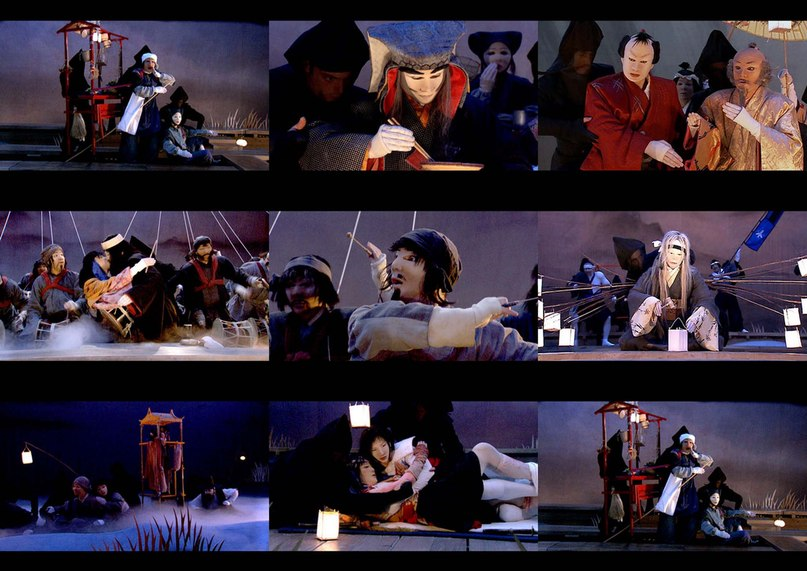
The Flood Drummers, Théâtre du Soleil's Australian debut at 2002 Sydney Festival

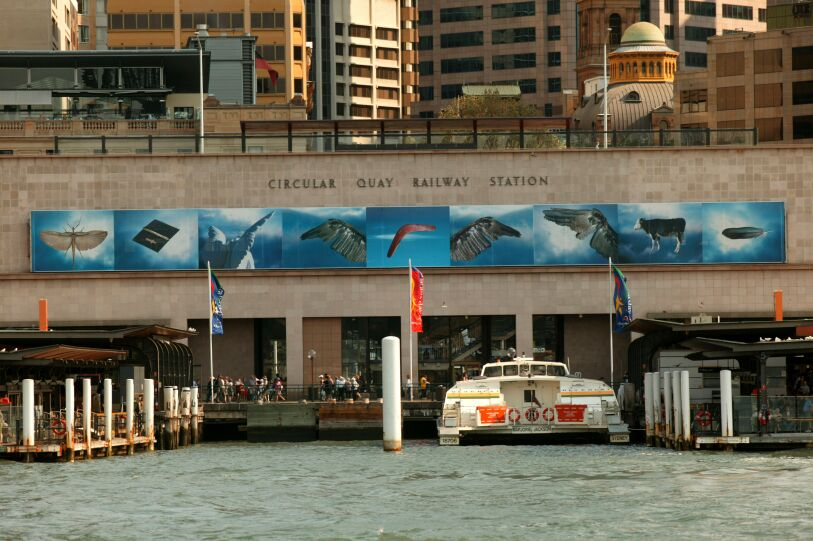
Michael Riley's Cloud at the 2003 Sydney Festival

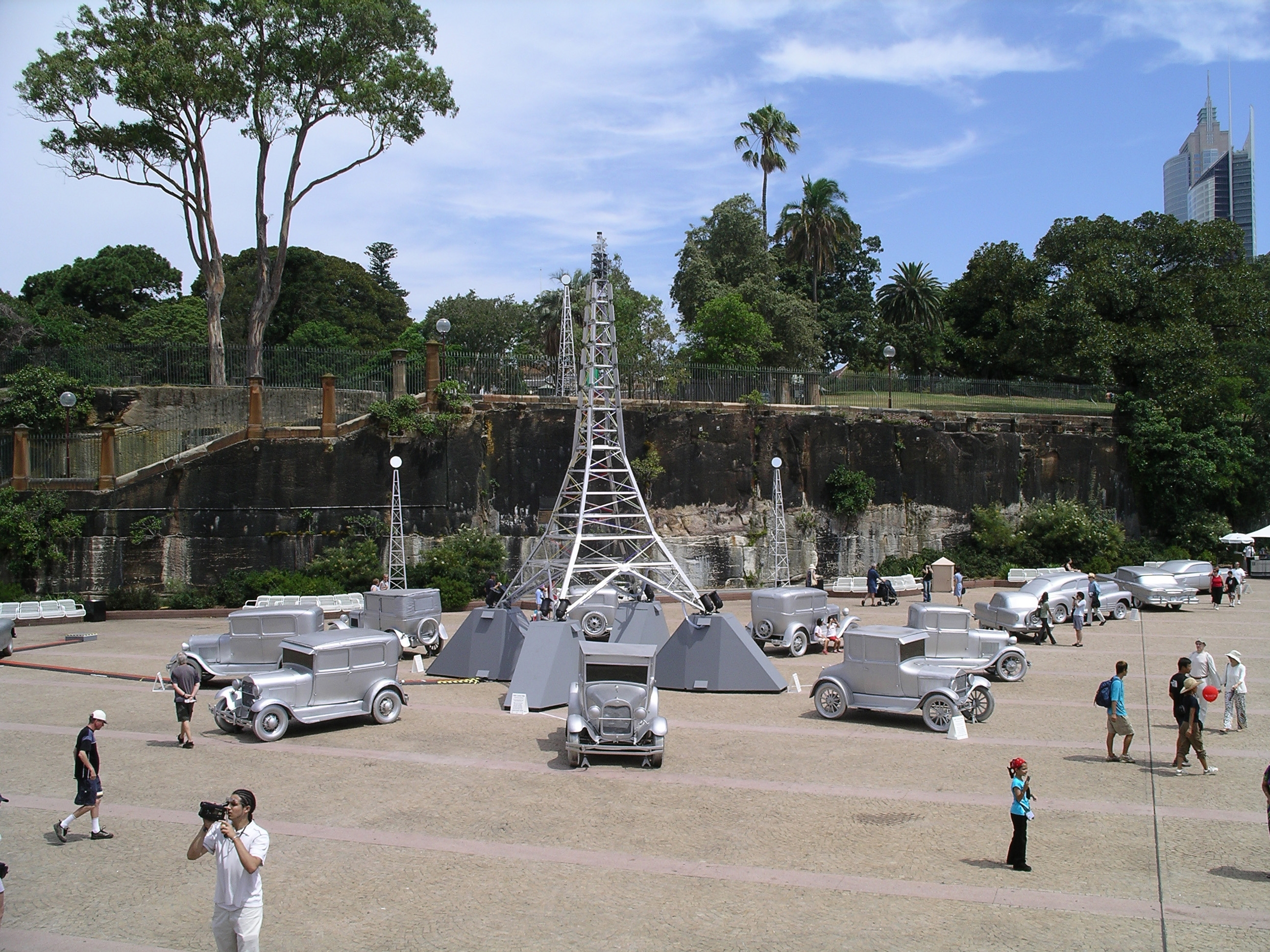
Nam June Paik's Transmission and 32 Cars for the 20th Century at the 2004 Sydney Festival

In 1995 Sheehy left STC to become administrator of Sydney Festival under the leadership of Anthony Steel and in 1997 became deputy director to Steel's successor, Leo Schofield. Sheehy completed four Sydney Festivals as Schofield's deputy (1998 to 2001) and succeeded Schofield as festival director and CEO in February 2001.

Sheehy's four Sydney Festivals (2002 to 2005) included 37 world premieres, saw the festival double its box office attendances, posted four successive financial surpluses, recorded a 30% increase in attendances to free outdoor events, established satellite festival precincts at Fox Studios Australia and in Greater Sydney, developed a following in the 18 to 35 age group, was voted Sydney's Best and Most Popular Event by the Sydney Chamber of Commerce, and was twice named the Best Event in New South Wales (2003 and 2005) by NSW Tourism (since renamed Destination NSW).

Sheehy's final Sydney Festival event at the Sydney Opera House Concert Hall, the Came So Far For Beauty Leonard Cohen tribute concert starring Jarvis Cocker, Beth Orton, Nick Cave, Rufus Wainwright, and Antony Hegarty, among others, was filmed and recorded for the international documentary and album Leonard Cohen: I'm Your Man.

=== Adelaide Festival ===
In 2003 Sheehy was appointed artistic director of the then-biennial Adelaide Festival, to succeed Stephen Page following Page's 2004 festival. He directed the festival from 2005 to 2008.

The reception of the 2006 festival was positive. Australian media claimed Sheehy had restored Adelaide Festival's status as the pre-eminent arts festival of Australia. News Limited press headlined "Festival baHeck as best in nation", and the Fairfax Media echoed these sentiments. The subsequent 2008 festival broke box office and attendance records for Adelaide Festival's 48-year history, and was claimed to have been the world's first carbon-neutral international arts festival, achieved in concert with the South Australian Government.

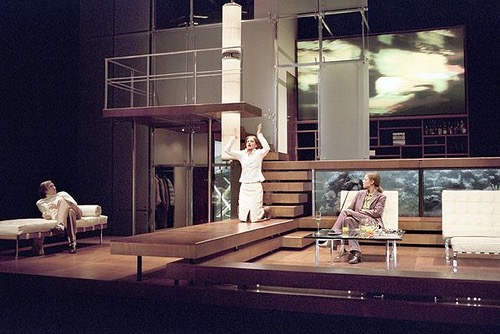
Nora (A Doll's House, Schaubühne's and Thomas Ostermeier's Australian debut at the 2006 Adelaide Festival

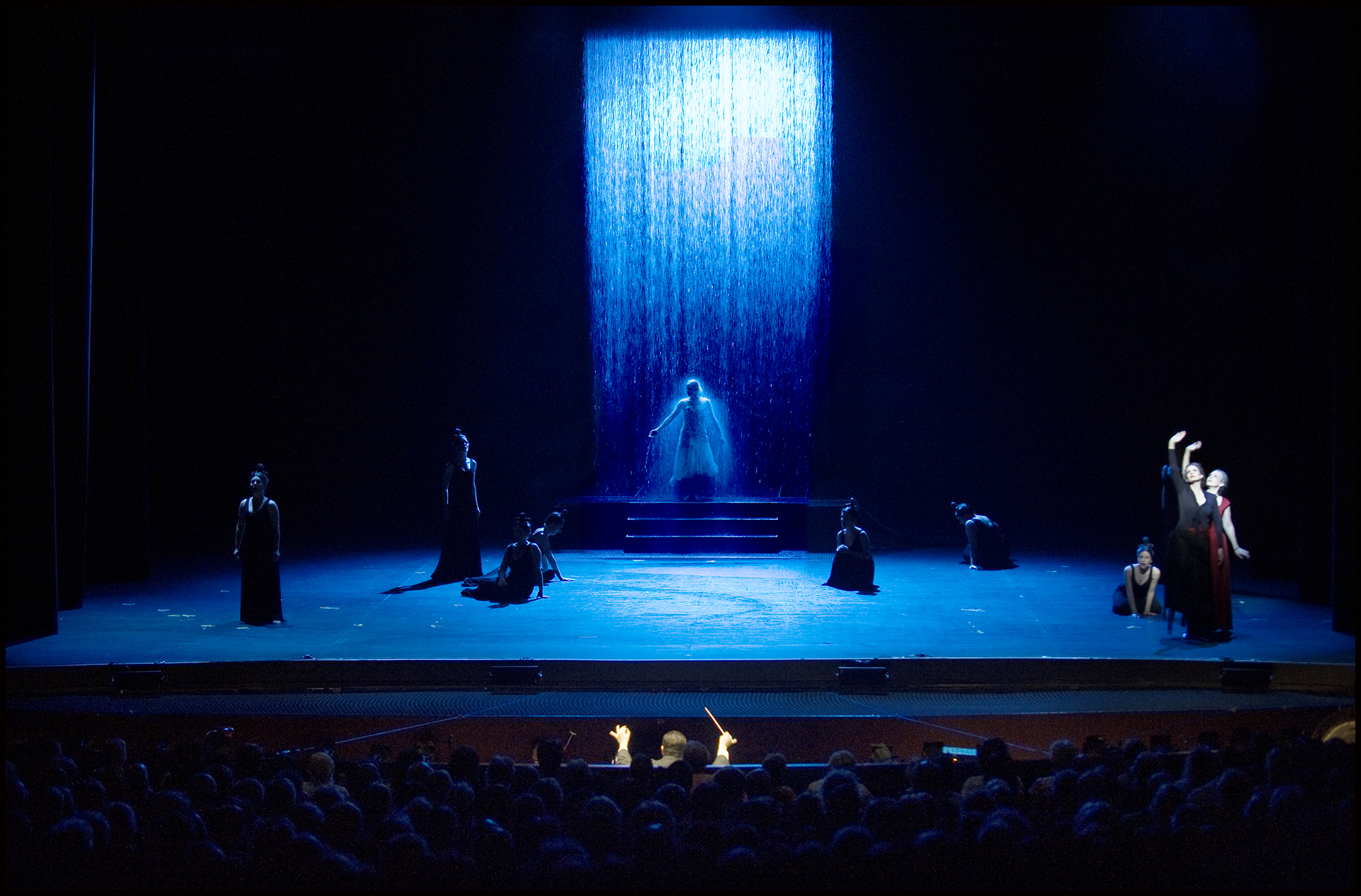
Ainadamar by Osvaldo Golijov at the 2008 Adelaide Festival

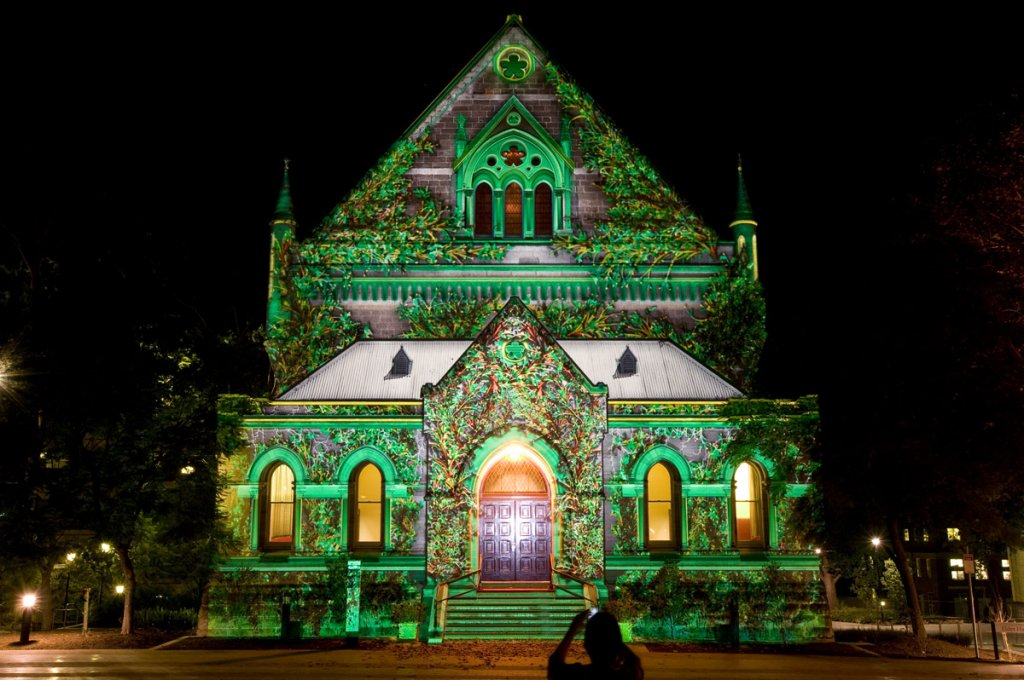
One of the multiple Northern Lights installations by Electric Canvas at 2008 Adelaide Festival

In Adelaide, Sheehy's team secured with Adelaide Bank the largest arts sponsorship in the State of South Australia, at A$3 million over three festivals, with an option on a further two festivals.

In August 2024, after current director Ruth Mackenzie was appointed to a senior government role, it was announced that Sheehy would again take assume the role of AD of Adelaide Festival until a new one is appointed for the 2026 festival.

=== Melbourne Festival ===
In 2008 Sheehy was appointed artistic director and co-CEO of the annual Melbourne International Arts Festival where he directed the 2009 to 2012 festivals.

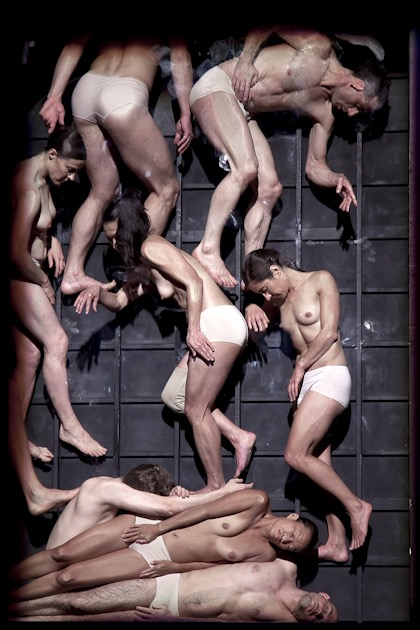
Körper (bodies), Sasha Waltz's Australian debut at the 2009 Melbourne Festival

In 2011 the premiere production of Notes from the Hard Road and Beyond by the Indigenous music ensemble Black Arm Band, directed by Steven Richardson, was commissioned and performed.

The 2009 Melbourne Festival saw a 55% increase in the festival's economic impact on the city of Melbourne, with his subsequent festival programs growing that figure by another 41% to $39.5 million, resulting in an overall increase of 120% (independent figures by Roy Morgan Research and Sweeney Research). The Age newspaper claimed that in 2009 the festival "regained much of the tensile strength it lost in recent years (with a program which) made this year's festival special and so beguiling".

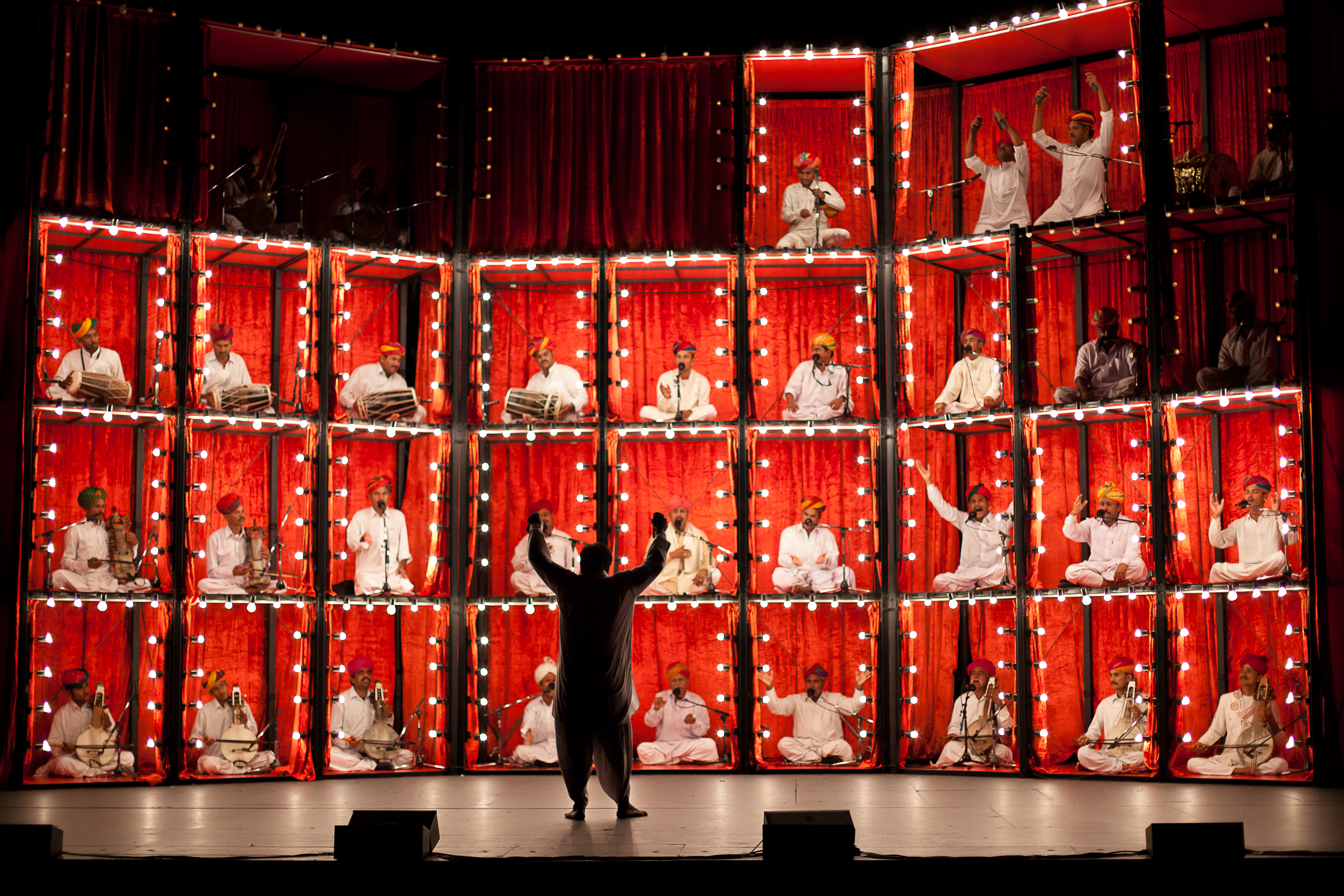
The Manganiyar Seduction by Roysten Abel at the 2011 Melbourne Festival

Sheehy's 2011 Melbourne Festival broke box office records for that festival's 27-year history. In Melbourne Sheehy programmed his first composer-in-residence suite of works, with British composer Thomas Adès, as well as the London Philharmonic Orchestra (hosting the Orchestra's Patron HRH Prince Edward, Duke of Kent). These and other classical music presentations were in counterpoint to Sheehy's contemporary music programs, curated with Hannah Fox and Tom Supple, mostly staged at Melbourne's historic Forum Theatre. International and national music artists performed in genres as diverse as post-rock, noise rock, psychedelic jazz-hop, R&B funk-rap, synthpop, electroclash and extreme metal, with geographic surveys from Palestinian hip-hop to Chinese indie rock, hardcore and punk to Sri Lankan heavy metal.

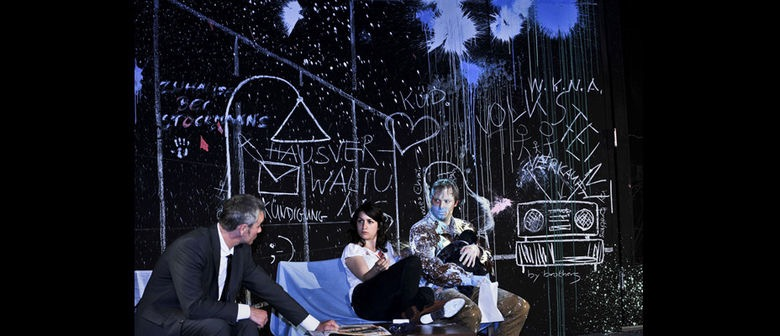
An Enemy of the People by Schaubühne Berlin at the 2012 Melbourne Festival

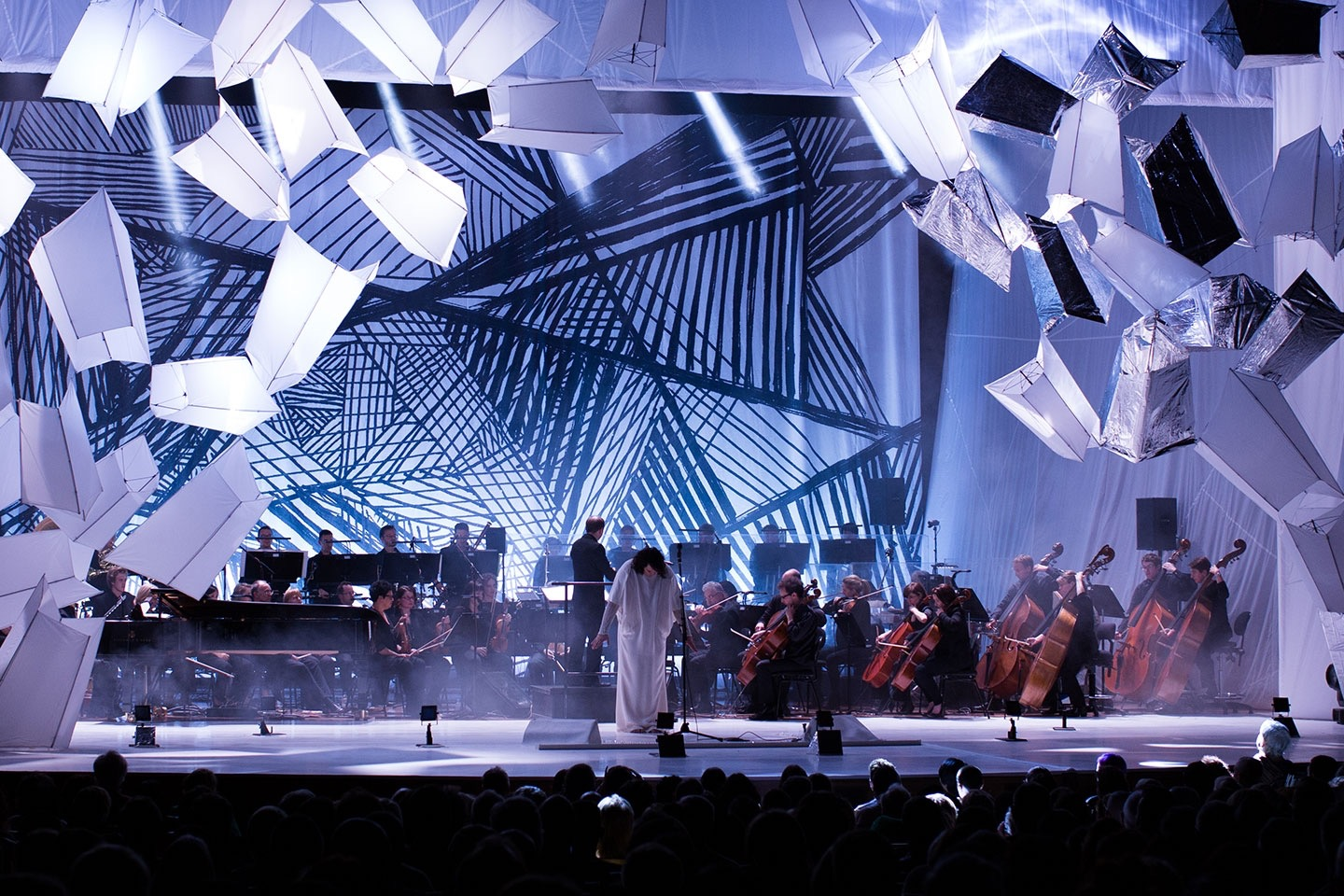
Swanlights starring Antony, at the 2012 Melbourne Festival

For the opening weekend of Sheehy's final Melbourne Festival program he returned to an artist from the Sydney Festival's Came So Far For Beauty concerts, Antony Hegarty, and presented the Museum of Modern Art commission Swanlights – a musical artwork created by Hegarty, Chris Levine and Carl Robertshaw with 44-piece orchestra, based on the Antony and the Johnsons album of the same name. The production Swanlights had been presented one other night previously, at Radio City Music Hall in New York City. Sheehy has been variously dubbed "Mr Sydney" and Australia's "Mr Festival" due to his extensive festival career which began with his ten-year tenure at Sydney Festival.

=== Melbourne Theatre Company ===
In February 2011 Sheehy was appointed artistic director and CEO of Melbourne Theatre Company, to succeed Simon Phillips.

At Melbourne Theatre Company, Sheehy's inaugural season in 2013 included MTC's first presentation of an international West End production (with Arts Centre Melbourne), the Royal National Theatre's One Man, Two Guvnors; Australia's first festival of independent theatre NEON; the first stage-play by singer, songwriter, author and actor Eddie Perfect; the MTC debut of director Simon Stone; film and stage actor David Wenham in The Crucible; the family production The Book of Everything; the Company's inaugural Women Directors Program; and the inaugural MTC CONNECT Diverse Artists Program with Multicultural Arts Victoria. This resulted in MTC's highest box office in its 60-year history, with attendances of 263,000 and 19,800 subscribers, the largest theatre subscriber base in Australia. The Age newspaper's end-of-year editorial claimed the 2013 program was jointly responsible (with National Gallery of Victoria's 2013 program) for Melbourne's cultural renaissance in that year.

In 2014 MTC toured its production of Rupert, David Williamson's satirical bio-play about the life of Rupert Murdoch, to Kennedy Center in Washington D.C. Sheehy's 2014 program also included the second NEON Festival of Independent Theatre; the first stage-play by Australian film and television artists Working Dog Productions The Speechmaker; MTC's co-presentation of musical Once with Gordon Frost Organisation; and a regional tour of its education production Yellow Moon. 2014 also saw MTC's first mainstage multi-artform production, with dance ensemble Chunky Move, of Falk Richter and Anouk van Dijk's Complexity of Belonging which opened the 2014 Melbourne Festival and opens the Spring Festival in Utrecht, Netherlands, in early 2015, followed by seasons at Schaubühne Berlin and Théâtre national de Chaillot in Paris.

== Other appointments ==
- Mentor, Foundation for Young Australians' World of Work Program (2014)
- Mentor, Australia Council's Emerging Leaders Development Program (since 2012)
- Judge, Sidney Myer Performing Arts Awards (since 2012)
- Board member, SBS (Special Broadcasting Service) Subscription TV Ltd. (2011 to 2012)
- Artistic director, Cultural Program, 5th Biennial World Summit on Arts and Culture presented by the 76 country alliance of the International Federation of Arts Councils and Culture Agencies (2011)
- Mentor and selector, Harold Mitchell Foundation Fellowship (2009 to 2012)
- Member, artists' advisory panel, Bell Shakespeare Company (2009 to 2012)
- Founding ambassador, Australia Council's We All Play a Part initiative encouraging nationwide community involvement in the arts (since 2008)
- Member, Creative Australia, Australia 2020 Summit (2008)
- Member, Power Panel, Australian Financial Review Magazine (2005 to 2008)
- Member, Arts Advisory Group, ABC (Australian Broadcasting Corporation) (2003 to 2005)
- Member, Committee for Sydney (2001 to 2005)
- Board member, Australian Theatre for Young People (1999 to 2003)
- Member, Arts and Events Committee, NSW Centenary of Federation (1998 to 2001)
- Member, Sydney Carnivale Council (1996 to 1998)
- Member, Sydney Writers' Festival Committee (1995 to 1997)
- Script assessor, Australia Council (1989 to 1990)
- Reader, Australian National Playwrights' Centre (1988 to 1989)
- Judge (with Glenn A. Baker), Sydney Rock and Roll Eisteddfod (1986 to 1988)

== Recognition, awards and honours ==
In 2012 the second highest civilian honour in Australia, Officer of the Order of Australia (AO), was awarded to Sheehy. With this appointment he became one of the few Australians to have received a national honours citation for distinguished service to both artistic disciplines of the performing arts and the visual arts.

Sheehy's other awards have included:

- Twice winner (with Geoffrey Gifford), International Society for the Performing Arts (ISPA) Award – Best Design Direct Mail Sales Brochure (1993 and 1994)
- Winner, the 1991 Mobil Fellowship in Arts Administration (1991)
- Winner, the 1987 Qantas International Theatre Scholarship (1987)

In 2005 Sheehy was named by the Australian Financial Review Magazine as one of the 20 Australians to be watched for their impact on society up to the year 2020, and in 2007 he was named by ABC's Limelight magazine as one of the five most influential arts figures in Australia, an attribution repeated in 2011 when the AFR Magazine named him as one of Australia's five leading arts identities – with then-Federal Arts Minister Simon Crean, National Gallery of Victoria director Tony Ellwood, actress Cate Blanchett and Sydney Opera House CEO Louise Herron.

In 2002 Sheehy was painted by artist Paul Newton for the Archibald Prize, with the painting subsequently being a finalist in the 2004 Doug Moran National Portrait Prize, the richest portrait prize in the world. Sheehy was again painted for the Archibald Prize in 2012 by artist Caroline Thew.

== Publications ==
- Willsteed, T. & Sheehy, B. (eds.) (1989) Sydney Theatre Company 1978 to 1988, Focus Books ISBN 1 875 359 001

== Personal life ==
Sheehy's former partner, medical practitioner Paul Weber, suicided on 28 May 1989. Weber left a message on Sheehy's phone indicating he was about to take his own life. Sheehy and Richard Wherrett, who had both been working at a preview performance of Sydney Theatre Company's Romeo and Juliet at the Sydney Opera House that night, together found Weber's body. Weber's medical practice had been devoted almost exclusively to treating AIDS patients, and the consistent loss of his patients' lives drove Weber into deep depression. While Sheehy has only twice publicly alluded to the events of that night, Wherrett described them in some detail in his autobiography The Floor of Heaven.

In 2009, Sheehy's partner since August 1994, was chef Steven Nicholls.
