= Christopher Sheehy =

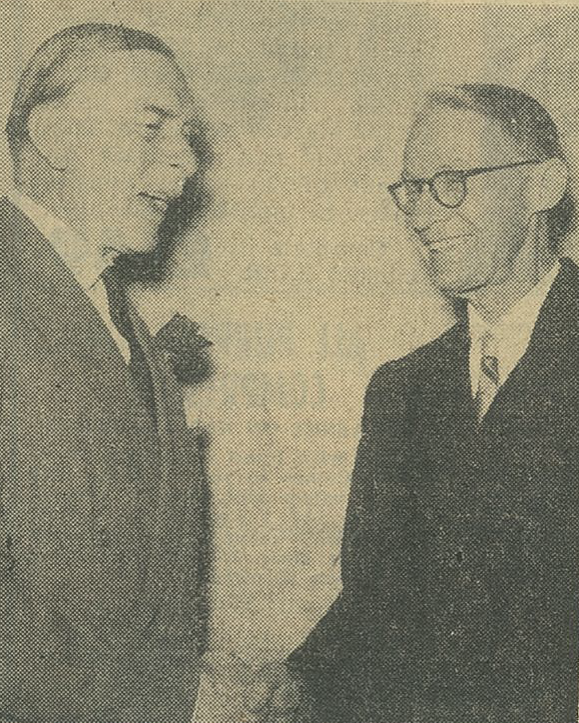
Sir Christopher Sheehy OBE (right) with then-Governor Sir Henry Abel Smith KCMG, KCVO, DSO

Sir Christopher Sheehy OBE (25 December 1894 – 31 August 1960) was one of Queensland's and Australia's leading dairy industry administrators.

== Early life, family background and education ==
Sheehy was born at Gympie, Queensland, the third of six children of Irish-born parents Jeremiah Sheehy, goldmine manager, and his wife Kate, née O'Driscoll. Sheehy was educated at the Christian Brothers' College, Gympie.

Sheehy's brother and sister also served the State of Queensland. His brother The Honourable Sir Joseph Sheehy KBE was a Queensland Supreme Court Justice and three times Administrator of the State of Queensland, and his sister Kathleen Sheehy was a champion of special education in Queensland, being instrumental in renaming State education classes for children with disabilities from 'backward classes' to 'opportunity classes,' and was appointed head of the State's first ever Opportunity school (later renamed Special schools).

Sheehy studied accountancy in Brisbane and joined the Queensland Department of Agriculture and Stock as a clerk in January 1911. In February 1920 he married Ruby Maria Bridget Barlow, a Sydney-born clerk, who later became Lady (Ruby) Sheehy when Sheehy was knighted.

== Queensland State appointments ==
Sheehy was Secretary of the Queensland Wheat Board from 1920 and Secretary of the Queensland Council of Agriculture from 1926 to 1938. In 1928 Sheehy also became Secretary of the Queensland Butter Board, a position he combined with that of State Secretary (1928 to 1934) for the (Thomas) 'Paterson Plan', which levied butter production to pay a bounty on the exported product.

== Australian Federal appointments ==
In 1937 Sheehy became General Manager of Australia's Commonwealth Dairy Produce Equalisation Committee Ltd, retaining the post until his death. In 1943 the Australian Government appointed Sheehy controller of dairy products under the New Food Plan, and in 1952 he was appointed Chairman of the Australian Dairy Produce Board.

== Awards and honours ==
In January 1951 Sheehy was appointed an Officer of the Order of the British Empire (OBE). He was subsequently knighted by Queen Elizabeth II in June 1959.

== Death ==
Soon after being reappointed Chairman of the Australian Dairy Produce Board by the Australian Government in June 1960, Sheehy died on 31 August 1960 of a ruptured duodenal ulcer. Following a Requiem Mass at St Stephen's Cathedral he was buried in Nudgee Cemetery.
