= Desmodium ovalifolium =

Desmodium ovalifolium can refer to the following plant species:

- Desmodium ovalifolium Guill. & Perr., a synonym of Grona adscendens (Sw.) H.Ohashi & K.Ohashi
- Desmodium ovalifolium (Prain) Wall. ex Ridl., a synonym of Grona ovalifolia (Prain) H.Ohashi, K.Ohashi & Tagane
- Desmodium ovalifolium Walp., a synonym of Alysicarpus rugosus (Willd.) DC. subsp. rugosus
