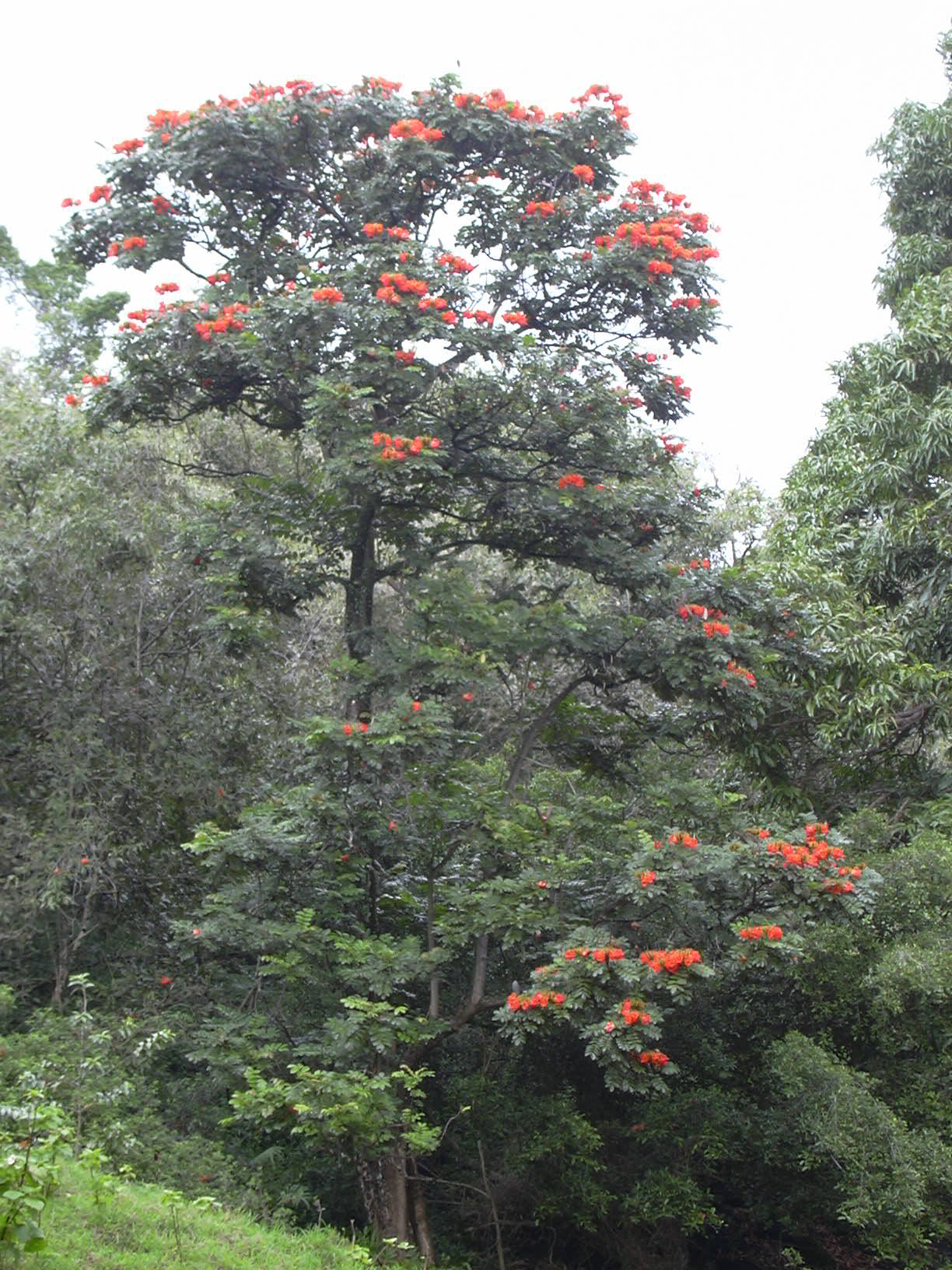

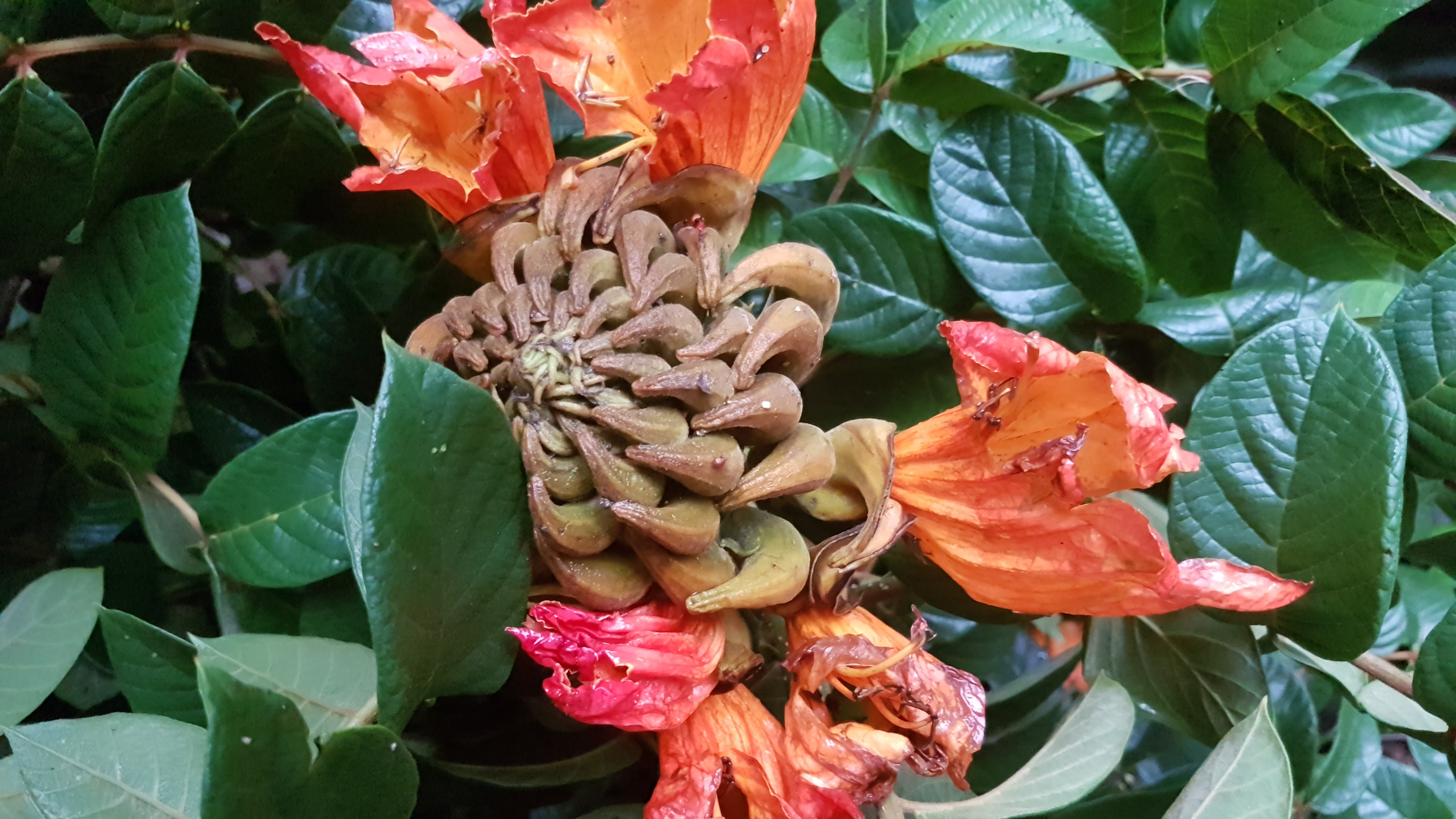

Conservation status
- Least Concern (IUCN 3.1)

Scientific classification
- Kingdom: Plantae
- Clade: Tracheophytes
- Clade: Angiosperms
- Clade: Eudicots
- Clade: Asterids
- Order: Lamiales
- Family: Bignoniaceae
- Clade: Crescentiina
- Clade: Paleotropical clade
- Genus: Spathodea; P.Beauv.
- Species: S. campanulata

Binomial name
- Spathodea campanulata P.Beauv.

= Spathodea =

Genus of trees

Spathodea is a genus in the plant family Bignoniaceae. The single species it contains, Spathodea campanulata, is commonly known as the African tulip tree or the Nandi Flame. The tree grows between 7–25 m (23–82 ft) tall and is native to tropical dry forests of Africa. It has been nominated as among 100 of the "World's Worst" invaders.

This tree is planted extensively as an ornamental tree throughout the tropics and is much appreciated for its very showy reddish-orange or crimson (rarely yellow), campanulate flowers.

== Taxonomy ==
The name and description of this genus were first published in 1805 by Ambroise Palisot de Beauvois. Palisot de Beauvois mentions the spathe-like calyx but doesn't give the etymology of the name. Gledhill gives it as derived from the Ancient Greek words σπαθη (spathe) and οιδα (oida), but that second part is contested. Another explanation is that it's derived from the Ancient Greek -ώδης (odes), a suffix meaning '-like' or 'resembling'. The name thus refers to the spathe-like calyx. It was identified by Europeans in 1787 on the Gold Coast of Africa.

== Description ==
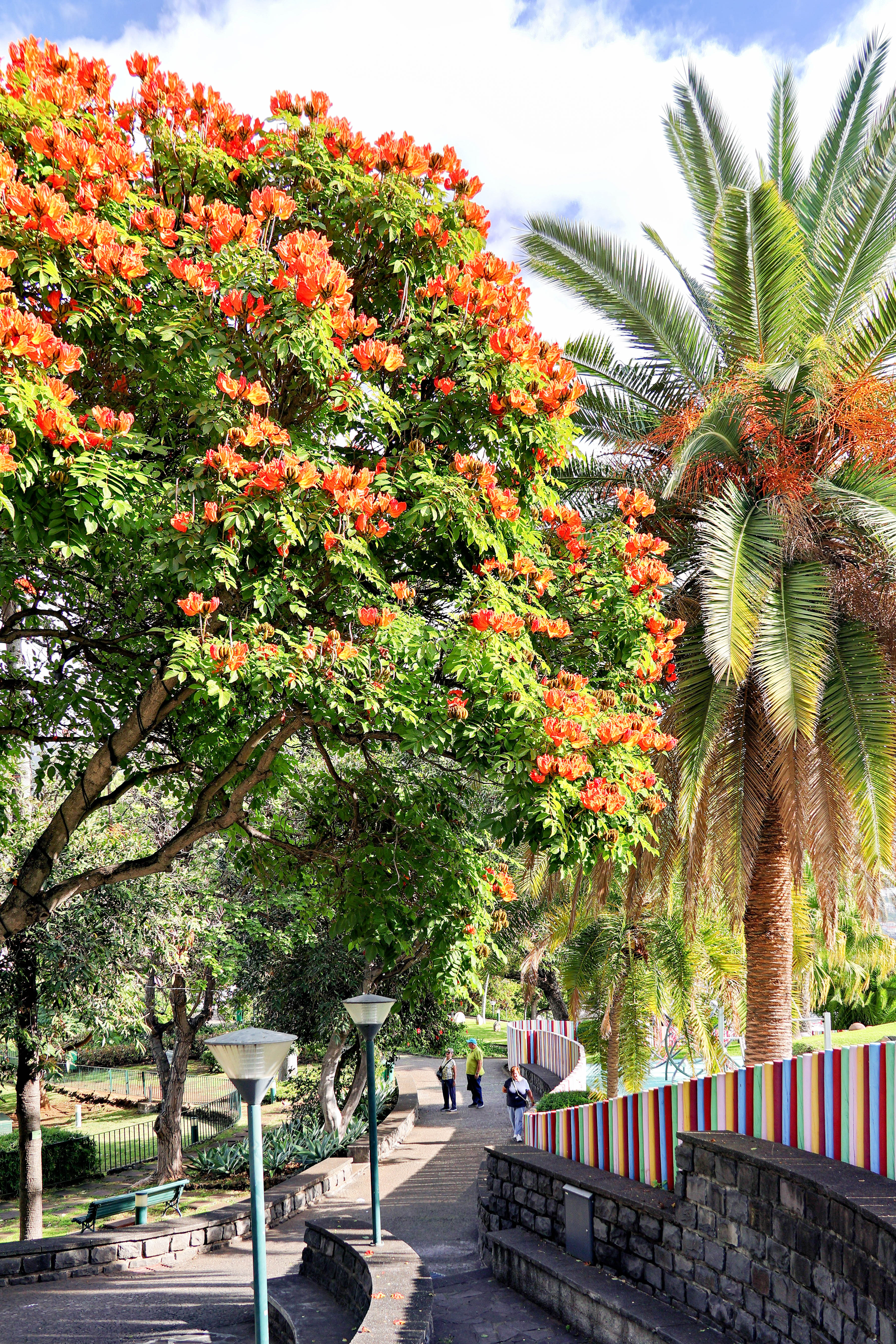
Spathodea on Madeira

The flower bud is ampule-shaped and contains water. People sometimes play with these buds because of their ability to squirt water. The sap sometimes stains yellow on fingers and clothes. The open flowers are cup-shaped and hold rain and dew, making them attractive to many species of birds.

== Flower anatomy ==
The African tulip tree flower produces large flamboyant reddish-orange flowers that have approximately five petals and are 8–15 cm long. The flowers are bisexual and zygomorphic. These are displayed in a terminal corymb-like raceme inflorescence. Its pedicel is approximately 6 cm long. This flower also has a yellow margin and throat. The pistil can be found at center of four stamens that is inserted on the corolla tube. This flower has a slender ovary that is superior and is two celled. The seeds of this tree are flat, thin, and broadly winged.

== Species associations ==
In Neotropical gardens and parks, their nectar is popular with many hummingbirds, such as the black-throated mango (Anthracothorax nigricollis), the black jacobin (Florisuga fusca), or the gilded hummingbird (Hylocharis chrysura). The wood of the tree is soft and is used for nesting by many hole-building birds such as barbets. Unfortunately the flowers have a natural defence killing bees, and it is thought various other species who harvest its pollen.

== Geographic distribution ==
- Native to: Angola, Cameroon, Ethiopia, Ghana, Kenya, Sudan, Tanzania, Uganda, Zambia
- Exotic in: Australia, Bangladesh,Brazil, Colombia, Costa Rica, Cuba, Fiji, Hawaii, Honduras, India, Jamaica, Mauritius, Mexico, Papua New Guinea, Puerto Rico, Sri Lanka, Zanzibar, Philippines

It has become an invasive species in many tropical areas, such as Hawaii, Queensland (Australia), Fiji, Papua New Guinea, South Africa and the wet and intermediate zones of Sri Lanka.

Spathodea campanulata is a declared class 3 pest species in Queensland, Australia, under the Land Protection (Pest and Stock Route Management) Act 2002. It is known to be toxic to Australian native stingless bees, such as Lipotriches (Austronomia) flavoviridis.

== Pests and diseases ==
In Uganda, two lepidopteran species, two termite species, and one bark beetle attack S. campanulata. In Puerto Rico nine insect species in the orders Hemiptera, Hymenoptera, Lepidoptera, and Thysanoptera have been reported as feeding on various parts of S. campanulata. The species is quite susceptible to butt and heart rot; wood of the tree rots quickly when in contact with the ground.

== Use ==
Its wood is too weak for construction use but ideal enough for boxes and toothpicks. Fijian children sometimes use its flower buds as water pistols.

== Common names ==
- Afrikaans: fakkelboom, Afrika-vlamboom
- Bangla: rudrapalash (রুদ্রপলাশ)
- English: African tulip tree, fountain tree, Nandi flame, Nile flame, squirt tree, tulip tree, Uganda flame, Flame Tree of Thika
- Fijian: pasiu, pisipisi
- French: tulipier de Gabon
- Hindi: rugtoora (रुग्तूरा)
- Javanese: ꦕꦿꦸꦠ꧀ꦕꦿꦸꦠꦤ꧀ crut-crutan
- Kannada: Neerukayi mara, Jeerkolavi mara (ನೀರುಕಾಯಿ ಮರ, ಜೀರ್ಕೊೞವಿ ಮರ, ಜೀರ್ಕೊಳವಿ ಮರ)
- Luganda: kifabakazi
- Luhya: muzurio
- Malay: panchut-panchut
- Malayalam: African Poomaram (ആഫ്രിക്കൻ പൂമരം)
- Sinhala: kudaella gaha, kudulu
- Spanish: amapola, espatodea, mampolo, tulipán africano, in Puerto Rico meaíto, in Guatemala llama del bosque.
- Sundanese: ᮊᮄ ᮃᮎᮢᮦᮒ᮪ kaï acret or ᮊᮤᮃᮎᮢᮦᮒ᮪ kiacret
- Swahili: kibobakasi, kifabakazi
- Telugu: Neeti Budda (నీటి బుడ్డ), Gonuganta (గోనుగంట)
- Tamil: pasadi (பாசடி)
- Nandi: Septet (singular), Septonok (plural)
- Trade name: Nandi flame

== Gallery ==
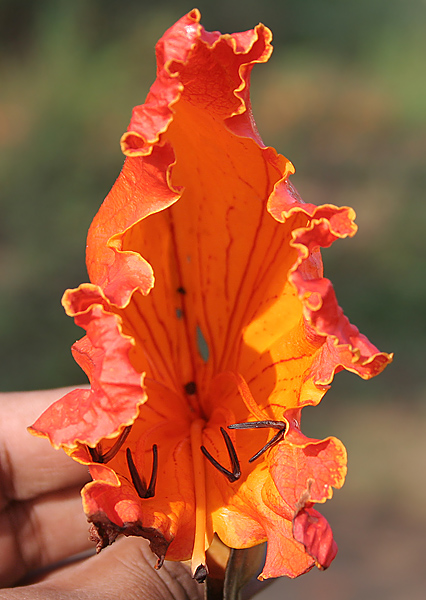
Flower

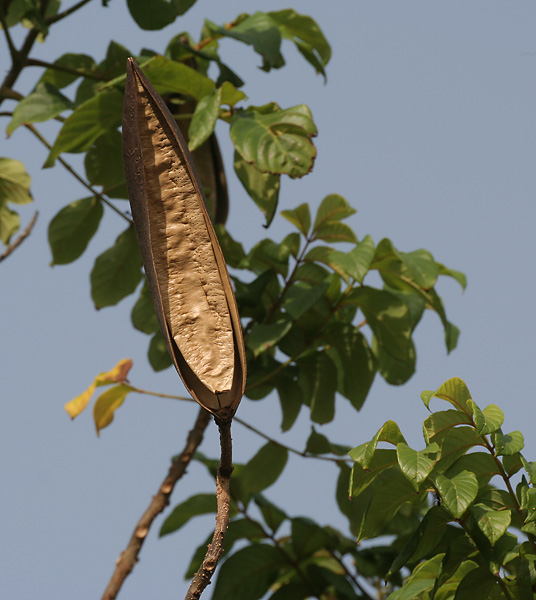
Fruit

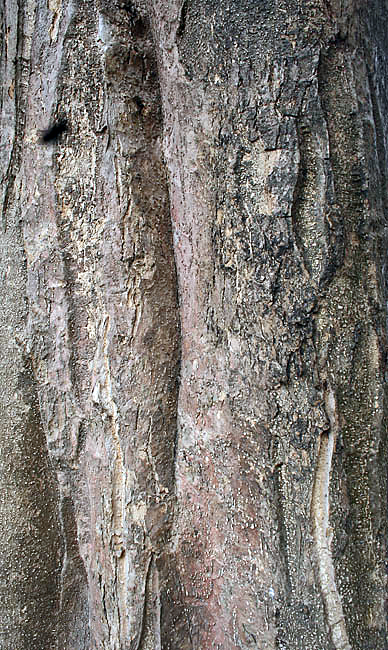
Bark

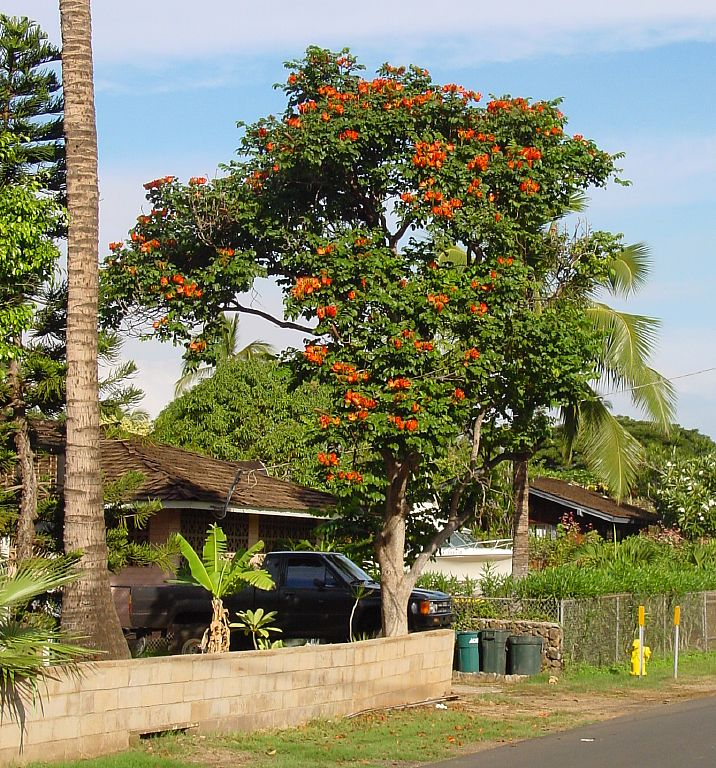
Habitus

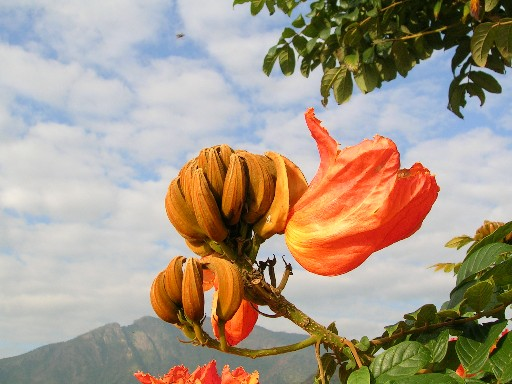
Buds

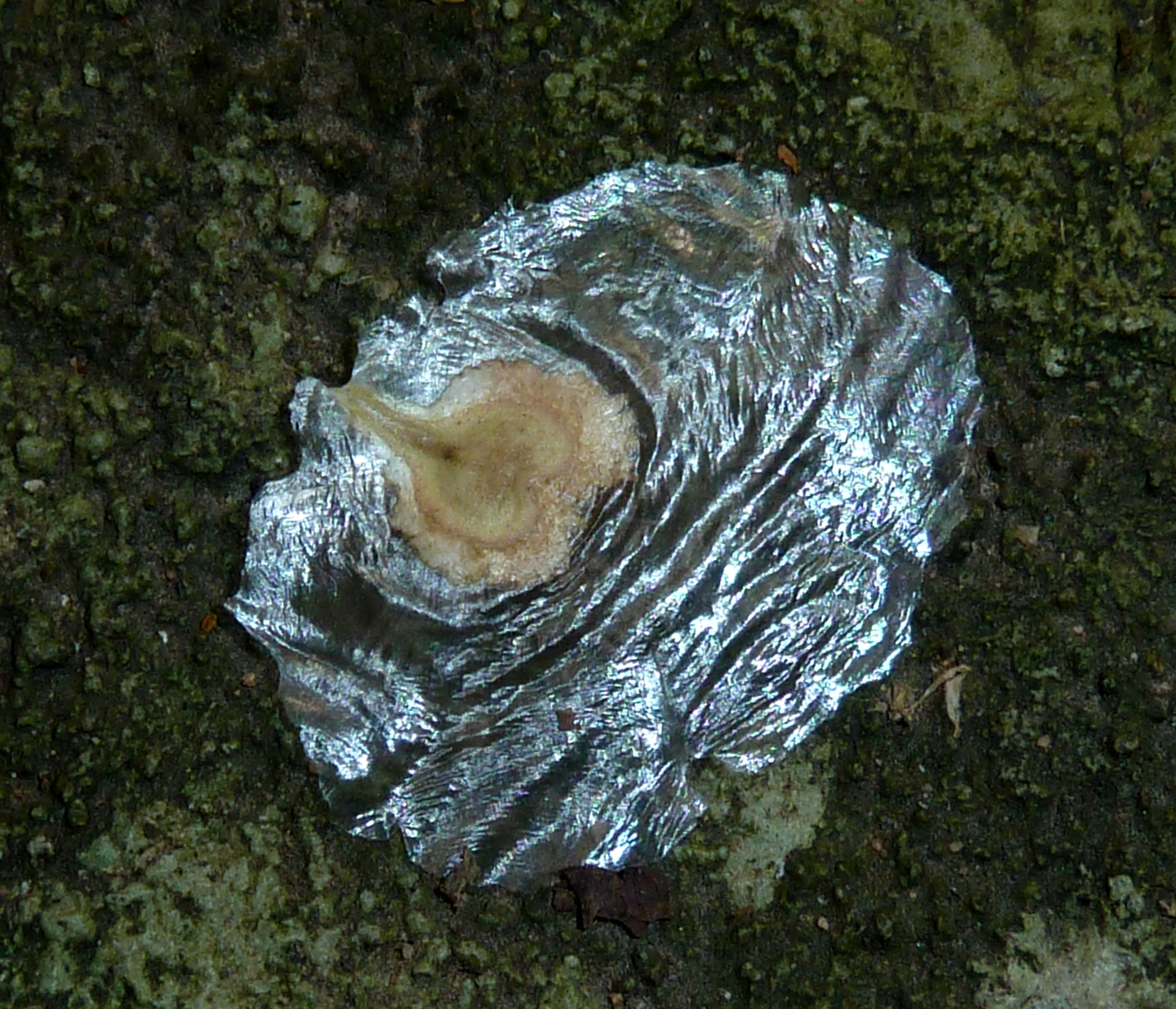
Seed

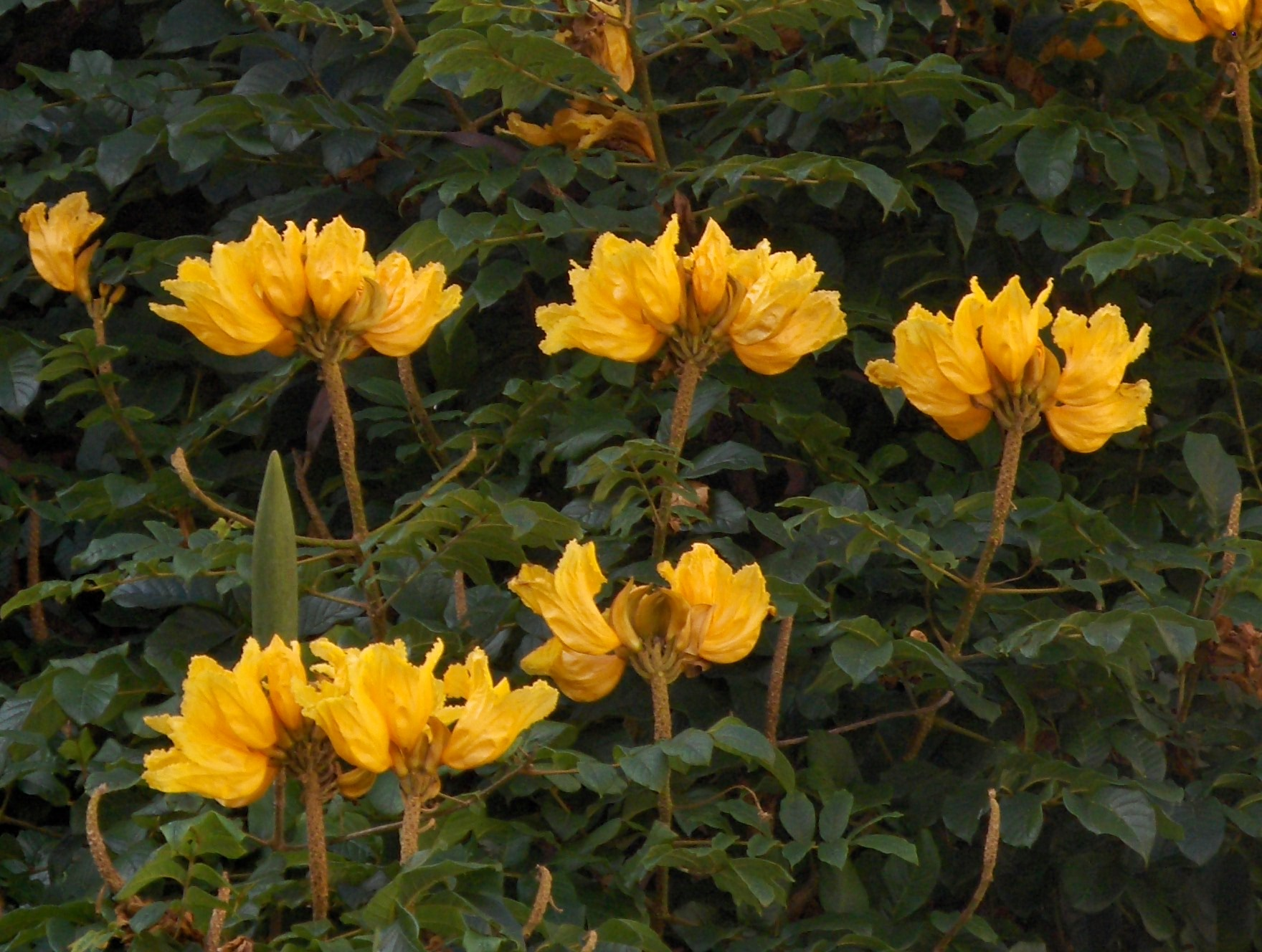
Yellow cultivar

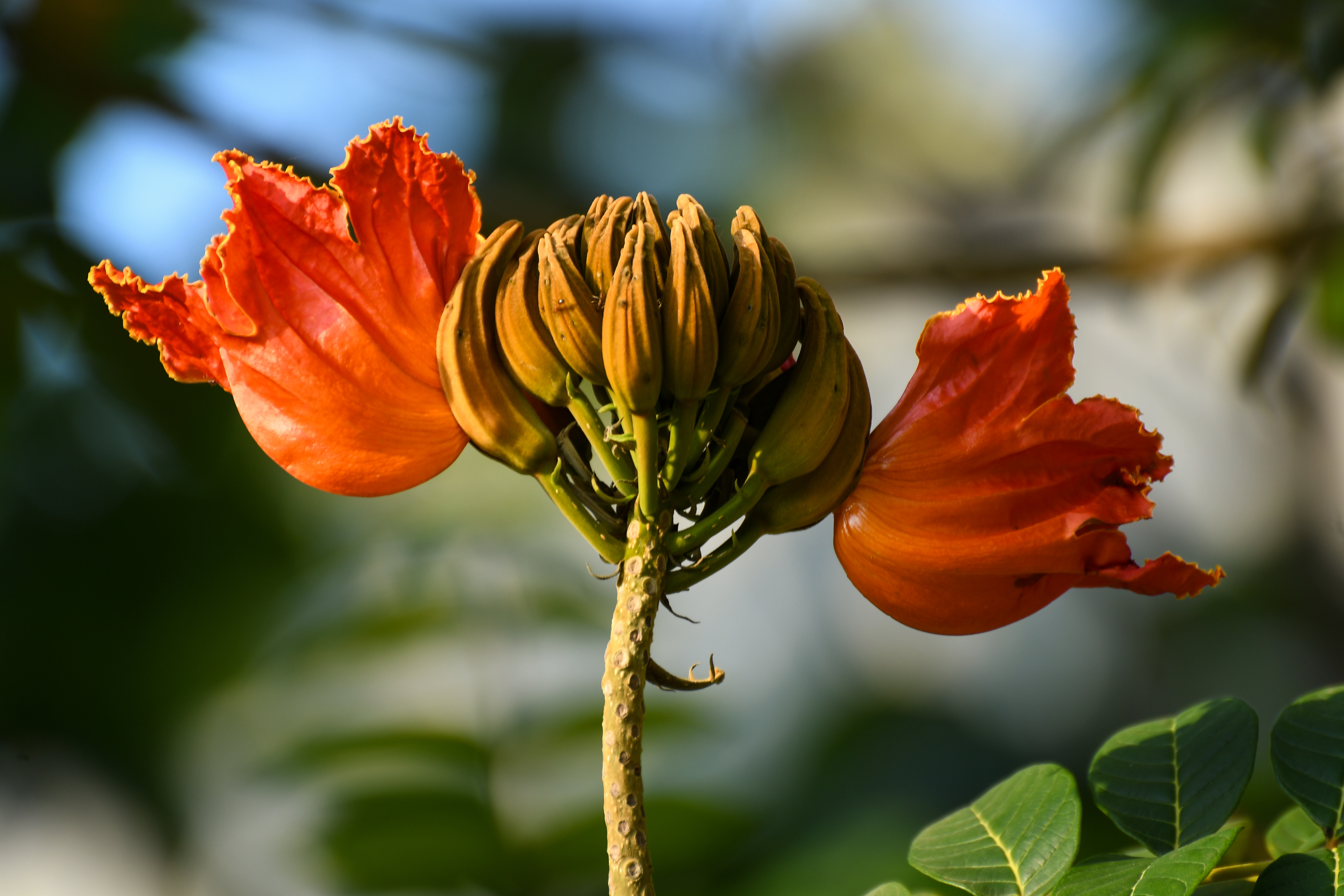
Buds

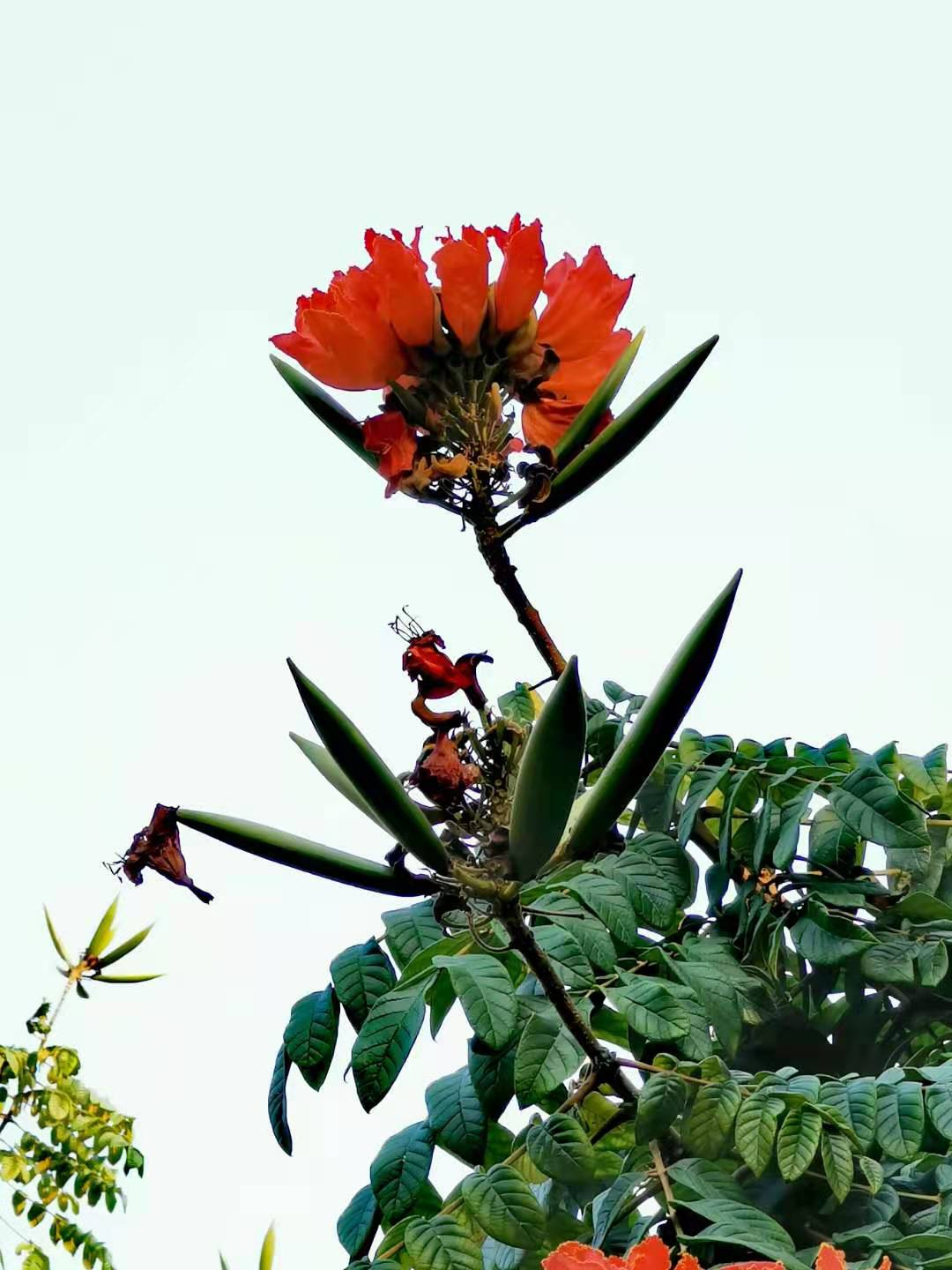
Fruits

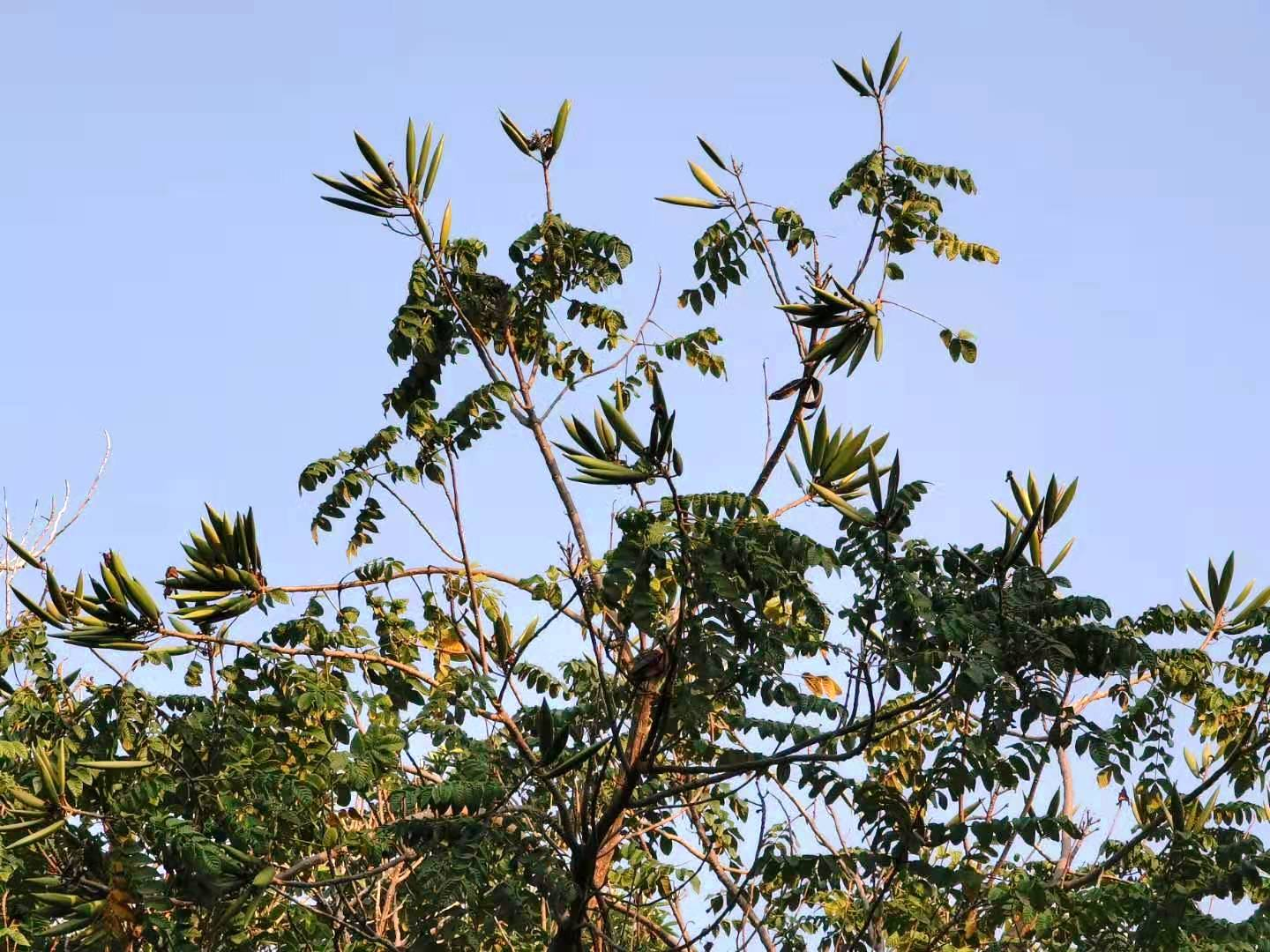
Fruits

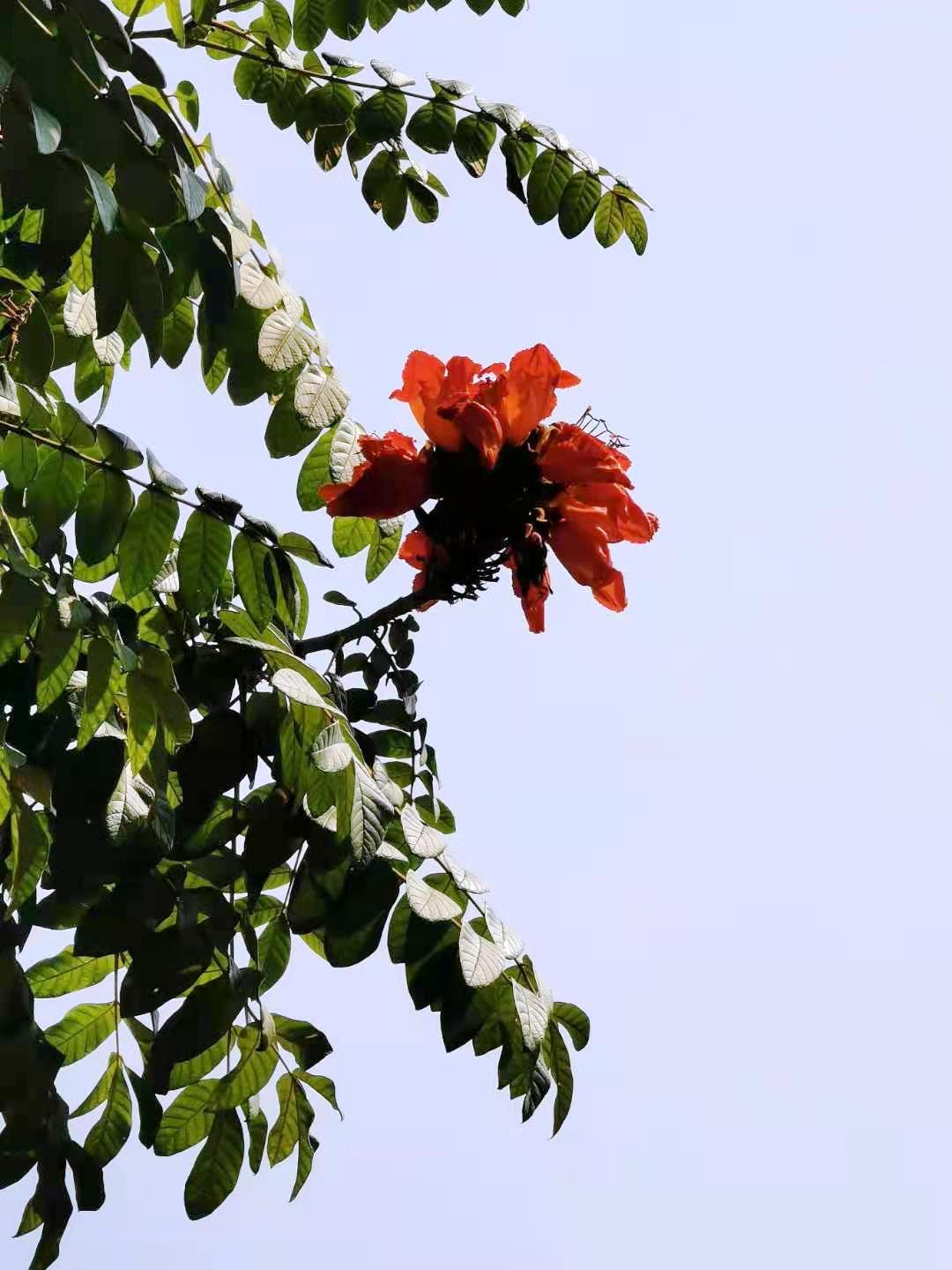
Phyllotaxy

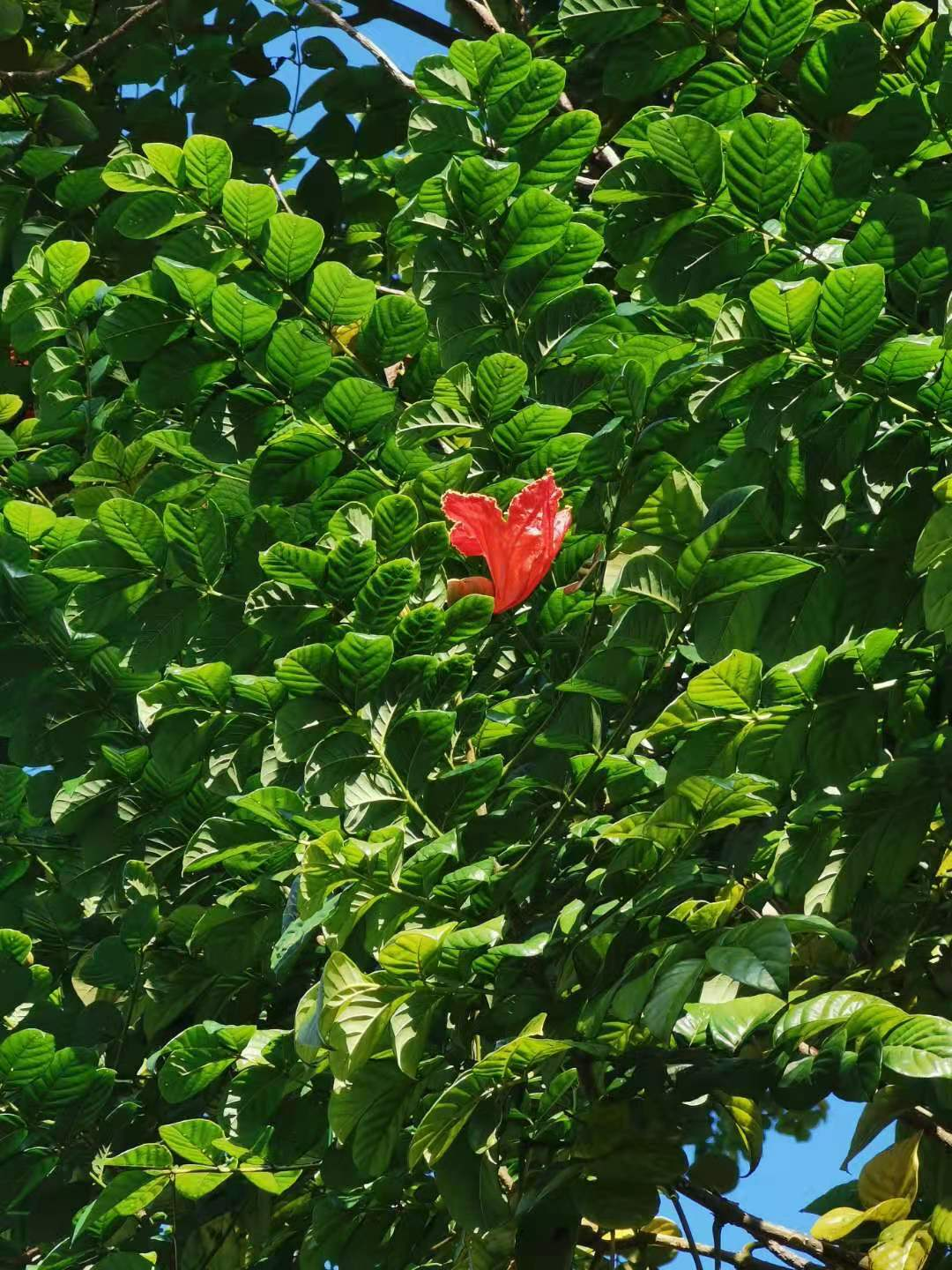
Leaves
