= Derrick Thomas (agricultural scientist) =

British agricultural researcher

Derrick Thomas (1944 – 13 May 2013) was a British agricultural researcher with special contributions to grassland and forage research in the tropics.

== Education and early professional life ==
Derrick Thomas was educated at the Universities of Wales (BSc Honours Agriculture), Oxford (D.Phil. Agricultural Science) and Queensland, Australia (D.T.A. postgraduate diploma in Tropical Pasture Science).

He initiated his professional career in 1971 in the first British Government research team in Malawi, where he developed new forage-based systems for small-scale beef production. After 4 years, he returned to the United Kingdom to become Lecturer in Tropical Animal Production at the University of Edinburgh.

== Professional life ==
Derrick Thomas spent large time of his researcher life in South America and Africa, devoted to research for pasture and forage improvement. From 1978 to 1989, he was a senior research scientist in the Tropical Pastures Program at the International Center for Tropical Agriculture (CIAT), one of the research centres under the Consultative Group on International Agricultural Research (CGIAR). He was first based in Brasília, Brazil and later in Cali, Colombia. While working in South America, Derrick Thomas published extensively on forage research, including several articles together with his CIAT colleague Bert Grof (see below).

In 1989, he was appointed Head of the Plant Sciences Division and Co-ordinator of the Feed Resources and Resource Use Programmes at the International Livestock Centre for Africa (ILCA, now the International Livestock Research Institute, ILRI) in Addis Ababa, Ethiopia, another CGIAR center. At ILCA he headed multi-disciplinary research teams in sustainable agriculture and natural resources management operating throughout sub-Saharan Africa.

In 1993, Derrick joined the Natural Resources Institute (NRI) of the Overseas Development Administration in the United Kingdom as Research Manager (Natural Resource Management Department). At the NRI, he undertook short-term consultancy work in Asia, Latin America and the Caribbean, the Middle East and sub-Saharan Africa. In 1997, he was elected a Fellow of the Society of Biology and, in 1999, he was appointed Professor of Tropical Agricultural Systems.

In 2012, he became a member of the editorial board of the scientific journal Tropical Grasslands – Forrajes Tropicales.

He died of pancreatic cancer in 2013.

== Selected bibliography ==
- De Andrade, R.P., Thomas, D., Ferguson, J.E., Costa, N.M.S. and Curado, T.F. 1981. Importancia da escolha de areas para a producao de sementes de forrageiras. Revista Brasileira de Sementes 3(1): 159–173. Available from: https://web.archive.org/web/20160304061221/http://www.abrates.org.br/revista/artigos/1981/v3n1/artigo14.pdf.
- Devendra, C. and Thomas, D. 2002a. Smallholder farming systems in Asia. Agricultural Systems 71(1): 17–25.
- Devendra, C. and Thomas, D. 2002b. Crop–animal interactions in mixed farming systems in Asia. Agricultural Systems 71(1): 27–40.
- Devendra, C. and Thomas, D. 2002c. Crop–animal systems in Asia: importance of livestock and characterisation of agro-ecological zones. Agricultural Systems 71(1): 5–15.
- Grof, B. and Thomas, D. 1990. The agronomy of Andropogon gayanus. In: Toledo, J.M., Vera, R., Lascano, C. and Lenné, J.M. (eds.). 1990. Andropogon gayanus Kunth: a grass for tropical acid soils. Centro Internacional de Agricultura Tropical (CIAT), Cali, Colombia. pp. 157–177.
- Grof, B., Thomas, D., de Andrade, R.P., Zoby, J.L.F. and de Souza, M.A. 1989c. Perennial legumes and grass-legume associations adapted to poorly drained savannas in tropical South America [Aeschynomene mainly]. Section 3: Forage plant breeding. Proceedings of the 16th International Grassland Congress, 4–11 Oct 1989, Nice, France. Association Francaise pour la Production Fourragere (AFPF), Versailles, France. pp. 189–190.
- Larbi, A., Thomas, D. and Hanson, J. 1993. Forage potential of Erythrina abyssinica: intake, digestibility and growth rates for stall-fed sheep and goats in southern Ethiopia. Agroforestry Systems 21(3): 263–270.
- Lascano, C.E. and Thomas, D. 1988. Forage quality and animal selection of Arachis pintoi in association with tropical grasses in the eastern plains of Colombia. Grass and Forage Science 43(4): 433–439.
- Lascano, C.E. and Thomas, D. 1990. Quality of Andropogon gayanus and animal productivity. In: Toledo, J.M., Vera, R., Lascano, C. and Lenné, J.M. (eds.). 1990. Andropogon gayanus Kunth: a grass for tropical acid soils. Centro Internacional de Agricultura Tropical (CIAT), Cali, Colombia.
- Lenné, J.M., Thomas, D., De Andrade, R.P. and Vargas, A. 1984. Anthracnose of Stylosanthes capitata: Implications for future disease evaluations of indigenous tropical pasture legumes. Phytopathology 74(9): 1070–1073.
- Lenné, J.M. and Thomas, D. 2006. Integrating crop-livestock research and development in Sub-Saharan Africa: Option, imperative or impossible?. Outlook on Agriculture 35(3): 167–175.
- Mendoza, P.E., Thomas, D., Spain, J.M. and Lascano, C.E. 1990. Establishment and management of Centrosema pastures. Centrosema: Biology, agronomy and utilisation. R. Schultze-Kraft and R.J. Clements (eds.). CIAT Publication no. 92, CIAT, Cali, Colombia. pp. 271–292.
- Romney, D.L., Thorne, P.J. and Thomas, D. 1994. Some animal-related factors influencing the cycling of nitrogen in mixed farming systems in sub-Saharan Africa. Agriculture, Ecosystems & Environment 49(2): 163–172.
- Thomas, D. 1976. Effects of close grazing on the productivity and persistence of tropical legumes with Rhodes grass in Malawi [sheep]. Tropical Agriculture 53.
- Thomas, D. 1984. Global ventures in Stylosanthes. I. South America. The biology and agronomy of Stylosanthes. pp. 451–466.
- Thomas, D. and Lapointe, S.L. 1999. Testing new accessions of Guinea Grass (Panicum maximum) for acid soils and resistance to spittlebug (Aeneolamia reducta). Tropical Grasslands 23: 232–239.
- Thomas, D. 1999. Increasing livestock productivity in mixed crop-livestock systems in South Asia: Proceedings of the planning workshop of regional stakeholders, ICRISAT, India, 15–17 November 1999. Patancheru, India: ICRISAT. Available from: https://hdl.handle.net/10568/116.
- Thomas, D. and De Andrade, R.P. 1984. The persistence of tropical grass-legume associations under grazing in Brazil. The Journal of Agricultural Science 102(02): 257–263.
- Thomas, D. and De Andrade, R.P. 1986. The evaluation under grazing of legumes associated with Andropogon gayanus in a tropical savannah environment on the central plateau of Brazil. Journal of Agricultural Science (Cambridge) 107: 37–41.
- Thomas, D. and Diaz, F. 1989. Caracterización de accesiones de Stylosanthes scabra en los Llanos Orientales de Colombia. Pasturas Tropicales
- Thomas, D. and Grof, B. 1986. Some pasture species for the tropical savannas of South America. 1. Species of Stylosanthes. Herbage Abstracts 56(10): 445–454.
- Thomas, D. and Schultze-Kraft, R. 1990. Evaluation of five shrubby legumes in comparison with Centrosema acutifolium, Carimagua, Colombia. Tropical Grasslands 24(2): 87–92.
- Thomas, D. and Sumberg, J.E. 1995. A review of the evaluation and use of tropical forage legumes in sub-Saharan Africa. Agriculture, Ecosystems and Environment 54(3): 151–163.
- Thomas, D., Andrade, R.P. de and Grof, B. 1985. Problems experienced with forage legumes in a tropical savanna environment in Brazil. In: Proceedings of the 15th International Grassland Congress, 1985, Kyoto, Japan. The Science Council of Japan / Japanese Society of Grassland Science. pp. 144–146.
- Thomas, D., Zerbini, E., Parthasarathy Rao, P. and Vaidyanathan, A. 2002. Increasing animal productivity on small mixed farms in South Asia: A systems perspective. Agricultural Systems 71(1): 41–57.
