= Joseph Aloysius Sheehy =

Australian judge (1900–1971)

The Honourable Sir Joseph Sheehy KBE
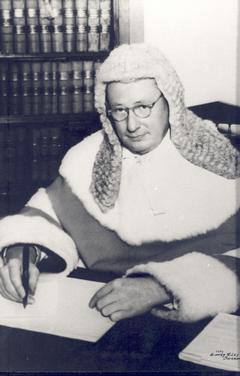

Senior Puisne Judge of Queensland
- In office 1965–1970

Administrator of Queensland
- In office February 1965 – March 1965
- In office July 1965 – December 1965
- In office July 1969 – October 1969

Personal details
- Born: Joseph Aloysius Sheehy Gympie, Queensland, Australia
- Spouse(s): Elizabeth Groves, Lady Sheehy
- Children: Gabriel Joseph Sheehy
- Parent(s): Jeremiah and Kate (O'Driscoll) Sheehy

Sir Joseph Aloysius Sheehy KBE (15 April 1900 – 22 September 1971) was an Australian jurist and Senior Puisne Judge of the Queensland Supreme Court. He also served as Administrator of the Government of Queensland in 1965 and 1969, and as Queensland's Lieutenant-Governor, Deputy Governor, Acting Governor and Acting Chief Justice on several occasions.

== Background, family and education ==
Sheehy was born in Gympie, Queensland, the son of goldmines manager Jeremiah and Kate (née O'Driscoll) Sheehy. He was educated at the Christian Brothers School, Gympie, and at St Joseph's College, Gregory Terrace, Brisbane. In 1927, Sheehy married Elizabeth Groves. They had one child, Gabriel Joseph "Joe" Sheehy, a civil and structural engineer, and five grandchildren, Gayle Sheehy, Marina Birmingham, Brett Sheehy AO, Petrina Sheehy and Matthew Sheehy.

Sheehy's brother and sister also served the State. His brother Sir Christopher Sheehy OBE was Secretary of Queensland's Wheat Board, Butter Board and Council of Agriculture, and chair of the Australian Dairy Board, and his sister, Kathleen Sheehy, was a champion of special education in Queensland, being instrumental in renaming State education classes for children with disabilities from 'backward classes' to 'opportunity classes,' and was appointed head of the State's first ever Opportunity school (later renamed Special schools). Sheehy's brother-in-law, Lieutenant Charles Groves (one of the legendary wartime "Rats of Tobruk"), also practised law in Queensland, being admitted as a barrister and solicitor and co-founding the law firm of Groves and Clark Solicitors, before the outbreak of the Second World War in which he was ultimately killed in the Battle of Milne Bay, New Guinea.

== Early legal career ==
Sheehy worked at the Queensland Department of Justice from 1916 to 1919 and the Crown Solicitor's Office from 1919 to 1922. On 4 October 1921, at the age of 21 Sheehy was admitted as a barrister of the Supreme Court of Queensland, and was at the time the youngest barrister in the British Empire. In 1928, Sheehy left the Crown Solicitor's Office to practice privately at the Bar. Throughout this period, he continued to be retained as a crown prosecutor, and from 1932 to 1947 was also a member of the Incorporated Council of Law Reporting.

== Supreme Court ==
In September 1947, Sheehy was appointed a Justice of the Supreme Court of Queensland and became the Court's Central Judge, based at Rockhampton. On 15 April 1965, he was appointed Senior Puisne Judge of the Supreme Court and transferred to Brisbane. During his tenure as a Supreme Court Justice, in February 1953 the Queensland Premier appointed Sheehy to chair the Valuations Board of Review, set up to assess 140,000 land valuations across 39 towns and shires including the capital of Brisbane, and from 1954 to 1956 Sheehy also conducted the Royal Commission into the Government Coal Mine Disaster at Collinsville. Sheehy served as the State's Senior Puisne Judge until his retirement in 1970. While Senior Puisne Judge, Sheehy was variously appointed Lieutenant-Governor, Deputy Governor, Acting Governor and Acting Chief Justice several times in the absence or incapacitation of the Chief Justice or Governor.

== Administrator of Queensland ==
In 1965 Sheehy was appointed Administrator of the State of Queensland when Governor Sir Henry Abel Smith was appointed Administrator of the Commonwealth of Australia. It was a position Sheehy had occupied earlier when Abel Smith was abroad. Sheehy was again appointed Administrator of Queensland in 1969 when Governor Sir Alan Mansfield was absent from Australia for a lengthy period.

== Awards and honours ==
In June 1953, Sheehy was awarded the Queen Elizabeth II Coronation Medal.

On 13 June 1970, Sheehy was appointed a Knight Commander of the Order of the British Empire (KBE) in the Queen's Birthday Honours, and on 19 June 1970 Queen Elizabeth II additionally decreed his retention of the title "The Honourable", making his full title "The Honourable Sir Joseph Aloysius Sheehy KBE".

In 2004 at the State Law Building in Brisbane, chambers of the Director of Public Prosecutions were named "Sheehy Chambers" in honour of Sheehy, and streets in the Australian cities of Rockhampton, Brisbane (Stafford) and Canberra (Evatt) have also been named after Sheehy.

== Death, funeral and tributes ==
Sheehy died at Buderim, Queensland on 22 September 1971. He was accorded a State funeral held at Cathedral of St Stephen, Brisbane which was attended by Federal and State politicians, members of the judiciary (including 18 judges and 40 barristers), police and armed services. The Prime Minister, the Governor, the Premier and the Leader of the Opposition were all represented. The Chief Justice noted in his eulogy that as well as his outstanding skill and rigour as a jurist, Sheehy's "kindness, urbanity and readiness to help others made him much loved." The 50-vehicle official funeral cortège and motorcade, led by a procession of mounted police, passed through a final honour guard of 1,000 students from his old school of Gregory Terrace, after winding through the city streets of Brisbane where people paused to pay their last respects to one of the most admired and beloved jurists in the State's history.

In 1972, Sheehy's widow Lady (Elizabeth) Sheehy established the annual "The Honourable Sir Joseph Sheehy KBE Memorial Prize" at Gregory Terrace (of which Sheehy was Dux in 1915), an award continued after her death by their son Gabriel Joseph "Joe" Sheehy. In 1974, at the invitation of Gregory Terrace, Lady Sheehy christened the new First Eight boat of Gregory Terrace's rowing fleet the Sir Joseph Sheehy, and in 1975 the boat was coxed at the annual Head of the River (Queensland) GPS regatta by Sheehy's grandson Brett Sheehy.
