= Grona ovalifolia =

Scientific classification
- Kingdom: Plantae
- Clade: Embryophytes
- Clade: Tracheophytes
- Clade: Spermatophytes
- Clade: Angiosperms
- Clade: Eudicots
- Clade: Rosids
- Order: Fabales
- Family: Fabaceae
- Subfamily: Faboideae
- Genus: Grona
- Species: G. ovalifolia

Binomial name
- Grona ovalifolia (Prain) H.Ohashi & K.Ohashi & Tagane

Synonyms
- Desmodium heterocarpon var. ovalifolium (Prain) Rugayah; Desmodium heterocarpon subsp. ovalifolium (Prain) H.Ohashi; Desmodium ovalifolium (Prain) Wall. ex Ridl.; Desmodium polycarpon var. ovalifolium Prain; Grona heterocarpos subsp. ovalifolia (Prain) H.Ohashi & K.Ohashi

Species of plant

Grona ovalifolia, the oval-leaf tick trefoil, is a species of flowering plant in the family Fabaceae. It is native to Myanmar, Southeast Asia, southeastern China, western and central Malesia, and the Philippines. An annual creeping subshrub reaching 2 ft (60 cm), it is typically found in wet areas. First described by Wallich as Desmodium ovalifolium, it has been subject to taxonomic confusion.
