= Queensland State Soils Collection =

The Queensland State Soils Collection is a Queensland Government scientific collection based in Queensland, Australia. The collection is a component of the Queensland Government's response to the need to understand the properties of soil across the state.

Samples within the Queensland State Soils Collection represent most of the major soil types and regions of Queensland and have associated morphology, physical and chemistry data recorded and stored digitally. This data is available through the Queensland Globe Soil and Landscape information (SALI) database.

The nature of the collection lends itself for various scientific usage, including an evolving understanding of the ecology of the Queensland landscape and its natural resources.

According to the Queensland Government, the Queensland State Soils Collection supports activities integral to the:

- Biosecurity Act 2015
- Environment Protection and Biodiversity Conservation Act 1999
- Soil Survey Act 1929

== History and current use ==
The samples in the collection represent various soil assessment and monitoring programs from across the state since 1978. Prior to 1978, samples were often discarded, resulting in the loss of the opportunity for re-analysis to answer new questions, such as a benchmark for soil health in a changing climate and as a repository of potentially unknown therapeutic compounds.

The largest part of the Queensland State Soils Collection is physically held at a storage facility in Brisbane, but smaller collections can also be found in Toowoomba, Rockhampton and Mareeba. The main collection consists of over 120,000 individual soil samples that are air-dried and sieved with a 2mm sieve, which is consistent with international soil sampling methodology.

== Significance of collection ==
The collection has been integral to one of the largest scale projects to improve the water quality in the Great Barrier Reef – the Paddock to Reef monitoring project. It is a collaborative program between the Queensland Government, industry in Queensland, and the local community to identify the sources of pollution in water runoff that flows into the Great Barrier Reef and take appropriate action through best practice farm management. As part of the project, soils in the Great Barrier Reef catchments are collected and stored as part of the Queensland State Soils Collection. These soils provide an important snapshot of the situation at a given moment in time and therefore act as a benchmark for the planned future improvement of the region. Together with river and reef water analysis, these data points provide a full picture that allows the creation of soil and water quality maps which allow policymakers to make targeted decisions.
