= List of common weeds of Queensland =

There are a number of commonly occurring weeds or invasive plant species in Queensland, Australia. These plants typically produce large numbers of seeds, often excellent at surviving and reproducing in disturbed environments and are commonly the first species to colonise and dominate in these conditions. Weeds may reduce native biodiversity, affect agricultural productivity, the environment, human health and amenity.

== Common weeds ==
Some of the more common weeds of Queensland are listed below. Weeds that are not yet common or established but pose a significant threat are identified by an asterisk. Weeds that are identified as Weeds of National Significance are noted as "WoNS".

Common name	Scientific name	Origin	Description	Signif- icance	Primary Distribution	Image	Ref.
African tulip tree	Spathodea campanulata	tropical Africa	Fast growing, highly invasive, evergreen tree forming dense stands in gullies and streams, crowding out native vegetation	Class 3	SE Qld and gardens		
Alligator Weed*	Alternanthera philoxeroides	South America	Grows on land in damp soil, or in water as dense floating mats	Class 1 WoNS	Potential to establish in all Queensland coastal areas and inland agricultural and urban areas		
Camphor laurel	Cinnamomum camphora	Asia	Large attractive shade tree, aggressively replaces native vegetation	Class 3	Gardens throughout Qld		
Fireweed	Senecio madagascariensis	Madagascar, Southern Africa	Daisy-like herb with bright yellow flowers, competes with pasture species	Class 2	New South Wales coast and north to Brisbane		
Lantana	Lantana camara	Central, South America	Heavily branched shrub that can grow as compact clumps, dense thickets and as scrambling and climbing vines that smother native vegetation	Class 3 WoNS	Most coastal and sub-coastal areas of eastern Australia		
Mesquite	Prosopis spp.	North, South America	Spread significantly in Queensland, may form dense impenetrable thickets, aggressive competitor and drought tolerant	Class 1 WoNS	Western Qld		
Mother of millions	Bryophyllum spp.	Madagascar	Succulent type plant well adapted to dry areas, highly toxic to stock, forms masses of embryoids (plantlets), hard to eradicate	Class 2	Ornamental garden plant, Central Highlands, Burnett		
Ochna (aka Mickey Mouse plant)	Ochna serrulata	Africa	Ornamental species, easily dispersed to new areas by birds eating the fruits	n/a	Widely planted in gardens		
Parkinsonia	Parkinsonia aculeata	tropical America	Introduced ornamental small shade tree, seeds float, forms dense, thorny thickets along watercourses	Class 2 WoNS	inland Qld		
Parthenium	Parthenium hysterophorus	tropical America	Vigorous coloniser of weak pastures, disturbed areas, brigalow, gidgee and softwood scrub soils. Linked to health allergies	Class 2 WoNS	predominantly Central Qld		
Prickly pear	Opuntia spp.	Americas	Spiky cactus, drought resistant, widespread infestation in early 20th century but reduced through biological control	Class 2	Central, Southern Qld		
Willow	Salix spp.	Northern hemisphere	Popular garden ornamentals, but invasive in waterways with aggressive root systems	Class 1 WoNS	Cooler parts of Qld		

== See also ==
- Introduced species
- Invasion biology terminology for a review of the terminology used in invasion biology.
- Invasive species in Australia
- List of invasive species
- Queensland
- Weed Science
