= Henry Thomas (disambiguation) =

Henry Thomas (born 1971) is an American actor.

Henry Thomas may also refer to:

- Henry Thomas (blues musician) (1874–1930?), American country blues singer and musician
- Henry Thomas (sprinter) (born 1967), American sprinter
- Henry Thomas (American football) (born 1965), former defensive tackle in the National Football League
- Henry Thomas (suspected combustion death) (1907–1980)
- Henry F. Thomas (1843–1912), U.S. representative from Michigan
- Henry Thomas (MP), UK MP for the Irish constituency of Kinsale, 1835–1837 and 1838–1841
- Henry Thomas (boxer) (1888–1963), British Olympic boxer
- Henry Thomas (miller) (1866–1928), owner of flour mill in South Australia
- Henry Thomas (rugby union) (born 1991), rugby union player who has represented both England and Wales
- Henry Atwell Thomas (1834–1904), American draftsman
- Henry Goddard Thomas (1837–1897), Union general in the American Civil War
- Henry Thomas (1878–1952), English Hispanic scholar and bibliographer
- Henry Haberfield Thomas (1886–1918), English aircraft designer
- Hank Thomas (Henry James Thomas, born 1941), American civil rights activist
- Henry Wirtz Thomas (1812–1890), lieutenant governor of Virginia
- Henry T. Schnittkind (1888–1970), American author who wrote as Henry Thomas
- Henry Dighton Thomas (1900–1966), geologist and academic at the University of Cambridge

== See also ==
- Henri Thomas (1912–1993), French writer and poet
- Henri Joseph Thomas (1878–1972), Belgian painter, sculptor and etcher
- Henri Thomas (cyclist) (1905-1937), French cyclist
- Harry Thomas (disambiguation)
- Thomas Henry (disambiguation)
