= Thomas-Henry =

Thomas-Henry may refer to:

- Musée Thomas-Henry, art museum in Cherbourg-en-Cotentin, France
- Thomas-Henry Scheemakers, London-based sculptor
- Shanel Thomas-Henry, American politician

== See also ==
- Thomas Henry (disambiguation)
