= Jules Brunfaut =

Belgian architect

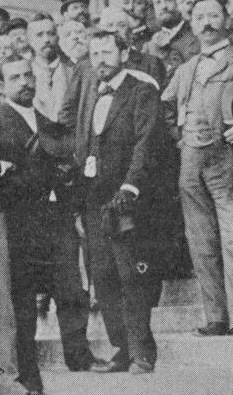
- Born: 16 November 1852 Brussels, Belgium
- Died: 4 January 1942 (aged 89) Brussels, Belgium
- Education: University of Ghent; Academy of Fine Arts, Brussels; Ecole des Beaux-Arts, Paris
- Spouse: Victorine Castaigne

Jules Brunfaut (Brussels, 16 November 1852 – 4 January 1942) was a Belgian architect and engineer who worked around the turn of the twentieth century. He is best known perhaps for the Hôtel Hannon, a residence for photographer and engineer Édouard Hannon, which is, ironically, his only building designed in the Art Nouveau style.

== Biography ==
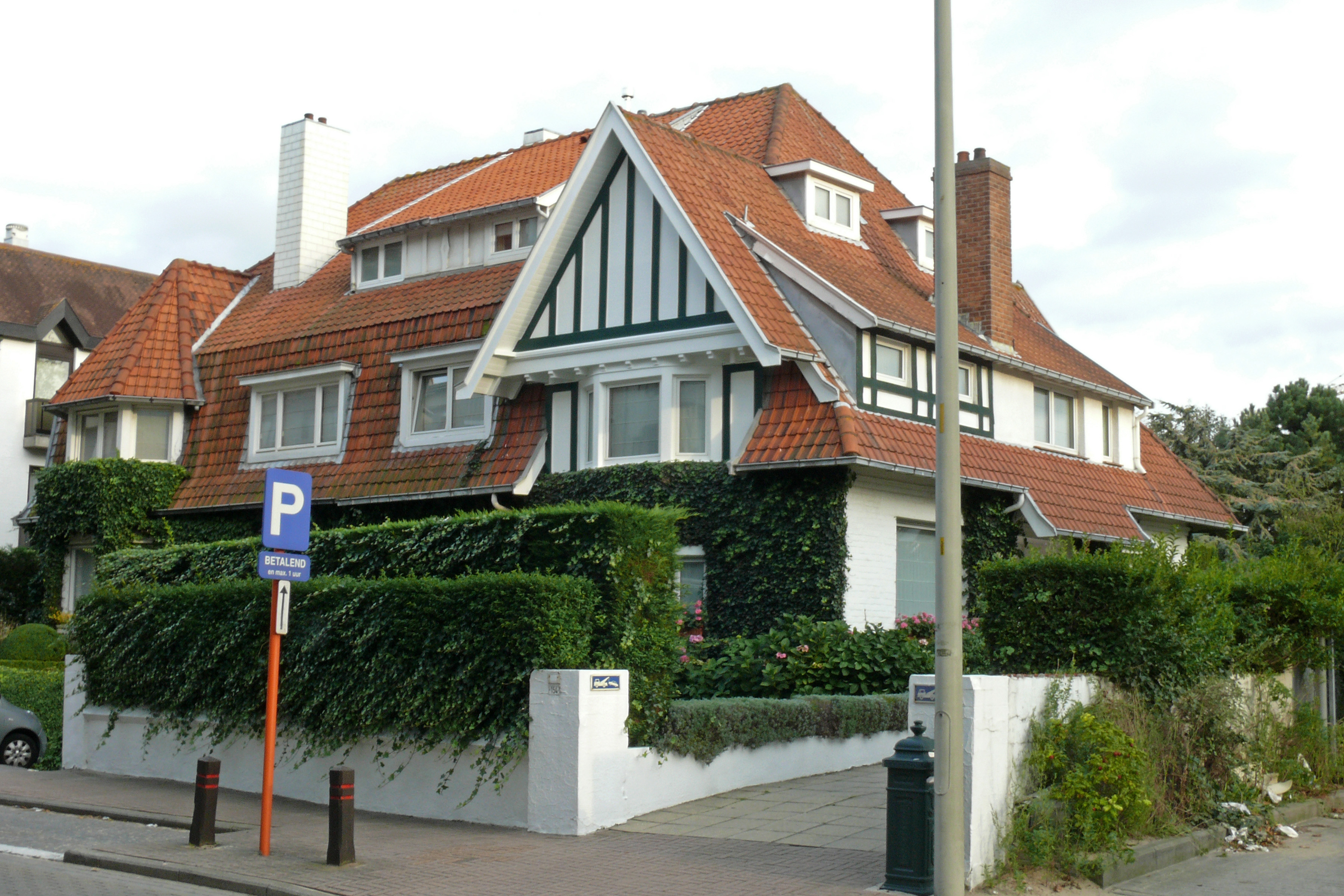
"Cemana", a duplex villa in Knokke-Heist, Belgium, designed by Jules Brunfaut.

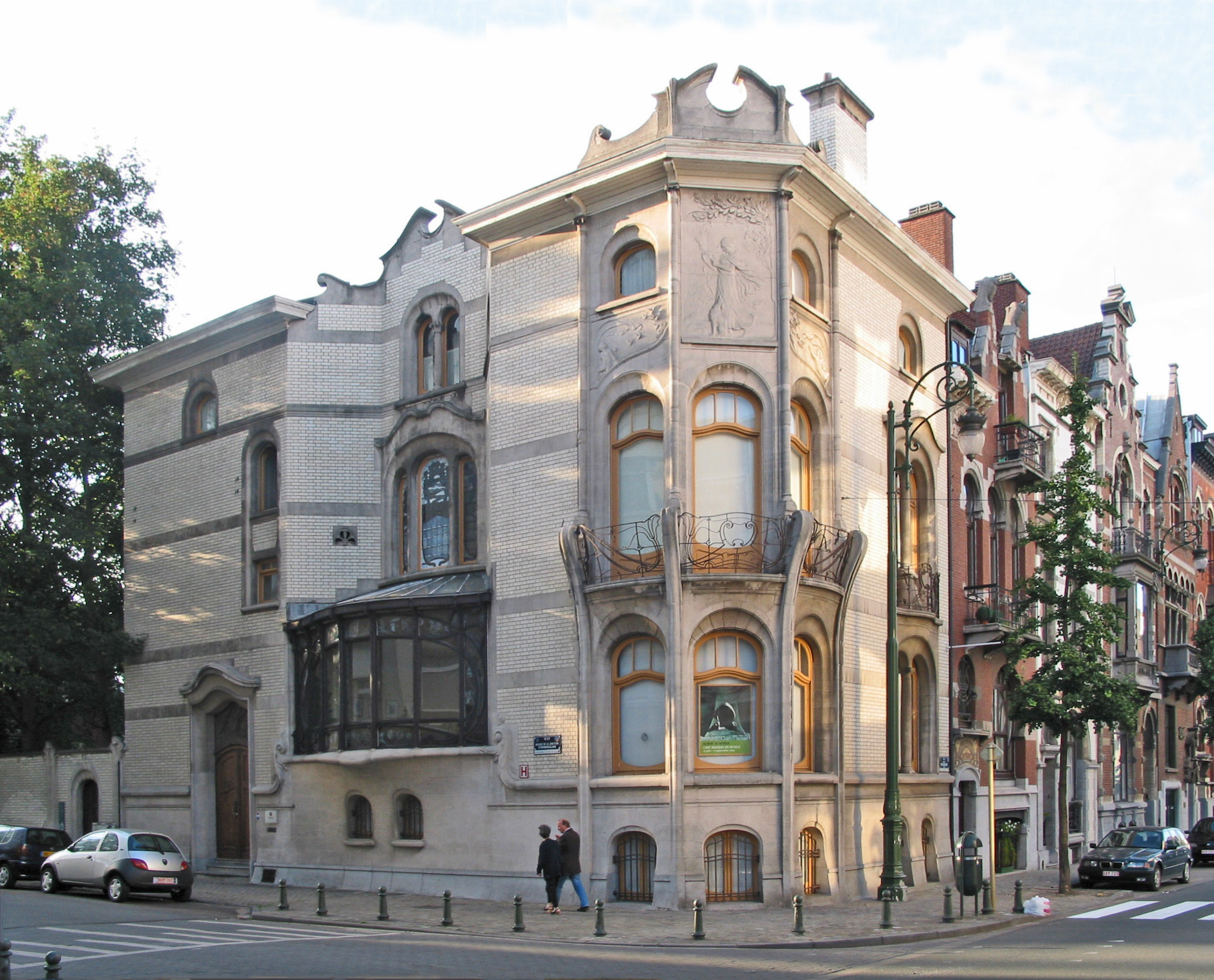
The Hôtel Hannon, in Saint-Gilles (Brussels), is Brunfaut's most famous work.

Jules Brunfaut was born in Brussels on 16 November 1852. The descendant of a Walloon family originating in Tournai and based in Ypres, he completed high school at the Royal Athénée in Brussels. Brunfaut then followed the courses of the School of Civil Engineering of the University of Ghent.

Afterwards, he moved to Brussels. While following the courses of Félix Laureys (1820–1897) at the Academy of Fine Arts from 1873 to 1879, he completed four years of professional practice with the architect Henri Beyaert, one of the leading eclectic designers in Belgium, of whom he wrote a biographical sketch in 1908.

In 1879, after receiving a scholarship from the Belgian government to the laureates to encourage the decorative arts, Brunfaut chose to attend the École des Beaux-Arts in Paris to acquire a knowledge of the conceptions of the past. Here, he met some of his friends from the Académie royale des beaux-arts de Bruxelles, such as Ernest Acker, George De Larabie, and Oscar Raquez, who gave him the curriculum for the classes since he was a free student. From 1879 to 1881, he followed the courses of the architect Henri Magne, of Taigne, the draftsman and engraver Charles Blanc and Henri Mahieu.

Brunfaut enriched his knowledge during trips to Florence, Rome, and Venice, along with the Sicilian cities of Agrigento, Selinunte, Palermo, and Monreale from 1881 to 1882. He would bring back sketchbooks that would serve as his repertoire of decorative motifs from these trips, along with details of elements of the Renaissance and Antiquity.

In 1889, a certain J. Burnay asked Brunfaut to undertake the restoration of the "Quinta do Trinidade" in Seixal, Portugal, and for the construction of his house in Lisbon. Brunfaut moved to Portugal, where he constructed the hotel of a Mr. L. Ribeiro and built the art gallery of Count Daupias.

Upon his return to Brussels, Brunfaut received numerous commissions for bourgeois houses, mansions, castles, villas, utility buildings, industrial buildings for Solvay factories, and exhibition pavilions in Belgium and abroad from 1880 to 1919.

Brunfaut's most famous work, however, is the Hôtel Hannon in Saint-Gilles, a suburb of Brussels, which he built for his close friend Édouard Hannon (1853–1931). Hannon wanted an Art Nouveau-style house, and Brunfaut obliged, although he had no experience designing anything in Art Nouveau, and the resultant house has a kind of clumsiness about it, contrasting with the harmonious work of, for example, Victor Horta. The house was the longtime home of the photography center Contretype, which moved out in 2014. In 2023, it reopened as a historic house museum under the auspices of the Horta Museum.

Brunfaut closed his office about 1920 in order to travel with his wife, Victorine Castaigne (1867–1930), along with his three daughters, and to devote himself to his writings and at the meetings of the commissions of which he was a member. Brunfaut died in his mansion on the avenue Molière in Brussels, after a prolonged illness on 4 January 1942.

He was a member of the Académie royale des sciences, des lettres et des beaux-arts de Belgique, Fine Arts Class.

== Bibliography ==
- Dictionnaire de l'architecture en Belgique
- Marcel M. Celis, L'Hôtel Hannon. Brussels: Contretype, 2003.
- Françoise Jurion, "Brunfaut, Jules", in Dictionnaire d'Histoire de Bruxelles, Bruxelles, 2013, p. 129.
- Dominique Bonnet, Jules Brunfaut 1852-1942, Mémoire présenté en vue de l'obtention du grade légal d'architecte auprès de l'Instititut Supérieur d'Architecture de l'État (ISAE, La Cambre), Bruxelles, 1985.
