= Paul Lauters =

Belgian printmaker and painter

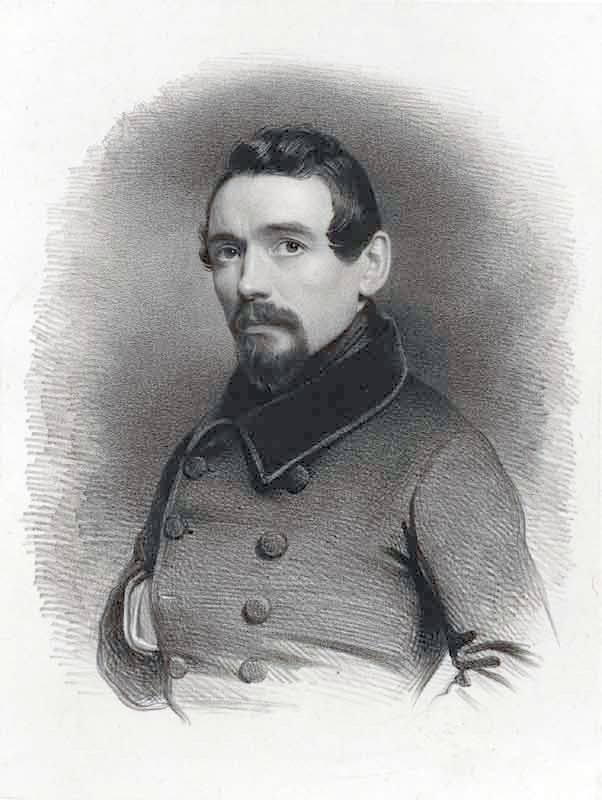
- Portrait of Paul Lauters (1842) by Charles Baugniet
- Born: Paul Lauters; 16 August 1806; Brussels, France (now Brlgium)
- Died: 12 November 1875 (aged 69); Brussels, Belgium
- Education: Académie Royale des Beaux-Arts
- Occupation: Painter

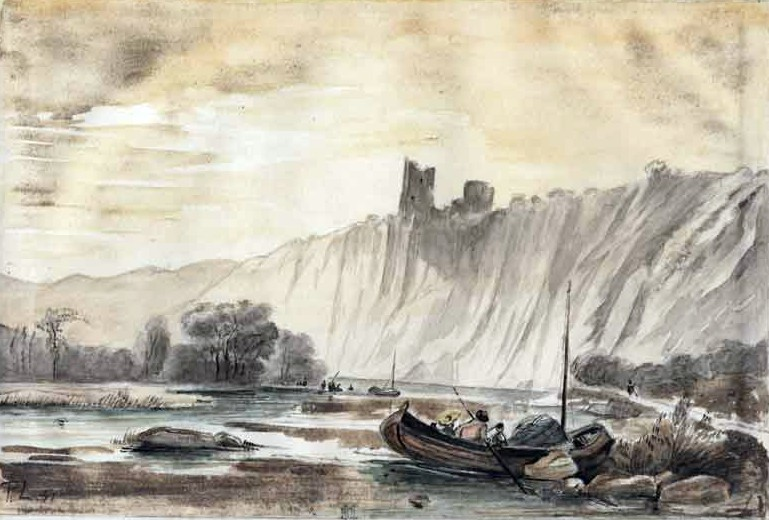
Paul Lauters, Ruines du Château de Montfort à Esneux, 1841

Paul Lauters or Paul Lauteri (16 July 1806, Brussels – 12 November 1875, Brussels), was a Belgian printmaker, illustrator and painter.

Lauters studied under the sculptor Charles Malaise (1775–1836) at the Académie Royale des Beaux-Arts from 1820 to 1823. From 1823 he worked for the Goubau & Dewasme-Plétinckx lithographic company at the same time as Jean-Baptiste Madou. In 1836 he taught at the École Royale de Gravure. He collaborated with the painter Théodore Fourmois in 1839, producing images of the abbey ruins at Villers-la-Ville. In 1840 Lauters produced illustrations for Les Aventures de Till Eulenspiegel and for Les Aventures de Jean-Paul Choppart. During this period François Stroobant was his student. In 1846 Lauters illustrated Le Juif errant. In 1848 he was appointed professor at the Académie des Beaux-Arts of Brussels. He illustrated several popular books including Les Environs de Bruxelles (12 lithographs) and La Légende de Thyl Uilenspiegel (woodcuts, 1868) by Charles de Coster. About 1872 Amédée Lynen (1852–1938) was his student. In 1874 he published Principes de paysages.

== Career timeline ==
- 1820 : Enrolled at the Académie des Beaux-Arts de Bruxelles. He studied in the workshop of Charles Malaise
- 1836 : Teaches at l'Ecole royale de gravure. He works with the printer and lithographer Gouban & Dewasme-Pletinckx
- 1840 : Drawings for The Adventures of Till Eulenspiegel and Les Aventures de Jean-Paul Choppart. During this period François Stroobant is his pupil
- 1846: Drawings for "The Wandering Jew (Le Juif errant)."
- 1848: Appointed professor at the Académie des Beaux-Arts de Bruxelles
- 1868: Founding member of the avant-gardist Société Libre des Beaux-Arts in Brussels
- c1872 : Amédée Lynen is his student

== Sources ==
- P. & V. Berko, "Dictionary of Belgian painters born between 1750 & 1875", Knokke 1981, p. 407.
