= François Stroobant =

Belgian painter

- Born: François Stroobant; 14 May 1819; Brussels, United Kingdom of the Netherlands
- Died: 1 May 1916 (aged 96); Ixelles, Belgium
- Education: Brussels Académie des Beaux-Arts
- Occupations: Painter and lithographer

François Stroobant (14 June 1819 Brussels – 1 June 1916 Ixelles) was a Belgian painter and lithographer, and brother of the lithographer Louis-Constantin Stroobant (1814–1872) noted for his part in Flore des Serres et des Jardins de l'Europe.

He attended the Brussels Académie des Beaux-Arts between 1832 and 1847, studying under François-Joseph Navez, Paul Lauters and François-Antoine Bossuet (1798–1889). In 1835 he worked in the studio of the lithographer Antoine Dewasme-Plétinckx (1797-1851) in Brussels.

Stroobant's subjects were mainly landscapes and architecture. He travelled extensively through the Netherlands, France, Germany, Switzerland, Italy, Spain and Hungary, exhibiting in the galleries of the Belgian towns Ghent, Antwerp and Brussels. His romantic painting style stayed constant throughout his career. He was founder and first director in 1865 of the Académie des Beaux-Arts at Molenbeek-Saint-Jean in Brussels.

In 1878 he was made an Officer in the Order of Leopold.

== Selected paintings ==
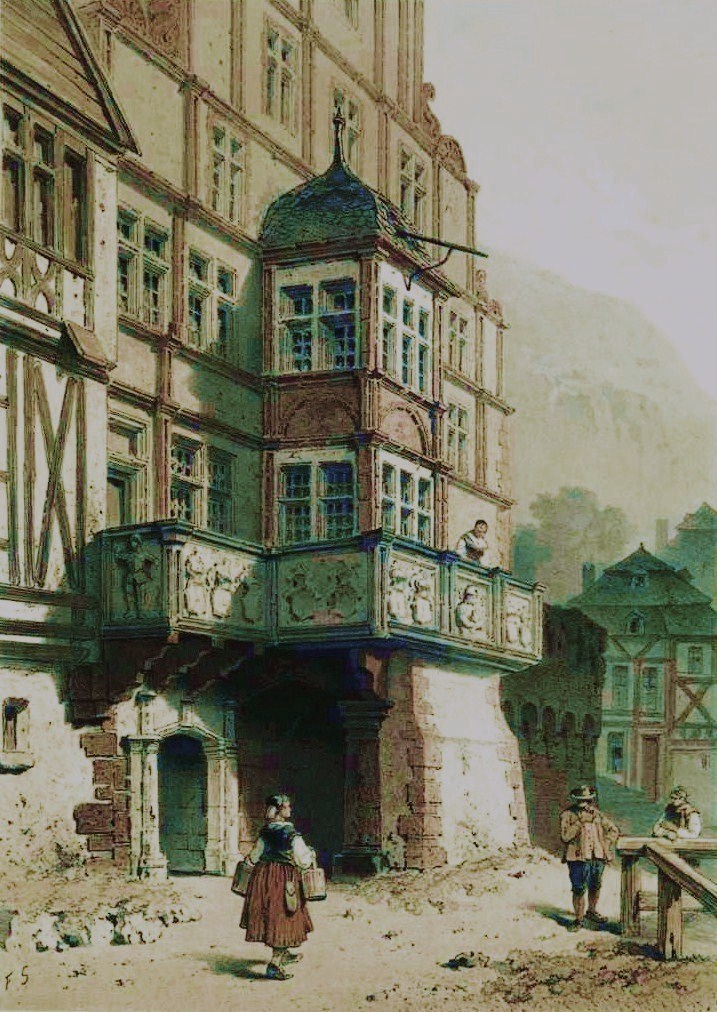
The Hilchenhaus in Lorch

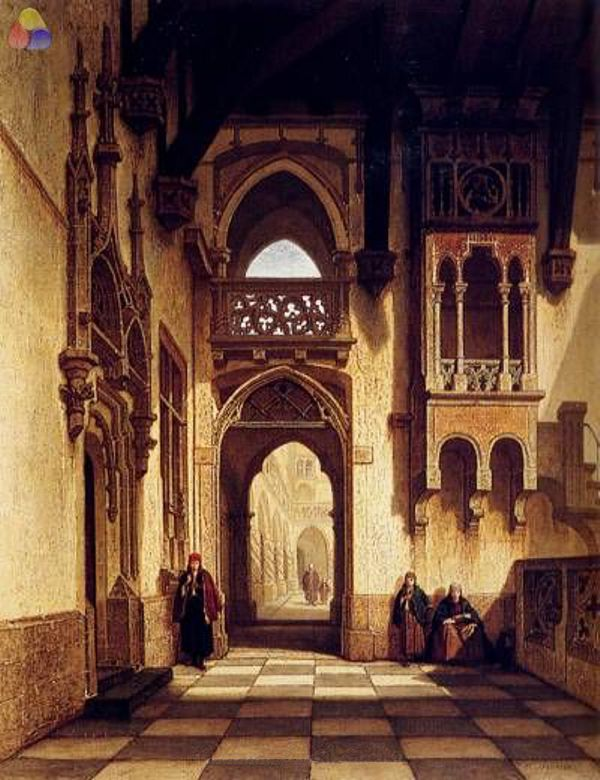
Palace of Casimir, King of Poland

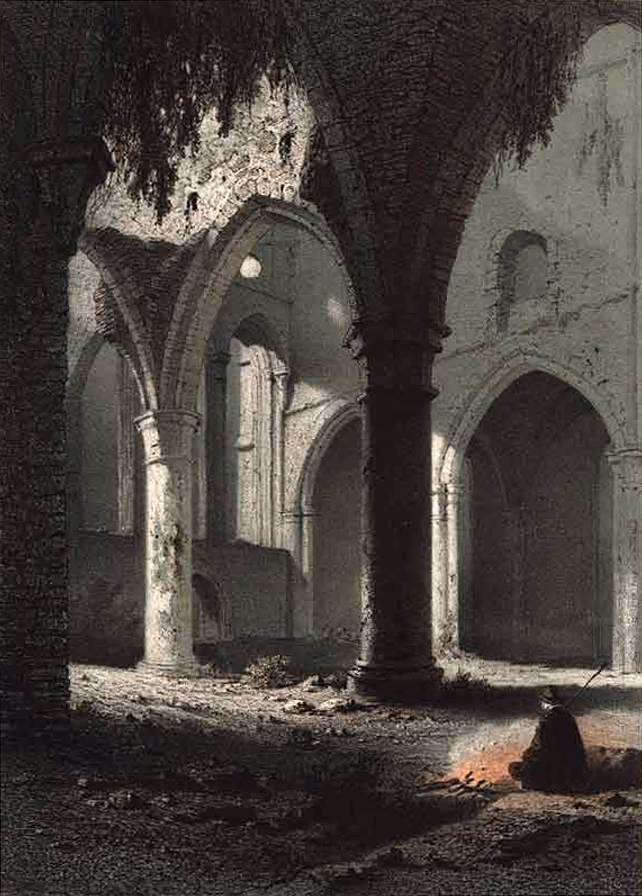
Ruins of Villers Abbey

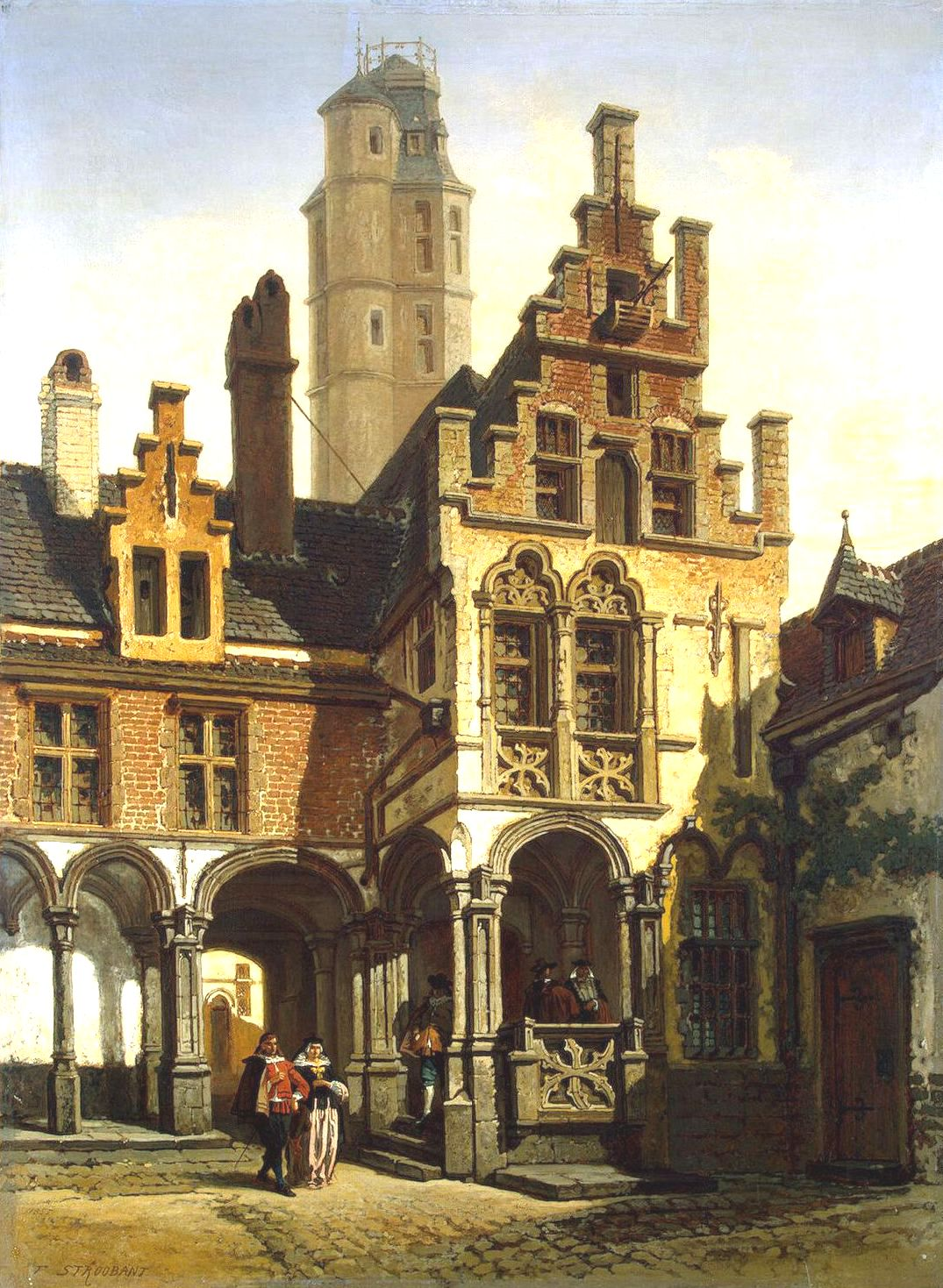
Courtyard of Marguerite of Austria at Mechelen
