= Hôtel Hannon =

Historic Art Nouveau house in Brussels, Belgium

- Hôtel Hannon (French); Hotel Hannon (Dutch)
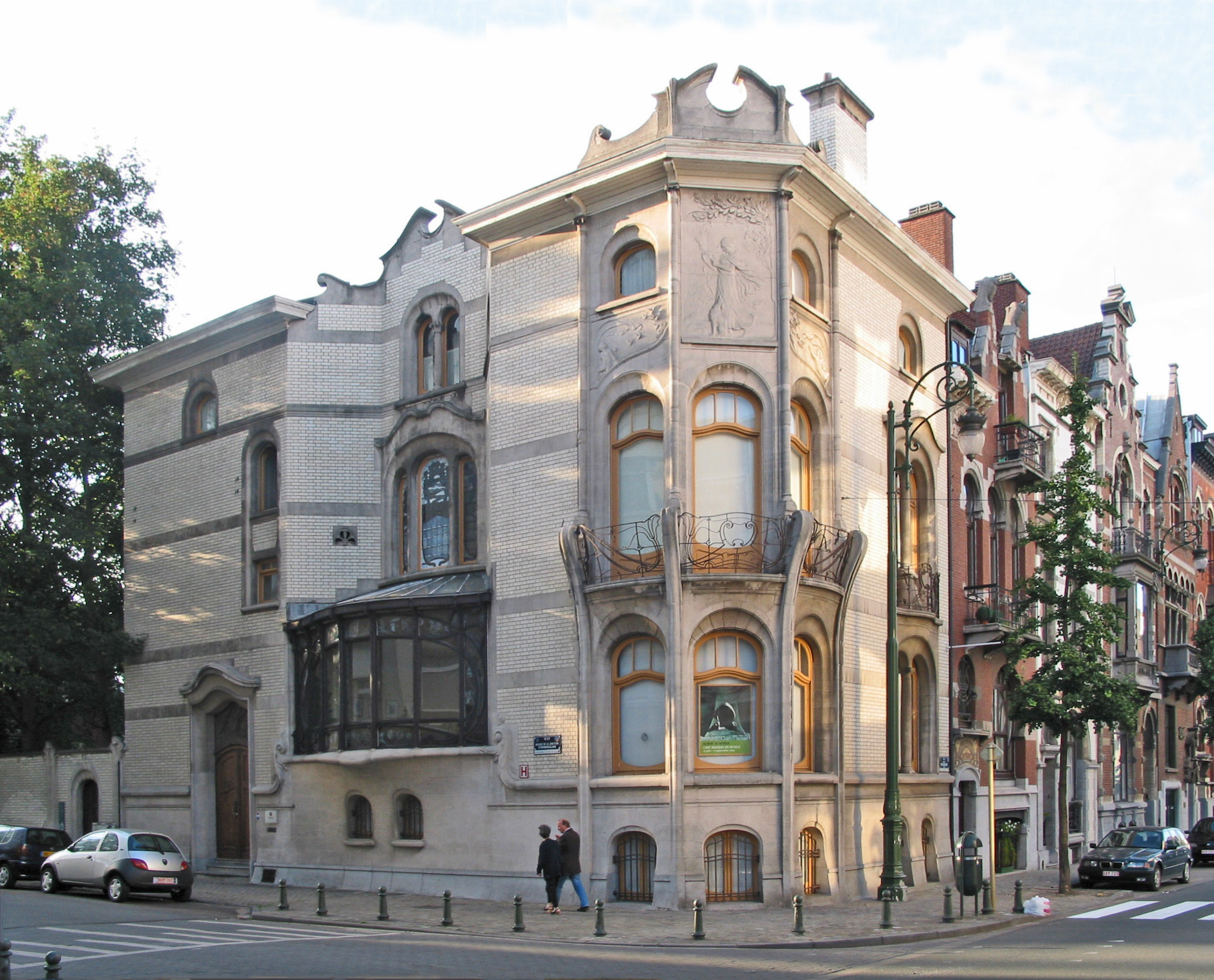
- Main façades of the Hôtel Hannon
- Alternative names: Hannon House

General information
- Type: Town house
- Architectural style: Art Nouveau
- Location: Avenue de la Jonction / Verbindingslaan 1, 1060 Saint-Gilles, Brussels-Capital Region, Belgium
- Coordinates: 50°49′15″N 4°21′08″E
- Construction started: 1902
- Completed: 1904

Design and construction
- Architect: Jules Brunfaut

Website
- www.maisonhannon.be/en

The Hôtel Hannon (French: Hôtel Hannon; Dutch: Hotel Hannon) or Hannon House (French: Maison Hannon; Dutch: Huis Hannon or Hannonhuis) is a historic town house in Brussels, Belgium. Constructed between 1902 and 1904, in Art Nouveau style, for the industrialist Édouard Hannon and his wife, Marie Debard, it is the only house in that style designed by the architect Jules Brunfaut.

The Hôtel Hannon is located at 1, avenue de la Jonction/Verbindingslaan, at the corner of the Avenue Brugmann/Brugmannlaan, in the municipality of Saint-Gilles, "in a neighbourhood which, even today, remains a sacred district of architectural jewels."

== History ==
Édouard Hannon was an engineer with Solvay S.A., a major chemicals company, and the long-time manager of Solvay's sodium carbonate plant at Dombasle-sur-Meurthe, just south of Nancy, France. He was also a painter, art critic and photographer.

The Hannons gave the task of conceiving and building their new house to Edouard's childhood friend, Jules Brunfaut, asking him to use the Art Nouveau style that they loved and that was popular both in Brussels and Nancy. The house was occupied by the Hannon family until 1965. Upon the death of the original owner's daughter, the property was abandoned, vandalised, and eventually threatened with demolition.

In 1973, Marie Van Mulders-Brunfaut, Jules Brunfaut's daughter, consulted the Royal Commission of Monuments and Sites to enquire about the status of the house, which was still unoccupied. As a result, the exterior was classified as a protected monument in 1976. The building was acquired by the municipality of Saint-Gilles in 1979, the interior was classified in 1983, and it underwent a significant renovation between 1984 and 1989.

In 1988, the Hôtel Hannon was put at the disposal of the Espace photographique Contretype, which, in addition to conserving the photographic work of Édouard Hannon, works to promote creative photography through exhibitions, retrospectives of artists, conferences and their publications. After having occupied the Hôtel until 2014, Contretype moved to the Cité Fontainas, another building in Saint-Gilles.

In 2023, the entirely renovated building became a museum, under the auspices of the team at the Horta Museum. Visitors are able to rediscover the furniture of Émile Gallé, which returned to its original home.

== Architecture ==
The façades of the Hôtel Hannon combine white brick, limestone, and blue stone. The house has two very asymmetrical façades: a short one of a single bay on the Avenue Brugmann, and a more important façade of two bays on the Avenue de la Jonction, with the two façades joined by a three-bay angular span between them. The façade of the Avenue de la Jonction presents a play of volumes in projections and recesses. Its central bay carries a large bay window comprising a limestone base, a chassis in wood that holds a stained glass window by Raphaël Évaldre and a roof covered in zinc, surmounted by a setback of the upper floors, pierced by a triplet of windows on the first floor and a pair of windows on the second floor.

The corner, consisting of three bays, is ornamented with a wrought iron balcony undergirded by a stone substructure that extends from the base to the first floor, where they "open into volutes." The upper level of the corner bay is decorated with a large bas-relief by Victor Rousseau entitled La fileuse ("The spinner"), which is an allegory of Time.

The building is a rather clumsy Art Nouveau design, and Brunfaut's discomfort with the style is evident, but the architect nonetheless took some cues from his fellow, more adept Art Nouveau designer Victor Horta, such as the impressive central staircase, a typical design element in Horta's residences such as the Hôtel Tassel, the Hôtel Solvay, and the Hôtel van Eetvelde.

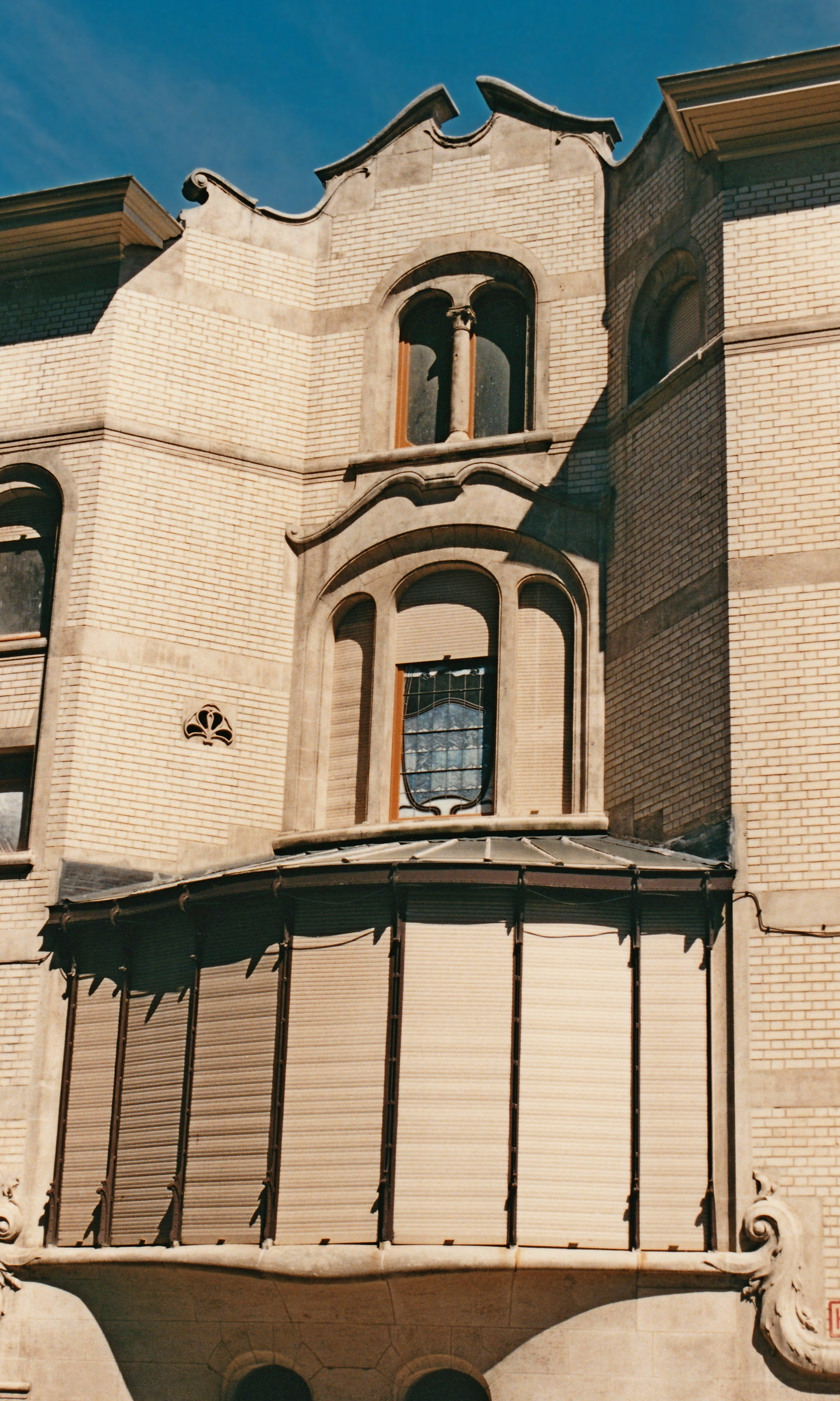
Oriel and bays facing the Avenue de la Jonction

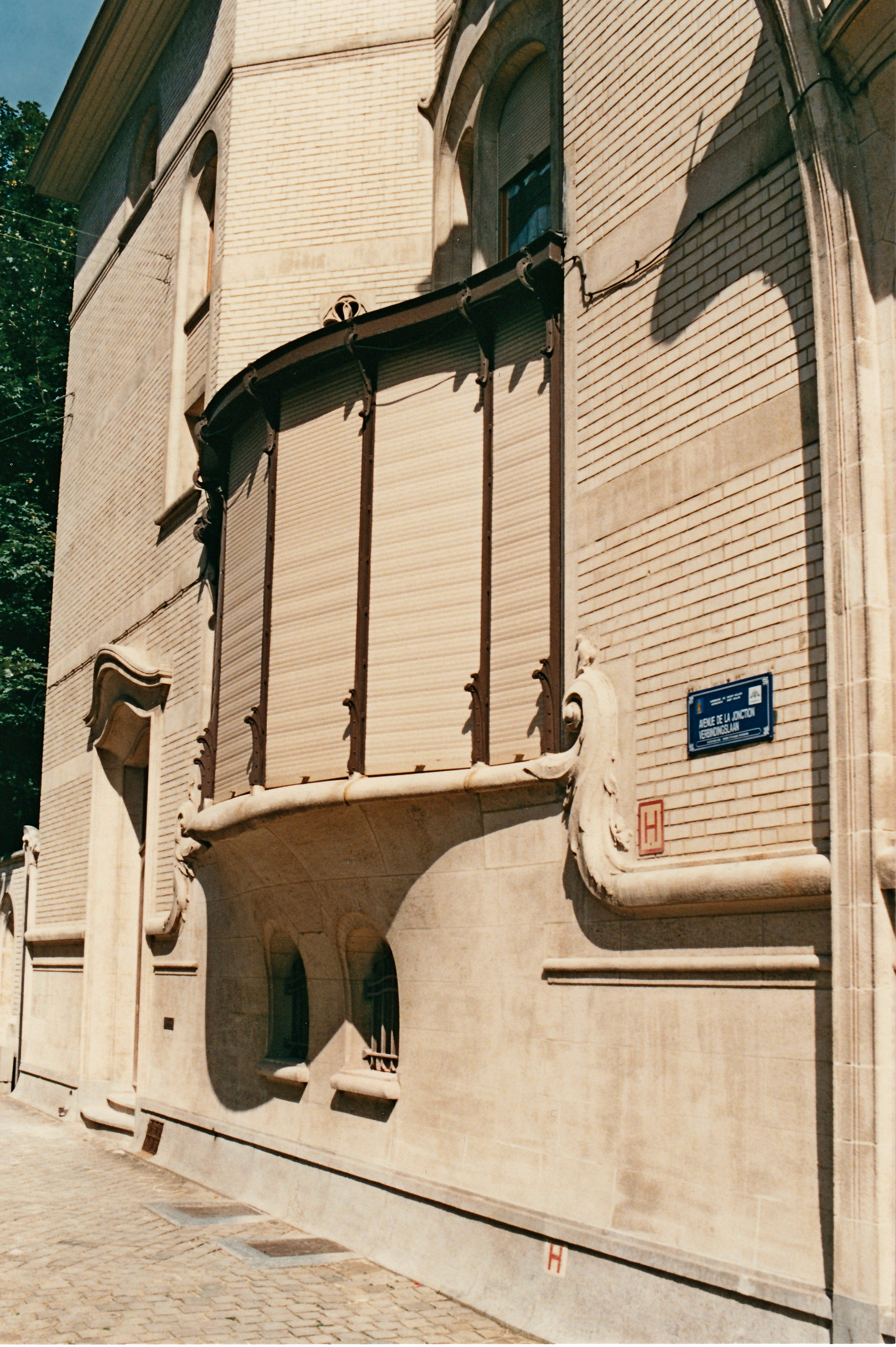
Oriel

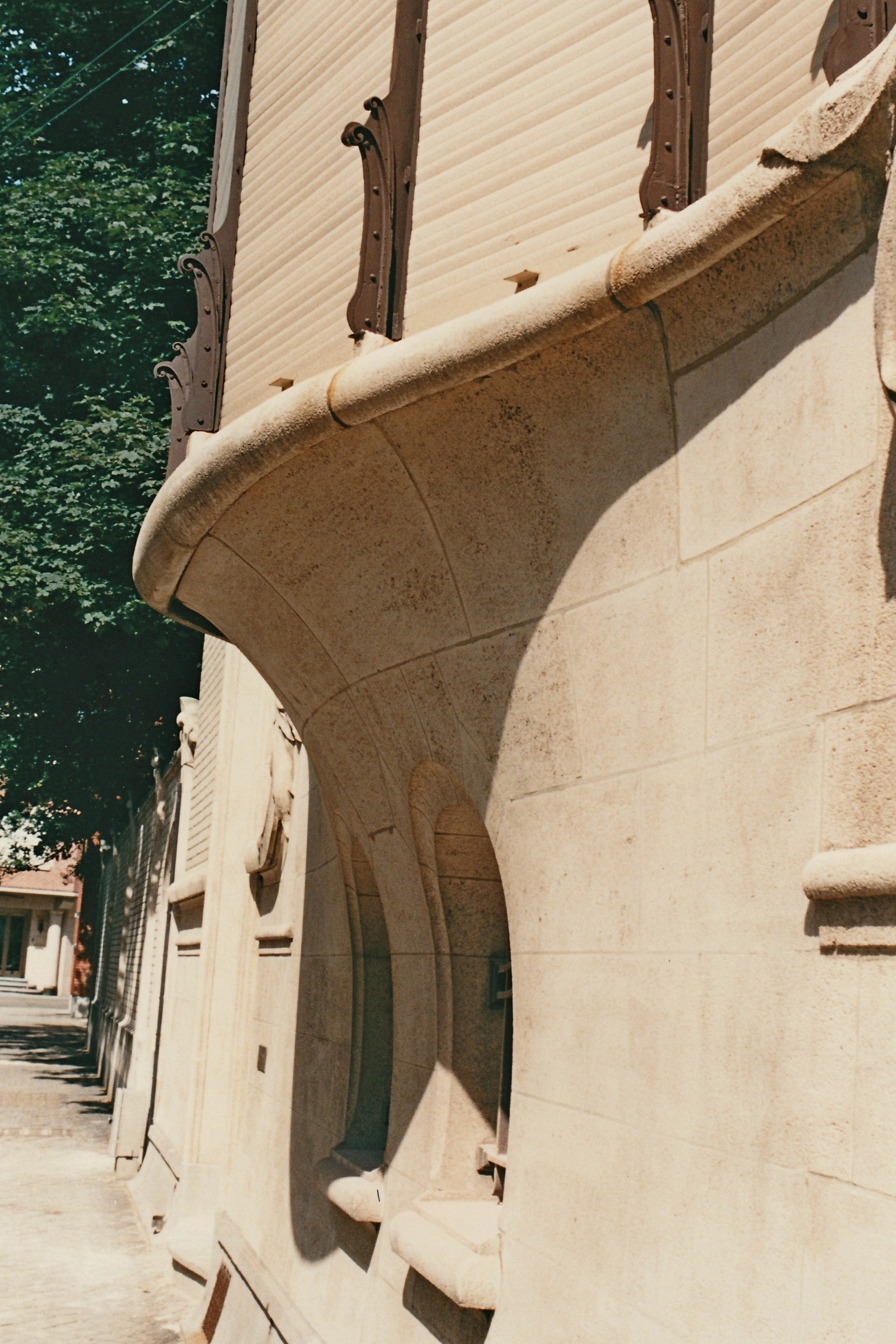
Base of the oriel

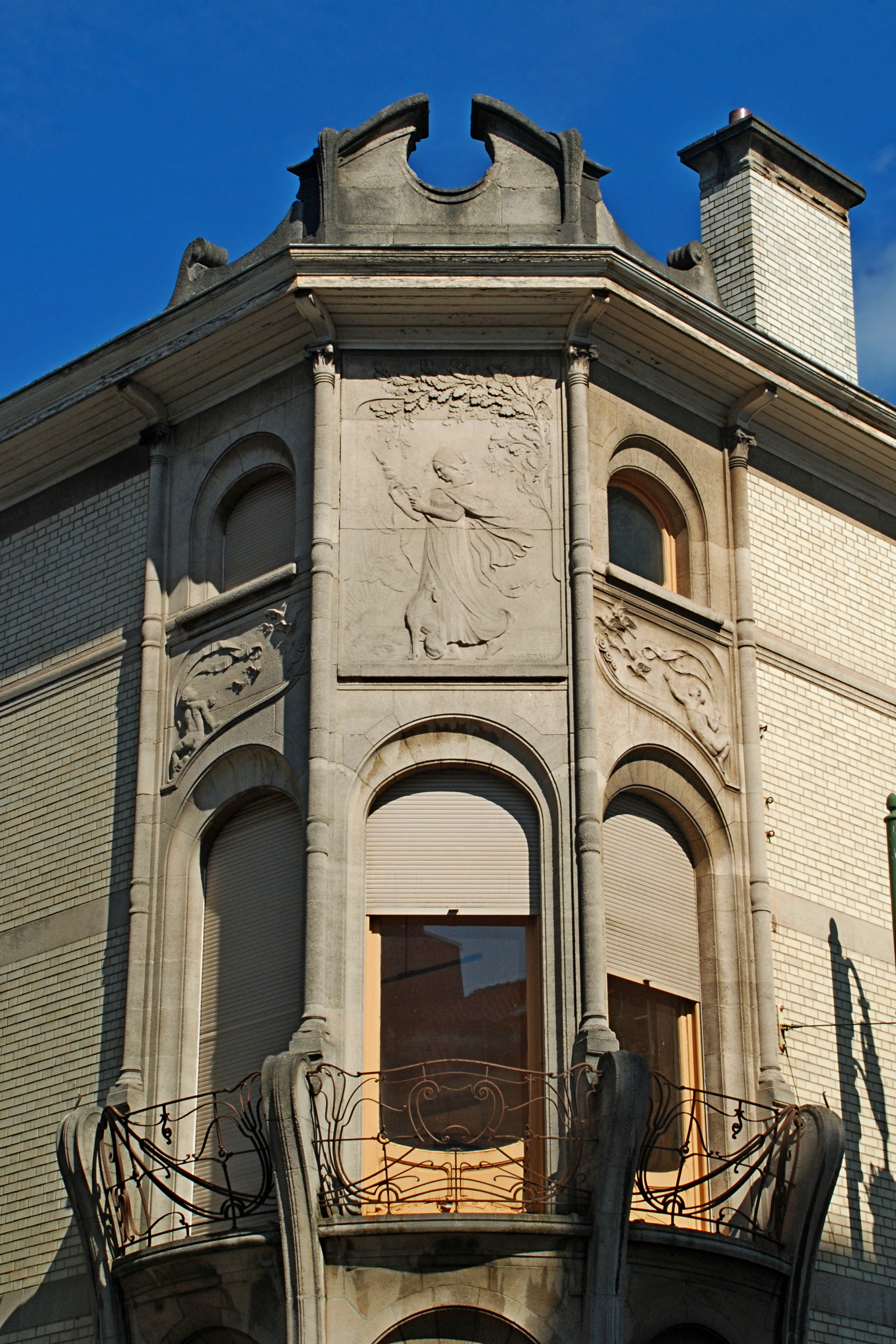
Corner bays

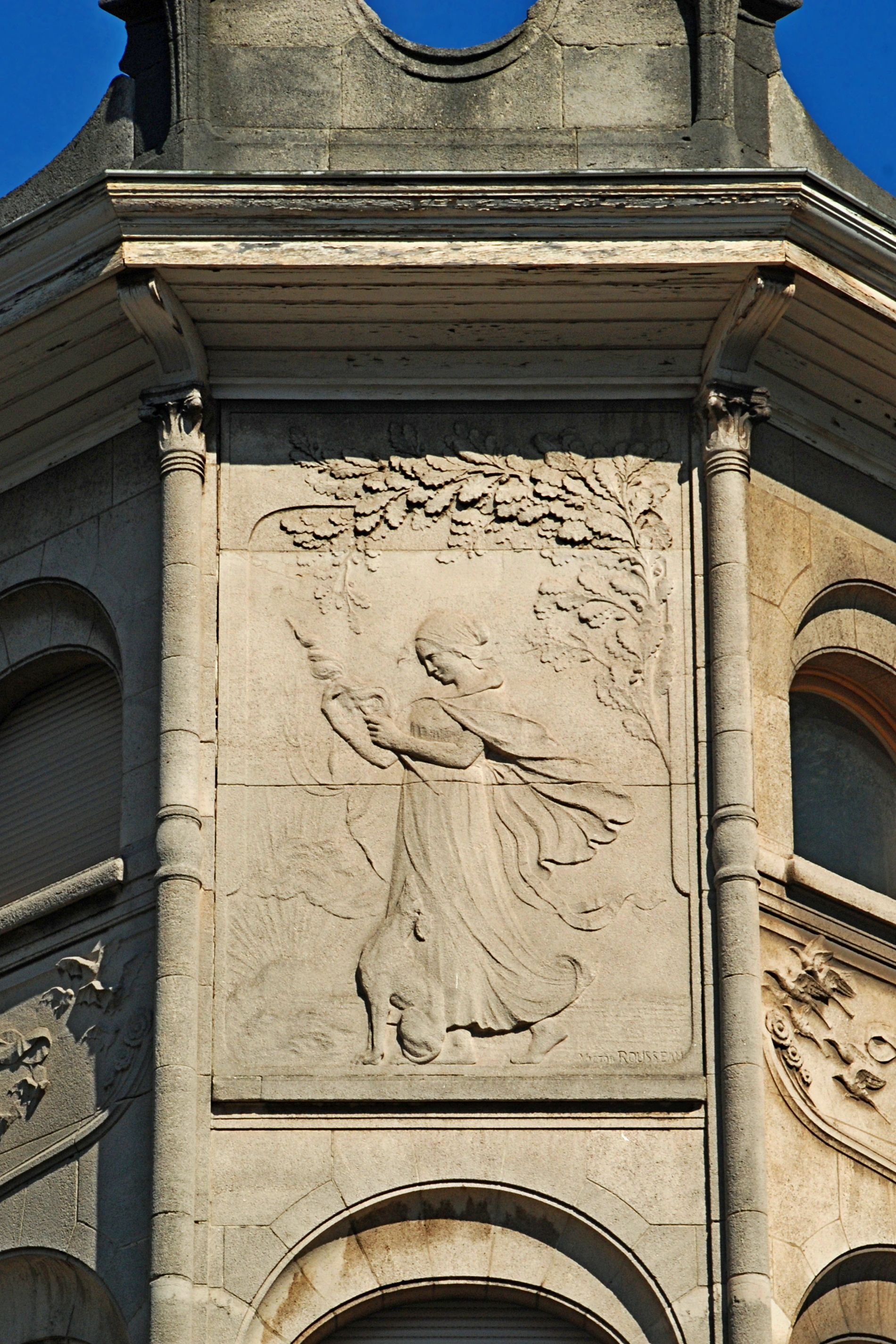
La fileuse, bas-relief by Victor Rousseau

== Interior ==
The architect called on numerous artists for the building's interior and exterior decoration. The conception of the furniture (some of which returned to the house in 2023 with the opening of the museum) and the interior decoration is the work of Émile Gallé and Louis Majorelle. Certain frescoes in the living room and the stair hall are the work of the painter Paul Albert Baudouin. The staircase ironwork is by Pierre Desmedt, and the stained glass the work of Raphaël Évaldre.

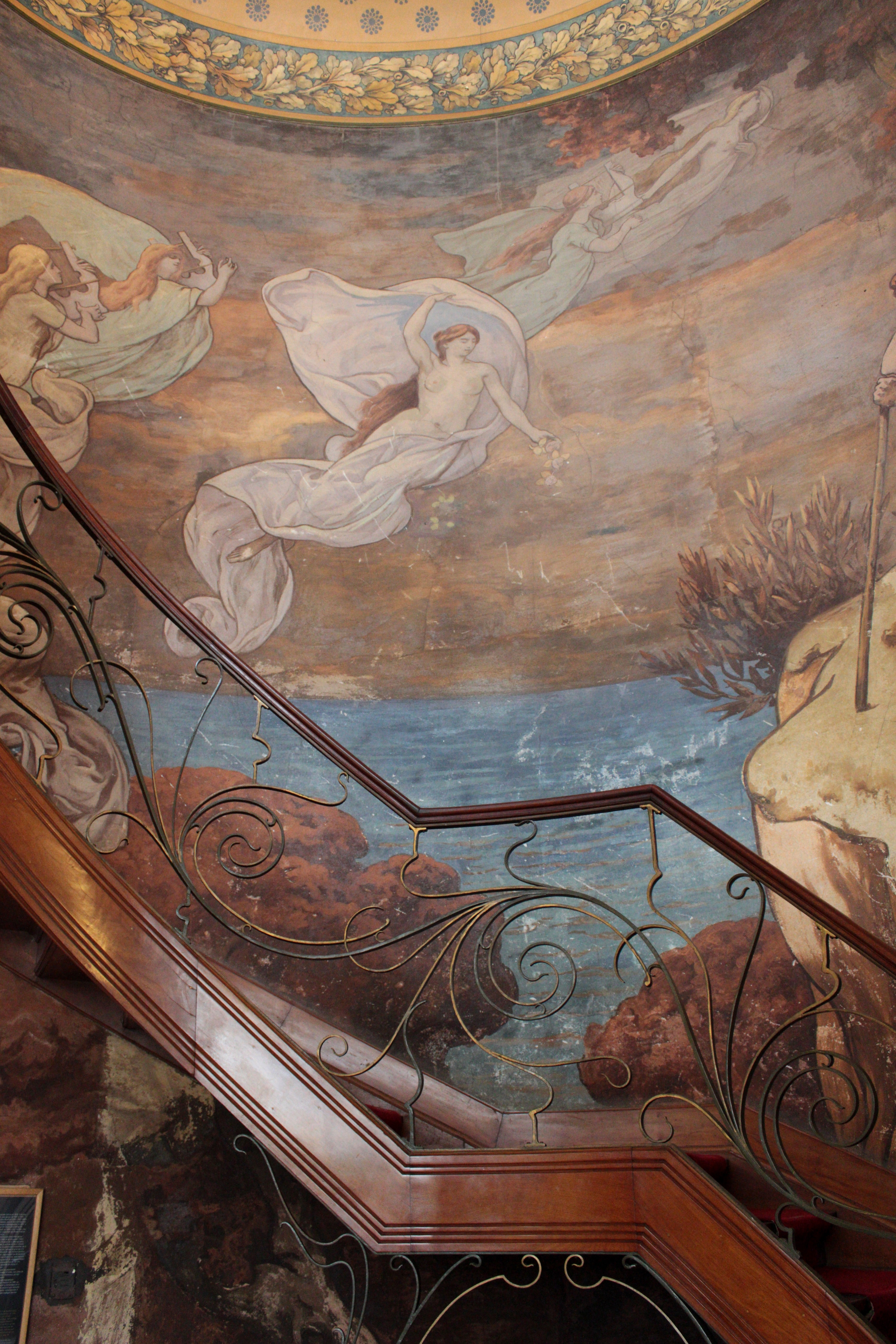
Stair hall fresco

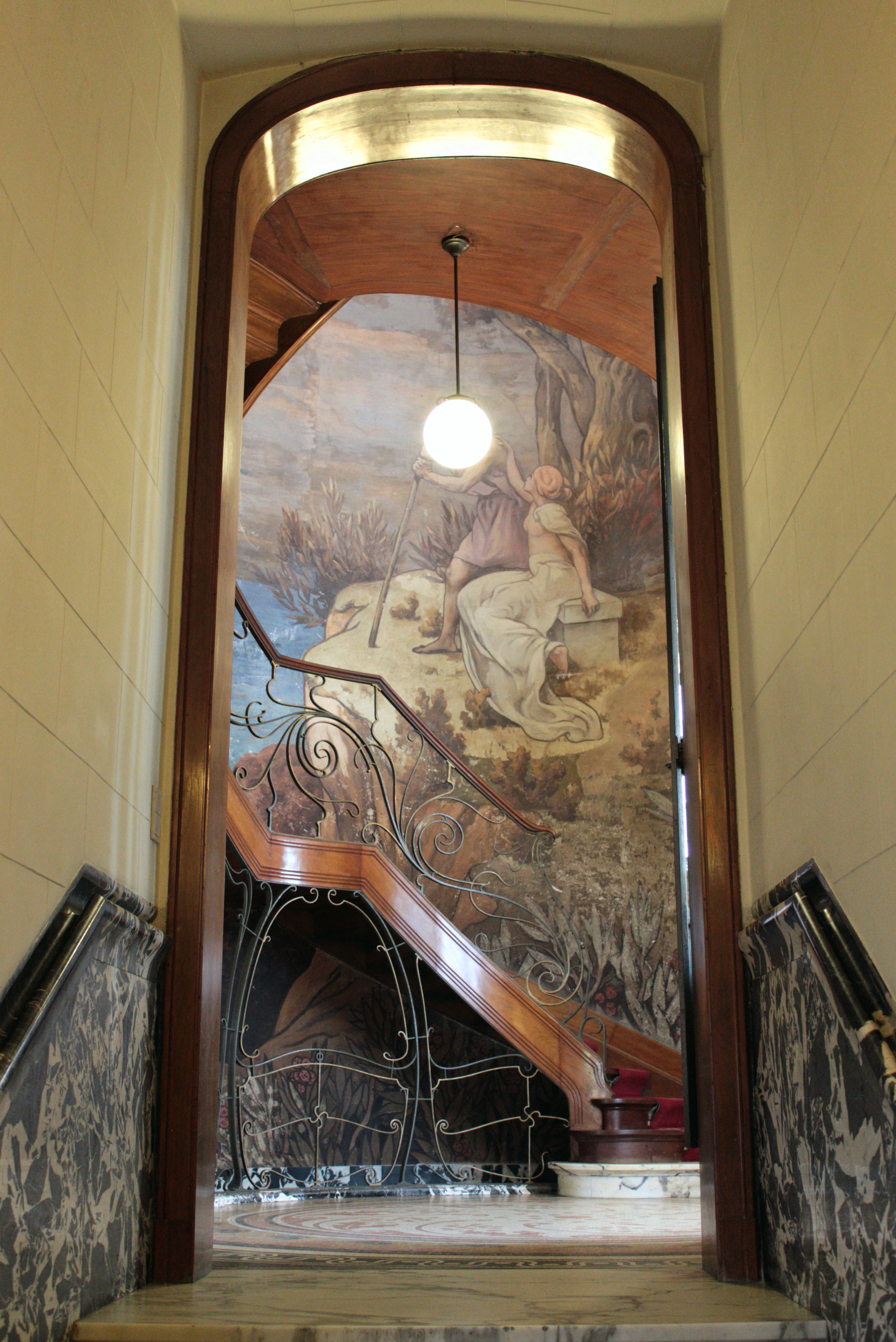
Stair hall fresco

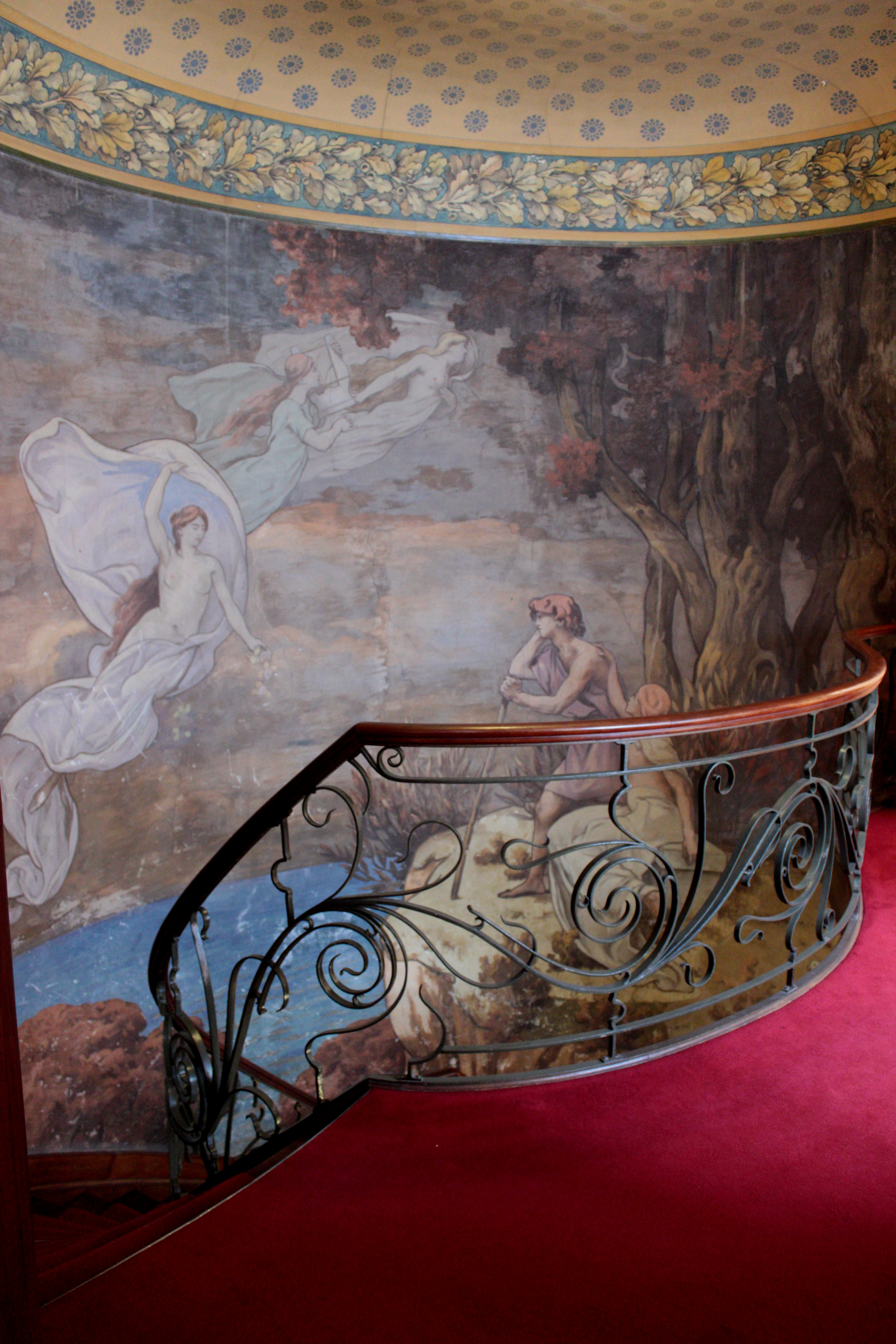
Stair hall fresco

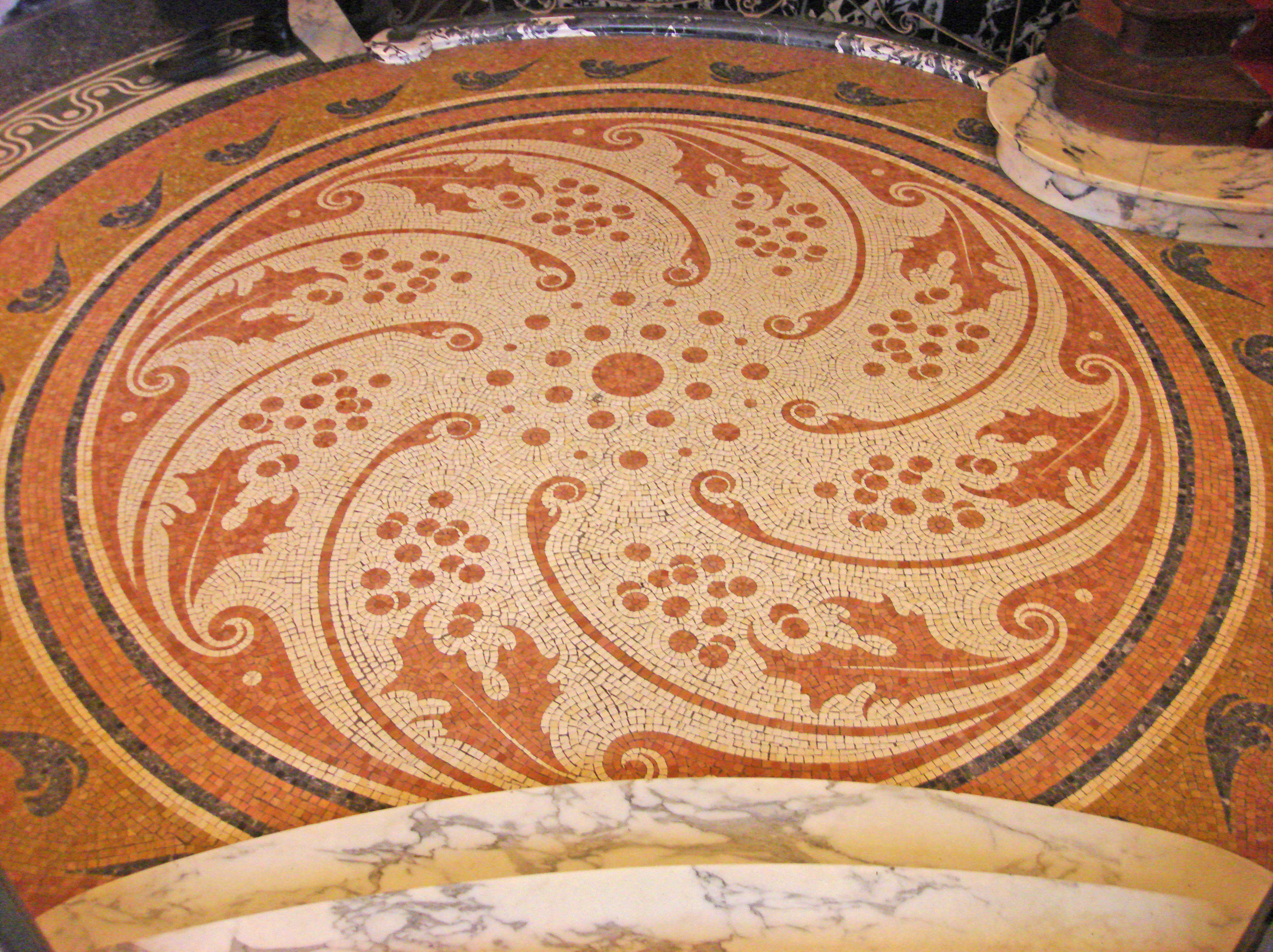
Stair hall mosaic

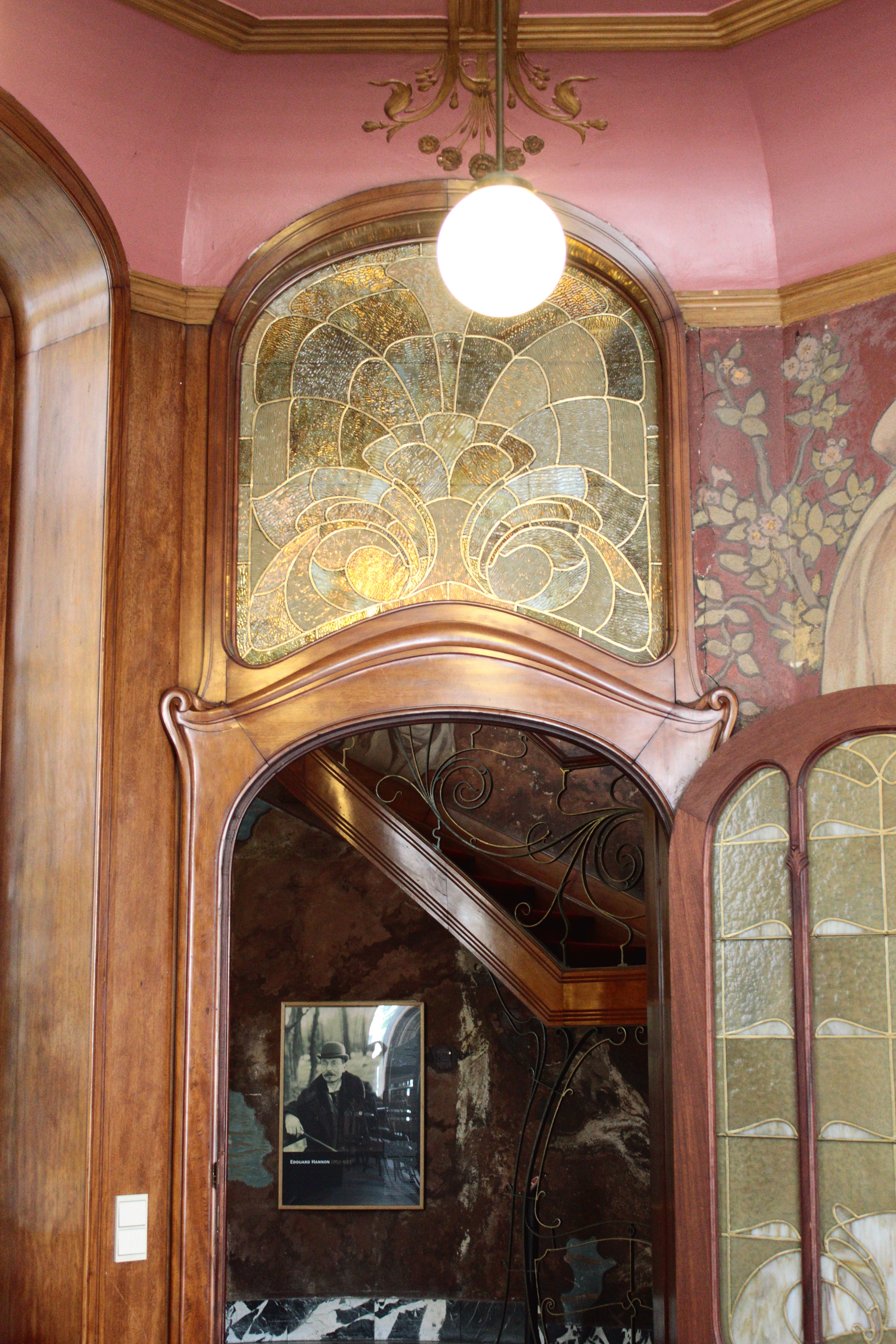
Stained glass

== See also ==
- List of museums in Brussels
- Art Nouveau in Brussels
- History of Brussels
- Culture of Belgium
- Belgium in the long nineteenth century
