= Amédée Lynen =

Belgian painter

Amédée Ernest Lynen
- Born: Amédée Ernest Lynen; 1852; Belgium
- Died: 1938 (aged 85–86)
- Occupations: Painter, illustrator and writer.

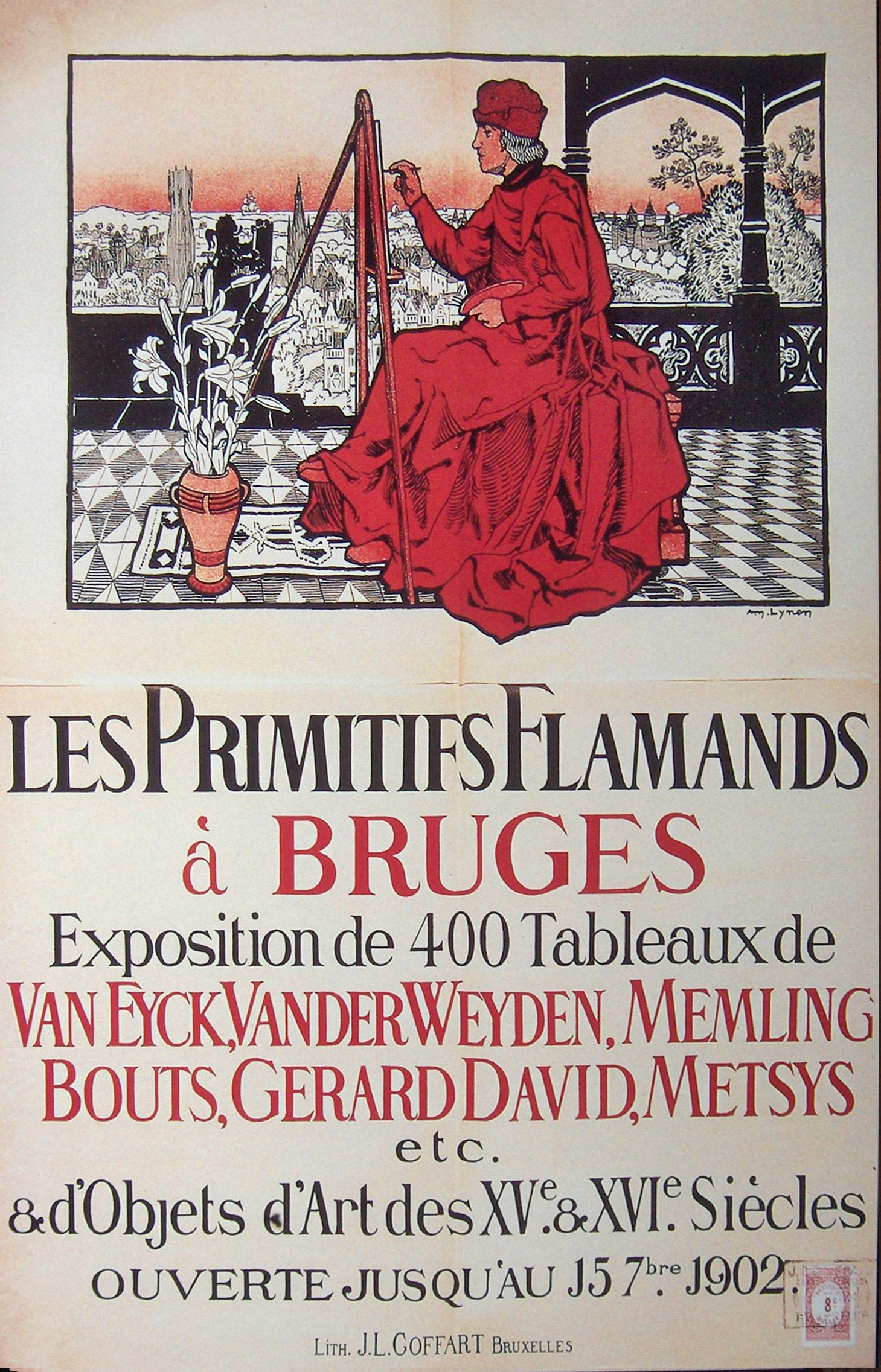
Official poster for the 1902 Exposition des primitifs flamands à Bruges

Amédée Ernest Lynen (1852–1938), who often signed his works Am. Lynen, was a Belgian painter, illustrator and writer. In 1880, he was one of the founders of the artistic group L'Essor after it had separated from the academy, and he co-founded its successor Pour l'Art in 1892. In 1895, he founded the "Compagnie du Diable-au-corps", an artistic association which organised evenings with theatre and poetry, and which existed at least until 1899. It also published a satirical newspaper, Le Diable au Corps. In 1903, two works on paper were bought by the Royal Museums of Fine Arts of Belgium. In 1930, a retrospective of his works was organised by the Cercle Artistique et Littéraire in the Vauxhall, Brussels.

== Works ==
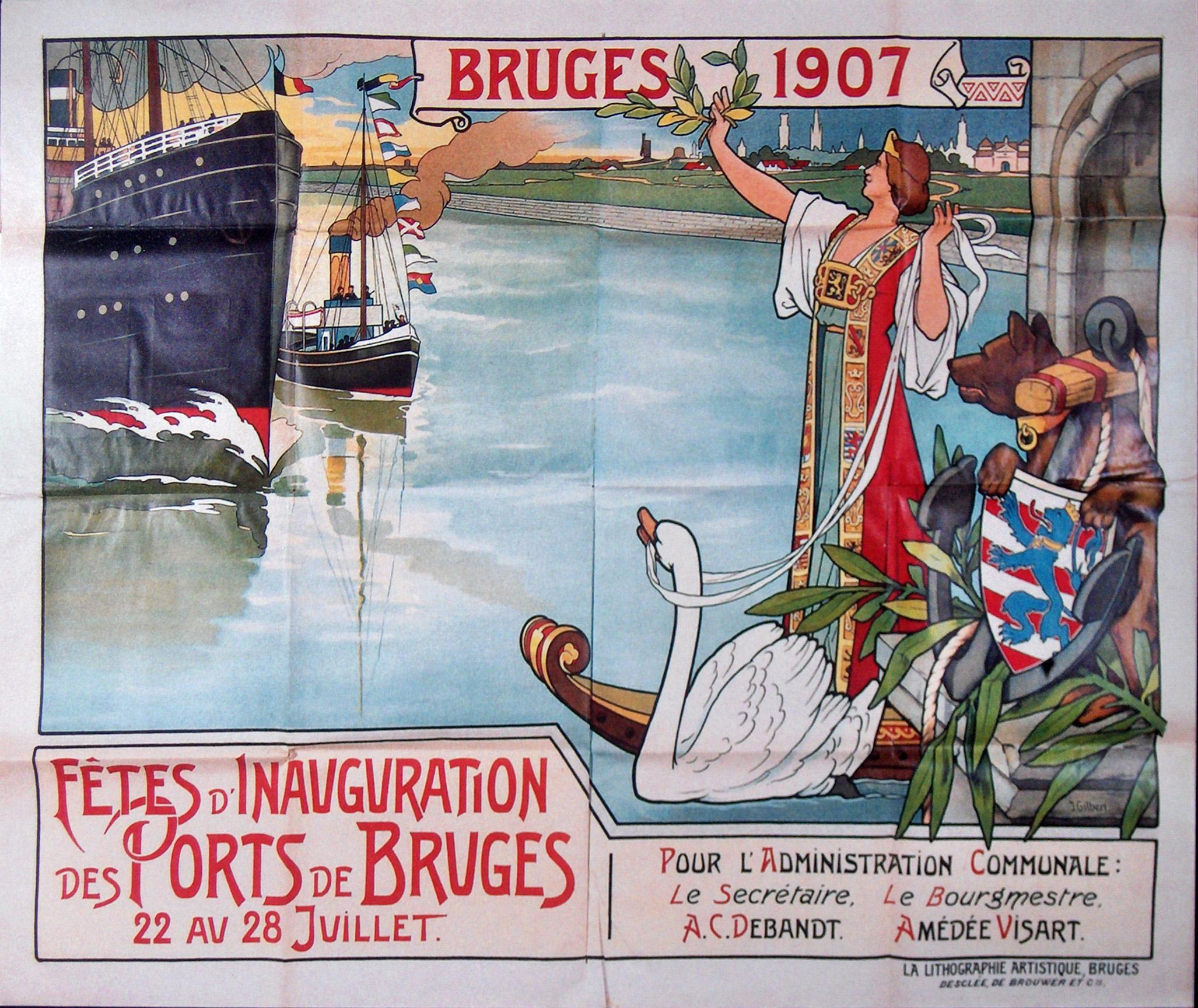
Poster for the inauguration of the Port of Bruges-Zeebrugge in 1907

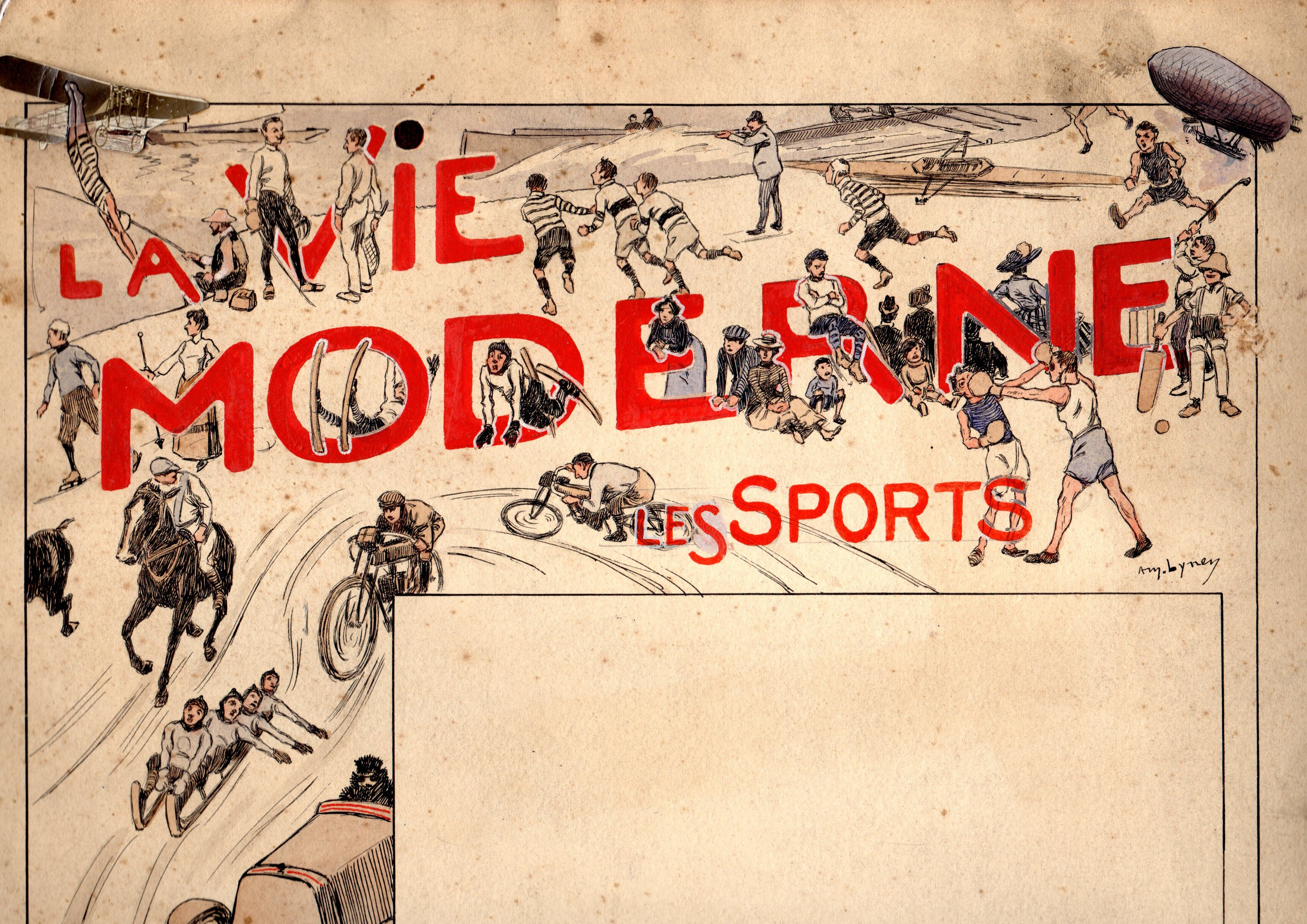
Design by Lynen for the heading of a magazine La vie moderne Les sports

- Wrote and illustrated Sébastien Vranckx, peintre de moeurs escarmouches et combats (1901, published by Lamertin)
- Wrote and illustrated Le jaquemart de la tour du pré-rouge (1902, published by Lamertin)
- Wrote and illustrated L'Oeuvre de Maîtrise (1918, Goossens), with a foreword by Georges Eekhoud
- The poster for the 1902 Exposition des primitifs flamands à Bruges
- Posters for exhibitions, performances and festivities

=== Illustrations for books ===
Among the many works with one or more illustrations by Lynen can be cited:

- Le Théâtrè a la Maison by Émile Leclercq
- La femme de Roland by Pierre Elzéar (1882, published by Kistemaeckers)
- First impression of À vau-l'eau by Joris-Karl Huysmans (1882, published by Kistemaeckers)
- Contes érotico-philosophiques by Antoine Aimé Beaufort d'Auberval (1882, published by Kistemaeckers)
- Au pays de Manneken-Pis by Theodore Hannon (1883, published by Kistemaeckers)
- Le cheveu, conte moral by Simon Coiffier de Moret (1883, published by Kistemaeckers)
- Noëls fin-de-siècle by Theodore Hannon (1892)
- Guide de la section de l'état indépendant du Congo à l'exposition de Bruxelles-Tervueren en 1897
- Les vertus bourgeoises by Henri Carton de Wiart (1912, Van Oest)
- More than 250 illustrations for The Legend of Thyl Ulenspiegel and Lamme Goedzak by Charles De Coster (1914, published by Lamertin)
- L'Enseignement Professionnel En Belgique, 1921
