= Harold Thomas =

Harold Thomas may refer to:

- Harold Thomas (artist) (born 1947), Indigenous Australian artist and activist, designer of the Aboriginal Australian flag
- Harold Thomas (rugby, born 1914) (1914–1989), Welsh dual-code international rugby union and rugby league footballer
- Harold Thomas (rugby union, born 1883) (1883–1947), Welsh rugby forward
- Harold Chester Thomas (1907–1942), U.S. Navy officer
- Harold Thomas (boxer) (1909–1933), New Zealand Olympic boxer
- Harold Wolferstan Thomas (1875–1931), Canadian doctor
- USS Harold C. Thomas, an Evarts-class destroyer escort

== See also ==
- Harry Thomas (disambiguation)
