= Henri Joseph Thomas =

Belgian painter, sculptor and etcher

- Born: Henri Joseph Thomas; 18 or 22 June 1878; Molenbeek-Saint-Jean, Belgium
- Died: 22 November 1972 (aged 94); Brussels, Belgium
- Education: Académie Royale des Beaux-Arts, Brussels
- Known for: Portrait, still life painting and etching
- Notable work: Vénus, Danseuse de cabaret, Fleurs, Illustrations in 'Au claire de la dune (1909) and La toison de Phryné (1913) by Théodore Hannon
- Movement: Belgian School

Henri Joseph Thomas (1878-1972) was a Belgian genre, portrait and still life painter, sculptor and etcher from the Belgian School, Brussels, Belgium.

== Biography ==
Henri Joseph Thomas was born in Molenbeek-Saint-Jean in June 1878. He studied at the Académie Royale des Beaux-Arts in Brussels from 1895 until 1898 and started a studio in Brussels afterwards, where he mainly worked as an illustrator of avant-garde books. He also specialized in marine paintings, floral still life paintings and portraits of elegant ladies. He eventually started his career with the presentation of a Vénus de bar at the Godecharle contest in 1909. His expositions in the Belle Époque include those at the Cercle Artistique et Littéraire in Brussels in 1906, 1909 and 1921, and in the Société Nationale des Beaux-Arts in Paris in 1906, 1907, 1908 and 1910. Thomas was a member of the Labeur society for fine artists that organised annual expositions for its members in the Museum of Modern Arts (Musée Moderne) in Brussels between 1898 and 1907. His painting The Star (l'Etoile) was exposed in the Museum of Ixelles and at the Triennale of Liege in Belgium, 1928.

He often depicted night life scenes in bars and portraits of ladies, with suggestions of decadence, temptation, adultery and prostitution in the poses of his women. His paintings and etchings of elegant women date mainly from the Belle Époque and interbellum. In his painting of luscious women he was a follower of the Belgian painter and etcher Félicien Rops.

Henri Thomas illustrated several books with his drawings and etchings. This already started just after he ended his training when in 1898 he contributed 40 illustrations to the gay-erotic book L'Homme-sirène by Louis Didier who worked under the pseudonym Luis d'Herdy. In 1909 La muse (the muse) was published in a Au claire de la dune, a collection of poems by the Belgian poet Théo Hannon. He later illustrated a collection of erotic poems, La toison de Phryné published in 1913 by Théodore Hannon, with 11 engravings, of which two were in colour. He also illustrated Du coeur aux lèvres by Lucien Solvay and Les Diaboliques (the She-devils) by Jules Barbey d'Aurevilly Some of his engravings also appeared in the fourth (1926-1927) and eight (Volupté, 1935) series of La Gravure Originale Belge (Original Belgian Engravings). This series consisted of 11 paper portfolios of about ten original engravings signed by the artist that were published for subscribers in limited editions by the Comité de La Gravure Originale Belge between 1924 and 1939.

Henri Thomas lived in Brussels at Rue Hydraulique 44 around 1907 and moved to Rue du Berceau 28, where he lived during the interbellum. He died in Brussels on 22 November 1972.

== Expositions ==
- 1905, Paris: Salon de la Société Nationale des Beaux-Arts (Vénus)
- 1906, Brussels: Cercle Artistique et Littéraire
- 1906, Paris: Salon de la Société Nationale des Beaux-Arts (L'habituée)
- 1907, Paris: Salon de la Société Nationale des Beaux-Arts (L'oiseau du paradis, Coin de music-hall, Le rideau de zéphir).
- 1908, Paris: Salon de la Société Nationale des Beaux-Arts (Symphonie et comparaison (villageoise et citadine))
- 1909, Brussels: Cercle Artistique et Littéraire
- 1910, Brussels: Cercle Artistique et Littéraire
- 1910, Paris: Societé Nationale des Beaux-Arts (La dame aux gants noirs)
- 1912, Venice: 10th Venice Biennale.
- 1921, Brussels: Cercle Artistique et Littéraire (Coquetterie). Exhibition with Alexandre Marcette and Victor Creten.
- 1926, Brussels: 10th Exposition of La Gravure Originale Belge, La Maison de Livre.
- 1928, Liege: Triennale.
- 1988, Brussels: Art Déco Belgique 1920-1940, Museum of Ixelles (Les désemparés, L'étoile).

== Artwork ==
- Portrait of grandfather of H.J. Thomas, 1901. Oil on canvas, 54 x 42 cm, signed with dedication.
- L'habituée, 1904. Exposed at the Salon of the Société Nationale des Beaux-Arts in Paris, 1906.
- Vénus. Barcelona.
- Elégante au robe noir, 1904-1905. Oil on canvas, 120 x 100 cm.
- Coin de music-hall. Exposed at the Salon of the Société Nationale des Beaux-Arts in 1907.
- Symphonie et comparaison (villageoise et citadine). Exposed at the Salon of the Société Nationale des Beaux-Arts in 1908.
- La coucheuse, 1910. Oil on canvas, 40 x 32 cm.
- La table réservé, 1911. Oil on canvas, 201 x 151 cm, signed. Groeningemuseum (in storage), Bruges, Belgium
- Danseuse de cabaret. Musée des Beaux-Arts de Liège, Belgium. Published as museum gift shop postcard.
- Danseuse de corde, before 1913. Oil on canvas, 101 x 76.5 cm, signed. Musée national d'Art moderne - Centre Georges Pompidou, Paris.
- La résistance, 1914. Etching, 64 x 44.5 cm, numbered and signed, 150 prints. Private collection M.J. Waterloo, Amsterdam, The Netherlands.
- L'amour éternel, no date. Oil on canvas, 45 x 33 cm, signed.
- Fleurs (Flowers), no date. Oil on canvas, signed. Private collection.
- Pink flowers in glass vase, no date. Oil on panel, 36 x 27 cm, signed lower right. Private collection.
- L'étoile, no date. Oil on canvas, 174 x 124 cm. Private collection Brussels. Exposed at the Museum of Ixelles.
- Le boudoir, no date. Etching, 38 x 30.5 cm. Signed lower right.
- Danseuse de bar, 1917. Oil on canvas, 75 x 44.5 cm, signed.
- La petite Suzanne, no date. Oil on canvas, 75 x 93 cm, signed.
- Sur le divan, 1917. Oil on canvas, 50 x 60 cm, signed.
- Vase de jonquilles, no date. Oil on wood panel, 25 x 30 cm, signed.
- Vase fleuri de dahlias, no date. Oil on canvas, 58 x 47,5 cm, signed.
- Coquetterie, 1919. Oil on wood panel, 51 x 38 cm, signed.
- Extase, no date. Oil on wood panel, 15 x 20 cm, signed.
- Cariatide, no date. Etching (100 printed), 45 x 33 cm, signed in pencil.
- Nu assis, no date. Wash, 58 x 41 cm, signed lower right.
- La Mélancolie, no date. Monotype on paper, 49 x 34.5 cm, signed in red pencil. Private collection Amsterdam.
- La robe blanche, no date, study. Oil on panel, 35.5 x 27.5 cm.
- Femme fatale, no date. Oil on wood panel, 45 x 35.5 cm, signed.
- Femme couche au voile, no date. Oil on plywood, 49.5 x 70 cm, signed.
- Femme nue allongée, no date. Oil on canvas, 60 x 73 cm, signed.
- Nue féminin dans un intérieur, no date. Oil on canvas, 100 x 74 cm, signed.
- Deux femmes agenouillées tenant une statuette, no date. Oil on canvas, 60 x 73 cm, signed.
- Mon jardin, rue du Berceau 28 - Brussels, no date. Oil on canvas, 101 x 65,5 cm, signed on back.
- L’allée du jardin de l’artiste ensoleillé, rue du Berceau 28 - Brussels, no date. Oil on canvas, 120 x 92 cm, signed.
- Nature morte aux fleurs et aux fruits, no date. Oil on canvas, 73 x 60 cm, signed.
- La Dame au collier, no date. Soft-ground etching on paper, 33 x 56 cm, signed and titled. Private collection M.J. Waterloo, Amsterdam, The Netherlands..
- Jeune fille se mirant, no date. Pastel on paper, 60 x 65 cm oval, signed.
- Les glaïeuls rouges, no date. Oil on canvas, 106 x 79 cm, signed and titled.
- Femme au tub, no date. Etching, 33 x 24 cm, signed and titled on lower margin.
- Les soupeurs, no date. Etching 100 ex., 63 x 48 cm, titled, signed in lower margin.
- Fraises et muguets, no date. Oil on wood panel, 46,5 x 38 cm, signed.
- La jacinthe et le cactus, no date. Oil on canvas, 60 x 40 cm, signed.
- Le sourire énigmatique, no date. Oil on wood panel, 40 x 30 cm, signed.
- Le petit modèle, no date. Oil on canvas, 89 x 69 cm, signed and dedicated (label on back).
- Les désemparés, no date. Oil on canvas, 138 x 106 cm, signed. R. Clicteur-Dobellaere collection, Maldegem.
- Henri Joseph Thomas, 1948. Autoportrait. Oil on panel, 57 x 46 cm.
- Portrait de prostituée, 1952. Oil on canvas, 44.5 x 38.5 cm.
- Prostituée enceinte, no date. Oil on board, 29.5 x 23 cm, signed.
