= Harry Thomas =

Harry Thomas may refer to:

== Sports ==
- Harry Thomas (rugby league), New Zealand rugby league footballer of the 1920s
- Harry Thomas (rugby union), Welsh rugby union player
- Harry Thomas (footballer) (1901–?), Welsh football striker
- Henry Thomas (boxer) (1888–1963), British bantamweight boxer

== Politicians ==
- Harry Thomas Jr. (born 1960), politician in Washington, D.C.
- Harry Thomas Sr. (1922–1999), politician in Washington, D.C.
- Harry K. Thomas Jr. (born 1956), American diplomat

== Others ==
- Harry Thomas (1909–1996) Hollywood make-up man who worked on films directed by Ed Wood, Roger Corman and many others
- Harry Thomas (bishop) (1897–1955), Bishop of Taunton

== See also ==
- Harold Thomas (disambiguation)
- Henry Thomas (disambiguation)
