= Édouard Hannon =

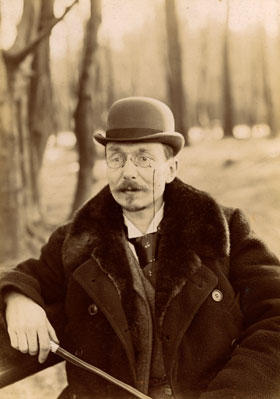
- Born: 1853; Ixelles, Belgium
- Died: 1931 (aged 77–78); Saint-Gilles, Belgium
- Occupation(s): Engineer, photographer
- Father: Joseph-Désiré Hannon
- Family: Mariette Hannon Rousseau; Theodore Hannon

Édouard Hannon (1853–1931) was a Belgian engineer and photographer. He was the son of the doctor and botanist Joseph-Désiré Hannon and the brother of the poet Théodore Hannon and the mycologist Mariette Rousseau (1850–1926).

== Biography ==
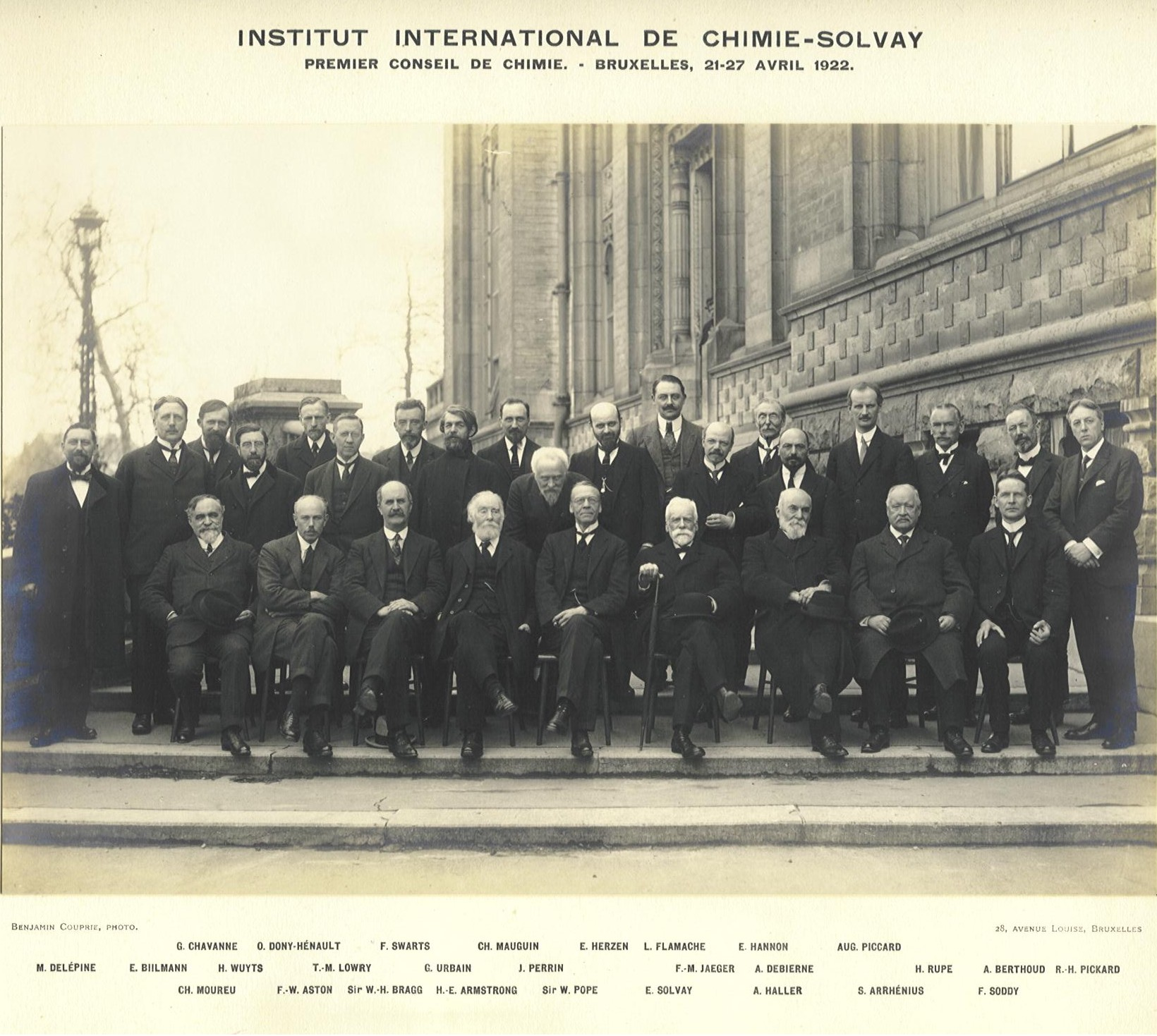
Photo of the first Solvay Conference of Chemistry (1922) with Édouard Hannon standing in the back row, sixth from the right.

He was the youngest son of Joseph-Désiré Hannon (1822–1870), doctor of natural sciences and medicine, and professor at the Université libre de Bruxelles (ULB). Upon his death on 23 August 1870, Ernest Rousseau (1831–1908), professor of physics at the ULB, became Edouard and his brothers' tutor. The future mycologist Marie-Sophie, dite Mariette (1850–1926) became and spouse of Ernest Rousseau, brother of Théodore, called Théo (1851–1916), the future painter and poet.

Édouard became a civil engineer, graduating from the École polytechnique in Ghent in 1875, then joining the Solvay Company in 1876, where he became technical director (1883), and then one of its managers (1907–1922). He was the longtime head of Solvay's soda plant in Dombasle-sur-Meurthe, France, just south of Nancy, where he became attracted to the works of the Art Nouveau artists Emile Gallé and Louis Majorelle. In April 1922, with his colleagues Édouard Herzen and Léon Flamache, he organized the first Solvay Conference of chemistry.

During the course of his working life, Édouard Hannon took many photographs which bear witness to the urban life of the socioeconomically disadvantaged classes of society in Spain, Italy, the United States and especially Czarist Russia at the end of the nineteenth century.

As an amateur photographer and through his portraits and landscapes, Édouard Hannon became a pioneer of pictorialism in Belgium. In 1874, he was one of the founding members of the Association belge de photographie. En 1894, he won the gold medal at the first exhibition of the Photo-club de Paris with his Matinée d'Automne ["Autumn Morning"] and participated in international photography shows in Berlin (1896) and Brussels (1902).

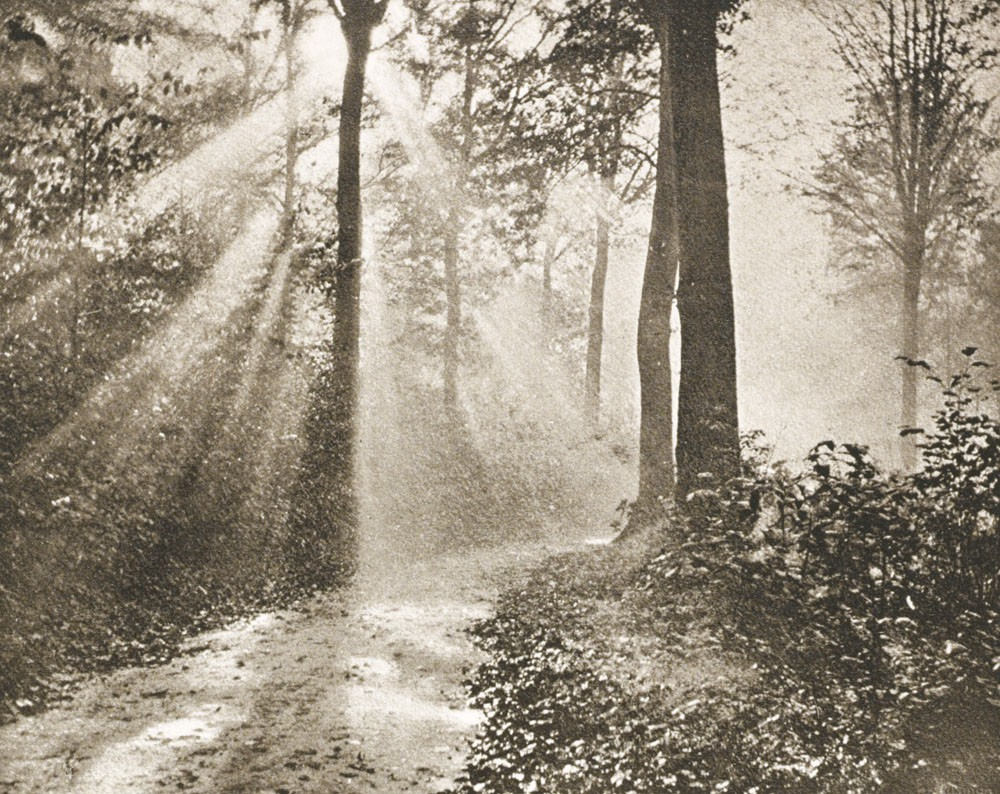
Matinée d'Automne (Édouard Hannon, 1894).

Two prints of Matinée d'Automne (1894) are in the collection of the Musée d'Orsay.

His name is perpetually associated with the Hôtel Hannon, an example of Art Nouveau architecture where he lived from 1904 onwards, and which housed, from 1988 to 2014, his collection of photographs as part of the Espace photographique Contretype.

He died in Saint-Gilles (Bruxelles) in 1931.
