= Henry T. Schnittkind =

American author and translator

Henry Thomas Schnittkind (pseudonym Henry Thomas; 18 August 1888 Russia – 25 December 1970 Bridgeport, Connecticut) was an American author and translator.

== Career ==
Schnittkind was born in Meretz, Russian Empire (now Vilnius, Lithuania) in 1888. He immigrated to New York just prior to his 10th birthday. Schnittkind earned three degrees from Harvard: a Bachelor of Arts in 1909, a Master of Arts in 1910, and a PhD in 1913. He was an organizer in 1915 of the Boston-based Stratford Publishing Company, and served as President from inception until 1930. Schnittkind also was an editor of The Stratford Journal. The Stratford Publishing Company merged with the American Bookbinding Company and was renamed American Book-Stratford Press, Inc., based in New York City, headed by Louis Satenstein (1874–1947).

== Selected bibliography ==
- Alice and the Stork (1915)
- Representative American poetry (1916)
- Stories of the steppe Maksim Gorky (translator) (1918)
- Nine humorous tales by Anton Pavlovich Chekhov (1918) (translator)
- The Story of Eugene Debs (1929)
- The story of the human race; a biographical outline of history (1935)
- Living biographies of great painters (1940)
- Living biographies of famous rulers (1940)
- Living biographies of great composers (1940)
- Living biographies of great philosophers (1941)
- Living biographies of great scientists (1941)
- Living biographies of great poets (1941)
- Living biographies of famous women (1942)
- Living biographies of American statesmen (1942)
- Living biographies of religious leaders (1942)
- Living biographies of famous novelists (1943)
- Living biographies of famous men (1944)
- Living biographies of famous Americans (1946)
- 50 great Americans : their inspiring lives and achievements (1948)
- Better English Made Easy (The Henry Thomas Method), Greystone Press (1954); OCLC 1654249
- 50 great modern lives; inspiring biographies of men and women who have guided mankind to a better world (1956)
- Copernicus (1960)
- Understanding the great philosophers (1962)
- Biographical encyclopedia of philosophy (1965)

== Pseudonyms ==
- Henry Thomas
- Dana Lee Thomas is thought to be a pseudonym of Henry Thomas Schnittkind. However, he and his wife, Sarah E. Wainchel (maiden; born around 1893) – whom he married February 22, 1915, in Lynn, Massachusetts – had a son named Dana Lee Thomas.
