= Henry Thomas (bibliographer) =

English bibliographer and Hispanic scholar

Sir Henry Thomas, FBA (21 November 1878 – 21 July 1952) was an English bibliographer and Hispanic scholar. A graduate of the University of Birmingham, he worked at the British Museum from 1903 to 1947, where he was successively Deputy Keeper (1924–43), Keeper (1943–45) and Principal Keeper (1946–47) of Printed Books. He delivered the Norman MacColl lectures at the University of Cambridge (1917) and the Taylorian Lecture at the University of Oxford (1922), was president of the Anglo-Spanish Society (1931 to 1947) and the Bibliographical Society (1936 to 1938), was elected a fellow of the British Academy in 1936, and knighted in 1946; he received DLitt degrees from the University of Birmingham and the University of London.

== Selected works ==
- The Romance of Amadís of Gaul (London: Blades, East and Blades, 1912; 2nd ed., 1916).
- The Palmerin Romances (London: Blades, East and Blades, 1916).
- Spanish and Portuguese Romances of Chivalry (Cambridge: Cambridge University Press, 1920).
- Short-Title Catalogue of Books Printed in Spain and of Spanish Books Printed elsewhere in Europe before 1601 Now in the British Museum (London: British Museum, 1921).
- Shakespeare and Spain (Oxford: Clarendon Press, 1922).
- Short-Title Catalogue of Books Printed in France and of French Books Printed in Other Countries from 1470 to 1600 Now in the British Museum (London: British Museum, 1924).
- Spanish Sixteenth-Century Printing (London: Ernest Benn, 1926).
- The Beginnings of Printing in London (London: Lanston Monotype Corporation, 1928).
- Monster and Miracle (Sonning-on-Thames: Manor House Press, 1935).
- The Star of Seville (Newton: Gregynog Press, 1935).
- The Discovery of Abyssinia by the Portuguese in 1520 (London: British Museum, 1938).
- The Crafty Farmer. A Spanish Folk-Tale. Illustrated by Gregorio Prieto (London: Dolphin Bookshop Editions, 1938).
- Early Spanish Bookbindings, XI–XV Centuries (London: Bibliographical Society, 1939).
- Short-Title Catalogue of Portuguese Books Printed before 1601 Now in the British Museum (London: British Museum, 1940).
- Short-Title Catalogue of Spanish-American Books Printed before 1601 Now in the British Museum (London: British Museum, 1944).
- Anti-English Propaganda in the Time of Queen Elizabeth (Oxford: Hispanic Society of America, 1946).
