= Thomas Henry =

Thomas, Tom, or Tommy Henry may refer to:

- Thomas Henry (apothecary) (1734–1816), surgeon and apothecary
- Thomas Henry (patron of the arts) (1766–1836), French painter and patron of the arts
- Thomas Henry (Pennsylvania politician) (1779–1849), Pennsylvania Congressman
- Thomas Henry (magistrate) (1807–1876), Anglo-Irish police magistrate
- Thomas Henry (illustrator) (1879–1962), English illustrator
- Thomas Charlton Henry (1887–1936), American philatelist
- Thomas Browne Henry (1907–1980), American character actor
- Thomas Henry (footballer) (born 1994), French footballer
- Thomas Monroe Henry (1857–1930), state auditor of Mississippi
- Tom Henry (1951–2024), mayor of Fort Wayne, Indiana, USA
- Tom Henry, back for the Rock Island Independents in 1920
- Tommy Henry (American football) (born 1969), American football player
- Tommy Henry (baseball) (born 1997), American baseball pitcher

== See also ==
- Thomas-Henry (disambiguation)
- Henry Thomas (disambiguation)
