= Théodore Hannon =

Belgian painter, watercolorist, engraver, and man of letters (1851–1916)

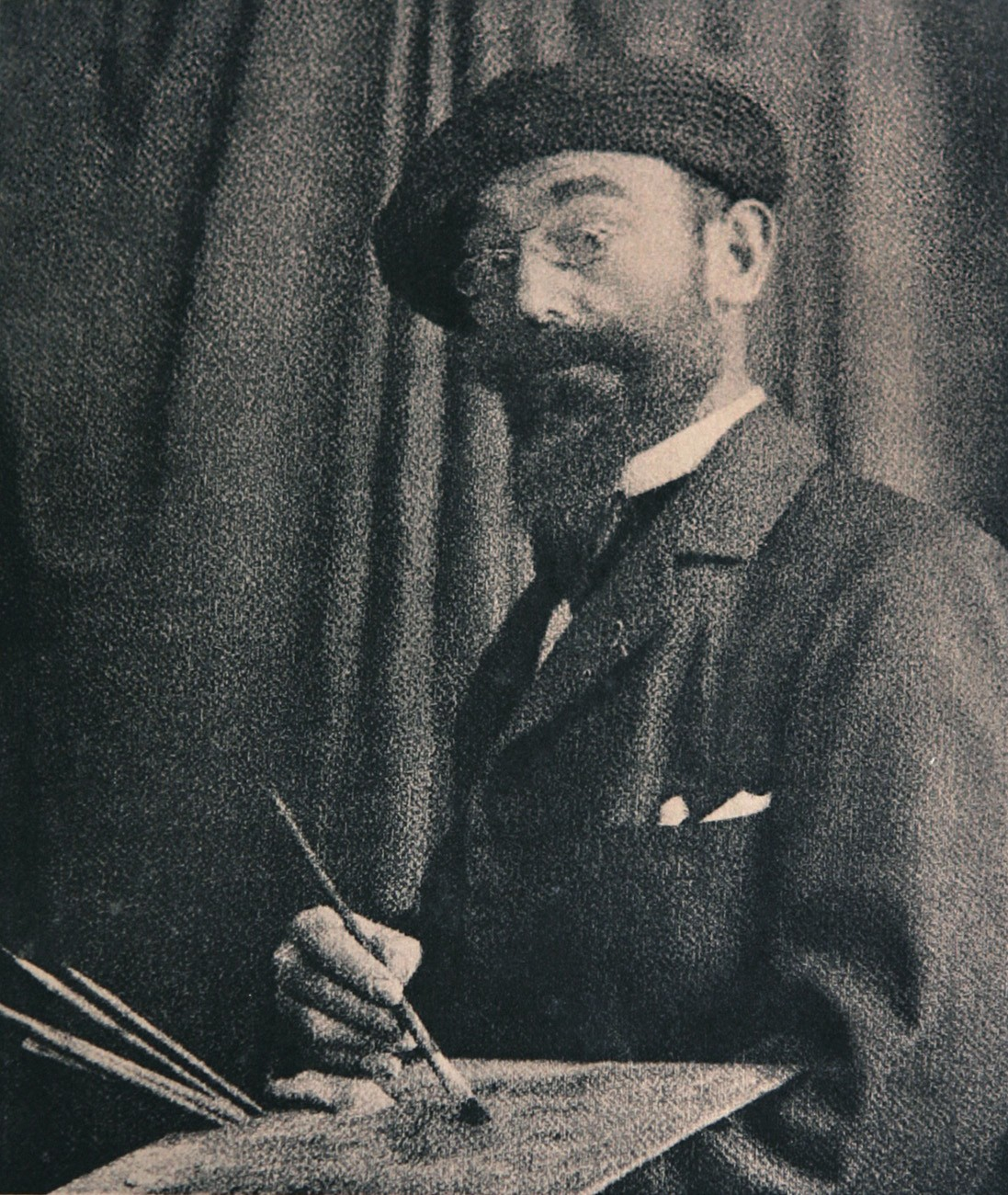
- Théodore Hannon
- Born: 1 October 1851 Ixelles, Belgium
- Died: 7 April 1916 (aged 64) Etterbeek, Belgium
- Occupation: artist; writer; poet

Théodore (Théo) Hannon (1851-1916) was a Belgian painter, watercolorist, engraver, and man of letters. As a man of letters, he was a scenarist, theatrical-parodist, and poet.

As a poet he enjoyed the rare honor of being mentioned in glowing terms—along with French contemporaries Charles Baudelaire, Gustave Flaubert, Stéphane Mallarmé, Tristan Corbière, and Paul Verlaine—by Des Esseintes in Joris-Karl Huysmans' famous decadent novel, À rebours

== Family ==
Born October 1, 1851, at Ixelles, Belgium, and died April 7, 1916, at Etterbeek, Belgium, Théodore was the second of three siblings. His father, Joseph-Désiré Hannon (1822-1870), was a doctor of medicine and a professor of natural sciences (botany, zoology) at the Free University of Brussels. His brother, Édouard Hannon (1853-1931), was an engineer by profession and a pioneer of Belgian artistic photography. His sister, Mariette Rousseau (1850-1926), née Marie-Sophie Hannon, was a respected mycologist.

== Biography ==
Hammond first followed in the footsteps of his deceased father, by enrolling in a study of the sciences (1870-1871) and then medicine (1871-1873) at the Free University of Brussels. But before he graduated, he pivoted away from medicine toward the fine arts. He re-enrolled at the Académie royale des Beaux-Arts de Bruxelles (Royal Academy of Fine Arts in Brussels), and took Camille van Camp as his master. He became a member of the Société Libre des Beaux-Arts and then in 1875, together with several other artists including Alfred Verhaeren, Louis Artan, Félicien Rops and Périclès Pantazis, became a founding member of a new, anti-conformist group: La Chrysalide. At this same time, he rejoined the International Society of Watercolorists, founded by Rops in 1869. Rops and Hannon exchanged a lot of letters from 1875 until the death of Rops in 1898. Their letters shows that the two artists were great friends, and talked about their work as well as their private life. Rops also conceived and realized illustrations and etchings for several of Théodore Hannon's works.

At the Royal Academy of Fine Arts, he became friends with the young James Ensor and, around 1880, introduced him to his sister and her husband, Ernest Rousseau, who went on to introduce Ensor into the artistic and intellectual circles of the capital at that time. Théodore Hannon had a large network with artistic and literary personalities, both in Brussels and Paris, including Joris-Karl Husymans and Henry Céard.

== Literary career ==
While he was working in the fine arts, Hannon also devoted himself to poetry. Writing under the pseudonym of "Red, Yellow, Black", he submitted some verse to the Students Journal (Journal des Etudiants), launched October 22 1874, which was "totally impregnated with ideas from the Free University of Brussels. Approached by Victor Reding, the spokesman for a modernist group that had manifested itself at the center of a literary circle on rue de Namur, he became associated with the launch of a weekly literary magazine, The Artist (1875-1878), that had "youthful tendencies" and whose first number appeared November 28 1875. In 1877, he became editor-in-chief of this magazine.

In August 1876, he published his first book, Les vingt-quatre coups de sonnet, a collection of poetry published by Félix Callewaert, who also printed The Artist. The book of poetry was embellished by an amusing frontispiece (mistakenly attributed to Rops). It was the work of a debutant, but worthy of notice because of its curious amalgam of realistic audacities and Parnassian exigencies. He fluctuated between being a painter and a poet, without concealing which of the two he preferred.

Despite his greater interest in the fine arts, literature would take a more important role in his activities and preoccupations. His relationship (mostly if not exclusively epistolary) with the French author Joris-Karl Huysmans seems to have contributed to this. In August, 1876 Huysmans, whose only known work at the time, Le Drageoir à épices (later changed to "aux épices"), had passed practically unnoticed, arrived in Brussels to supervise the publication of Martha, his second novel, which he didn't dare publish in his own country for fear of legal proceedings. He addressed himself to, and confided his manuscript into the hands of, Félix Callewaert. Martha was published by the Brussels publisher (under the name of Jean Gay) in Belgium on September 12, 1876, not too long after Hannon's first book of poetry, Les vingt-quatre coups de sonnet had appeared.

In the November 26, 1876, issue of The Artist, Hannon dedicated an article of high praise to Martha, which Huysmans thanked him for in a long letter dated December 16, 1876. It was the beginning of an exchange of letters that continued for several years, the tone of which was often marked by a similarity of taste. Huysmans later repaid the favor (of Hannon's positive review) publicly by writing the preface to a subsequent book of Hannon's poetry, Rhymes of Joy (Rimes de joie), published in 1881 at Gay and Doucé, but also—much more importantly—by including praise for the Belgian poet in the mouth of his character Des Esseintes, in Huysmans' seminal decadent novel À Rebours:

"[speaking of Tristan Corbière's] decadence... des Esseintes discovered it again in another poet, Théodore Hannon, a disciple of Baudelaire and Gautier, ripe in the special sense of studied elegances and factitious joys...."

In 1883, Hannon published Au pays de Manneken-Pis with Henry Kistemaekers. The next year, he published a second edition of Rhymes of Joy, this time with Kistemaekers and without Huysmans' preface. This edition also caused a feud between Hannon and Rops, because Hannon used an etching from Rops without asking for his permission. Théodore Hannon will publish four others books of traditional poetry, as well as, erotic poetry, and boulevard plays.

A major part of T. Hannon's letters and archives are located at KBR, including letters from Théodore Hannon to Félicien Rops from 1875 to 1893 (Ms. II 7733), as well as several illustrations by Hannon. The letters from Rops to Hannon are located at the Archives et Musée de la Littérature and available online.

== Literary works (in French) ==
- Les vingt-quatre coups de sonnet, avec frontispice à l'eau-forte, Bruxelles, Imprimerie Félix Callewaert, 1876 - Lire en ligne
- Rimes de joie, Bruxelles, Gay et Doucé, 1881 - Lire en ligne
- Au pays du Manneken-Pis, Bruxelles, éditions Henry Kistemaeckers, 1883 - Disponible à KBR
- Le Candélabre, Bruxelles, L. Hochsteyn, 1883 (opérinette, music by Jules Klein) - Disponible à KBR
- Rimes de joie, Edition définitive (augmentée de douze pièces originales), Bruxelles, éditions Henry Kistemaeckers, 1884 - Disponible à KBR
- Pierrot macabre : ballet pantomime, chez Pierrot aîné ("Bergame"), Bruxelles, 1886 - Lire en ligne
- Spa !!! Tout le monde descend ! : revue-opérette en trois actes et quatre tableaux, Bruxelles, Lefèvre, 1887 - Lire en ligne
- Une messe de minuit, Bruxelles, Charles Vos, 1888 (illustrated by d'Amadée Lynen) - Lire en ligne
- Smylis, ballet en un acte, Bruxelles, A. Lefèvre, 1892 (music by Léon Dubois) - Disponible à KBR
- Noëls fin-de-siècle, Bruxelles, Paul Lacomblez, 1892 (illustrated by Amadée Lynen) - Disponible à KBR
- La Marche aux étoiles. Ombres de MM. Duyck et Crespin, Bruxelles, Ed. Monner, 1896 (with Luc Malpertuis) - Disponible à KBR
- Bruxelles en chair et en noces !!! Revue-opérette en 3 actes et 10 tableaux, représentée au théâtre de la Scala. Couplets, Bruxelles, imprimerie du Messager de Bruxelles, 1898 - Disponible à KBR
- Au clair de la dune : poèmes, éditions Dorbon Ainé, Paris (1909) - Lire en ligne* Couplets de Olymp... y a du monde! : revue de printemps en 2 actes et un prologue, Bruxelles, imprimerie Veuve G. Masure, 1901 (music by M. Belery) - Disponible à KBR
- Au clair de la dune : poèmes, éditions Dorbon Ainé, Paris (1909) - Lire en ligne* Au clair de la dune : poèmes, éditions Dorbon Ainé, Paris (1909) - Lire en ligne
- La Toison de Phryné, Paris, Dorbon Ainé ; Bruxelles, livre en souscription à l'agence Dechenne, 1913 (illustrated by Henri Thomas) - Disponible à KBR

== Literary works (translated into English) ==
- Rhymes of Joy (originally Rimes de joie), Sunny Lou Publishing, 2023.
- Drinkers of Phosphorous and Other Songs of Joy (originally Rimes de joie), Richard Robinson (Translator), J.-K. Huysmans (Preface), Snuggly Books, 2020.

== Bibliography ==
  - Berg C. (1884), "Le suffète. Note sur Théodore Hannon et les Rimes de Joie”, in Delsemme P. and Trousson R. (éds), Le naturalisme et les lettres françaises de Belgique, Bruxelles, éditions de l’Université de Bruxelles.
  - Burns C. (1994), “Céard Épistolier: Lettres Inédites à Camille Lemonnier, à Théodore Hannon et à J.-K. Huysmans.”, in Les Cahiers Naturalistes, n°68, p.147–196.
  - De la Torre Giménez E. (2008), “L’odor di femina ou le jeu des réminiscences parfumées chez Théodore Hannon”, in Estudios de lengua y literatura francesas, n°18, p. 73-88. Lire en ligne
  - De la Torre Giménez E. (2013), "La Mer, lieu de représentation de la femme chez Georges Rodenbach et Théodore Hannon", in Thélème: Revista Complutense de Estudios Franceses, n°28, p. 277–291.
  - De Montpellier M. (2018), « Au pays de Manneken-Pis de Théodore Hannon », in Textyles, n°53. Lire en ligne
  - Delsemme P. (1999), « Théo Hannon », in Nouvelle biographie nationale, t.V, Bruxelles, Académie royale des sciences, des lettres et des beaux-arts de Belgique, p. 189-194. lire en ligne
  - Delsemme P. (2008), Théodore Hannon, poète moderniste, Bruxelles, Académie royale de langue et de littérature françaises de Belgique - Lire en ligne
  - Fayt R. (1998), “À propos des éditions de ‘Rimes de joie” de Théodore Hannon”, in Le livre et l’estampe, n°149, p. 7-28.
  - Gorceix P. (1998), Fin de siècle et symbolisme en Belgique : oeuvres poétiques : Théodore Hannon, Iwan Gilkin, Emile Verhaeren, Maurice Maeterlinck, Georges Rodenbach, Charles Van Lerberghe, Max Elskamp, Albert Mockel, Bruxelles, Complexe.
  - Huysmans J.-K., Lettres à Théodore Hannon (1876-1886), édition présentée et annotée par P. Cogny et Ch. Berg, Saint-Cyr-sur-Loire, Editions Christian Pirot, 1985.
  - Leblanc V. (1996); D'art, de rimes et de joie. Lettres à un ami éclectique : correspondance de Félicien Rops à Théodore Hannon, 1875-1887 : exposition, Namur, Musée Félicien Rops, 6 septembre-24 novembre 1996, Namur, Province de Namur : Service de la culture.
  - Mayeur I., (2009) “Un apport belge à la pantomime fin-de-siècle : Pierrot Macambre de Théodore Hannon (1886)”, in Rykner A. (éd.), Pantomime et théâtre du corps, Rennes, Presses universitaires de Rennes, p. 119-128. lire en ligne
  - Solvay L. (1956), « Hannon (Théodore) », in Biographie nationale de Belgique, t. 29, Bruxelles, Académie royale des sciences, des lettres et des beaux-arts de Belgique, col. 664-647. Lire en ligne
  - Symoens J.-J. et Dumont H. J. (2012), "Une famille belge de la Belle Epoque : les Hannon et les Rousseau, leur activité et leur héritage scientifique...", in Les Naturalistes belges, n°93, p. 1-28 - Lire en ligne
  - Vanwelkenhuyzen G. (1934), « J.-K. Huysmans et Théodore Hannon », in Revue franco-belge, décembre 1934, p. 565-584.
  - Vauthier B., “Les Rimes de joie de Théodore Hannon dans Los Raros de Rubén Dario”, in Textyles, n°23 (2003), p. 84-94. lire en ligne
